= 2020 Israeli Basketball League Cup =

Israeli basketball pre-season tournament

Tournament details
- Dates: 22 Sept - 26 Dec, 2020

Final positions
- Champions: Maccabi Tel Aviv
- Runners-up: Hapoel Holon

Awards and statistics
- MVP: (United States) Scottie Wilbekin

The 2020 Israeli Basketball League Cup, for sponsorships reasons the Winner League Cup, is the 15th edition of the pre-season tournament of the Israeli Basketball Premier League. All twelve Israeli Premier League team's was participate except from Hapoel Tel Aviv because the participation at the Champions League

== Bracket ==
First Round; 22-23 September
22 September, 19:30
Maccabi Haifa	91
Ironi Nahariya	81
23 September, 19:30
Hapoel Be'er Sheva	76
Hapoel Haifa	78
22 September, 19:30
Ironi Nes Ziona	90
Hapoel Eilat	94
23 September, 19:30
Hapoel Gilboa Galil	78
Bnei Herzliya	72

Quarterfinals; 24 September – 26 October
24 September, 19:00
Maccabi Rishon LeZion	91
Maccabi Haifa	73
26 October, 21:15
Maccabi Tel Aviv	83
Hapoel Haifa	74
24 September, 21:15
Hapoel Jerusalem	93
Hapoel Eilat	80
26 October, 18:50
Hapoel Holon	88
Hapoel Gilboa Galil	87

Semifinals; 31 October – 1 November
1 November, 21:00
Maccabi Rishon LeZion	72
Maccabi Tel Aviv	92
31 October, 20:00
Hapoel Jerusalem	85
Hapoel Holon	89

Final; 26 December
26 December, 20:00
Maccabi Tel Aviv	86
Hapoel Holon	84

== First round ==
=== Maccabi Haifa vs. Ironi Nahariya ===
22 September	Maccabi Haifa	91–81	Ironi Nahariya	Haifa
19:30	Scoring by quarter: 24–22, 23–13, 17–28, 27–18
Sport 5+	Pts: Dowe, Smith 19; Rebs: Nash 11; Asts: Dowe, Smith 5 PIR: Smith 30	Boxscore	Pts: Lucas, Blossomgame 23; Rebs: Alexander 13; Asts: Lucas, Alexander 3 PIR: Blossomgame 28	Arena: Romema Arena; Attendance: 0 Referees: Ofer Manheim, Elad Leibovich, Alex Naftali

=== Ironi Nes Ziona vs. Hapoel Eilat ===
22 September	Ironi Nes Ziona	90–94	Hapoel Eilat	Nes Ziona
19:30	Scoring by quarter: 25–20, 18–25, 28–20, 19–29
Sport 5+	Pts: Kwan Cheatham 20; Rebs: Kwan Cheatham 10; Asts: Miller, Berry 4 PIR: Kwan Cheatham 22	Boxscore	Pts: Skjöldebrand 23; Rebs: Nebo 12; Asts: Ragland 10; PIR: Prather 27	Arena: Lev Hamoshava; Attendance: 0 Referees: Omer Esteron, Dan Yalon, Noam Gordon

=== Hapoel Haifa vs. Hapoel Be'er Sheva ===
23 September	Hapoel Be'er Sheva	76–78	Hapoel Haifa	Be'er Sheva
19:35	Scoring by quarter: 23-20, 14-17, 20-17, 19-24
Sport 5	Pts: Weisz 20; Rebs: James Banks III 7 Asts: Weisz, Agada 4 PIR: Weisz 22	Boxscore	Pts: Rakeem Buckles 18; Rebs: Lennard Freeman 15; Asts: Ziv Ben Zvi 5 PIR: Lennard Freeman 23	Arena: Conch Arena; Attendance: 0 Referees: Erez Gurion, David Izmirli, Rotem Koza

=== Hapoel Gilboa Galil vs. Bnei Herzliya ===
23 September	Hapoel Gilboa Galil	78–72	Bnei Herzliya	Gan Ner
19:40	Scoring by quarter: 26-15, 17-22, 18-22, 17-13
Sport 5	Pts: Ziv 17; Rebs: Yotam Hanochi 8 Asts: Joe Thomasson 7 PIR: Ziv 24	Boxscore	Pts: Anthony 21; Rebs: Clarke 10; Asts: Clarke 4 PIR: Anthony 19	Arena: Gan Ner Sports Hall; Attendance: 0 Referees: Amit Balak, Pini Rimon, Adar Pe'er

== Quarterfinals ==
=== Maccabi Rishon LeZion vs. Maccabi Haifa ===
24 September	Maccabi Rishon LeZion	91–73	Maccabi Haifa	Tel Aviv
19:00	Scoring by quarter: 19–19, 26–21, 20–21, 26–12
Sport 5 Plus	Pts: Dovrat 18; Rebs: Monroe 12; Asts: Monroe 17; PIR: Monroe 19	Boxscore	Pts: Nash 16; Rebs: Nash 11; Asts: Dowe 6 PIR: Nash 22	Arena: Drive in Arena; Attendance: 0 Referees: Sefi Shemesh, Zahi Habdali, David Kolongi

=== Hapoel Jerusalem vs. Hapoel Eilat ===
24 September	Hapoel Jerusalem	93–80	Hapoel Eilat	Tel Aviv
21:15	Scoring by quarter: 19–22, 25–14, 28–16, 21–28
Sport 5 Plus	Pts: Sirvydis, Blatt, Hill 15; Rebs: Hill 8 Asts: Blatt 11; PIR: Blatt 27	Boxscore	Pts: Skjöldebrand 16; Rebs: Josh Nebo 10; Asts: Ragland 6 PIR: Ragland, Josh Nebo 17	Arena: Drive in Arena; Attendance: 0 Referees: Nir Meirson, Zahi Habdali, Yoav Leibovich

=== Hapoel Holon vs. Hapoel Gilboa Galil ===
26 October	Hapoel Holon	88–87	Hapoel Gilboa Galil	Tel Aviv
18:50	Scoring by quarter: 18–30, 29–23, 23–21, 18–13
Sport 5 Plus	Pts: Harris 21; Rebs: Johnson 8 Asts: Tyrus Mcgee 5 PIR: Harris 23	Boxscore	Pts: Ziv 23; Rebs: Ziv 8 Asts: Joe Thomasson 5 PIR: Ziv 25	Arena: Drive in Arena; Attendance: 0 Referees: Zahi Habdali, David Romano, Gil Gordon

=== Maccabi Tel Aviv vs. Hapoel Haifa ===
26 October	Maccabi Tel Aviv	83–74	Hapoel Haifa	Tel Aviv
21:15	Scoring by quarter: 23–17, 24–22, 21–16, 15–19
Sport 5	Pts: Blayzer 19; Rebs: Blayzer, Žižić 8 Asts: Chris Jones 5 PIR: Hunter 18	Boxscore	Pts: Siggers 19; Rebs: Lennard Freeman 13; Asts: Evans 4 PIR: Lennard Freeman 12	Arena: Drive in Arena; Attendance: 0 Referees: Sefi Shemesh, Nir Meirson, David Izmirli

== Semifinals ==
=== Maccabi Rishon LeZion vs. Maccabi Tel Aviv ===
1 November	Maccabi Tel Aviv	92–72	Maccabi Rishon LeZion	Tel Aviv
21:00	Scoring by quarter: 32-18, 26-15, 15-26, 19-13
Sport 5	Pts: Wilbekin 22; Rebs: Žižić 10; Asts: Wilbekin 27; PIR: Žižić 18	Boxscore	Pts: Taylor 17; Rebs: Mitchell 5 Asts: Gutt 5 PIR: Noam Avivi 18	Arena: Drive in Arena; Attendance: 0 Referees: Omer Esteron, Dan Yalon, Noam Gordon

=== Hapoel Jerusalem vs. Hapoel Holon ===
31 October	Hapoel Jerusalem	85–89	Hapoel Holon	Tel Aviv
20:00	Scoring by quarter: 12–20, 25–24, 26–14, 22–31
Sport 5	Pts: McGee 27; Rebs: McGee 6 Asts: Johnson, Pnini, Harris 3 PIR: McGee 29	Boxscore	Pts: Braimoh 21; Rebs: Thomas 8 Asts: Blatt 7 PIR: Braimoh 22	Arena: Drive in Arena; Attendance: 0 Referees: Sefi Shemesh, Zahi Habdali, Rotem Koza

== Final ==
=== Maccabi Tel Aviv vs. Hapoel Holon ===
26 December	Maccabi Tel Aviv	86–84	Hapoel Holon	Tel Aviv
20:00	Scoring by quarter: 18–26, 22–22, 27–15, 19–21
Sport 5	Pts: Caloiaro 15; Rebs: Caloiaro, Bender 6 Asts: Bryant, Wilbekin 4 PIR: Caloiaro 20	Boxscore	Pts: McGee 28; Rebs: Workman 8 Asts: Harris 6 PIR: McGee 33	Arena: Drive in Arena; Attendance: 0 Referees: Amit Balak, Dan Yalon, Adar Pe'er

Starters:			Pts	Reb	Ast
SG	0	(United States) Elijah Bryant	12	2	4
G	1	(United States) Scottie Wilbekin	14	3	4
F	4	(United States) Angelo Caloiaro	15	6	1
F	14	(Israel) Oz Blayzer	7	3	3
PF	32	(Croatia) Dragan Bender	12	6	1
Reserves:					
G/F	6	(Israel) Sandy Cohen	0	5	1
F	7	(Israel) Omri Casspi	14	3	3
PG	12	(United States) John DiBartolomeo	2	2	2
C	23	(Croatia) Ante Žižić	7	5	0
SF	50	(Israel) Yovel Zoosman	3	3	2
G/F	18	(Israel) Dori Sahar	DNP		
F/C	25	(Israel) Yonathan Atias	DNP		
Head coach:
(Greece) Ioannis Sfairopoulos

M. Tel Aviv	H. Holon

M. Tel Aviv	Statistics	H. Holon
23/36 (64%)	2 point field goals	17/32 (53%)
9/24 (37%)	3 point field goals	13/33 (39%)
13/18 (72%)	Free throws	11/13 (84%)
40	Rebounds	26
21	Assists	18
5	Steals	6
13	Turnovers	7
3	Blocks	3

Starters:			Pts	Reb	Ast
SF	2	(United States) Willy Workman	10	8	3
G	11	(United States) C. J. Harris	10	1	6
C	14	(Belgium) Maxime De Zeeuw	11	6	3
SG	25	(United States) Tyrus McGee	28	2	2
PF	32	(United States) Isaiah Miles	8	4	0
Reserves:					
SG	8	(France) Frédéric Bourdillon	11	1	2
F	10	(Israel) Guy Pnini	6	1	2
SF	4	(United States) Chris Johnson	DNP		
PF	7	(Israel) Tal Zach	DNP		
PG	9	(Israel) Oded Brandwein	DNP		
F/C	15	(Uruguay) Uriel Trocki	DNP		
G	21	(Israel) Ofek Fogelman	DNP		
Head coach:
(Greece) Stefanos Dedas

2020 League Cup Winners
Maccabi Tel Aviv
8th title
