= 2020–21 Israeli Basketball Premier League =

67th season of the Israeli Basketball Premier League

Israeli Basketball Premier League
- Season: 2020–21
- Dates: 1 November 2020 – 17 June 2021
- Games played: 208
- Teams: 13
- TV partner(s): Sports Channel

Regular season
- Season MVP: (United States) Casey Prather
- Relegated: Ironi Nahariya; Maccabi Haifa

Finals
- Champions: Maccabi Tel Aviv (55th title)
- Runners-up: Hapoel Gilboa Galil
- Semifinalists: Hapoel Holon; Hapoel Eilat
- Finals MVP: (United States) Scottie Wilbekin

Awards
- Israeli MVP: (Israel) Yiftach Ziv
- Rising Star: (Israel) Yair Kravitz
- Best Defender: (United States) Chris Johnson
- Most Improved: (Israel) Noam Dovrat
- Sixth Man: (Israel) Guy Pnini
- Coach of the Year: (Greece) Stefanos Dedas

Statistical leaders
Points	(Nigeria) Caleb Agada	22.9
Rebounds	(United States) Josh Nebo	10.0
Assists	(Israel) Tamir Blatt	7.9
Index Rating	(United States) Keenan Evans	25.8
- All statistics correct as of 17 June 2021.

The 2020–21 Israeli Basketball Premier League, for sponsorship reasons Ligat Winner, was the 67th season of the Israeli Basketball Premier League.

== Format ==
The regular season will be played in a 26-round Round-Robin format.
The top 6 finishers will play the 5 round "upper house", with the other 7 teams playing the 7 round "bottom group".
The 6 upper group teams, joined by the top 2 teams from the bottom group, will play the originally planned to be Best-of-5 Quarter finals as Best-of-3 series.
The Semi finals and Finals will also be played as Best-of-3 series.

== Teams ==
Teams of the 2020–21 Israeli Basketball Premier League

Hapoel Haifa and Bnei Herzliya have been promoted to the league after placing the top two places of the 2019–20 Liga Leumit.

=== Stadia and locations ===
Team	Home city	Stadium	Capacity
Hapoel Be'er Sheva	Be'er Sheva	Conch Arena	3,000
Hapoel Eilat	Eilat	Begin Arena	1,490
Hapoel Gilboa Galil	Gilboa Regional Council	Gan Ner Sports Hall	2,100
Hapoel Haifa	Haifa	Romema Arena	5,000
Hapoel Holon	Holon	Holon Toto Hall	5,500
Hapoel Jerusalem	Jerusalem	Pais Arena	11,000
Hapoel Tel Aviv	Tel Aviv	Drive in Arena	3,504
Ironi Nahariya	Nahariya	Ein Sarah	2,500
Ironi Nes Ziona	Ness Ziona	Lev Hamoshava	1,200
Bnei Herzliya	Herzliya	HaYovel Herzliya	1,500
Maccabi Haifa	Haifa	Romema Arena	5,000
Maccabi Rishon LeZion	Rishon LeZion	Beit Maccabi Rishon	2,500
Maccabi Tel Aviv	Tel Aviv	Menora Mivtachim Arena	10,383

=== Personnel and sponsorship ===
Team	Chairman	Head coach	Team captain	Kit manufacturer	Main sponsor
Bnei Herzliya	(Israel) Eldad Akunis	(Israel) Sharon Drucker	(Israel) Nitzan Hanochi	Peak	
Hapoel Be'er Sheva	(Israel) Kfir Arazi	(Israel) Rami Hadar	(United States) (Israel) Spencer Weisz	Spalding	Altshuler Shaham
Hapoel Eilat	(Israel) Tal Pinhas	(Israel) Ariel Beit-Halahmy	(Israel) (Sweden) Jonathan Skjöldebrand	Peak	Yossi Avrahami
Hapoel Gilboa Galil	(Israel) Haim Ohayon	(Israel) Avishai Gordon	(Israel) Yotam Hanochi	Peak	Gilboa Regional Council
Hapoel Haifa	(Israel) Yuval Rosman	(Israel) Elad Hasin	(Israel) Ofek Avital	Peak	B-CURE LASER
Hapoel Holon	(Israel) Eitan Lanciano	(Greece) Stefanos Dedas	(Israel) Guy Pnini	Kelme	Unet credit
Hapoel Jerusalem	(Israel) Eyal Chomski	(Israel) Yonathan Alon	(United States) J'Covan Brown	Peak	Bank Yahav
Hapoel Tel Aviv	(Israel) Rami Cohen	(Israel) Danny Franco	(Israel) Yam Madar	Peak	SP Metzer
Ironi Nahariya	(Israel) Zviel Rubin	(Israel) Shai Segalovich	(Israel) Orr Leumi	Peak	Geshem Holdings
Ironi Nes Ziona	(Israel) Yaniv Mizrahi	(United States) Brad Greenberg	(Israel) Tal Dunne	Kappa	Chai Motors
Maccabi Haifa	(United States) Jeff Rosen	(Israel) Amit Ben David	(Israel) Alex Chubrevich	Joma	
Maccabi Rishon LeZion	(Israel) Itzhak Peri	(Israel) Guy Goodes	(United States) Darryl Monroe	Under Armour	Zarfati Zvi and his sons
Maccabi Tel Aviv	(Israel) Shimon Mizrahi	(Greece) Ioannis Sfairopoulos	(United States) (Israel) John DiBartolomeo	Nike	Playtika

=== Managerial changes ===
Team	Outgoing manager	Manner of departure	Date of vacancy	Position in table	Replaced with	Date of appointment
Ironi Nahariya	(Israel) Danny Franco	Resigned	22 December 2020	11th (1–5)	(Israel) Shai Segalovich	24 December 2020
Hapoel Jerusalem	(Israel) Oded Kattash	Mutual consent	14 January 2021	3rd (7–2)	(Lithuania) Dainius Adomaitis	14 January 2021
Hapoel Gilboa Galil	(Israel) Lior Lubin	Mutual consent	14 January 2021	4th (7–2)	(Israel) Avishai Gordon	14 January 2021
Hapeol Tel Aviv	(Greece) Ioannis Kastritis	Fired	5 February 2021	11th (3–8)	(Israel) Danny Franco	5 February 2021
Maccabi Haifa	(Venezuela) Daniel Seoane	Fired	6 March 2021	13th (2–12)	(Israel) Amit Ben David	6 March 2021
Hapoel Jerusalem	(Lithuania) Dainius Adomaitis	Fired	9 April 2021	5rd (13–8)	(Israel) Yonathan Alon	9 April 2021

== Regular season ==
Pos	Team	Pld	W	L	PF	PA	PD	PCT	Qualification or relegation
1	Maccabi Tel Aviv	24	19	5	2152	1824	+328	.792	Advance to the Top-teams League Group
2	Hapoel Eilat	24	17	7	2200	2032	+168	.708	Advance to the Top-teams League Group
3	Hapoel Gilboa Galil	24	17	7	2009	1915	+94	.708	Advance to the Top-teams League Group
4	Hapoel Holon	24	16	8	2086	1990	+96	.667	Advance to the Top-teams League Group
5	Hapoel Haifa	24	14	10	2087	2130	−43	.583	Advance to the Top-teams League Group
6	Hapoel Jerusalem	24	13	11	2123	2100	+23	.542	Advance to the Top-teams League Group
7	Hapoel Be'er Sheva	24	13	11	2054	1999	+55	.542	Advance to the Bottom-Teams League Group
8	Ironi Nes Ziona	24	12	12	2022	1997	+25	.500	Advance to the Bottom-Teams League Group
9	Maccabi Rishon LeZion	24	11	13	2098	2090	+8	.458	Advance to the Bottom-Teams League Group
10	Hapoel Tel Aviv	24	8	16	2010	2087	−77	.333	Advance to the Bottom-Teams League Group
11	Bnei Herzliya	24	7	17	2060	2111	−51	.292	Advance to the Bottom-Teams League Group
12	Maccabi Haifa	24	6	18	1959	2200	−241	.250	Advance to the Bottom-Teams League Group
13	Ironi Nahariya	24	3	21	1937	2322	−385	.125	Advance to the Bottom-Teams League Group

=== Rounds 1 to 26 ===
Home \ Away	MTA	HEI	HGG	HHO	HHA	HJE	HBS	INZ	MRL	HTA	BNH	MHA	INA
Maccabi Tel Aviv		86–74	70–79	100–81	81–75	101–80	100–74	96–74	105–77	80–77	98–75	95–60	107–63
Hapoel Eilat	91–85		89–75	77–83	89–80	79–100	85–72	95–85	86–84	108–93	84–98	98–88	123–60
Hapoel Gilboa Galil	85–78	77–100		80–82	96–79	81–75	86–73	92–89	75–85	88–68	92–78	77–78	92–72
Hapoel Holon	79–76	80–73	81–88		96–88	103–94	82–75	90–92	99–94	77–63	90–85	105–69	98–76
Hapoel Haifa	67–104	84–97	68–83	96–85		101–99	101–91	106–91	85–84	92–78	80–79	87–84	97–87
Hapoel Jerusalem	76–100	95–104	83–101	82–73	87–100		94–66	83–99	97–84	89–95	96–86	111–77	91–82
Hapoel Be'er Sheva	93–79	93–88	83–60	86–89	78–82	81–83		93–89	98–84	88–75	94–86	94–86	104–80
Ironi Nes Ziona	58–65	84–89	88–74	84–76	100–70	78–84	85–78		93–73	76–66	80–74	80–76	76–71
Maccabi Rishon LeZion	72–89	90–95	69–71	100–91	104–98	98–67	62–70	79–74		86–84	93–85	102–72	91–93
Hapoel Tel Aviv	69–85	91–81	91–107	104–98	71–80	76–88	95–86	82–80	85–91		86–98	83–92	112–77
Bnei Herzliya	86–92	78–103	89–95	71–85	91–79	80–88	75–77	82–79	84–87	89–99		104–77	104–88
Maccabi Haifa	78–82	81–85	77–82	70–79	91–100	75–94	61–102	113–94	106–99	80–73	89–79		77–85
Ironi Nahariya	81–98	90–107	63–73	67–84	84–92	80–87	92–105	90–94	88–110	71–94	80–104	110–102	

Legend: Blue = home team win; Red = away team win.
Matches with lighter background shading were decided after overtime.

== Top-teams League Group ==
Pos	Team	Pld	W	L	PF	PA	PD	PCT	Qualification or relegation	MTA	HHO	HGG	HEI	HHA	HJE
1	Maccabi Tel Aviv	29	23	6	2567	2185	+382	.793	Advance to the playoffs		86–65		95–72	85–76	
2	Hapoel Holon	29	19	10	2515	2419	+96	.655	Advance to the playoffs				104–93		103–81
3	Hapoel Gilboa Galil	29	19	10	2432	2327	+105	.655	Advance to the playoffs	65–67	83–88			77–63	
4	Hapoel Eilat	29	18	11	2662	2528	+134	.621	Advance to the playoffs			95–104		123–97	79–96
5	Hapoel Haifa	29	16	13	2506	2569	−63	.552	Advance to the playoffs		86–69				97–85
6	Hapoel Jerusalem	29	16	13	2567	2555	+12	.552	Advance to the playoffs	83–82		99–94			

=== Positions by games played ===
Team ╲ Games played	24	25	26	27	28	29
Maccabi Tel Aviv	1	1	1	1	1	1
Hapoel Holon	4	2	2	3	2	2
Hapoel Gilboa Galil	3	4	4	2	3	3
Hapoel Eilat	2	3	3	4	4	4
Hapoel Haifa	5	5	5	5	5	5
Hapoel Jerusalem	6	6	6	6	6	6

= Leader and advance to playoffs; = Advance to the playoffs

== Bottom-Teams League Group ==
Pos	Team	Pld	W	L	PF	PA	PD	PCT	Qualification or relegation	INZ	HBS	MRL	HTA	BNH	MHA	INA
7	Ironi Nes Ziona	30	17	13	2627	2522	+105	.567	Advance to the playoffs			87–86		87–98		105–91
8	Hapoel Be'er Sheva	30	17	13	2589	2521	+68	.567	Advance to the playoffs	82–107			99–100		85–76	
9	Maccabi Rishon LeZion	30	15	15	2673	2608	+65	.500			83–87		99–93		113–83	
10	Hapoel Tel Aviv	30	12	18	2562	2639	−77	.400		89–113				82–79		96–74
11	Bnei Herzliya	30	10	20	2611	2651	−40	.333			81–92	88–106			108–88	
12	Maccabi Haifa	30	7	23	2478	2788	−310	.233	Relegation to Liga Leumit	79–106			88–92			105–84
13	Ironi Nahariya	30	3	27	2426	2903	−477	.100	Relegation to Liga Leumit		75–90	80–88		85–97		

=== Positions by Round ===
Team ╲ Round (Note: This list takes the 1st round of the Bottom-Teams League Group to be Round 25 instead of 27, as all League Group Teams have played 24 games.)	24	25	26	27	28	29	30	31
Ironi Nes Ziona	8	8	7	7	7	8	7	7
Hapoel Be'er Sheva	7	7	8	8	8	7	8	8
Maccabi Rishon LeZion	9	9	9	9	9	9	9	9
Hapoel Tel Aviv	10	10	10	10	10	10	10	10
Bnei Herzliya	11	11	11	11	11	11	11	11
Maccabi Haifa	12	12	12	12	12	12	12	12
Ironi Nahariya	13	13	13	13	13	13	13	13

= Advance to the playoffs; = Relegation to Liga Leumit

== Playoffs ==
Quarterfinals; 31 May – 5 June 2021
1	Maccabi Tel Aviv	67	93	—	2
8	Hapoel Be'er Sheva	56	92	—	0
4	Hapoel Eilat	84	98	—	2
5	Hapoel Haifa	80	87	—	0
2	Hapoel Holon	92	75	85	2
7	Ironi Nes Ziona	90	86	76	1
3	Hapoel Gilboa Galil	85	91	—	2
6	Hapoel Jerusalem	58	89	—	0

Semifinals; 6 – 12 June 2021
1	Maccabi Tel Aviv	88	80	—	2
4	Hapoel Eilat	72	79	—	0
2	Hapoel Holon	72	63	—	0
3	Hapoel Gilboa Galil	74	78	—	2

Finals; 14 – 17 June 2021
1	Maccabi Tel Aviv	83	76	73	2
3	Hapoel Gilboa Galil	74	81	67	1

=== Quarterfinals ===
Team 1	Series	Team 2	Game 1	Game 2	Game 3
Maccabi Tel Aviv	2–0	Hapoel Be'er Sheva	67–56	93–92	—
Hapoel Eilat	2–0	Hapoel Haifa	84–80	98–87	—
Hapoel Holon	2–1	Ironi Nes Ziona	92–90	75–86	85–76
Hapoel Gilboa Galil	2–0	Hapoel Jerusalem	85–58	91–89	—

==== Game 1 ====
31 May 2021	Maccabi Tel Aviv	67–56 (Series: 1–0)	Hapoel Be'er Sheva	Tel Aviv
21:00	Scoring by quarter: 20–18, 13–13, 19–7, 15–18
5 Sport	Pts: Žižić 20; Rebs: Casspi 10; Asts: Wilbekin 6 PIR: Žižić 20	Boxscore	Pts: Bell & Suss 12; Rebs: Thompson 9 Asts: Zoosman 5 PIR: Thompson 15	Arena: Menora Mivtachim Arena; Attendance: 3,848; Referees: David Romano, Zahi Habdali, Lior Beynish

31 May 2021	Hapoel Eilat	84–80 (Series: 1–0)	Hapoel Haifa	Eilat
19:00	Scoring by quarter: 21–14, 26–27, 14–19, 23–20
5 Stars	Pts: Prather 21; Rebs: Carter & Skjöldebrand & Prather 6 Asts: Ragland 6 PIR: Carter 21	Boxscore	Pts: Evans 25; Rebs: Freeman 19; Asts: Siggers 4 PIR: Freeman 29	Arena: Begin Arena; Attendance: 750; Referees: Omer Esteron, Dan Yalon, Guy Shmueli

1 June 2021	Hpoel Holon	92–90 (Series: 1–0)	Ironi Nes Ziona	Holon
21:00	Scoring by quarter: 14–24, 33–13, 20–26, 25–27
5 Sport	Pts: Harris 22; Rebs: Pnini 7 Asts: Pnini 6 PIR: Harris 30	Boxscore	Pts: Miller 28; Rebs: Meyinsse 12; Asts: Miller 10; PIR: Miller 35	Arena: Holon Toto Hall; Attendance: 3,700; Referees: Amit Balak, Ofer Manheim, Elad Leibowitz

1 June 2021	Hapoel Gilboa Galil	85–58 (Series: 1–0)	Hapoel Jerusalem	Gan Ner
19:00	Scoring by quarter: 14–12, 23–18, 29–16, 19–12
5 Live	Pts: Blackshear 18; Rebs: Blackshear 9 Asts: Thomasson 6 PIR: Blackshear 26	Boxscore	Pts: Braimoh 18; Rebs: Zalmanson 7 Asts: Blatt 10; PIR: Braimoh 20	Arena: Gan Ner Sports Hall; Attendance: 1,150; Referees: Sefi Shemesh, Nir Meirson, Adar Pe'er

==== Game 2 ====
2 June 2021	Hapoel Be'er Sheva	92–93 (Series: Maccabi Tel Aviv wins 0–2)	Maccabi Tel Aviv	Be'er Sheva
17:30	Scoring by quarter: 14–21, 23–21, 25–29, 30–22
5 Sport	Pts: Bell & Weisz 21; Rebs: Suss 12; Asts: Weisz 6 PIR: Weisz 24	Boxscore	Pts: Caloiaro 18; Rebs: Blayzer 9 Asts: Wilbekin 6 PIR: Žižić 25	Arena: Conch Arena; Attendance: 2,100; Referees: Ofer Manheim, Kfir Mualem, Noam Gordon

2 June 2021	Hapoel Haifa	87–98 (Series: Hapoel Eilat wins 0–2)	Hapoel Eilat	Haifa
20:00	Scoring by quarter: 21–28, 30–22, 14–25, 22–23
5 Plus	Pts: Evans 19; Rebs: Freeman 9 Asts: Siggers & Evans 6 PIR: Freeman 24	Boxscore	Pts: Ragland 28; Rebs: Ogbeide 11; Asts: Ragland 9 PIR: Ragland 38	Arena: Romema Arena; Attendance: 710; Referees: Erez Gurion, David Romano, Rotem Kuza

3 June 2021	Ironi Nes Ziona	86–75 (Series: 1–1)	Hapoel Holon	Ness Ziona
19:00	Scoring by quarter: 26–15, 26–24, 17–20, 17–16
5 Live	Pts: Meyinsse 28; Rebs: Meyinsse `14; Asts: Miller 7 PIR: Meyinsse 48	Boxscore	Pts: Harris 20; Rebs: Sokołowski 9 Asts: Sokołowski & Guy Pnini 5 PIR: Sokołowski 23	Arena: Lev Hamoshava; Attendance: 1,300; Referees: Sefi Shemesh, Omer Esteron, Zahi Habdali

3 June 2021	Hapoel Jerusalem	89–91 (Series: Hapoel Gilboa Galil wins 0–2)	Hapoel Gilboa Galil	Jerusalem
21:00	Scoring by quarter: 28–18, 30–21, 21–25, 10–27
5 Sport	Pts: Braimoh 18; Rebs: Braimoh 8 Asts: Blatt 11; PIR: Blatt 26	Boxscore	Pts: Floyd 25; Rebs: Floyd 10; Asts: Thomasson 5 PIR: Floyd 42	Arena: Pais Arena; Attendance: 3,100; Referees: Amit Balak, Elad Leibowitz, Uri Shalhavi

==== Game 3 ====
5 June 2021	Hpoel Holon	85–76 (Series: Hpoel Holon wins 2–1)	Ironi Nes Ziona	Holon
20:40	Scoring by quarter: 15–14, 19–23, 26–20, 25–19
5 Sport	Pts: Harris 25; Rebs: Sokołowski 6 Asts: Harris 5 PIR: Harris 34	Boxscore	Pts: Selden 24; Rebs: Levi 9 Asts: Angola & Carreira 3 PIR: Angola 24	Arena: Holon Toto Hall; Attendance: 4,800; Referees: Sefi Shemesh, Omer Esteron, Amit Balak

=== Semifinals ===
Team 1	Series	Team 2	Game 1	Game 2	Game 3
Maccabi Tel Aviv	2–0	Hapoel Eilat	88–72	80–79	—
Hpoel Holon	0–2	Hapoel Gilboa Galil	72–74	63–78	—

==== Game 1 ====
6 June 2021	Maccabi Tel Aviv	88–72 (Series: 1–0)	Hapoel Eilat	Tel Aviv
21:00	Scoring by quarter: 22–21, 23–13, 21–18, 22–20
5 Sport	Pts: Casspi 17; Rebs: Hunter 9 Asts: Wilbekin 8 PIR: Casspi 19	Boxscore	Pts: Prather 24; Rebs: Ogbeide 5 Asts: Ragland 8 PIR: Prather 26	Arena: Menora Mivtachim Arena; Attendance: 5,554; Referees: Erez Gurion, David Romano, Dan Yalon

7 June 2021	Hpoel Holon	72–74 (Series: 0–1)	Hapoel Gilboa Galil	Holon
21:00	Scoring by quarter: 18–23, 21–18, 13–17, 20–16
5 Sport	Pts: Harris 19; Rebs: Sestina 6 Asts: Harris 5 PIR: Harris 21	Boxscore	Pts: Ziv 23; Rebs: Floyd 7 Asts: Ziv 6 PIR: Ziv 33	Arena: Holon Toto Hall; Attendance: 4,300; Referees: Amit Balak, Elad Leibowitz, Zahi Habdali

==== Game 2 ====
8 June 2021	Hapoel Eilat	79–80 (Series: Maccabi Tel Aviv wins 0–2)	Maccabi Tel Aviv	Eilat
21:00	Scoring by quarter: 20–20, 28–20, 10–14, 21–26
5 Sport	Pts: Prather 28; Rebs: Prather 8 Asts: Prather & Ragland 8 PIR: Prather 38	Boxscore	Pts: Jones 27; Rebs: Hunter 7 Asts: Jones 6 PIR: Jones 38	Arena: Begin Arena; Attendance: 1,250; Referees: Omer Esteron, Ofer Manheim, Nir Meirson

12 June 2021	Hapoel Gilboa Galil	78–63 (Series: Hapoel Gilboa Galil wins 2–0)	Hpoel Holon	Gan Ner
21:15	Scoring by quarter: 19–19, 13–16, 21–13, 25–15
5 Sport	Pts: Blackshear 24; Rebs: Blackshear 7 Asts: Ziv 5 PIR: Blackshear 35	Boxscore	Pts: Alexander 16; Rebs: Workman 7 Asts: Bourdillon & Harris 2 PIR: Alexander 14	Arena: Gan Ner Sports Hall; Attendance: 2,250; Referees: Sefi Shemesh, Amit Balak, Elad Leibowitz
Note: On the original date of the game (June 9), in the fourth quarter there was a regional power outage for almost an hour in Gan Ner Sports Hall. At the end of the power outage, it was decided to resume the game, but Hapoel Holon decided not to continue playing. Following the decision, the disciplinary committee of the basketball association ruled a technical loss to Hapoel Holon and imposed a fine of 10,000 NIS. On June 11, the association's Supreme Court decided to reverse the verdict and hold a rematch following an appeal by Hapoel Holon. The Court also increased the fine imposed to 50,000 NIS.

=== Finals ===
Team 1	Series	Team 2	Game 1	Game 2	Game 3
Maccabi Tel Aviv	2–1	Hapoel Gilboa Galil	83–74	76–81	73–67

14 June 2021	Maccabi Tel Aviv	83–74 (Series: 1–0)	Hapoel Gilboa Galil	Tel Aviv
21:00	Scoring by quarter: 21–15, 21–21, 15–14, 26–24
5 Sport	Pts: Wilbekin 24; Rebs: Žižić 9 Asts: Jones & Caloiaro 3 PIR: Žižić & Caloiaro 21	Boxscore	Pts: Floyd 17; Rebs: Floyd 7 Asts: Blackshear & Ziv 4 PIR: Ziv 22	Arena: Menora Mivtachim Arena; Attendance: 9,455; Referees: Omer Esteron, Erez Gurion, Ofer Manheim

16 June 2021	Hapoel Gilboa Galil	81–76 (Series: 1–1)	Maccabi Tel Aviv	Gan Ner
21:00	Scoring by quarter: 30–16, 21–24, 13–14, 17–22
5 Sport	Pts: Blackshear 20; Rebs: Blackshear 10; Asts: Thomasson 10; PIR: Thomasson 28	Boxscore	Pts: Wilbekin 34; Rebs: Žižić 13; Asts: Jones 5 PIR: Wilbekin 25	Arena: Gan Ner Sports Hall; Attendance: 2,250; Referees: Sefi Shemesh, Amit Balak, Nir Meirson

17 June 2021	Maccabi Tel Aviv	73–67 (Series: Maccabi Tel Aviv wins 2–1)	Hapoel Gilboa Galil	Tel Aviv
21:00	Scoring by quarter: 24–15, 18–14, 19–18, 12–20
5 Sport	Pts: Wilbekin 19; Rebs: Zoosman 6 Asts: Zoosman 5 PIR: Wilbekin 21	Boxscore	Pts: Gershon 14; Rebs: Blackshear 10; Asts: Thomasson 4 PIR: Floyd 13	Arena: Menora Mivtachim Arena; Attendance: 10,500; Referees: Sefi Shemesh, Omer Esteron, Amit Balak

2020–21 Israeli Premier League champions
Maccabi Tel Aviv
55th title

== Awards ==
=== MVP of the Round ===
Round	Player	Team	EFF	Ref.
November
4	(Nigeria) (Canada) Caleb Agada (1/4)	Hapoel Be'er Sheva	39	
5	(United States) Jason Siggers	Hapoel Haifa	28	
6	(United States) TaShawn Thomas	Hapoel Jerusalem	40	
December
7	(United States) Chris Kramer	Hapoel Jerusalem	35	
8	(United States) Reggie Upshaw	Hapoel Tel Aviv	30	
11	(United States) Scottie Wilbekin (1/2)	Maccabi Tel Aviv	31	
–
1	(Nigeria) (Canada) Caleb Agada (2/4)	Hapoel Be'er Sheva	34	
2	(United States) Chris Kramer	Hapoel Jerusalem	45	
3	(United States) C. J. Harris	Hapoel Holon	28	
9	(United States) Keenan Evans	Hapoel Haifa	30	
10	(Colombia) Braian Angola	Ironi Nes Ziona	27	
12	(United States) Coty Clarke (1/2)	Bnei Herzliya	31	
13	(United States) (Panama) Akil Mitchell (1/2)	Maccabi Rishon LeZion	45	
14	(United States) Michael Cobbins	Maccabi Haifa	36	
15	(United States) (Panama) Akil Mitchell (2/2)	Maccabi Rishon LeZion	42	
16	(United States) Casey Prather (1/2)	Hapoel Eilat	23	
17	(Israel) Yiftach Ziv	Hapoel Gilboa Galil	39	
18	(United States) Justin Tillman	Hapoel Tel Aviv	50	
19	(Nigeria) (Canada) Caleb Agada (3/4)	Hapoel Be'er Sheva	38	
20	(United States) Jeremy Pargo (1/2)	Maccabi Rishon LeZion	29	
21	(United States) Patrick Miller	Ironi Nes Ziona	29	
22	(United States) Kerry Blackshear Jr.	Hapoel Gilboa Galil	48	
23	(United States) Eric Thompson	Hapoel Be'er Sheva	36	
24	(United States) Casey Prather (2/2)	Hapoel Eilat	48	
25	(United States) Jeremy Pargo (2/2)	Maccabi Rishon LeZion	24	
26	(Nigeria) (Canada) Caleb Agada (4/4)	Hapoel Be'er Sheva	58	
27	(United States) Scottie Wilbekin (2/2)	Maccabi Tel Aviv	26	
28	(Israel) Yam Madar	Hapoel Tel Aviv	29	
29	(United States) Chris Dowe	Maccabi Haifa	31	
30	(United States) (Israel) Max Heidegger	Bnei Herzliya	51	
31	(United States) Joe Ragland	Hapoel Eilat	39	
32	(Israel) Golan Gutt	Maccabi Rishon LeZion	35	
33	(United States) Coty Clarke (2/2)	Bnei Herzliya	37	

=== Monthly Awards ===
==== Player of the Month ====
Month	Player	Team	EFF	Ref.
November	(Nigeria) (Canada) Caleb Agada	Hapoel Be'er Sheva	32.5	
December	(United States) Casey Prather	Hapoel Eilat	26.5	
January–February	(United States) Coty Clarke	Bnei Herzliya	24.6	
March	(United States) Joe Ragland	Hapoel Eilat	26.8	
April	(Nigeria) (Canada) Caleb Agada	Hapoel Be'er Sheva	31.5	

==== Israeli Player of the Month ====
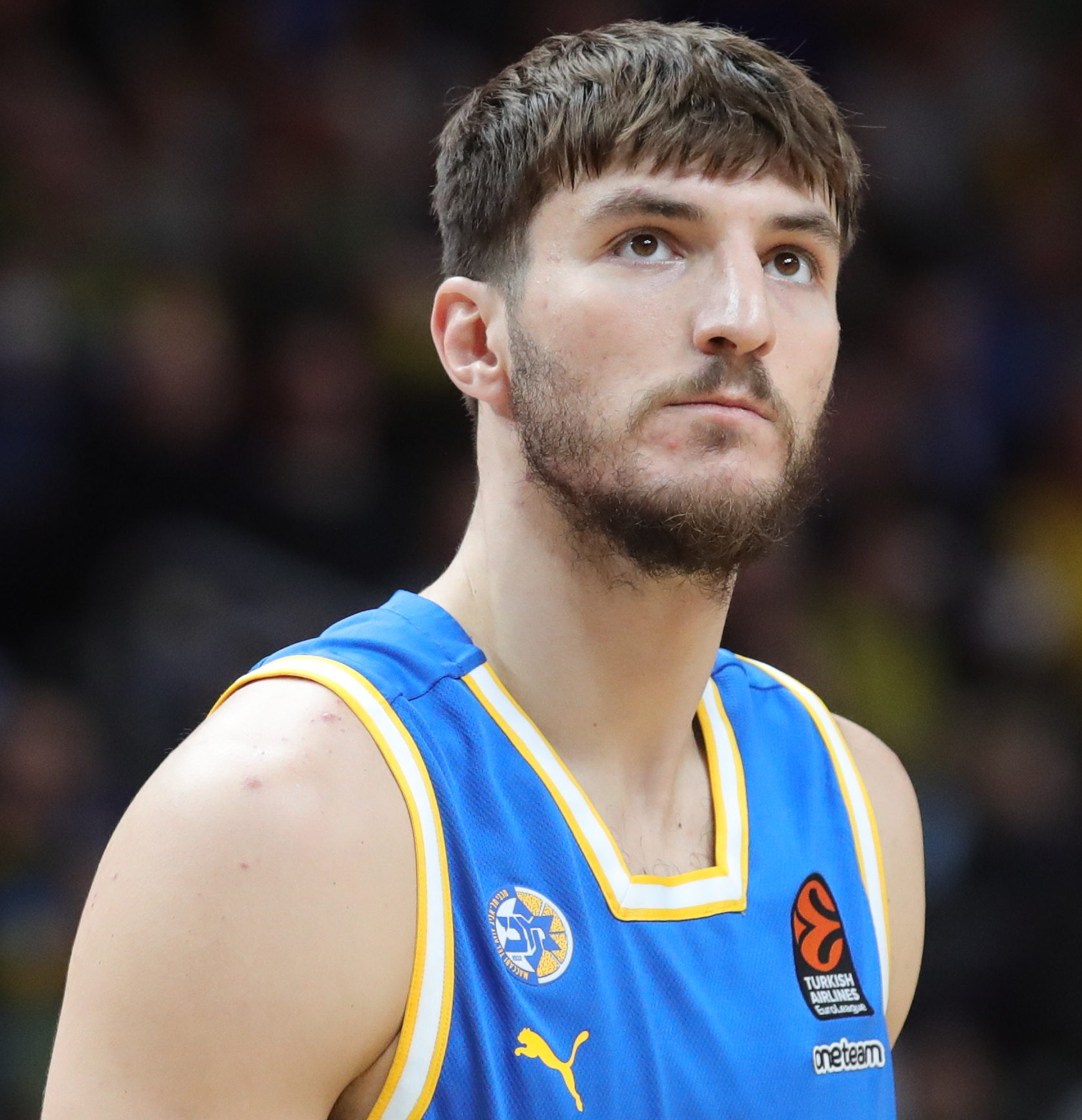
Roman Sorkin

Month	Player	Team	EFF	Ref.
November	(Israel) Tamir Blatt	Hapoel Jerusalem	18.8	
December	(United States) (Israel) Willy Workman	Hapoel Holon	15.2	
January–February	(Israel) Oz Blayzer	Maccabi Tel Aviv	16.9	
March	(Israel) Roman Sorkin	Maccabi Haifa	16.9	
April	(Israel) Yiftach Ziv	Hapoel Gilboa Galil	23.6	

==== Coach of the Month ====
Month	Coach	Team	W-L	Ref.
November	(Israel) Ariel Beit-Halahmy	Hapoel Eilat	5–1	
December	(Greece) Stefanos Dedas	Hapoel Holon	5–0	
January–February	(Israel) Sharon Drucker	Bnei Herzliya	4–3	
March	(Israel) Ariel Beit-Halahmy	Hapoel Eilat	4–0	
April	(Israel) Avishai Gordon	Hapoel Gilboa Galil	4–1	

=== Yearly awards ===
Award	Winner	Team	Ref.
Rising Star	Yair Kravitz	Bnei Herzliya	
Best Defender	Chris Johnson	Hapoel Holon	
Most Improved Player	Noam Dovrat	Maccabi Rishon LeZion	
Sixth Man of the Year	Guy Pnini	Hapoel Holon	
Premier League Top 5 Players	Yiftach Ziv	Hapoel Gilboa Galil	
Premier League Top 5 Players	Chris Johnson	Hapoel Holon	
Premier League Top 5 Players	Scottie Wilbekin	Maccabi Tel Aviv	
Premier League Top 5 Players	Ante Žižić	Maccabi Tel Aviv	
Premier League Top 5 Players	Casey Prather	Hapoel Eilat	
Premier League Second Top 5 Players	Yam Madar	Hapoel Tel Aviv	
Premier League Second Top 5 Players	Keenan Evans	Hapoel Haifa	
Premier League Second Top 5 Players	Caleb Agada	Hapoel Be'er Sheva	
Premier League Second Top 5 Players	Kerry Blackshear Jr.	Hapoel Gilboa Galil	
Premier League Second Top 5 Players	Josh Nebo	Hapoel Eilat	
Regular season MVP	Casey Prather	Hapoel Eilat	
Regular season Israeli MVP	Yiftach Ziv	Hapoel Gilboa Galil	
Coach of the Year	Stefanos Dedas	Hapoel Holon	
Finals MVP	Scottie Wilbekin	Maccabi Tel Aviv	

== Israeli clubs in European competitions ==
Team	Competition	Progress	Balkan League
Maccabi Tel Aviv	EuroLeague	Regular season	—
Maccabi Rishon LeZion	EuroCup	Withdrawn	Second round playoff
Hapoel Jerusalem	Champions League	Regular season	Regular season
Hapoel Holon	Champions League	Quarterfinals	Champion
Hapoel Tel Aviv	Champions League	Qualifying rounds	Second round playoff
Ironi Nes Ziona	FIBA Europe Cup	Champion	Regular season
Bnei Herzliya	—		Regular season
Hapoel Haifa	—		Regular season
Ironi Nahariya	—		Regular season
Hapoel Gilboa Galil	—		3rd place
Maccabi Haifa	—		Regular season
Hapoel Eilat	—		Regular season
Hapoel Be'er Sheva	—		Regular season
