= 2019–20 Israeli Basketball Premier League =

66th season of the Israeli Basketball Premier League

Israeli Basketball Premier League
- Season: 2019–20
- Dates: 5 October 2019 – 28 July 2020
- Teams: 12
- TV partner: Sports Channel

Regular season
- Relegated: Maccabi Ashdod

Finals
- Champions: Maccabi Tel Aviv (54th title)
- Runners-up: Maccabi Rishon LeZion
- Semifinalists: Hapoel Jerusalem; Hapoel Gilboa Galil

The 2019–20 Israeli Basketball Premier League, for sponsorship reasons Ligat Winner, was the 66th season of the Israeli Basketball Premier League. On 13 March 2020, the league was suspended because of the COVID-19 pandemic. The league resumed behind closed doors on 21 June 2020 in a different format.

== Teams ==
Teams of the 2019–20 Israeli Basketball Premier League

Maccabi Haifa has been promoted to the league after winning 2018–19 Liga Leumit after they won Hapoel Galil Elyon 3–1 in the Series Finals, and comes back just one year after their relegation. Meanwhile, Bnei Herzliya was relegated after finishing in the last place the previous season.

=== Stadia and locations ===
Team	Home city	Stadium	Capacity
Hapoel Be'er Sheva	Be'er Sheva	Conch Arena	3,000
Hapoel Eilat	Eilat	Begin Arena	1,490
Hapoel Gilboa Galil	Gilboa Regional Council	Gan Ner Sports Hall	2,100
Hapoel Holon	Holon	Holon Toto Hall	5,500
Hapoel Jerusalem	Jerusalem	Pais Arena	11,000
Hapoel Tel Aviv	Tel Aviv	Drive in Arena	3,504
Ironi Nahariya	Nahariya	Ein Sarah	2,500
Ironi Nes Ziona	Ness Ziona	Lev Hamoshava	1,200
Maccabi Ashdod	Ashdod	HaKiriya Arena	2,200
Maccabi Haifa	Haifa	Romema Arena	5,000
Maccabi Rishon LeZion	Rishon LeZion	Beit Maccabi Rishon	2,500
Maccabi Tel Aviv	Tel Aviv	Menora Mivtachim Arena	10,383

=== Personnel and sponsorship ===
Team	Chairman	Head coach	Team captain	Kit manufacturer	Main sponsor
Hapoel Be'er Sheva	(Israel) Kfir Arazi	(Israel) Rami Hadar	(United States) (Israel) Spencer Weisz	Spalding	Altshuler Shaham
Hapoel Eilat	(Israel) Nachi Indik	(Israel) Eric Alfasi	(Israel) Avi Ben-Chimol	Peak	Yossi Avrahami
Hapoel Gilboa Galil	(Israel) Haim Ohayon	(Israel) Lior Lubin	(Israel) Netanel Artzi	Peak	Gilboa Regional Council
Hapoel Holon	(Israel) Shlomo Issac	(Greece) Stefanos Dedas	(Israel) Shlomi Harush	Peak	UNET
Hapoel Jerusalem	(Israel) Eyal Chomski	(Israel) Oded Kattash	(Israel) Bar Timor	Peak	Bank Yahav
Hapoel Tel Aviv	(Israel) Rami Cohen	(Greece) Ioannis Kastritis	(Israel) Tomer Ginat	Peak	SP Metzer
Ironi Nahariya	(Israel) Nissim Alfasi	(Israel) Danny Franco	(United States) Tony Gaffney	Peak	
Ironi Nes Ziona	(Israel) Yaniv Mizrahi	(Israel) Nadav Zilberstein	(Israel) Tal Dunne	Kappa	Chai Motors
Maccabi Ashdod	(Israel) Armaund Asulin	(Israel) Amit Tamir	(Israel) Lior Eliyahu	AND1	SCE
Maccabi Haifa	(United States) Jeff Rosen	(Venezuela) Daniel Seoane	(United States) (Israel) Willy Workman	Joma	
Maccabi Rishon LeZion	(Israel) Itzhak Peri	(Israel) Guy Goodes	(Israel) Oz Blayzer	Under Armour	Winner
Maccabi Tel Aviv	(Israel) Shimon Mizrahi	(Greece) Ioannis Sfairopoulos	(United States) (Israel) John DiBartolomeo	Nike	FOX

=== Managerial changes ===
Departure date	Team	Outgoing head coach	Reason	Hire date	Incoming head coach	Ref.
December 5, 2019	Hapoel Holon	(Israel) Sharon Drucker	Fired	December 22, 2019	(Greece) Stefanos Dedas	
January 18, 2020	Hapoel Tel Aviv	(Israel) Ariel Beit-Halahmy	Fired	January 27, 2020	(Greece) Ioannis Kastritis	
May 12, 2020	Maccabi Ashdod	(United States) Brad Greenberg	Resigned	May 15, 2020	(Israel) Amit Tamir	

== Regular season ==
Pos	Team	Pld	W	L	GF	GA	GD	PCT	Qualification or relegation
1	Maccabi Tel Aviv	22	20	2	2005	1670	+335	.909	Advance to the Top-teams League Group
2	Hapoel Jerusalem	22	18	4	1975	1752	+223	.818	Advance to the Top-teams League Group
3	Maccabi Rishon LeZion	22	13	9	1802	1704	+98	.591	Advance to the Top-teams League Group
4	Hapoel Holon	22	12	10	1910	1925	−15	.545	Advance to the Top-teams League Group
5	Maccabi Haifa	22	11	11	1865	1845	+20	.500	Advance to the Bottom-Teams League Group
6	Ironi Nes Ziona	22	10	12	1879	1926	−47	.455	Advance to the Bottom-Teams League Group
7	Hapoel Tel Aviv	22	9	13	1860	1907	−47	.409	Advance to the Bottom-Teams League Group
8	Ironi Nahariya	22	9	13	1797	1861	−64	.409	Advance to the Bottom-Teams League Group
9	Hapoel Eilat	22	9	13	1826	1883	−57	.409	Advance to the Bottom-Teams League Group
10	Hapoel Gilboa Galil	22	9	13	1888	1976	−88	.409	Advance to the Bottom-Teams League Group
11	Hapoel Be'er Sheva	22	8	14	1784	1897	−113	.364	Advance to the Bottom-Teams League Group
12	Maccabi Ashdod	22	4	18	1730	1975	−245	.182	Advance to the Bottom-Teams League Group

Updated to match(es) played on June 22, 2020. Source: Basket.co.il

=== Rounds 1 to 22 ===
Home \ Away	MTA	HJE	MRL	HHO	MHA	INZ	HTA	INA	HEI	HGG	HBS	MAS
Maccabi Tel Aviv		89–73	75–64	94–76	91–77	80–71	84–74	86–65	102–86	99–76	98–74	114–82
Hapoel Jerusalem	98–87		84–78	91–84	95–81	102–71	80–91	85–55	83–74	88–73	108–74	72–51
Maccabi Rishon LeZion	66–81	65–73		84–59	62–54	75–79	94–85	76–63	80–74	90–64	80–72	67–66
Hapoel Holon	83–94	112–115	105–104		88–82	99–80	89–75	86–78	90–85	87–81	92–73	103–86
Maccabi Haifa	75–93	95–87	88–79	92–60		84–87	72–92	84–78	107–85	95–83	95–80	91–80
Ironi Nes Ziona	68–91	81–93	93–88	78–87	98–91		95–80	83–88	101–69	106–115	83–76	88–97
Hapoel Tel Aviv	84–91	72–90	74–77	86–90	88–81	90–95		96–88	70–87	96–93	102–97	100–93
Ironi Nahariya	62–89	82–88	118–114	95–109	82–87	71–79	86–84		84–89	94–76	87–74	84–68
Hapoel Eilat	86–81	84–99	72–94	90–81	87–76	103–89	71–84	61–63		79–78	87–92	98–78
Hapoel Gilboa Galil	110–112	98–93	75–96	95–88	84–93	96–80	68–85	76–95	76–74		100–73	95–83
Hapoel Be'er Sheva	63–80	86–94	69–75	85–73	75–77	82–81	103–76	87–83	88–87	81–85		101–77
Maccabi Ashdod	57–94	69–84	81–94	82–69	91–88	69–93	83–76	84–96	87–98	89–91	77–79	

Updated to match(es) played on June 22, 2020. Source: Basket.co.il
Legend: Blue = home team win; Red = away team win.

== Top-teams League Group ==
Pos	Team	Pld	W	L	GF	GA	GD	PCT	Qualification or relegation
1	Maccabi Tel Aviv	28	24	4	2554	2144	+410	.857	Advance to the playoffs
2	Hapoel Jerusalem	28	22	6	2513	2238	+275	.786	Advance to the playoffs
3	Maccabi Rishon LeZion	28	17	11	2330	2207	+123	.607	Advance to the playoffs
4	Hapoel Holon	28	12	16	2347	2514	−167	.429	Advance to the playoffs

Updated to match(es) played on July 12, 2020. Source: Basket.co.il

Home \ Away	MTA	HJE	MRL	HHO
Maccabi Tel Aviv		86–80	77–86	103–65
Hapoel Jerusalem	82–93		93–86	102–67
Maccabi Rishon LeZion	92–90	73–88		98–81
Hapoel Holon	69–100	81–93	74–93	

Updated to match(es) played on July 12, 2020. Source: Basket.co.il
Legend: Blue = home team win; Red = away team win.

=== Positions by round ===
Team ╲ Round	23	24	25	26	27	28
Maccabi Tel Aviv	1	1	1	1	1	1
Hapoel Jerusalem	2	2	2	2	2	2
Maccabi Rishon LeZion	3	3	3	3	3	3
Hapoel Holon	4	4	4	4	4	4

Advance to the playoffs

== Bottom-Teams League Group ==
Pos	Team	Pld	W	L	GF	GA	GD	PCT	Qualification or relegation
5	Hapoel Gilboa Galil	29	16	13	2498	2530	−32	.552	Advance to the playoffs
6	Maccabi Haifa	29	15	14	2455	2431	+24	.517	Advance to the playoffs
7	Ironi Nes Ziona	29	13	16	2476	2566	−90	.448	Advance to the playoffs
8	Hapoel Tel Aviv	29	13	16	2460	2466	−6	.448	Advance to the playoffs
9	Hapoel Be'er Sheva	29	12	17	2340	2465	−125	.414	
10	Hapoel Eilat	28	11	17	2316	2392	−76	.393	
11	Ironi Nahariya	28	11	17	2276	2319	−43	.393	
12	Maccabi Ashdod (R)	29	5	24	2341	2634	−293	.172	Relegation to Liga Leumit

Updated to match(es) played on July 13, 2020. Source: Basket.co.il
(R) Relegated

Home \ Away	MHA	INZ	HTA	INA	HEI	HGG	HBS	MAS
Maccabi Haifa		94–79		66–82	82–90	80–81		
Ironi Nes Ziona			75–105		88–80		83–85	99–97
Hapoel Tel Aviv	79–82			77–73	69–60	82–81		
Ironi Nahariya		89–91			Canceled		67–69	86–68
Hapoel Eilat						83–95	84–88	93–87
Hapoel Gilboa Galil		90–82		87–82			83–65	
Hapoel Be'er Sheva	83–87		84–81					85–80
Maccabi Ashdod	92–99		106–105			81–92		

Updated to match(es) played on July 13, 2020. Source: Basket.co.il
Legend: Blue = home team win; Red = away team win.

=== Positions by round ===
Team ╲ Round	23	24	25	26	27	28	29
Maccabi Haifa	5	5	5	5	5	6	6
Ironi Nes Ziona	9	8	11	8	7	7	7
Hapoel Tel Aviv	10	10	8	9	8	8	8
Ironi Nahariya	6	9	9	10	10	11	11
Hapoel Eilat	8	7	7	11	11	10	10
Hapoel Gilboa Galil	7	6	6	6	6	5	5
Hapoel Be'er Sheva	11	11	10	7	9	9	9
Maccabi Ashdod	12	12	12	12	12	12	12

Advance to the playoffs
Relegation to Liga Leumit

== Playoffs ==
The first round of the playoffs is played in a best-of-three format, with the higher seeded team playing the first (and the second at home if is necessary).

Team 1	Series	Team 2	Game 1	Game 2	Game 3
Maccabi Tel Aviv	2–1	Hapoel Tel Aviv	67–66	72–82	83–68
Hapoel Holon	1–2	Hapoel Gilboa Galil	80–77	65–99	82–87
Maccabi Rishon LeZion	2–0	Maccabi Haifa	87–72	101–82	—
Hapoel Jerusalem	2–0	Ironi Nes Ziona	104–79	114–87	—

== Final Four ==
=== Bracket ===
Semifinals
26 July
Maccabi Tel Aviv	81
Hapoel Gilboa Galil	78
26 July
Hapoel Jerusalem	97
Maccabi Rishon LeZion	100

Championship game
28 July
Maccabi Tel Aviv	86
Maccabi Rishon LeZion	81

=== Semifinals ===
26 July 2020	Maccabi Tel Aviv	81–78	Hapoel Gilboa Galil	Tel Aviv
21:15	Scoring by quarter: 24–22, 19–14, 21–15, 17–27
Sport 5	Pts: Dorsey 20; Rebs: Avdija 9 Asts: Caloiaro 4 PIR: Wilbekin, Dorsey 18	Boxscore	Pts: Ziv 23; Rebs: Mitchell 8 Asts: Thomasson 4 PIR: Ziv 23	Arena: Menora Mivtachim Arena; Referees: Amit Balak, Kfir Mualem, Dan Yalon

26 July 2020	Hapoel Jerusalem	97–100	Maccabi Rishon LeZion	Tel Aviv
18:30	Scoring by quarter: 17–32, 20–18, 41–27, 19–23
Sport 5	Pts: Pargo 32; Rebs: Braimoh 10; Asts: Feldeine 4 PIR: Pargo 28	Boxscore	Pts: Harrison 21; Rebs: Harrison 8 Asts: Monroe 7 PIR: Hankins 22	Arena: Menora Mivtachim Arena; Referees: Omer Esteron, Ofer Manheim, Shaul Yahalom

=== Final ===
28 July 2020	Maccabi Tel Aviv	86–81	Maccabi Rishon LeZion	Tel Aviv
21:00	Scoring by quarter: 29–21, 25–15, 15–23, 17–22
Sport 5	Pts: Stoudemire 18; Rebs: Hunter 8 Asts: Wilbekin 6 PIR: Hunter 24	Boxscore	Pts: Harrison 38; Rebs: Harrison, Monroe 6 Asts: Harrison 5 PIR: Harrison 48	Arena: Menora Mivtachim Arena; Referees: Sefi Shemesh, Erez Gurion, Zahi Habdali

2019–20 Israeli Premier League champions
Maccabi Tel Aviv
54th title

== Awards ==
=== MVP of the Round ===
Round	Player	Team	EFF	Ref.
October
1	(United States) (Israel) T. J. Cline	Hapoel Holon	27	
2	(United States) Alex Hamilton (1/3)	Maccabi Rishon LeZion	36	
3	(Israel) Lior Eliyahu (1/2)	Maccabi Ashdod	26	
4	(United States) Scottie Wilbekin (1/2)	Maccabi Tel Aviv	34	
November
5	(Israel) Rafi Menco (1/2)	Hapoel Eilat	20	
6	(United States) Dominic Waters	Ironi Nahariya	32	
December
8	(United States) Jarmar Gulley (1/2)	Hapoel Gilboa Galil	42	
8	(United States) Justin Tillman	Hapoel Gilboa Galil	29	
9	(Dominican Republic) James Feldeine	Hapoel Jerusalem	44	
10	(United States) Alex Hamilton (2/3)	Maccabi Rishon LeZion	33	
11	(United States) (Israel) Jake Cohen	Maccabi Tel Aviv	42	
12	(Israel) Lior Eliyahu (2/2)	Maccabi Ashdod	30	
January
13	(United States) Alex Hamilton (3/3)	Maccabi Rishon LeZion	43	
14	(United States) Jordan Hamilton	Hapoel Tel Aviv	33	
15	(Dominican Republic) Édgar Sosa	Hapoel Gilboa Galil	37	
16	(United States) Jarmar Gulley (2/2)	Hapoel Gilboa Galil	51	
17	(Venezuela) Gregory Vargas (1/2)	Maccabi Haifa	22	
February
18	(Venezuela) Gregory Vargas (2/2)	Maccabi Haifa	33	
19	(Israel) Rafi Menco (2/2)	Hapoel Eilat	37	
March
20	(United States) Jeff Withey	Ironi Nes Ziona	35	
21	(United States) Manny Harris	Hapoel Holon	41	
June
22	(Israel) Ziv Ben-Zvi	Hapoel Eilat	28	
23	(Israel) Tamir Blatt	Hapoel Jerusalem	24	
24	(United States) Scottie Wilbekin (2/2)	Maccabi Tel Aviv	28	
July
25	(United States) Evan Bruinsma	Hapoel Be'er Sheva	42	
26	(United States) Cameron Oliver	Ironi Nes Ziona	39	
27	(Israel) Yiftach Ziv	Hapoel Gilboa Galil	25	
28	(United States) JP Tokoto	Ironi Nes Ziona	41	
29	(United States) Andrew Andrews	Maccabi Haifa	36	
QR1	(United States) D'Angelo Harrison	Maccabi Rishon LeZion	35	
QR2	(Israel) Yam Madar	Hapoel Tel Aviv	24	

=== Monthly Awards ===
==== Player of the Month ====
Month	Player	Team	EFF	Ref.
October	(United States) Justin Tillman	Hapoel Gilboa Galil	31.3	
November	(United States) Jeff Withey	Ironi Nes Ziona	29.0	
December	(United States) (Israel) Jake Cohen	Maccabi Tel Aviv	23.8	
January	(United States) Jarmar Gulley	Hapoel Gilboa Galil	28.2	

==== Israeli Player of the Month ====
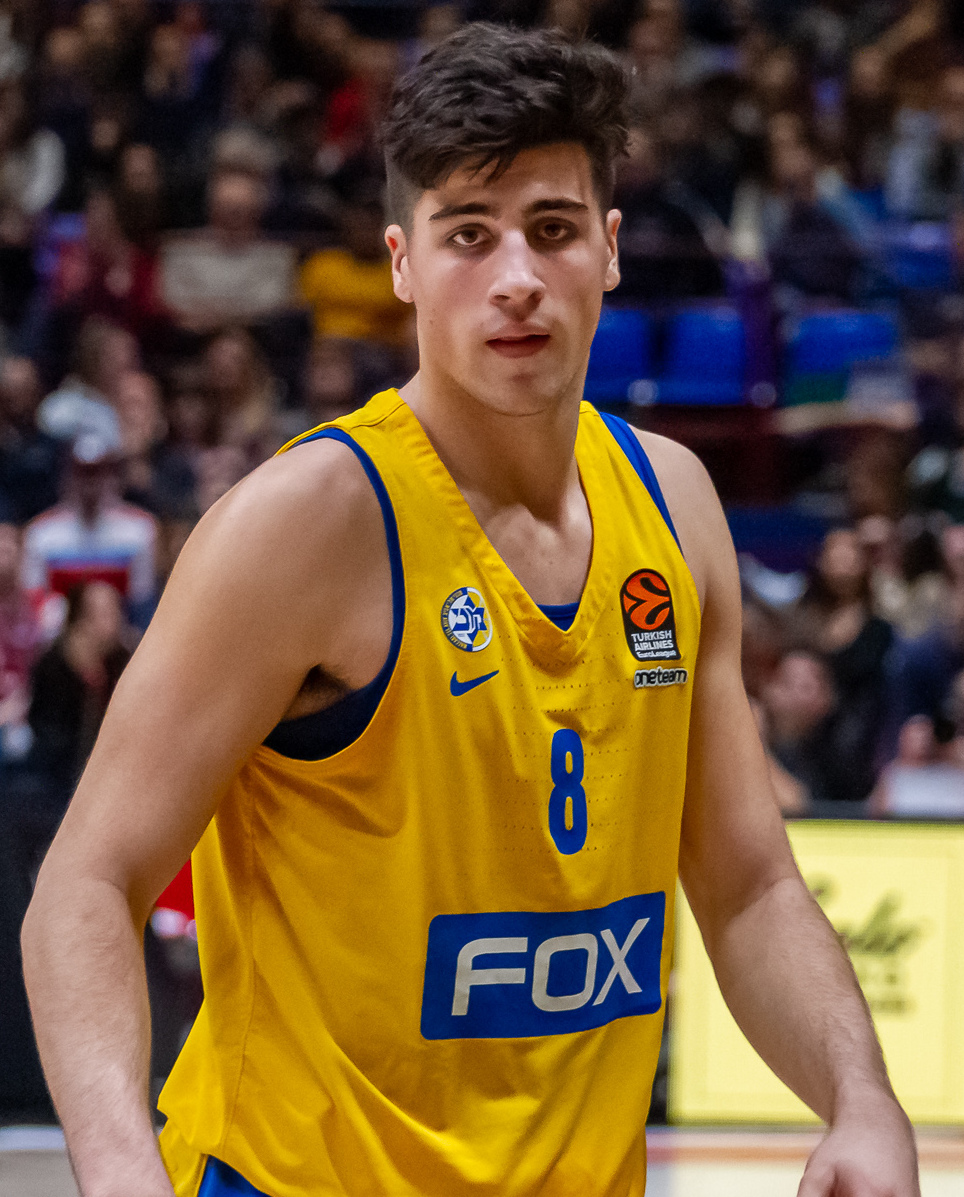
Deni Avdija

Month	Player	Team	EFF	Ref.
October	(Israel) Omri Casspi	Maccabi Tel Aviv	15.5	
November	(Israel) Raviv Limonad	Ironi Nes Ziona	17.4	
December	–	–	–	–
January	(Israel) Deni Avdija	Maccabi Tel Aviv	18.3	

==== Coach of the Month ====
Month	Coach	Team	W-L	Ref.
October	(Israel) Lior Lubin	Hapoel Gilboa Galil	3–0	
November	(Israel) Nadav Zilberstein	Ironi Nes Ziona	2–0	
December	(Greece) Ioannis Sfairopoulos	Maccabi Tel Aviv	5–0	
January	(Greece) Stefanos Dedas	Hapoel Holon	4–1	

== Israeli clubs in European competitions ==
Team	Competition	Progress
Maccabi Tel Aviv	**EuroLeague**	~~**Regular season**~~
Maccabi Rishon LeZion	**EuroCup**	Regular season
Hapoel Jerusalem	**Champions League**	Final Eight
Hapoel Holon	**Champions League**	Regular season
Ironi Nes Ziona	**FIBA Europe Cup**	Second round

- **Bold** – still active.
- ~~Strike~~ – Season canceled due to the COVID-19 pandemic.

== See also ==
- 2019–20 Israeli Basketball National League
- 2019–20 Israeli Basketball State Cup
- 2019 Israeli Basketball League Cup
