= Ante Žižić =

Croatian basketball player (born 1997)

- Žižić with Beşiktaş in 2026

No. 41 – Beşiktaş Fuzul
- Position: Center
- League: Basketbol Süper Ligi

Personal information
- Born: 4 January 1997 (age 29) Split, Croatia
- Listed height: 2.10 m (6 ft 11 in)
- Listed weight: 121 kg (267 lb)

Career information
- NBA draft: 2016: 1st round, 23rd overall pick
- Drafted by: Boston Celtics
- Playing career: 2013–present

Career history
- 2013–2014: Kaštela
- 2014–2016: Cibona
- 2014: →Gorica
- 2016–2017: Darüşşafaka
- 2017–2020: Cleveland Cavaliers
- 2017–2018: →Canton Charge
- 2020–2022: Maccabi Tel Aviv
- 2022–2023: Anadolu Efes
- 2023–2025: Virtus Bologna
- 2025–present: Beşiktaş

Career highlights
- All-EuroCup First Team (2026); FIBA Europe Cup Starting Five (2016); Italian League champion (2025); Turkish League champion (2023); Turkish Super Cup winner (2022); Turkish Super Cup MVP (2022); Israeli League champion (2021); All-Israeli League First Team (2021); Israeli Cup winner (2021); 2× Israeli League Cup winner (2020, 2021); ABA League Top Prospect (2016); ABA League rebounding leader (2016)
- Stats at NBA.com
- Stats at Basketball Reference
Medals
Men's basketball
Representing Croatia
FIBA U19 World Cup
Silver medal – second place	2015 Greece	U-19 Team
FIBA U18 Europe Championship
Bronze medal – third place	2014 Turkey	U-18 Team

Ante Toni Žižić (Croatian pronunciation: [antɛ ʐǐːʐitɕ]; born 4 January 1997) is a Croatian professional basketball player for Beşiktaş of the Basketbol Süper Ligi (BSL). He was selected 23rd overall by the Boston Celtics in the 2016 NBA draft. He played in the NBA Finals as a member of the Cleveland Cavaliers in 2018.

== Professional career ==
=== Kaštela (2013–2014) ===
Žižić's first team was KK Split, in the 2013–14 season, but he played for their junior team, in which he only played in 3 games. He then moved to the Cedevita Zagreb's junior team, and with them he played in 5 games.

=== Gorica (2014) ===
To start the 2014–15 season, Žižić played for Gorica.

=== Cibona (2014–2016) ===
Žižiće moved to Cibona Zagreb for the rest of the season. In that year, he averaged 7.4 points, 0.3 assists, 0.3 steals, and 0.9 blocks, in 15.5 minutes per game, in 25 games played in the Adriatic League. His breakout season was in the 2015–16 season.

He was named the 2015–16 ABA League season's top prospect. In that season, he averaged 12.7 points, 7.2 rebounds, and 1.2 blocks in 24.8 minutes per game, in 26 games played in the Adriatic League. He was also named to the European-wide 3rd-tier-level FIBA Europe Cup's Starting Five Team of the 2015–16 season.

On 11 October 2016, Žižić was named the MVP of the fourth week of the 2016–17 ABA League season. He scored 37 points and grabbed 20 rebounds in Cibona's 89–85 win over MZT Skopje Aerodrom, in a game that was decided after double overtime.

=== Darüşşafaka (2016–2017) ===
On 27 December 2016, Žižić left Cibona, and signed with the Turkish team Darüşşafaka Doğuş, of the Turkish Super League.

With Darüşşafaka, Žižić made his debut in the European top-tier level, the EuroLeague, on 30 December 2016, in an 81–77 road loss against FC Barcelona. In his first EuroLeague game, Žižić had 4 points, 6 rebounds, 2 steals, and 2 blocks.

=== Cleveland Cavaliers (2017–2020) ===
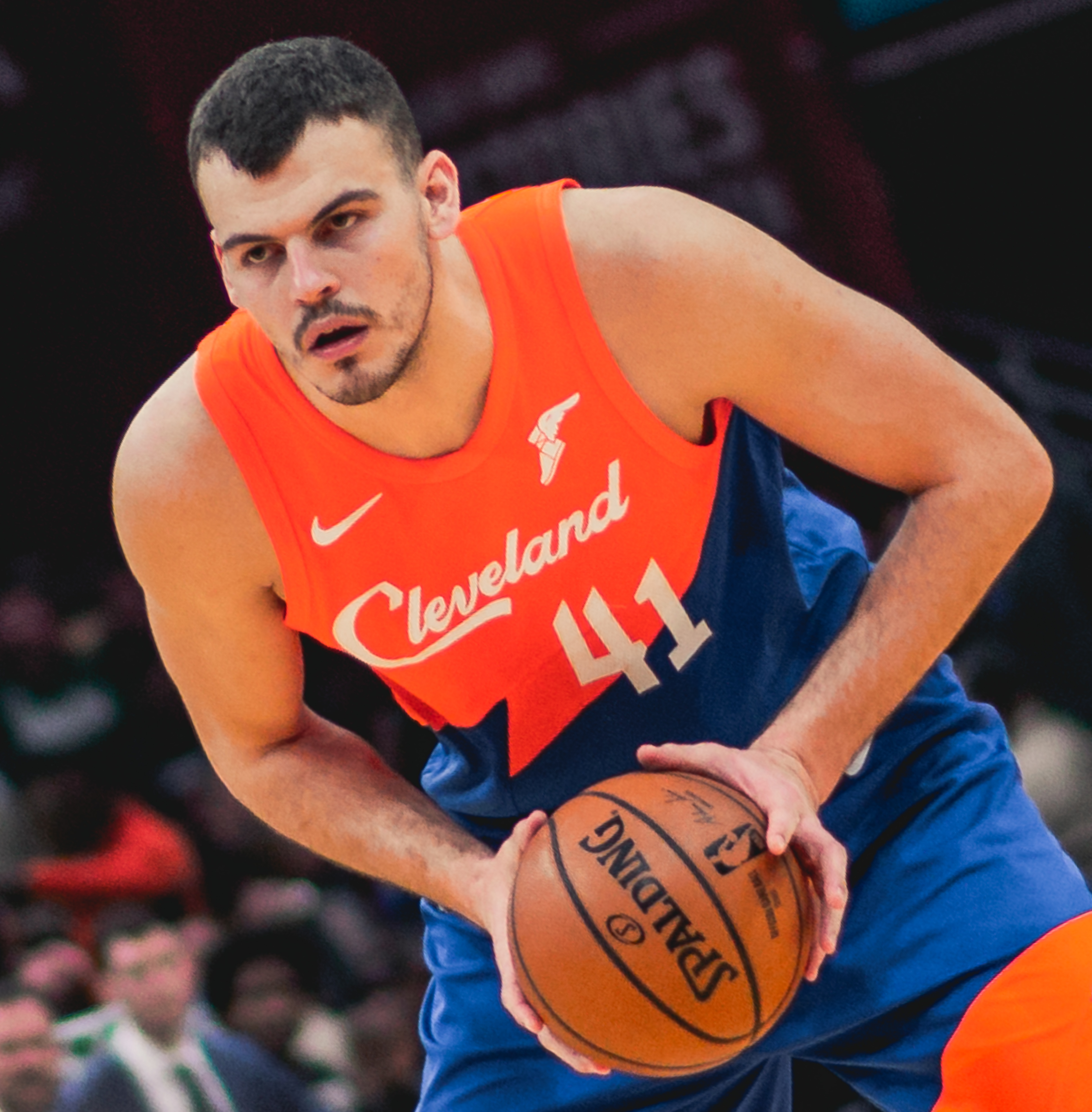
Žižić with the Cleveland Cavaliers in 2019

Žižić was selected with the 23rd overall pick in the 2016 NBA draft, by the Boston Celtics.

On 1 July 2017, Žižić signed with the Boston Celtics. Before even suiting up for a single regular-season game for the Celtics, Žižić was traded to the Cleveland Cavaliers alongside Isaiah Thomas, Jae Crowder, and the Brooklyn Nets' unprotected 2018 first-round pick for Kyrie Irving on 22 August 2017. However, eight days after the trade was first confirmed, the Celtics would also add a 2020 second-round pick from the Miami Heat in order to fully complete the deal to satisfy Cleveland's worries involving Thomas's hip injury.

Žižić spent time with the Canton Charge during his rookie season. On 11 March, he scored 15 points and recorded 7 rebounds (both career highs) in a loss to the Los Angeles Lakers. In the last game of the regular season, he scored 20 points and recorded 7 rebounds. The Cavaliers made it to the 2018 NBA Finals, but lost the series 4–0 to the Golden State Warriors.

=== Maccabi Tel Aviv (2020–2022) ===
On 25 August 2020, Žižić signed a two-year deal with Israeli team Maccabi Tel Aviv. In 2020–21, he led the league with a .699 field goal percentage, and was 10th in the Euroleague with 0.8 blocks per game.

On 9 May 2022, during a game against Hapoel Haifa, Žižić lost consciousness after hitting his head on the ground. He was rushed to a hospital and regained consciousness later that night.

On 21 June 2022, Žižić officially parted ways with the Israeli club after two seasons.

=== Anadolu Efes (2022–2023) ===
On 22 June 2022, Žižić signed a three-year (2+1) contract with Turkish club Anadolu Efes, the reigning back-to-back EuroLeague champions.

=== Virtus Bologna (2023–2025) ===
On 31 December 2023, Žižić signed a two-year contract with Italian powerhouse Virtus Bologna. Despite an impressive first half of the season, Virtus ended the EuroLeague regular season at the 10th place, qualifying only for the play-in, where after having defeated 67–64 Anadolu Efes, it lost against Baskonia 89–77, not qualifying for the playoffs. Moreover, the Black V placed first during the Italian regular season but, after having knocked out Tortona by 3–2 and Reyer Venezia by 3–1, it lost the third consecutive final against Milan by 3–1.

In the following season Virtus ended the EuroLeague at the 17th place, after a disappointing regular season. After arriving first in the national championship season, Virtus eliminated Venezia 3–2 and their arch-rival Milan 3–1, reaching their fifth finals in a row. They then defeated Brescia 3–0, claiming the Italian championship title for the 17th time.

=== Beşiktaş (2025–present) ===
On 1 July 2025, Žižić signed with Beşiktaş Gain of the Basketbol Süper Ligi (BSL). On 7 June 2026, it was announced that Žižić would require surgery to repair an AC joint injury in his left shoulder.

== National team career ==
Žižić played with the junior national teams of Croatia. With Croatia's junior national teams, he played at the 2013 FIBA Europe Under-16 Championship, the 2014 FIBA Europe Under-18 Championship, where he won a bronze medal, and at the 2015 FIBA Under-19 World Championship, where he won a silver medal.

== Personal life ==
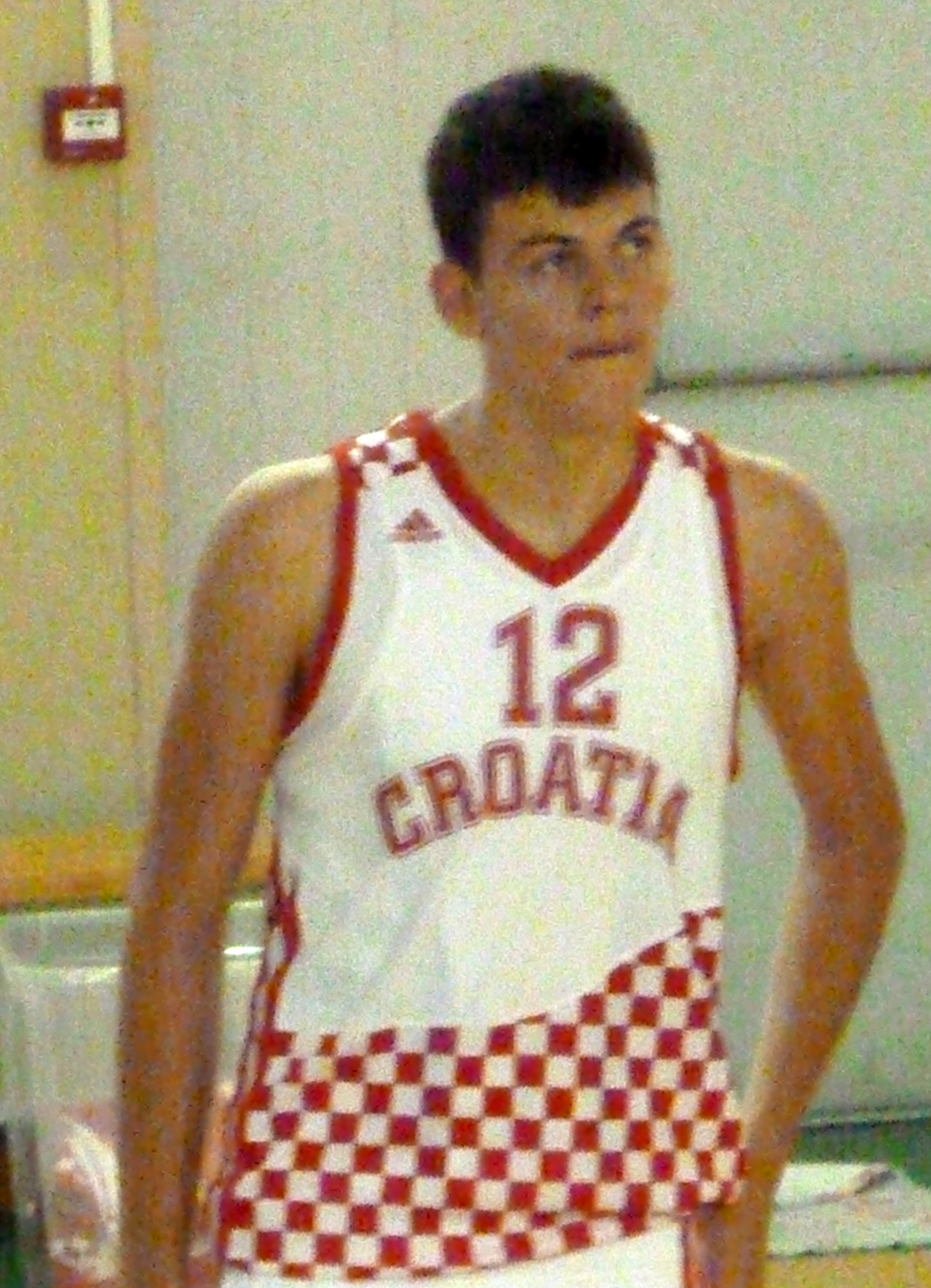
Žižić at an U16 tournament in 2013

Žižić's older brother, Andrija, is a former professional basketball player. The two brothers were teammates at Cibona Zagreb during the 2015–16 season. His older brother played in 107 EuroLeague games with Cibona Zagreb, FC Barcelona, Olympiacos and Panathinaikos, and he also won a EuroLeague championship with Maccabi Tel Aviv.

== Career statistics ==
Legend
GP	Games played	GS	Games started	MPG	Minutes per game
FG%	Field-goal percentage	3P%	3-point field-goal percentage	FT%	Free-throw percentage
RPG	Rebounds per game	APG	Assists per game	SPG	Steals per game
BPG	Blocks per game	PPG	Points per game	PIR	Performance index rating
**Bold**	Career high

=== NBA ===
==== Regular season ====
Year	Team	GP	GS	MPG	FG%	3P%	FT%	RPG	APG	SPG	BPG	PPG
2017–18	Cleveland	32	2	6.7	**.731**	–	.724	1.9	.2	.1	**.4**	3.7
2018–19	Cleveland	**59**	**25**	**18.3**	.553	–	.705	**5.4**	**.9**	.2	**.4**	**7.8**
2019–20	Cleveland	22	0	10.0	.569	–	**.737**	3.0	.3	**.3**	.2	4.4
Career		113	27	13.4	.581	–	.711	3.9	.6	.2	.4	6.0

==== Playoffs ====
Year	Team	GP	GS	MPG	FG%	3P%	FT%	RPG	APG	SPG	BPG	PPG
2018	Cleveland	8	0	2.9	.500	-	.500	.8	.1	.0	.1	1.6
Career		8	0	2.9	.500	-	.500	.8	.1	.0	.1	1.6

=== EuroLeague ===
Year	Team	GP	GS	MPG	FG%	3P%	FT%	RPG	APG	SPG	BPG	PPG	PIR
2016–17	Darüşşafaka	20	17	**21.9**	.649	—	.643	**6.7**	.4	.2	**.8**	9.0	13.3
2020–21	Maccabi	**34**	**30**	19.9	.589	—	**.771**	5.4	**.7**	.4	**.8**	9.1	11.4
2021–22	Maccabi	31	28	21.1	.667	—	.730	5.0	.6	**.5**	**.8**	**12.2**	**15.5**
2022–23	Anadolu Efes	31	13	15.7	.703	—	.655	3.7	**.7**	.4	.3	7.7	10.0
2023–24	Anadolu Efes	13	7	15.8	**.714**	—	.700	2.8	**.7**	**.5**	.2	6.5	9.0
2023–24	Bologna	17	3	13.0	.574	—	.400	2.6	.5	.1	.6	3.5	4.5
Career		146	98	18.4	.646	—	.686	4.6	.6	.4	.6	8.6	11.2

== See also ==
- List of European basketball players in the United States
