= Keenan Evans =

American basketball player

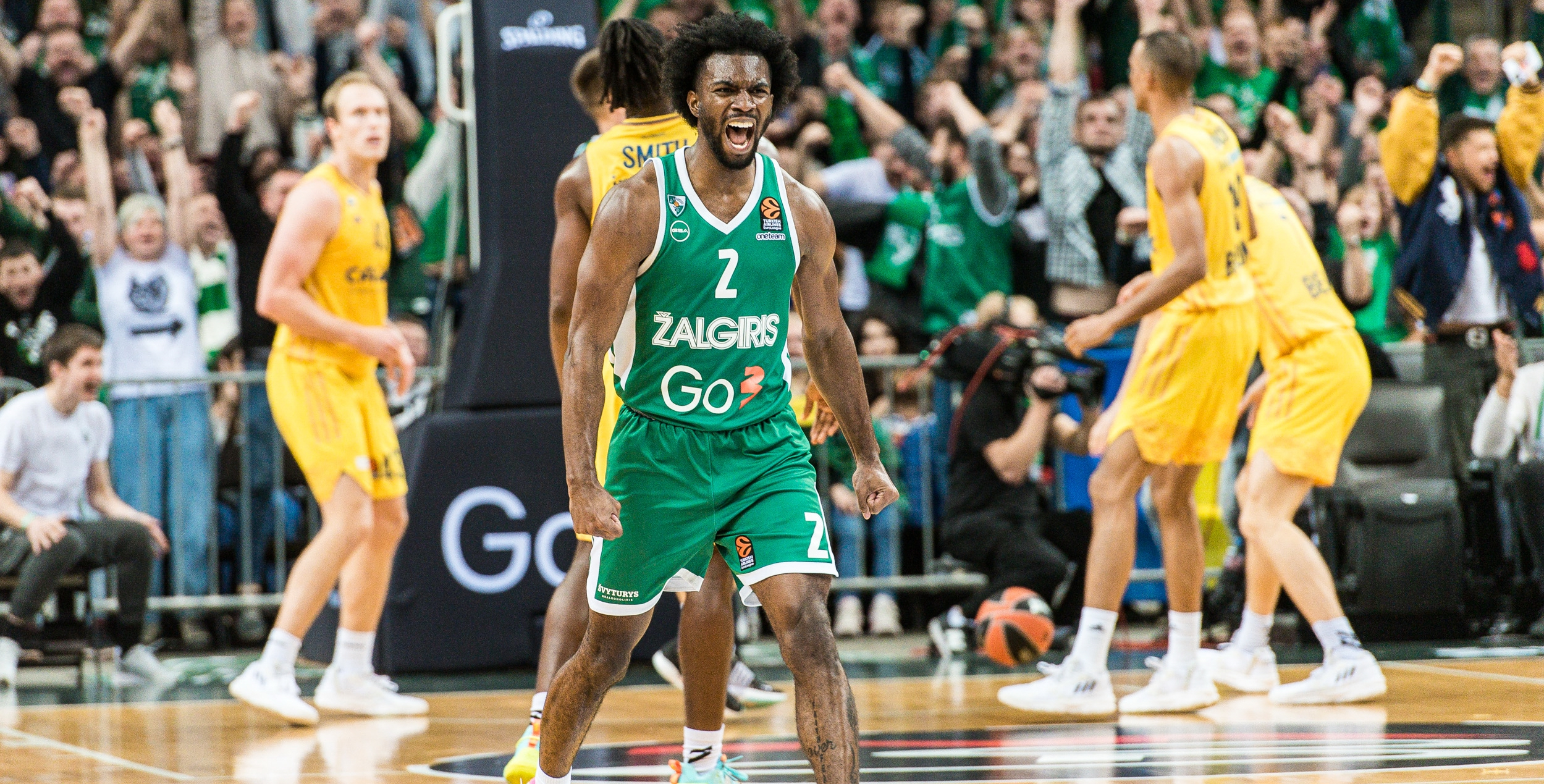
- Evans with Žalgiris Kaunas in 2022

No. 34 – Žalgiris Kaunas
- Position: Shooting guard / point guard
- League: LKL; EuroLeague

Personal information
- Born: August 23, 1996 (age 30) Richardson, Texas, U.S.
- Listed height: 6 ft 3 in (1.91 m)
- Listed weight: 190 lb (86 kg)

Career information
- High school: Berkner (Richardson, Texas)
- College: Texas Tech (2014–2018)
- NBA draft: 2018: undrafted
- Playing career: 2018–present

Career history
- 2018–2019: Grand Rapids Drive
- 2019: Delaware Blue Coats
- 2019–2020: Igokea
- 2020–2021: Hapoel Haifa
- 2021–2022: Maccabi Tel Aviv
- 2022–2024: Žalgiris Kaunas
- 2024–2026: Olympiacos
- 2026–present: Žalgiris Kaunas
- 2026: →London Lions

Career highlights
- EuroLeague champion (2026); LKL champion (2023); 2× King Mindaugas Cup winner (2023, 2024); 2× Greek League champion (2025, 2026); 2× Greek Supercup winner (2024, 2025); Bosnian League champion (2020); Bosnian League MVP (2020); All-Bosnian League Team (2020); Israeli League Cup winner (2021); All-Israeli Premier League Second Team (2021); Consensus second-team All-American (2018); First-team All-Big 12 (2018); Third-team All-Big 12 (2017)
- Stats at Basketball Reference

Keenan Evans (born August 23, 1996) is an American professional basketball player for Žalgiris Kaunas of the Lithuanian Basketball League (LKL) and the EuroLeague. He played college basketball for the Texas Tech Red Raiders.

== College career ==
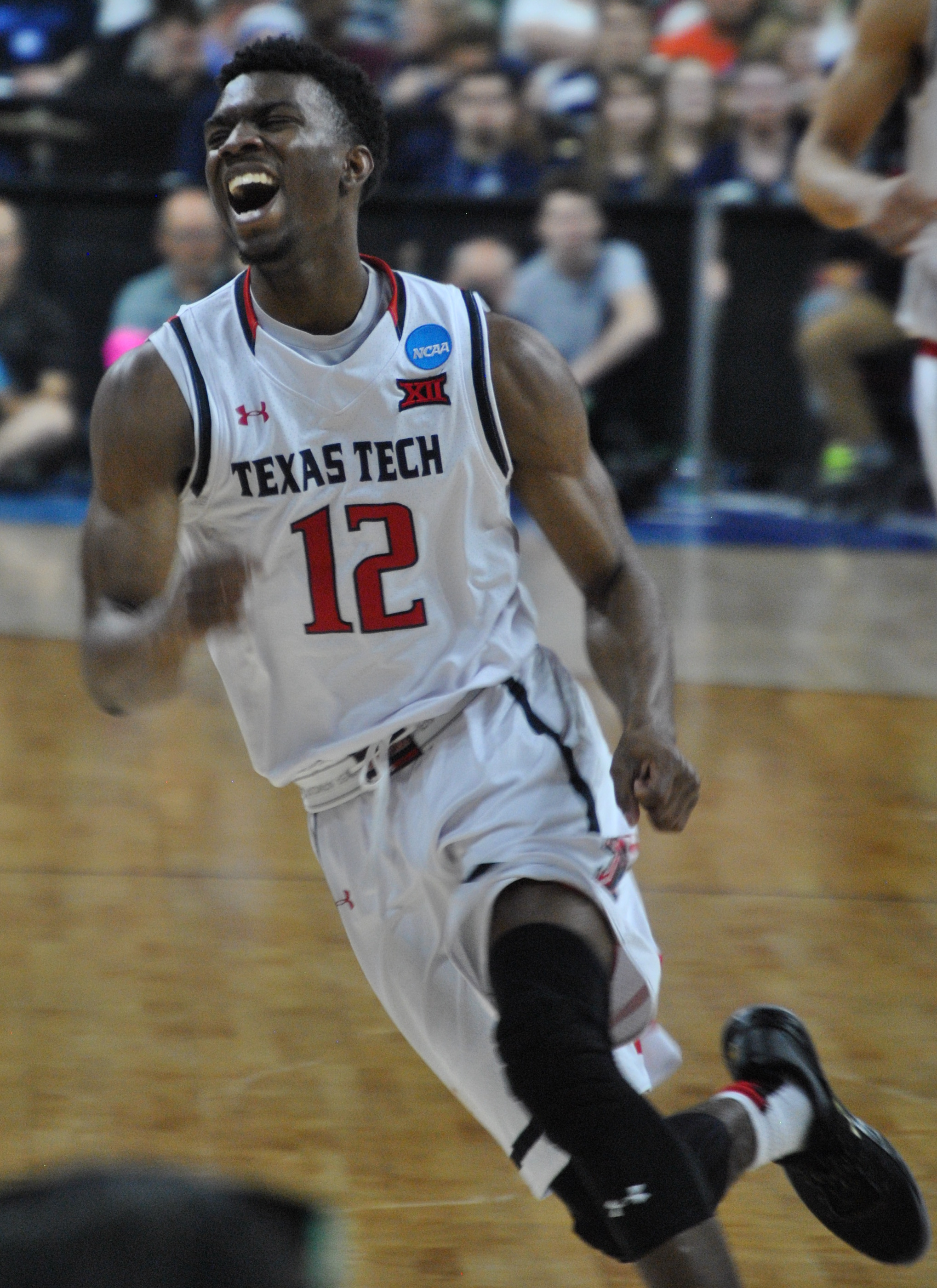
Evans with Texas Tech in 2016

A 6’3” point guard, after Evans starred at Lloyd V. Berkner High School in Richardson, Texas, he committed to Texas Tech to play for coach Tubby Smith. When Smith left Texas Tech to become head coach at Memphis, Evans stayed to play for Chris Beard, Smith's replacement.

As a junior, Evans averaged 15.4 points (7th in the Big 12) and 3 assists a game, was second in free throw percentage (.849) and ninth in field goal percentage (.464) in the Big 12, and was named third-team All-Big 12 Conference for the 2016–17 season.

As a senior in 2017–18, Evans emerged as the primary scoring option for the Red Raiders and led them to a top ten ranking during the season. He scored one of the most memorable baskets of the Red Raiders’ season as he hit a game-winner against in-State rival Texas on February in a game where he scored a career-high 38 points. Evans was named to the late-season watch lists for the Wooden Award and the Bob Cousy Award. For the season, he was averaged 17.6 points per game (2nd in the Big 12), and was 6th in field goal percentage (.471) and 7th in free throw percentage (.817).

== Professional career ==
=== Grand Rapids Drive (2018–2019) ===
After going undrafted in the 2018 NBA draft, Evans signed a contract with the Golden State Warriors for their summer league team. He later signed a two-way contract with the Detroit Pistons. On January 15, 2019, Evans was waived by the Pistons, but was retained on the Drive roster.

=== Delaware Blue Coats (2019) ===
On January 22, 2019, Evans was traded to the Delaware Blue Coats along with the returning player rights to Chris Horton in exchange for the returning player rights to Shawn Long and Devondrick Walker.

=== Igokea (2019–2020) ===
On July 26, 2019, Evans signed a one-year contract for Igokea of the Adriatic League.

=== Hapoel Haifa (2020–2021) ===
In July 2020, he joined Hapoel Haifa of the Israel Basketball Premier League. In 2020–21 he was sixth in the Israel Basketball Premier League in points per game (18.7), fourth in assists per game (6.2), second in steals per game (2.0), and ninth in free throw percentage (85.5 per cent), while also leading the league in efficiency (25.7 PIR).

=== Maccabi Tel Aviv (2021–2022) ===
On July 6, 2021, Evans signed a one-year deal with Maccabi Tel Aviv of the Israeli Basketball Premier League and the EuroLeague, with an option for two additional years. On July 12, 2022, Evans officially parted ways with the Israeli club.

=== Žalgiris Kaunas (2022–2024) ===
On July 12, 2022, Evans signed a two-year contract with Žalgiris Kaunas of the Lithuanian Basketball League (LKL) and the EuroLeague. On December 23, 2022, Evans recorded a career-high 32 points, shooting 11-of-15 from the field, along with four rebounds, four assists and two steals for a 39 PIR in a 75–67 win over Bayern Munich. He was subsequently named EuroLeague Round 15 MVP. On January 5, 2023, in an 86-66 Euroleague win over Fenerbahce Istanbul, Evans suffered a torn Achilles tendon which sidelined him for the rest of the season. Evans returned on September 8, 2023, in a friendly against BC Lietkabelis, putting up four points and two assists in twenty minutes. On October 5, 2023, in his first EuroLeague game of the season, Evans scored a game-high 25 points, leading Žalgiris to an 82–79 win over Virtus Bologna.

On May 26, 2024, in the third game of the LKL semifinals against Lietkabelis, Evans suffered a patellar tendon rupture and was expected to be sidelined for six to eight months. In his absence, Žalgiris went on to lose the LKL Finals 3–1 to Rytas Vilnius, who won their first finals series against their rivals since 2010.

=== Olympiacos (2024–2026) ===
On July 6, 2024, Evans signed a three-year deal with Olympiacos of the Greek Basket League and the EuroLeague.

In April 2025, Evans left Olympiacos training camp in Madrid to return to the United States as his wife was about to give birth.

On November 12, 2025, Evans suffered a rupture of his left Achilles tendon in his first EuroLeague game since the 2023-2024 season. That was his only Olympiacos appearance in the EuroLeague since arriving from Zalgiris in the summer of 2024. On July 9, 2026, Olympiacos and Evans parted ways.

=== Return to Žalgiris (2026–present) ===
On August 7, 2026, Evans signed a 1+1 year deal with Žalgiris Kaunas of the Lietuvos krepšinio lyga (LKL) and the EuroLeague. On October 23, 2026, Žalgiris recalled Evans from his loan spell.

==== Loan to London Lions (2026) ====
Evans was immediately loaned to London Lions of the Super League Basketball (SLB) until the end of the 2026–27 season.

== Career statistics ==
Legend
GP	Games played	GS	Games started	MPG	Minutes per game
FG%	Field-goal percentage	3P%	3-point field-goal percentage	FT%	Free-throw percentage
RPG	Rebounds per game	APG	Assists per game	SPG	Steals per game
BPG	Blocks per game	PPG	Points per game	PIR	Performance index rating
**Bold**	Career high

=== EuroLeague ===
Year	Team	GP	GS	MPG	FG%	3P%	FT%	RPG	APG	SPG	BPG	PPG	PIR
2021–22	Maccabi	33	32	25.2	.442	.329	.879	2.5	3.5	**1.2**	**.2**	8.2	10.2
2022–23	Žalgiris	17	17	26.2	**.506**	**.458**	.813	**3.2**	3.7	1.0	**.2**	15.9	17.4
2023–24	Žalgiris	**34**	**34**	**27.4**	.481	.435	**.895**	2.8	**3.9**	**1.2**	.1	**17.3**	**18.3**
2025–26	Olympiacos	1	0	2.0	—	—	—	—	—	—	—	—	—
2026–27	Žalgiris	3	1	17.2	.250	.333	.750	2.0	3.3	—	—	5.3	5.3
Career		88	84	25.7	.471	.415	.868	2.7	3.6	1.1	.1	13.0	14.5

Correct as of November 10, 2026.

=== Domestic leagues ===
Year	Team	League	GP	MPG	FG%	3P%	FT%	RPG	APG	SPG	BPG	PPG
2018–19	(United States) Delaware Blue Coats	G League	24	23.8	.431	.315	.902	3.1	3.6	.7	.1	8.5
2018–19	(United States) Grand Rapids Drive	G League	21	31.9	.435	.429	.776	3.6	3.3	1.0	.1	14.5
2019–20	(Bosnia and Herzegovina) Igokea	Liga BiH	16	21.8	.492	.375	.900	3.2	3.1	1.2	.3	11.8
2019–20	(Bosnia and Herzegovina) Igokea	ABA	18	29.3	.406	.347	.794	2.4	2.8	1.6	.2	11.9
2020–21	(Israel) Hapoel Haifa	Ligat HaAl	31	31.9	.477	.370	.855	4.2	6.2	2.0	.2	18.7
2021–22	(Israel) Maccabi Tel Aviv	Ligat HaAl	31	25.6	.485	.412	.875	2.3	4.0	1.2	.4	11.5
2022–23	(Lithuania) Žalgiris	LKL	10	20.2	.429	.407	.859	1.8	4.4	1.4	.0	9.9
2023–24	(Lithuania) Žalgiris	LKL	32	19.4	.448	.353	.903	1.9	3.4	1.1	.2	11.3

=== College ===
Year	Team	GP	GS	MPG	FG%	3P%	FT%	RPG	APG	SPG	BPG	PPG
2014–15	Texas Tech	32	3	18.2	.369	.302	.716	2.0	1.4	.8	**.3**	5.8
2015–16	Texas Tech	32	31	25.1	.412	.375	.756	2.9	2.9	1.0	**.3**	8.7
2016–17	Texas Tech	31	30	**30.4**	.464	**.432**	**.849**	2.8	3.0	1.0	.2	15.4
2017–18	Texas Tech	**36**	**35**	29.5	**.471**	.320	.817	**3.0**	**3.2**	**1.1**	**.3**	**17.6**
Career		131	99	25.9	.444	.360	.797	2.7	2.6	1.0	.3	12.0

== Personal life ==
Evans is the son of Olympic high jumper Kenny Evans.
