= Tamir Blatt =

Israeli-American basketball player

Tamir Blatt תמיר בלאט
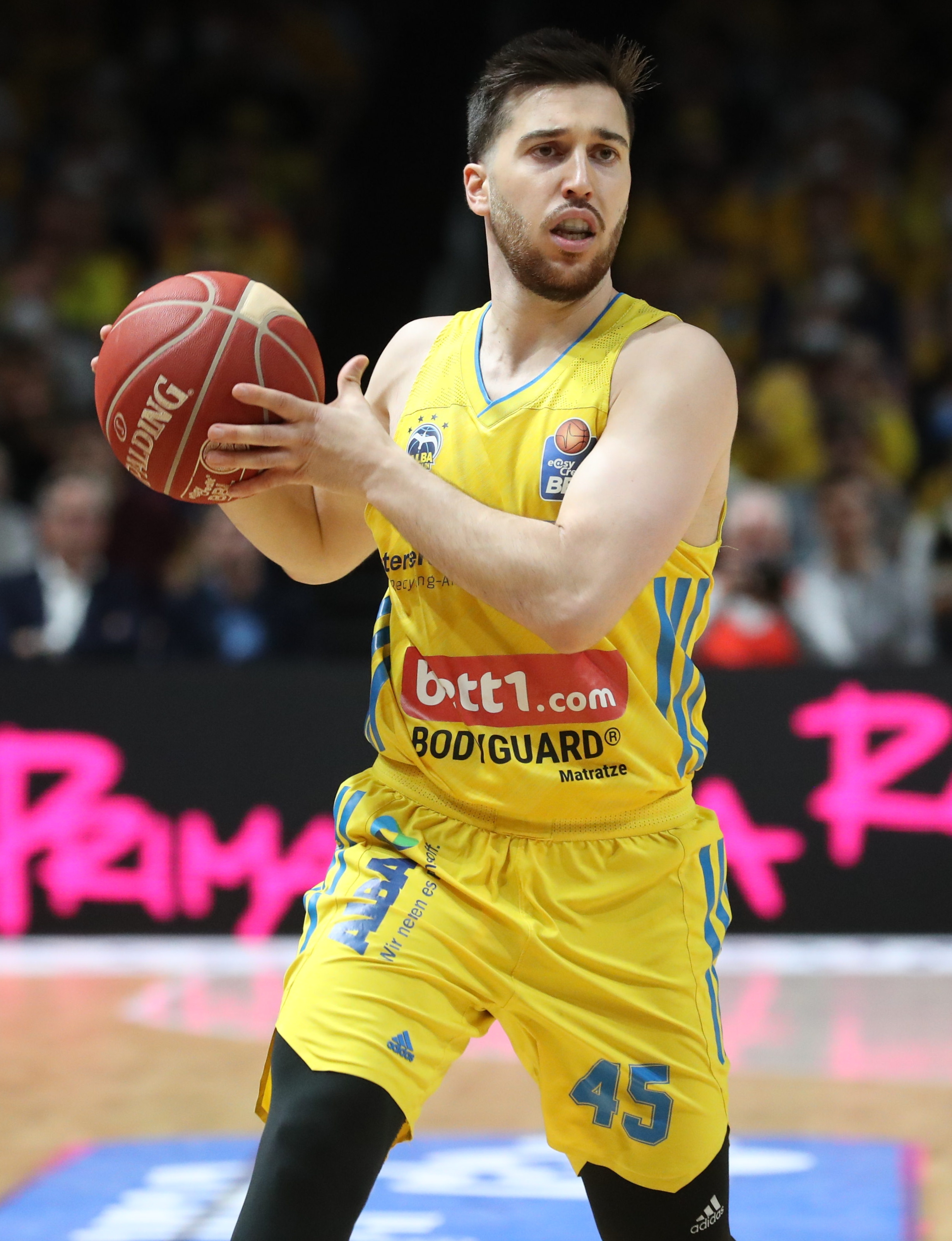
- Blatt with Alba Berlin in 2022

No. 45 – Hapoel Tel Aviv
- Position: Point guard
- League: Israeli Basketball Premier League; EuroLeague

Personal information
- Born: May 4, 1997 (age 29) Netanya, Israel
- Listed height: 1.83 m (6 ft 0 in)
- Listed weight: 82 kg (181 lb)

Career information
- NBA draft: 2019: undrafted
- Playing career: 2014–present

Career history
- 2014–2017: Hapoel Tel Aviv
- 2014–2015: →A.S. Ramat HaSharon
- 2017–2018: Hapoel Holon
- 2018–2021: Hapoel Jerusalem
- 2021–2023: Alba Berlin
- 2023–2026: Maccabi Tel Aviv
- 2026–present: Hapoel Tel Aviv

Career highlights
- 2× Israeli Basketball Premier League champion (2024, 2026); 5× Israeli Cup winner (2018–2020, 2025, 2026); EuroLeague free-throw percentage leader (2025); All-Israeli Basketball Premier League Second Team (2024); 2× Israeli League Cup winner (2019, 2024); German League champion (2022); German Cup winner (2022); Israeli Basketball Premier League assists leader (2021); FIBA Champions League Best Young Player (2019); 3× Israeli Basketball Premier League All-Star (2017–2019)
Medals
Representing Israel
Men's basketball
FIBA Europe Under-20
Silver medal – second place	2017 Greece	National Team

Tamir Blatt (Hebrew: תמיר בלאט; born May 4, 1997) is an Israeli-American professional basketball player for Hapoel Tel Aviv of the Israeli Basketball Premier League and the EuroLeague. He is also a member of the senior Israel national basketball team.

He was named FIBA Champions League Best Young Player in 2019. He is a three-time Israeli Basketball Premier League All Star, led the league in assists in 2021, and led the EuroLeague in free-throw percentage in 2025. He is the son of former basketball player and coach David Blatt.

== Early life ==
Blatt was born in Netanya, Israel. He is the son of former basketball player and coach David Blatt. He played for Hapoel Lev Hasharon youth team, and led his team to win the state cup in 2012, alongside his teammate Roi Huber. In July 2012, Blatt joined the Wingate Institute youth academy.

== Professional career ==
=== Hapoel Tel Aviv (2014–2017) ===
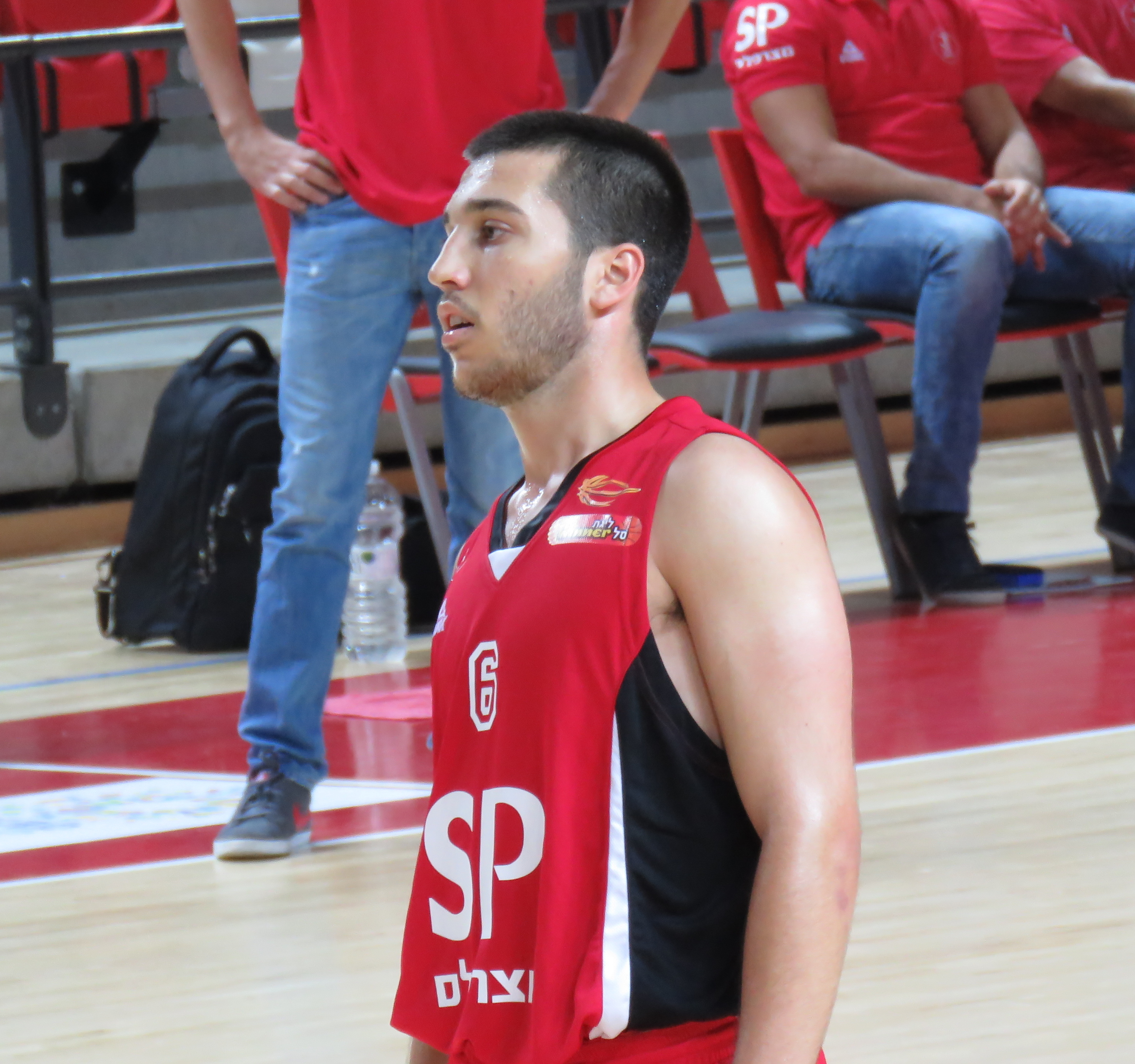
Blatt in 2015

On August 27, 2014, Blatt started his professional career with Hapoel Tel Aviv, signing a four-year deal. In his first season with Hapoel in 2014–15, Blatt was loaned to A.S. Ramat HaSharon of the Israeli National League, where he averaged 9.7 points, 4.1 assists and 2.5 rebounds per game. Playing with Hapoel that season, at 17 years of age he only played 5.0 minutes per game, in 12 games off the bench. In 2015–16 with Hapoel, he averaged 13.5 minutes, 4.5 points, 1.8 assists, and 1.1 rebounds per game, shooting 41% from three-point range, in 38 games off the bench.

In his third season with Hapoel in 2016–17, at 19 years of age, Blatt had a breakthrough season averaging 23.5 minutes, 7.4 points, 5.4 assists (3rd in the league), and 2.2 rebounds per game in 33 games (15 starts), while shooting 42% from three-point range (6th) and 80% from the free throw line, earning a spot in Hapoel's starting lineup. On April 18, 2017, Blatt participated in the 2017 Israeli Basketball Premier League All-Star Game.

=== Hapoel Holon (2017–2018) ===
On July 13, 2017, Blatt signed a two-year contract with Hapoel Holon. On November 12, 2017, Blatt recorded a career-high 22 points, shooting 6-of-10 from three-point range, along with five rebounds and five assists in a 104–74 blowout win over Maccabi Rishon LeZion. On December 5, 2017, Blatt recorded a double-double with a career-high 13 assists and 12 points in a 94–90 win over Baskets Oldenburg. He was named to the Champions League Team of the Week.

Blatt helped Holon win the 2018 Israeli State Cup, and reach the 2018 Israeli Basketball Premier League Final. In 54 games (19 starts) during the 2017–18 season (played in the Israeli Basketball Premier League and the Champions League), he averaged 34.4 minutes, 6.3 points, 4.6 assists (7th in the Israeli Basketball Premier League ), and 1.6 rebounds per game.

=== Hapoel Jerusalem (2018–2021) ===
On July 4, 2018, Blatt signed a two-year deal with Hapoel Jerusalem, joining his former head coach Oded Kattash. On December 26, Blatt recorded a season-high 21 points, shooting 6-of-13 from the field in a 94–74 win over his former team Hapoel Holon.

In 2018–19 he averaged 24.9 minutes, 10.0 points, 5.9 assists (5th in the Israeli Basketball Premier League), and 2.2 rebounds per game while shooting 40% from three-point range, over 53 games (49 starts). On May 4, 2019, Blatt was named the Champions League Best Young Player.

In 2019–20 Blatt averaged 22.8 minutes, 8.7 points, 5.4 assists (5th in the Israeli Basketball Premier League), and 1.9 rebounds per game, over 43 games (33 starts). On August 7, 2020, he re-signed with Hapoel Jerusalem.

In 2020–21 he led the Israeli Basketball Premier League in assists per game (7.9), and ranked fifth in the Basketball Champions League (6.5) . Blatt also averaged 27.9 minutes, 11.2 points, and 2.4 rebounds per game as he shot 80% from the free throw line, over 41 games (40 starts).

=== Alba Berlin (2021–2023) ===
Blatt in 2022

On July 8, 2021, he signed with Alba Berlin of the German Basketball Bundesliga (BBL). He led the BBL in assists-per-48 minutes, with 13.1 (while only playing 18.3 minutes per game in 40 games; 6 starts), and shot 85% from the free throw line. In 2021–22, playing for the team across all leagues, including the EuroLeague and the German Cup, he averaged 16.7 minutes, 6.3 points, 4.3 assists, and 1.6 rebounds per game in 74 games (11 starts).

In 2022–23, playing for the team across all leagues Blatt averaged 19.1 minutes, 7.3 points, 4.9 assists (he was 6th in the German BBL), and 1.5 rebounds per game, shooting 84% from the free throw line, in 56 games (37 starts).

=== Maccabi Tel Aviv (2023–2026) ===
On July 17, 2023, Blatt signed a two-year deal with Israeli powerhouse Maccabi Tel Aviv, reuniting with his former head coach Oded Kattash. In 2023–24 he averaged 20.2 minutes, 7.6 points, 5.6 assists (leading the Israeli Basketball Premier League with 0.29 assists per minute), and 1.8 rebounds per game, over 72 games (10 starts).

In October 2024, Blatt was named EuroLeague opening Round MVP. He had a double-double for 21 points and 12 assists. In October 2024, Blatt sustained a hamstring injury in a game and was expected to miss about three weeks of play. In 2024–25 he averaged 22.8 minutes, 8.9 points, 6.5 assists (as he was 2nd in the EuroLeague with an average of 6.7 assists, and 3rd in the Israeli Basketball Premier League), and 2.1 rebounds per game, while shooting 90% from the free throw line (95% in the EuroLeague, leading the league), over 56 games (27 starts).

In 2025–26 Blatt averaged 19.0 minutes, 8.0 points, 5.1 assists (8th in the EuroLeague, with 5.2), and 1.7 rebounds per game, while shooting 85% from the free throw line, over 66 games (23 starts).

On July 6, 2026, Blatt's contract with the team ended and he would leave the team after three seasons.

=== Return to Hapoel Tel Aviv (2026–present) ===
On August 3, 2026, Blatt signed a three-year deal with Hapoel Tel Aviv of the Israeli Basketball Premier League and the EuroLeague.

== National team career ==
=== Israeli junior national team ===
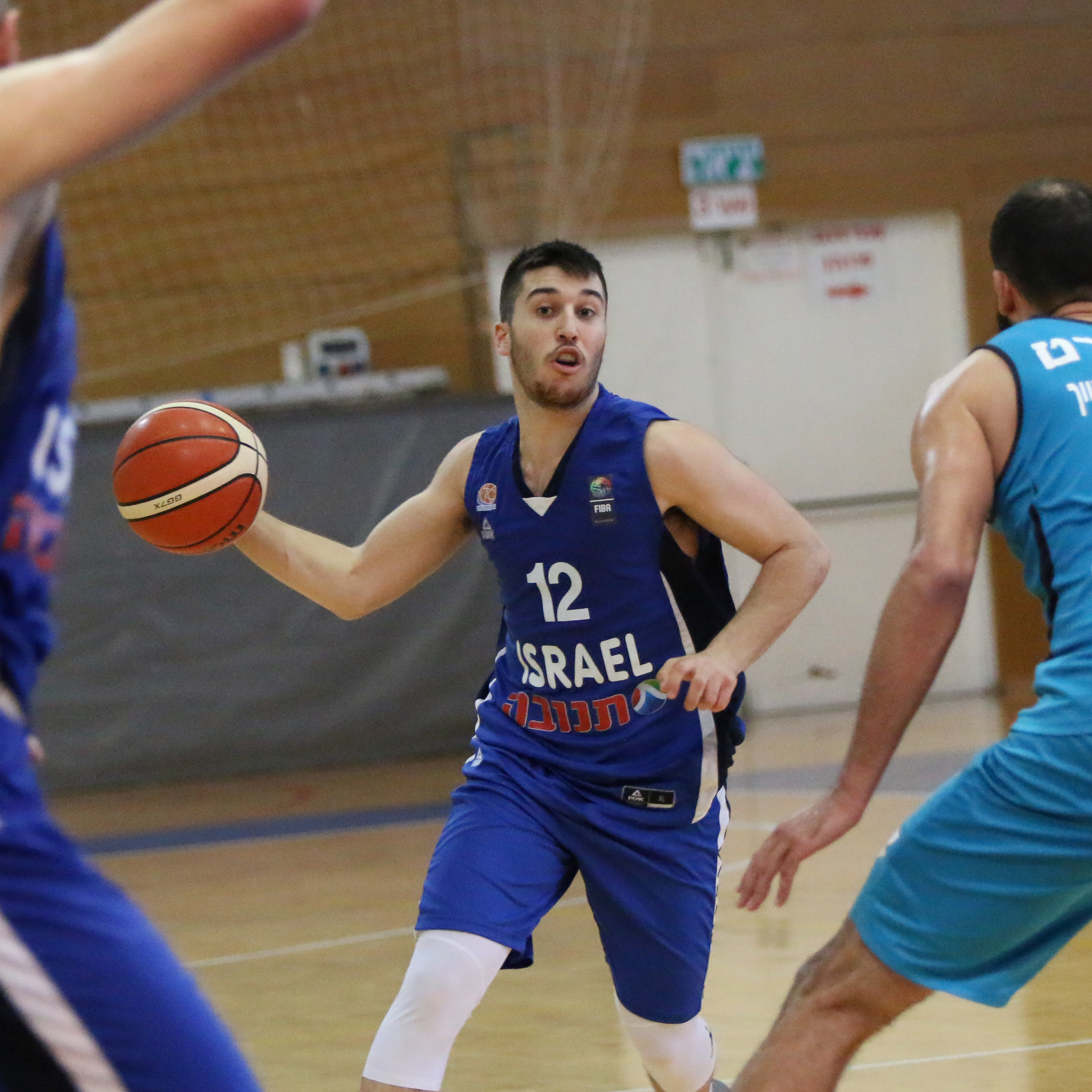
Blatt with the Israeli U-20 team in March 2017

Blatt was a member of the U–16, U–18, and U–20 Israel national teams.

In 2013, at 15 years old, Blatt played in the U16 Euro Championship B, and over 8 games averaged 12.3 points, 7.5 assists, 5.4 rebounds, and 3.5 steals per game.

In 2014, at 16 years old, he played in the U18 Euro Championship B, and over 9 games averaged 8.7 points, 6.8 assists, 5.4 rebounds, and 2.1 steals per game.

In July 2015, at 17 years old Blatt helped the Israeli under–18 national team to reach the 2015 FIBA Europe Under–18 Championship Division B Final, where they eventually lost to Sweden in the finals and earned a silver medal. Over 9 games Blatt averaged 9.4 points, 4.8 assists, 4.1 rebounds, and 1.8 steals per game. He was named to the All-Tournament Team.

On September 18, 2015, Blatt competed in the FIBA European U–18 All-Star Game in France, recording six points and six assists.

In 2016, at 18 years old, he played in the U20 Euro Championship A, and over 7 games averaged 12.7 points, 6.3 assists, and 3.9 rebounds per game, while shooting 40% from three-point range.

In July 2017, at 19 years of age, Blatt led the Israeli under-20 national team to the 2017 FIBA Europe Under-20 Championship Final, where they lost to Greece. Blatt set the FIBA U20 all-time record in assists per game with 10.1, and also averaged 16.0 points, 4.6 rebounds, and 1.3 steals per game, while shooting 46% from the field and 43% from three-point range. Blatt earned a spot on the All-Tournament Team.

=== Israeli senior national team ===
Blatt is a member of the senior Israel national basketball team. On November 24, 2017, he made his first appearance for the senior team while Kattash was the coach at the 2019 FIBA Basketball World Cup qualification match against Estonia, recording nine points and three assists off the bench. In that tournament, at 19 years old, over 9 games he averaged 8.9 points, 5.3 assists, 1.3 rebounds, and 1.2 steals per game, while shooting 42% from three-point range and 83% from the free throw line.

In 2020, at the EuroBasket Qualifiers, over 6 games Blatt averaged 5.4 points, 8.0 assists, 1.8 rebounds, and 1.3 steals per game, while shooting 80% from the free throw line.

In 2021, at the European World Cup Qualifiers, over 5 games he averaged 8.8 points, 4.4 assists, 2.2 rebounds, and 1.0 steals per game, while shooting 41% from three-point range.

In 2022, at the EuroBasket, over 5 games Blatt averaged 5.8 points, 4.2 assists, and 1.6 rebounds per game, while shooting 41% from three-point range.

In 2025, at the European World Cup Qualifier, over 3 games he averaged 6.7 points, 3.0 assists, and 2.3 rebounds per game.

== Personal life ==
Blatt's father, David Blatt, is a former professional basketball player and head coach. Tamir said of his father in 2016: "I talk to him everyday. We are very close.... I just love learning from him every single day. With him it’s tough not to talk basketball. He’s a great coach."

As a coach, Tamir's father David Blatt has been named Israeli Basketball Premier League Coach of the Year four times, as well as EuroLeague Coach of the Year and Russian League Coach of the Year, and has led his teams to be Israeli Super League champion five times, EuroLeague champion, FIBA EuroChallenge champion, FIBA EuroBasket champion, EuroCup champion, ABA League champion, and LBA champion. He also coached the Cleveland Cavaliers in the NBA for two years, during which time he was twice named NBA coach of the month.

Tamir's cousin, Golan Gutt, is a current professional basketball shooting guard for Maccabi Rishon LeZion .

== Career statistics ==
Legend
GP	Games played	GS	Games started	MPG	Minutes per game
FG%	Field-goal percentage	3P%	3-point field-goal percentage	FT%	Free-throw percentage
RPG	Rebounds per game	APG	Assists per game	SPG	Steals per game
BPG	Blocks per game	PPG	Points per game	PIR	Performance index rating
**Bold**	Career high

=== EuroLeague ===
Year	Team	GP	GS	MPG	FG%	3P%	FT%	RPG	APG	SPG	BPG	PPG	PIR
2021–22	Alba Berlin	30	3	15.0	.381	.360	**1.000**	1.3	3.5	.3	—	5.0	6.3
2022–23	Alba Berlin	30	**14**	**19.9**	.341	.357	.895	1.2	4.6	.3	—	**7.8**	7.2
2023–24	Maccabi Tel Aviv	**38**	0	18.9	**.414**	**.393**	.875	**1.5**	**4.8**	**.4**	—	7.0	**7.8**
Career		98	17	18.0	.379	.372	.913	1.3	4.3	.4	—	6.7	7.1

=== Basketball Champions League ===
Year	Team	GP	GS	MPG	FG%	3P%	FT%	RPG	APG	SPG	BPG	PPG
2017–18	Hapoel Holon	14	6	27.1	.378	.321	.850	1.4	5.3	**1.1**	—	6.4
2018–19	Hapoel Jerusalem	**17**	**16**	24.8	**.400**	**.408**	**.875**	**2.6**	**7.0**	**1.1**	—	**10.2**
2019–20	Hapoel Jerusalem	16	10	21.7	.324	.284	.857	1.9	4.6	.6	.1	6.6
2020–21	Hapoel Jerusalem	6	5	**27.3**	.378	.385	.571	1.5	6.5	.5	**.2**	8.8
Career		53	37	24.7	.371	.349	.831	2.0	5.8	.9	.0	7.9

=== Domestic leagues ===
Year	Team	League	GP	MPG	FG%	3P%	FT%	RPG	APG	SPG	BPG	PPG
2014–15	(Israel) Ramat HaSharon	Liga Leumit	26	25.8	.372	.383	.703	2.3	4.1	.7	—	9.9
2014–15	(Israel) Hapoel Tel Aviv	Israeli Basketball Premier League	12	5.0	.154	.125	.000	.6	.8	.2	—	0.4
2015–16	(Israel) Hapoel Tel Aviv	Israeli Basketball Premier League	38	13.5	.390	.413	.769	1.1	1.8	.5	—	4.5
2016–17	(Israel) Hapoel Tel Aviv	Israeli Basketball Premier League	33	25.5	.362	.423	.800	2.2	5.4	.9	.0	7.4
2017–18	(Israel) Hapoel Holon	Israeli Basketball Premier League	39	22.1	.388	.397	.756	1.7	4.4	.8	—	6.2
2018–19	(Israel) Hapoel Jerusalem	Israeli Basketball Premier League	36	25.0	.391	.393	.667	1.6	5.3	.8	—	9.9
2019–20	(Israel) Hapoel Jerusalem	Israeli Basketball Premier League	27	23.5	.428	.429	.741	1.9	5.8	.7	—	9.9
2020–21	(Israel) Hapoel Jerusalem	Israeli Basketball Premier League	31	28.5	.384	.380	.813	2.6	7.9	.9	.0	12.2
2020–21	(Israel) Hapoel Jerusalem	BIBL	4	24.5	.357	.286	1.000	1.5	4.7	.7	—	7.7
2021–22	(Germany) Alba Berlin	BBL	40	18.3	.357	.370	.852	1.9	5.0	.4	—	7.4
2022–23	(Germany) Alba Berlin	BBL	23	17.5	.301	.327	.774	1.6	5.0	.5	—	6.2
2023–24	(Israel) Maccabi Tel Aviv	Israeli Basketball Premier League	32	21.7	.357	.326	.833	2.1	6.3	.6	—	8.5
