= Stefanos Dedas =

Greek professional basketball head coach

Hapoel Tel Aviv
- Position: Assistant coach
- League: Israeli Premier League; EuroCup

Personal information
- Born: May 10, 1982 (age 44) Kilkis, Greece
- Coaching career: 2001–present

Career history

Coaching
- 2001–2004: PAOK (assistant)
- 2004: MENT (assistant)
- 2004–2005: MENT
- 2005–2006: Iraklis (assistant)
- 2006–2007: Rethymno (assistant)
- 2007–2009: OFI Crete
- 2009: Slovenia (assistant)
- 2009–2011: Aris (assistant)
- 2011–2013: Spartak Saint Petersburg (assistant)
- 2013–2015: Gaziantep (assistant)
- 2014–2016: Slovenia (assistant)
- 2015–2017: Gaziantep
- 2017–2019: Bahçeşehir Koleji
- 2019–2021: Hapoel Holon
- 2021–2022: AEK Athens
- 2022: CSKA Moscow (assistant)
- 2022–2023: Fenerbahçe (assistant)
- 2024: Hapoel Tel Aviv
- 2024–present: Hapoel Tel Aviv (assistant)

Career highlights
- As head coach: Israeli League Coach of the Year (2021); Balkan League winner (2021); As assistant coach: EuroCup champion (2025)

Stefanos Dedas (Greek: Στέφανος Δέδας; born May 10, 1982) is a Greek (from Vafiochori, Kilkis) professional basketball coach who is currently an assistant coach for the Hapoel Tel Aviv of the Israeli Premier League and the EuroLeague.

== Coaching career ==
=== Clubs ===
Dedas began his basketball coaching career, being only 19 years old, with PAOK, working there from 2001 to 2004, as an assistant. In 2004, he became the assistant coach of MENT, and later that season, he became the head coach of the club.

The next season, he became the assistant coach of Jure Zdovc, at Iraklis. From 2007 to 2009, he was the head coach of OFI Crete. He was also assistant coach of the Greek club Aris, and the Russian club Spartak Saint Petersburg, from 2009 to 2011, and from 2011 to 2013 respectively.

In 2013, he again became an assistant coach of Jure Zdovc, this time with Gaziantep Basketbol. After the departure of Zdovc to AEK Athens, in 2015, he became the head coach of the club.

On December 22, 2019, Dedas was named the head coach for Hapoel Holon of the Israeli Premier League.

After two successful years with Holon, Dedas returned to Greece and signed a two-year deal with AEK Athens of the Greek League.

=== Slovenian national team ===
In 2009, Dedas was named the assistant coach of the senior Slovenian national basketball team. Slovenia took the 4th place at the FIBA Eurobasket 2009. In 2014, Dedas returned to work with the Slovenian national team, again as an assistant coach of Jure Zdovc.

== Personal life ==
Dedas is the younger brother of Georgios Dedas, who is a former professional basketball player, and whom also works as a basketball coach.
