= Coty Clarke =

American professional basketball

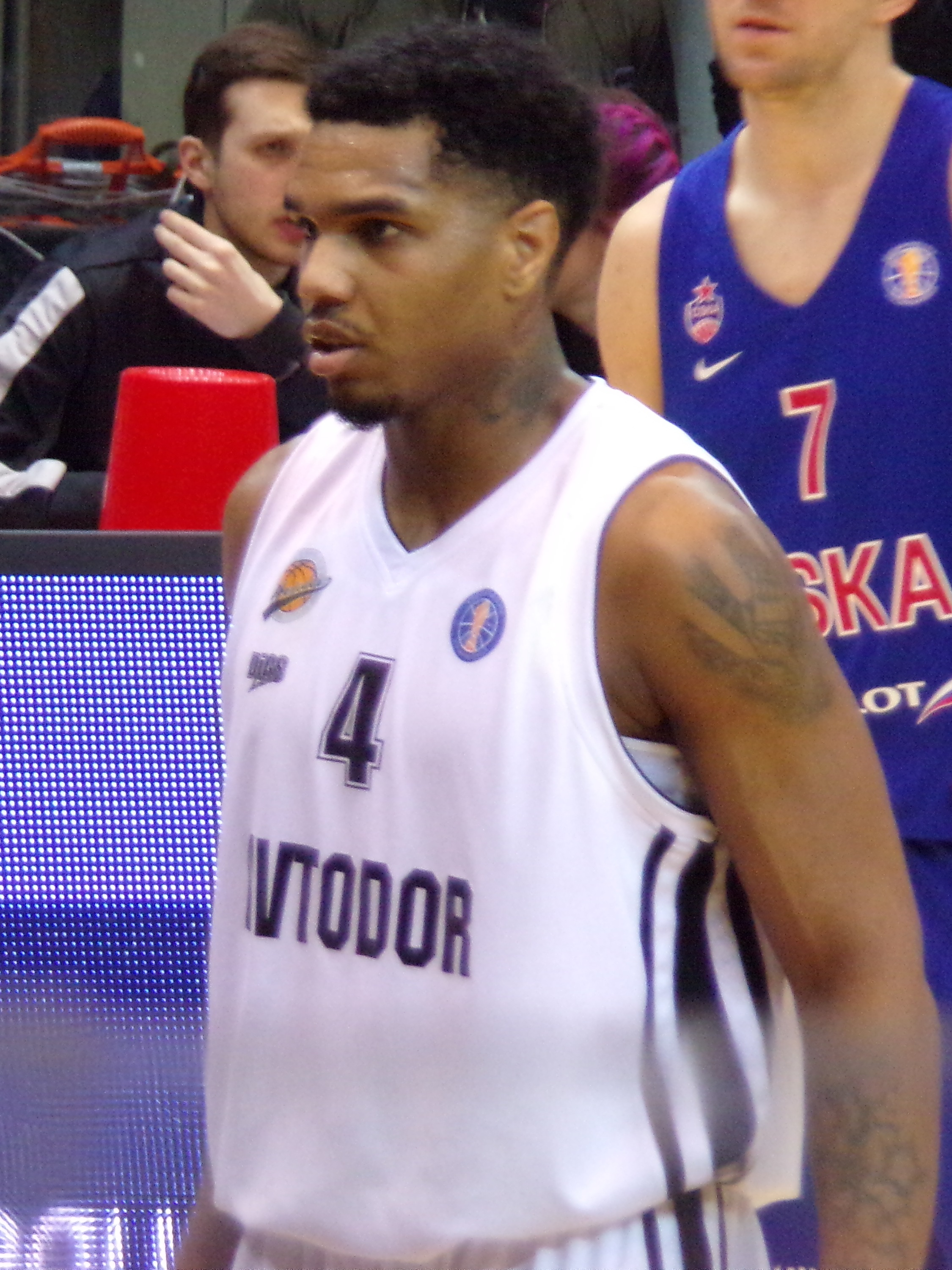
- Clarke playing for Avtodor Saratov

Free agent
- Position: Power forward

Personal information
- Born: July 4, 1992 (age 34) Antioch, Tennessee, U.S.
- Listed height: 6 ft 7 in (2.01 m)
- Listed weight: 237 lb (108 kg)

Career information
- High school: Pinson Valley (Pinson, Alabama)
- College: Lawson State CC (2010–2012); Arkansas (2012–2014)
- NBA draft: 2014: undrafted
- Playing career: 2014–present

Career history
- 2014–2015: Hapoel Kazrin/Galil Elyon
- 2015–2016: Maine Red Claws
- 2016: Boston Celtics
- 2016: →Maine Red Claws
- 2016: Capitanes de Arecibo
- 2016–2017: UNICS
- 2017: Capitanes de Arecibo
- 2017–2018: Avtodor Saratov
- 2018–2019: Budućnost VOLI
- 2019–2020: BC Astana
- 2020: Piratas de Quebradillas
- 2020–2021: Bnei Herzliya
- 2021–2023: Nagoya Diamond Dolphins
- 2023–2024: San-en NeoPhoenix
- 2024–2026: Shimane Susanoo Magic
- 2026-2026: Caimito, Minao

Career highlights
- Montenegrin League champion (2019); Montenegrin Cup winner (2019); All-VTB United League First Team (2018); Puerto Rican League champion (2016); All-NBA D-League Second Team (2016)
- Stats at NBA.com
- Stats at Basketball Reference

Coty Clarke (born July 4, 1992) is an American professional basketball player who last played for Shimane Susanoo Magic of the B.League. He played college basketball for Lawson State CC and Arkansas, and has since played in multiple professional leagues, including one season in the NBA with the Boston Celtics.

== College career ==
After attending Pinson Valley High School, Clarke began his college career at Lawson State CC where he averaged 12.8 points and 12.1 rebounds per game. After transferring to Arkansas as a junior, Clarke averaged during 8.6 points and 5.5 rebounds in 64 games including 43 starts in two years becoming just the fifth player in program history to accumulate 500 points, 300 rebounds, 100 assists and 100 steals over a two-year span. As a senior, he averaged 9.4 points and 5.6 rebounds in 22.3 minutes per game.

== Professional career ==
=== 2014–15 season ===
After going undrafted on the 2014 NBA draft, on August 19, 2014, Clarke signed a one-year contract with Hapoel Kazrin/Galil Elyon of the Liga Leumit, the second tier league in Israel. In a year with the Israeli outfit, Clarke nearly averaged a double-double, producing 19 points, 9.4 rebounds, 3.6 assists and 1.5 steals per game, leading the team to the semifinals.

=== 2015–16 season ===
On September 25, 2015, Clarke signed with the Boston Celtics. However, he was later waived by the team on October 20 after appearing in one preseason game. On October 31, he was acquired by the Maine Red Claws of the NBA Development League as an affiliate player of the Celtics. On November 12, he made his debut for the Red Claws in a 105–103 loss to the Westchester Knicks, recording five points, one rebound and one steal in 18 minutes.

On March 7, 2016, Clarke signed to a 10-day contract with the Celtics. On March 10, he was assigned back down to the Red Claws, earning a recall the next day. He made his NBA debut on March 15, recording three points and one rebound in three minutes off the bench in the Celtics' 103–98 loss to the Indiana Pacers. On March 18, he signed a second 10-day contract with the Celtics. On March 23, he was reassigned to Maine, earning a recall three days later. He was not retained by the Celtics following the expiration of his second 10-day contract. On March 29, he was reacquired by the Red Claws. At the season's end, he was named to the All-NBA D-League Second Team.

On April 30, 2016, Clarke signed with the Capitanes de Arecibo of the Puerto Rican League. On May 2, he made his debut for the Capitanes in a 102–65 win over the Indios de Mayagüez, recording 14 points, four rebounds, eight assists and three blocks in 33 minutes.

=== 2016–17 season ===
On July 23, 2016, Clarke signed with Russian club UNICS Kazan for the 2016–17 season. On May 27, 2017, he re-joined the Capitanes de Arecibo for the rest of the 2017 BSN season.

=== 2017–18 season ===
On June 20, 2017, Clarke signed with Russian club Avtodor Saratov for the 2017–18 season.

=== 2018–19 season ===
On May 30, 2018, he signed with Montenegrin basketball club Budućnost VOLI.

=== 2019–20 season ===
On September 9, 2019, it was reported that Clarke was added to roster of BC Astana. He parted ways from the team on January 6, 2020, after averaging 12.9 points, 5.1 rebounds and 2.6 assists per game. On January 22, 2020, the Piratas de Quebradillas of the Puerto Rican league was reported to have signed Clarke.

=== 2020–21 season ===
On July 23, 2020, he has signed with Bnei Herzliya of the Israeli Basketball Premier League.

== Career statistics ==
Legend
GP	Games played	GS	Games started	MPG	Minutes per game
FG%	Field goal percentage	3P%	3-point field goal percentage	FT%	Free throw percentage
RPG	Rebounds per game	APG	Assists per game	SPG	Steals per game
BPG	Blocks per game	PPG	Points per game	**Bold**	Career high

=== NBA ===
==== Regular season ====
Year	Team	GP	GS	MPG	FG%	3P%	FT%	RPG	APG	SPG	BPG	PPG
2015–16	Boston	3	0	2.0	.500	1.000	–	.3	.0	.0	.0	2.0
