= Yiftach Ziv =

Israeli basketball player (born 1995)

Yiftach Ziv יפתח זיו
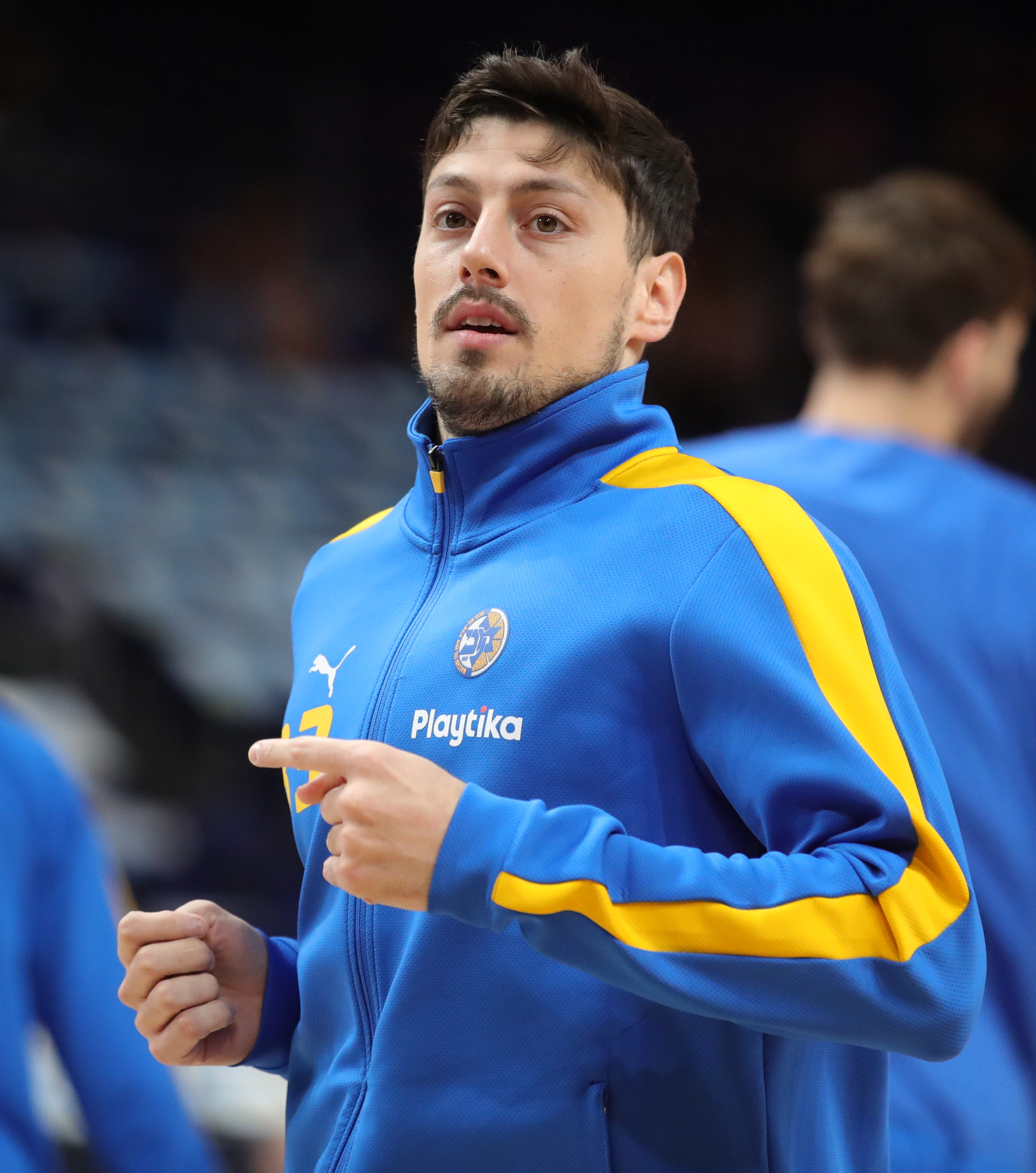
- Ziv with Maccabi Tel Aviv in 2022

No. 99 – Maccabi Rishon LeZion
- Position: Point guard
- League: Israeli Basketball Premier League

Personal information
- Born: July 9, 1995 (age 31) Haifa, Israel
- Listed height: 1.91 m (6 ft 3 in)
- Listed weight: 88 kg (194 lb)

Career information
- NBA draft: 2017: undrafted
- Playing career: 2012–present

Career history
- 2013–2014: Ironi Kiryat Ata
- 2014: Hapoel Kiryat Tiv'on
- 2014–2015: Maccabi Haifa
- 2015: →Elitzur Ramle
- 2015–2016: Bnei Herzliya
- 2016–2017: Maccabi Ashdod
- 2017–2019: Ironi Nahariya
- 2019–2021: Hapoel Gilboa Galil
- 2021–2023: Maccabi Tel Aviv
- 2023: CB Granada
- 2023–2024: Saint-Quentin
- 2024–2025: Hapoel Holon
- 2025–2026: Hapoel Tel Aviv
- 2026–present: Maccabi Rishon LeZion

Career highlights
- 3× Israeli League All-Star (2017–2019)

Yiftach Ziv (Hebrew: יפתח זיו; born July 9, 1995) is an Israeli professional basketball player for Maccabi Rishon LeZion of the Israeli Basketball Premier League. Standing at 1.91 m (6 ft 3 in), he plays at the point guard position.

== Early life ==
Ziv was born in Haifa, Israel, and began playing basketball for the youth team of Maccabi Haifa. In his last season with Haifa's youth team, Ziv averaged 20 points, 8 assists, 8 rebounds, and 4 steals per game. Ziv led Haifa to the Youth League Semifinals and was named the Youth League MVP.

== Professional career ==
=== Early career (2013–2015) ===
On September 10, 2013, Ziv started his professional career with Ironi Kiryat Ata, signing a two-year contract. Ziv played 9 games with the team, but didn't fit in with the Liga Leumit team and was released by request. Few days following his release, Ziv signed with another Liga Leumit club, Hapoel Kiryat Tiv'on, where he completed 2013–14 season with 5.6 points, 2.7 rebounds, 2.1 assists and 1.4 steals per game.

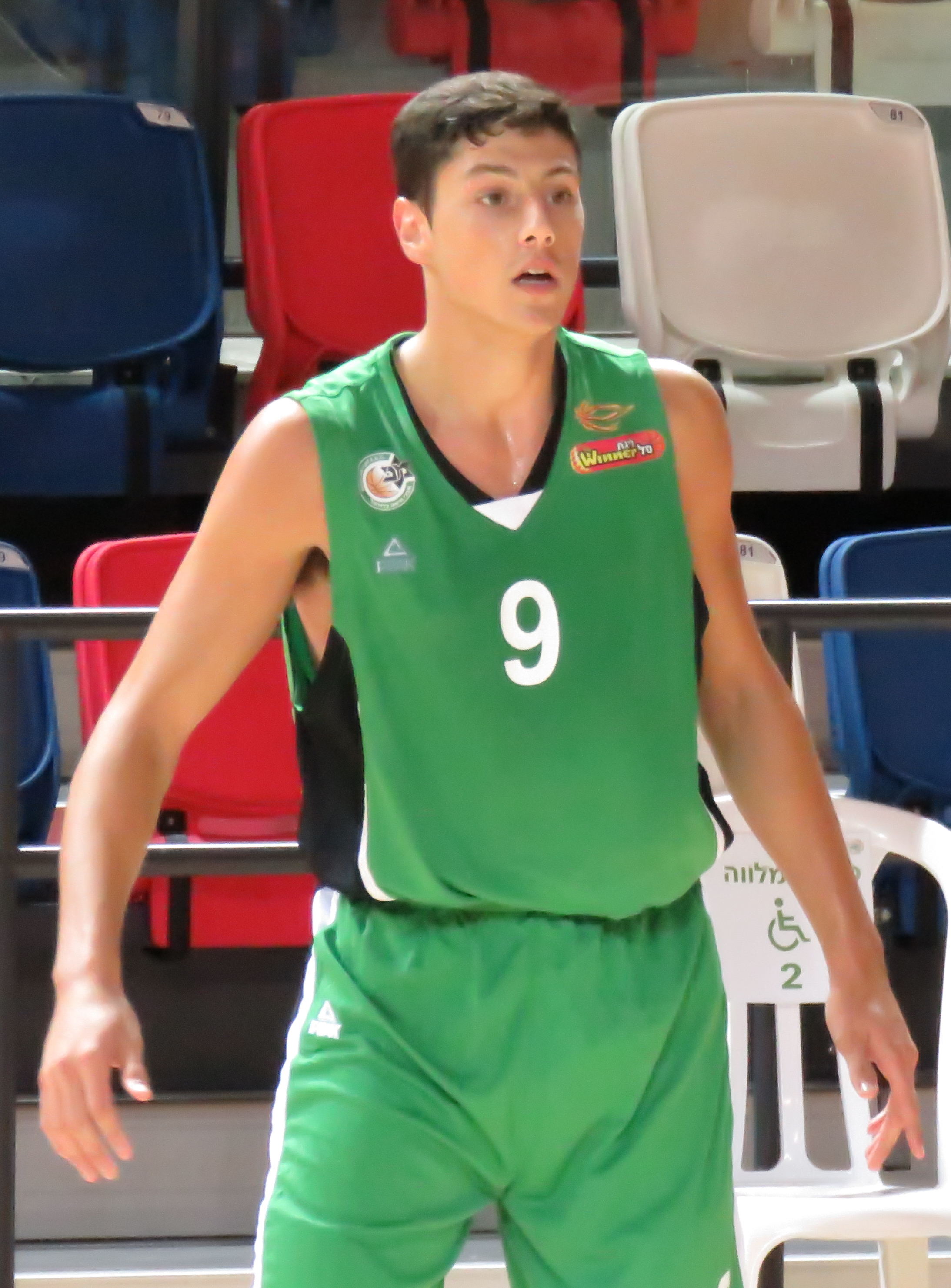
Ziv with Maccabi Haifa in 2015

On September 9, 2014, Ziv returned to his former club Maccabi Haifa and signed a one-year contract. Ziv didn't get a lot of chances and played only 3.3 minutes per game. In January 2015, Ziv was loaned to Elitzur Ramle in order to gain additional experience. In his debut, Ziv recorded 15 points, took 5 rebounds and gave 5 assists in 32 minutes. He finished the season in Elitzur Ramle averaging 10.6 points, 1.0 rebounds and 0.7 assists per game.

=== Bnei Herzliya (2015–2016) ===
On December 22, 2015, Ziv parted ways with Maccabi Haifa and joined Bnei Herzliya for the rest of the season. On April 16, 2016, Ziv recorded a then career-high 17 points, along with five assists and five steals in an 88–79 win over his former team Maccabi Haifa. He was subsequently named Israeli League Round 28 MVP. Ziv helped Herzliya to reach the 2016 Israeli League Playoffs as the seventh seed, but they eventually lost to Maccabi Tel Aviv in the Quarterfinals.

=== Maccabi Ashdod (2016–2017) ===
On July 5, 2016, Ziv signed a one-year deal with Maccabi Ashdod under head coach Meir Tapiro. On October 17, 2016, Ziv recorded a career-high 23 points, shooting 5-of-7 from 3-point range, along with three assists and four steals in a 77–75 win over Hapoel Gilboa Galil. Ziv made a breakthrough season with Ashdod averaging 7.9 points, 3.5 rebounds and 3.9 assists in 24.9 minutes per game.

=== Ironi Nahariya (2017–2019) ===
On July 21, 2017, Ziv signed on a one-year contract with Ironi Nahariya as a replacement for Niv Berkowitz. On March 2, 2018, Ziv participated in the Israeli League All-Star Game. On March 25, 2018, Ziv tied his career-high 23 points, shooting 8-of-14 from the field, along with five rebounds, three assists and three steals in an 86–95 loss to Maccabi Tel Aviv.

On July 9, 2018, Ziv signed a one-year contract extension with Nahariya. In 33 games played during the 2018–19 season, he averaged 10.7 points, 4.4 rebounds, 4.0 assists and 1.6 steals per game.

=== Hapoel Gilboa Galil (2019–2021) ===
On August 14, 2019, Ziv signed with Hapoel Gilboa Galil for the 2019–20 season. In 2020-21 he was third in the Israel Basketball Premier League in steals per game (2.0).

=== Maccabi Tel Aviv (2021–2023) ===
On July 4, 2021, Ziv signed a three-year (2+1) deal with Maccabi Tel Aviv.

=== Granada (2023) ===
On July 11, 2023, Ziv moved to Spanish club Fundación CB Granada, his first team outside of Israel.

=== Saint Quentin (2023–2024) ===
On December 26, 2023, he signed with Saint-Quentin Basket-Ball of the LNB Pro A.

=== Hapoel Holon (2024–2025) ===
During summer of 2024, he signed with Hapoel Holon of the Israeli Basketball Premier League.

== National team career ==
Ziv is a member of the Israel national basketball team. On September 13, 2018, he made his first appearance for the Israeli team in an 80–85 loss against Georgia.

Ziv was also a member of the Israeli Under-18 and Under-20 national teams and participated at the 2017 Summer Universiade.
