= 2020–21 Israeli Basketball State Cup =

Israeli Basketball State Cup
- Season: 2020–21
- Dates: 4 November 2020 – 27 May 2021
- Games played: 27
- Teams: 28

Finals
- Champions: Maccabi Tel Aviv
- Runners-up: Maccabi Rishon LeZion
- Finals MVP: (Israel) Yovel Zoosman

The 2020–21 Israeli Basketball State Cup was the 61st edition of the Israeli Basketball State Cup, organized by the Israel Basketball Association.

On 5 August, 2020, the Israel Basketball Association announced that the draw for the tournament would be held on 20 August at 2 p.m. local time. Maccabi Rishon LeZion, Hapoel Jerusalem, Ironi Nes Ziona and Ironi Nahariya automatically advanced to the Round of 16 and did not have to play in the first round.

== First round ==
The first round draw took place on 20 August, 2020.

4 November 2020	Maccabi Kiryat Motzkin	70–75	Elitzur Netanya	Kiryat Motzkin
18:50	Scoring by quarter: 19-17, 16-22, 13-20, 22-16
		Boxscore (Hebrew)		Arena: Goshen Hall; Attendance: 0

4 November 2020	Elitzur Eito Ashkelon	75–83	Hapoel Eilat	Ashkelon
18:50	Scoring by quarter: 22-22, 15-23, 22-18, 16-20
		Boxscore		Arena: Ashkelon Sports Arena; Attendance: 0

4 November 2020	A.S. Ramat HaSharon	80–67	Hapoel Hevel Modi'in	Ramat HaSharon
18:55	Scoring by quarter: 18-21, 25-16, 18-13, 19-17
		Boxscore (Hebrew)		Arena: Oranim Hall; Attendance: 0

4 November 2020	Ironi Kiryat Ata	59–89	Hapoel Be'er Sheva	Kiryat Ata
18:55	Scoring by quarter: 16-25, 24-16, 10-20, 9-28
		Boxscore (Hebrew)		Arena: Ramaz Hall; Attendance: 0

4 November 2020	Hapoel Afula	76–78	Maccabi Haifa	Afula
19:00	Scoring by quarter: 19-22, 21-16, 16-15, 20-25
	Pts: Jimmy Hall 22; Rebs: Jimmy Hall 17; Asts: Moriel Lutati 7 PIR: Jimmy Hall 28	Boxscore	Pts: Dowe 25; Rebs: Sorkin 12; Asts: Ben-Chimol 7 PIR: Dowe 36	Arena: Nir Ha'emak Hall; Attendance: 0 Referees: Ofer Manhaim, Yoav Lubhosihch, Itzik Toledo;

4 November 2020	Ironi Ramat Gan	70–89	Hapoel Acre/Mateh Asher	Ramat Gan
19:05	Scoring by quarter: 17-13, 18-32, 16-21, 19-23
		Boxscore (Hebrew)		Arena: Zisman Hall; Attendance: 0

5 November 2020	Hapoel Galil Elyon	64–84	Hapoel Haifa	Upper Galilee
18:55	Scoring by quarter: 13-29, 15-24, 18-22, 18-9
		Boxscore (Hebrew)		Arena: HaPais Kfar Blum; Attendance: 0

5 November 2020	Hapoel Ramat Gan Givatayim	74–75	Hapoel Tel Aviv	Ramat Gan
19:05	Scoring by quarter: 21-20, 23-19, 11-12, 19-24
		Boxscore		Arena: Zisman Hall; Attendance: 0

5 November 2020	Maccabi Ra'anana	58–83	Bnei Herzliya	Ra'anana
19:10	Scoring by quarter: 16-23, 14-22, 15-15, 13-23
		Boxscore (Hebrew)		Arena: Metro West; Attendance: 0

5 November 2020	Elitzur Yavne	66–87	Hapoel Gilboa Galil	Yavne
19:15	Scoring by quarter: 11-23, 18-25, 16-18, 21-21
		Boxscore		Arena: Ralf Klain Hall; Attendance: 0

9 November 2020	Maccabi Ashdod	69–75	Maccabi Tel Aviv	Ashdod
21:00	Scoring by quarter: 19-20, 13-21, 23-16, 14-18
				Arena: HaKiriya Arena; Attendance: 0

26 November 2020	Maccabi Hod HaSharon	50–90	Hapoel Holon	Ra'anana
20:45	Scoring by quarter: 12-25, 10-19, 9-32, 19-14
		Boxscore (Hebrew)		Arena: Aviv Hall; Attendance: 0

== Round of 16 ==
The Round of 16 draw took place on 10 November, 2020.

13 December 2020	Hapoel Haifa	73–98	Maccabi Tel Aviv	Haifa
20:15	Scoring by quarter: 19-22, 21-21, 15-31, 18-24
Sport 5	Pts: Evans & Nesterenko 16; Rebs: Buckles & Freeman 6 Asts: Evans 6 PIR: Nesterenko 18	Boxscore	Pts: Wilbekin 21; Rebs: Žižić 11; Asts: Wilbekin 8 PIR: Wilbekin & Žižić 27	Arena: Romema Arena; Attendance: 0 Referees: Dan Yalon, Guy Shmueli, Rotem Koza

19 December 2020	Hapoel Acre/Mateh Asher	67–87	Hapoel Holon	Kiryat Ata
18:00	Scoring by quarter: 13-17, 17-28, 21-28, 16-14
	Pts: Moran 26; Rebs: Moran & Williams 7 Asts: Uzan 8 PIR: Moran 26	Boxscore (Hebrew)	Pts: McGee 14; Rebs: Workman & De Zeeuw 7 Asts: McGee 8 PIR: Workman & Pnini 17	Arena: Ramaz Hall; Attendance: 0 Referees: Ofer Manheim, Lior Beynish, Elias Abu-Arab

19 December 2020	Hapoel Jerusalem	90–81	Hapoel Eilat	Jerusalem
20:00	Scoring by quarter: 20-20, 28-19, 18-19, 24-23
	Pts: Kramer 19; Rebs: Zalmanson 7 Asts: Blatt 10; PIR: Kramer 23	Boxscore	Pts: Nebo 22; Rebs: Nebo 9 Asts: Ragland 6 PIR: Nebo 32	Arena: Pais Arena; Attendance: 0 Referees: Gili Cohen, Adar Peer, David Izmirli

20 December 2020	Maccabi Rishon LeZion	87–80	Hapoel Be'er Sheva	Rishon LeZion
19:50	Scoring by quarter: 26-27, 22-20, 21-12, 18-21
	Pts: Mitchell 24; Rebs: Mitchell 13; Asts: Monroe 7 PIR: Mitchell 45	Boxscore	Pts: Bell 25; Rebs: Griffin & Weisz 9 Asts: Weisz 5 PIR: Bell 27	Arena: Beit Maccabi; Attendance: 0 Referees: Sefi Shemesh, Nir Meirson, David Kolangi

20 December 2020	A.S. Ramat HaSharon	80–101	Maccabi Haifa	A.S. Ramat HaSharon
20:10	Scoring by quarter: 24-27, 24-24, 15-26, 17-24
	Pts: Lewis 24; Rebs: Moscovitz 4 Asts: Yam & Stutz 3 PIR: Lewis 31	Boxscore	Pts: Sorkin 27; Rebs: Sorkin 10; Asts: Sharon 12; PIR: Sorkin 39	Arena: Oranim Hall; Attendance: 0 Referees: Guy Shmueli, Noam Gordon, Tommy Weber

20 December 2020	Ironi Nahariya	75–83	Hapoel Gilboa Galil	Nahariya
20:35	Scoring by quarter: 20-18, 22-21, 22-23, 11-21
	Pts: Young 21; Rebs: Blossomgame 8 Asts: Blossomgame 3 PIR: Young 22	Boxscore (Hebrew)	Pts: Thomasson 18; Rebs: Blackshear 8 Asts: Three players 3 PIR: Thomasson & Cousins 15	Arena: Ein Sara Sport Hall; Attendance: 0 Referees: Omer Esteron, Dan Yalon, Alex Naftali

20 December 2020	Elitzur Netanya	70–77	Hapoel Tel Aviv	Netanya
21:00	Scoring by quarter: 23-12, 17-16, 16-24, 14-25
	Pts: Moskovits 24; Rebs: Goya 15; Asts: Aharoni 6 PIR: Goya 29	Boxscore	Pts: York 18; Rebs: Tokoto & Upshaw 8 Asts: York & Madar 5 PIR: York 22	Arena: Yeshurun Hall; Attendance: 0 Referees: Tzaci Hevdali, Eran Shmuel, Assaf Engelberg

21 December 2020	Ironi Nes Ziona	98–91	Bnei Herzliya	Ness Ziona
19:40	Scoring by quarter: 24-31, 17-18, 31-20, 26-22
	Pts: Angola 23; Rebs: Angola 10; Asts: Angola 7 PIR: Angola 37	Boxscore (Hebrew)	Pts: Clarke 22; Rebs: Clarke 13; Asts: Clarke & Gaddy 3 PIR: Clarke 32	Arena: Lev Hamoshava; Attendance: 0 Referees: Kfir Mualem, Ori Shalhavi, Yoav Luboshitz

== Quarterfinals ==
The draw for the quarter-finals took place on 22 December, 2020.

2 January 2020	Maccabi Haifa	88–96	Hapoel Holon	Haifa
20:00	Scoring by quarter: 27-30, 15-21, 24-25, 22-20
	Pts: Brisker 22; Rebs: Sorkin 10; Asts: Smith 6 PIR: Smith 28	Boxscore (Hebrew)	Pts: McGee & Pnini 19; Rebs: Workman 7 Asts: McGee 5 PIR: Pnini 22	Arena: Romema Arena; Attendance: 0 Referees: Omer Esteron, Nir Meirson, Adar Peer

3 January 2020	Maccabi Rishon LeZion	88–83	Ironi Nes Ziona	Rishon LeZion
18:00	Scoring by quarter: 29-18, 15-21, 20-20, 24-24
	Pts: Taylor 23; Rebs: Mitchell & Monroe 10; Asts: Dovrat 6 PIR: Mitchell 27	Boxscore	Pts: Meyinsse 24; Rebs: Meyinsse 9 Asts: Miller 5 PIR: Meyinsse 31	Arena: Beit Maccabi; Attendance: 0 Referees: Amit Balak, Kfir Mualem, David Izmirli

3 January 2020	Maccabi Tel Aviv	83–66	Hapoel Tel Aviv	Tel Aviv
20:00	Scoring by quarter: 25-13, 22-19, 18-22, 18-12
	Pts: Žižić 26; Rebs: Žižić 13; Asts: Bryant 6 PIR: Žižić 46	Boxscore	Pts: Tokoto 18; Rebs: Tokoto 6 Asts: Madar 9 PIR: Tokoto 23	Arena: Menora Mivtachim Arena; Attendance: 0 Referees: Erez Gurion, David Romano, Elad Leibowitz

4 January 2020	Hapoel Gilboa Galil	65–80	Hapoel Jerusalem	Gan Ner
21:00	Scoring by quarter: 17-15, 16-21, 20-23, 12-21
	Pts: Cousins 13; Rebs: Floyd 8 Asts: Cousins 4 PIR: Floyd 18		Pts: Thomas 24; Rebs: Thomas 9 Asts: Brown 8 PIR: Thomas 35	Arena: Gan Ner Sports Hall; Attendance: 0 Referees: Sefi Shemesh, Lior Beynish, Noam Gordon

== Final Four ==
The draw for the semi-finals took place on 7 January, 2021.

=== Bracket ===
Semifinals; February 11, 2021
18:30
Maccabi Rishon LeZion	90
Hapoel Jerusalem	84
21:10
Hapoel Holon	85
Maccabi Tel Aviv	87

Final; May 27, 2021
Maccabi Rishon LeZion	69
Maccabi Tel Aviv	86

=== Semifinals ===
11 February 2021	Maccabi Rishon LeZion	90–84	Hapoel Jerusalem	Tel Aviv
18:30	Scoring by quarter: 22-20, 17-21, 21-19, 30-24
	Pts: Gutt 22; Rebs: Monroe 11; Asts: Taylor & Lewis 5 PIR: Mitchell 25		Pts: Braimoh 27; Rebs: Braimoh & Hill 9 Asts: Brown 10; PIR: Braimoh 34	Arena: Drive in Arena; Attendance: 9

Starters:			Pts	Reb	Ast
G/F	7	(Israel) Golan Gutt	22	1	3
G	11	(United States) Isaiah Taylor	17	3	5
F/C	25	(Panama) Akil Mitchell	16	8	3
F/C	86	(United States) Darryl Monroe	8	11	3
PF	10	(Israel) Noam Avivi	3	2	1
Reserves:					
PG	3	(United States) Trey Lewis	15	2	5
PG	30	(Israel) Nimrod Tishman	4	1	1
SG	14	(Israel) Noam Dovrat	3	0	0
C	33	(Israel) Ido Flaisher	2	1	0
G	6	(Israel) Gal Tesler	DNP		
G/F	8	(Israel) Guy Altman	DNP		
F	32	(Israel) Beni Elazar	DNP		
Head coach:
(Israel) Guy Goodes

M. Rishon LeZion	H. Jerusalem

M. Rishon LeZion	Statistics	H. Jerusalem
21/37 (56.8%)	2 point field goals	23/36 (63.9%)
10/22 (45.5%)	3 point field goals	9/33 (27.3%)
18/31 (58.1%)	Free throws	11/14 (78.6%)
35	Rebounds	36
21	Assists	23
8	Steals	2
11	Turnovers	11
0	Blocks	4

Starters:			Pts	Reb	Ast
F/C	17	(Nigeria) Suleiman Braimoh	27	9	1
SF	21	(United States) Malcolm Hill	23	9	1
G	69	(United States) J'Covan Brown	11	4	10
F/C	35	(United States) TaShawn Thomas	7	4	2
PG	6	(Israel) Tamir Blatt	5	3	7
Reserves:					
C	20	(Israel) Idan Zalmanson	6	2	0
PF	99	(United States) Jamil Wilson	3	0	2
PG	12	(Israel) Adi Cohen Saban	2	0	0
G/F	11	(Israel) Adam Ariel	0	3	0
PG	15	(Israel) Yuval Sznaiderman	DNP		
PF	25	(Israel) Niv Baloul	DNP		
G	33	(Israel) Eylon Sason	DNP		
Head coach:
(Lithuania) Dainius Adomaitis

11 February 2021	Hapoel Holon	85–87(OT)	Maccabi Tel Aviv	Tel Aviv
21:10	Scoring by quarter: 18-20, 18-15, 25-15, 11-22, Overtime: 13-15
	Pts: McGee 21; Rebs: Johnson 9 Asts: Harris 4 PIR: McGee 18		Pts: Blayzer 19; Rebs: Zoosman & Hunter 8 Asts: Zoosman & DiBartolomeo 4 PIR: Blayzer 21	Arena: Drive in Arena; Attendance: 9

Starters:			Pts	Reb	Ast
SG	25	(United States) Tyrus McGee	21	1	2
PF	32	(United States) Isaiah Miles	14	6	0
SF	4	(United States) Chris Johnson	8	9	3
C	14	(Belgium) Maxime De Zeeuw	4	6	0
SF	2	(United States) Willy Workman	3	2	1
Reserves:					
G	11	(United States) C. J. Harris	18	2	4
F	10	(Israel) Guy Pnini	17	2	2
SG	8	(France) Frédéric Bourdillon	0	0	0
PG	9	(Israel) Oded Brandwein	0	0	0
PG	24	(Israel) Yogev Ohayon	DNP		
PG	44	(Israel) Niv Misgav	DNP		
Head coach:
(Greece) Stefanos Dedas

H. Holon	M. Tel Aviv

H. Holon	Statistics	M. Tel Aviv
10/29 (34.5%)	2 point field goals	22/41 (53.7%)
14/36 (38.9%)	3 point field goals	8/25 (32%)
23/26 (88.5%)	Free throws	19/25 (73.1%)
39	Rebounds	39
12	Assists	20
7	Steals	13
17	Turnovers	15
1	Blocks	2

Starters:			Pts	Reb	Ast
G	1	(United States) Scottie Wilbekin	15	1	2
SF	50	(Israel) Yovel Zoosman	13	8	4
C	23	(Croatia) Ante Žižić	11	4	2
SG	0	(United States) Elijah Bryant	10	1	3
F	4	(United States) Angelo Caloiaro	2	4	1
Reserves:					
F	14	(Israel) Oz Blayzer	19	3	0
C	5	(United States) Othello Hunter	11	8	3
PG	12	(United States) John DiBartolomeo	5	2	4
G/F	6	(Israel) Sandy Cohen	1	3	1
F/C	2	(United States) T. J. Cline	DNP		
PG	3	(United States) Chris Jones	DNP		
SG	24	(Israel) Eidan Alber	DNP		
Head coach:
(Greece) Ioannis Sfairopoulos

=== Final ===
27 May 2021	Maccabi Tel Aviv	86–69	Maccabi Rishon LeZion	Holon
20:45	Scoring by quarter: 19-17, 25-21, 21-17, 21-14
	Pts: Three players 16; Rebs: Žižić & Casspi 8 Asts: Wilbekin 7 PIR: Žižić 26		Pts: Koulechov 18; Rebs: Koulechov 7 Asts: Tishman 5 PIR: Koulechov 24	Arena: Holon Toto Hall

Starters:			Pts	Reb	Ast
C	23	(Croatia) Ante Žižić	16	8	2
SF	50	(Israel) Yovel Zoosman	16	6	5
G	1	(United States) Scottie Wilbekin	16	1	7
F	4	(United States) Angelo Caloiaro	8	7	1
F	7	(Israel) Omri Casspi	7	8	2
Reserves:					
PG	12	(United States) John DiBartolomeo	9	3	3
F	14	(Israel) Oz Blayzer	7	3	3
PG	3	(United States) Chris Jones	5	2	1
G/F	6	(Israel) Sandy Cohen	0	0	1
C	5	(United States) Othello Hunter	2	2	0
F/C	2	(United States) T. J. Cline	0	0	0
G/F	18	(Israel) Dori Sahar	0	0	0
Head coach:
(Greece) Ioannis Sfairopoulos

M. Tel Aviv	M. Rishon LeZion

M. Tel Aviv	Statistics	M. Rishon LeZion
18/31 (58.1%)	2 point field goals	17/33 (51.5%)
15/36 (41.7%)	3 point field goals	9/29 (31%)
5/9 (55.6%)	Free throws	8/13 (61.5%)
42	Rebounds	32
25	Assists	20
5	Steals	3
8	Turnovers	8
3	Blocks	3

Starters:			Pts	Reb	Ast
G	9	(Israel) Tal Peled	11	3	1
PF	10	(Israel) Noam Avivi	5	6	0
	12	(Israel) Yogev Ovadia	2	0	0
C	33	(Israel) Ido Flaisher	1	0	1
	18	(Israel) Omar Hamama	0	0	1
Reserves:					
G/F	77	(Israel) Egor Koulechov	18	7	3
F/C	25	(Panama) Akil Mitchell	17	4	4
G/F	7	(Israel) Golan Gutt	10	1	4
PG	30	(Israel) Nimrod Tishman	5	5	5
G	6	(Israel) Gal Tesler	0	1	1
	15	(Israel) Tomer Bardugo	DNP		
F	32	(Israel) Beni Elazar	DNP		
Head coach:
(Israel) Guy Goodes

2021 Israeli State Cup Winners
Maccabi Tel Aviv
(45th title)
