= Mark Tollefsen =

American basketball player (born 1992)

Personal information
- Born: November 21, 1992 (age 32) Danville, California, U.S.
- Listed height: 6 ft 9 in (2.06 m)
- Listed weight: 199 lb (90 kg)

Career information
- High school: San Ramon Valley (Danville, California)
- College: San Francisco (2012–2015); Arizona (2015–2016)
- NBA draft: 2016: undrafted
- Playing career: 2016–present
- Position: Power forward / small forward

Career history
- 2016–2017: BC Kalev
- 2017–2018: Maccabi Rishon LeZion
- 2018–2019: Maccabi Ashdod
- 2020: Maccabi Ashdod

Career highlights
- Israeli League Top Scorer (2019); Estonian League champion (2017); Estonian League All-Star (2017); Estonian Cup winner (2017); Second-team All-WCC (2015)

Mark Tollefsen (born November 21, 1992) is an American professional basketball player who last played for Maccabi Ashdod of the Israeli Premier League. He played college basketball for the University of San Francisco and University of Arizona before playing professionally in Estonia and Israel. In 2018–19, he was the top scorer in the Israel Basketball Premier League.

== Early life and college career ==
Tollefsen attended San Ramon Valley High School in Danville, California, where he earned third-team All-East Bay and All-Metro honors after shooting 54.0 percent from the floor and 45.0 percent from the arc as a senior. Tollefsen helped lead San Ramon to a 28–4 record and a share of the EBAL title as a junior.

Tollefsen played college basketball at San Francisco, where he averaged 13.9 points, 5.4 rebounds and 1.5 assists in his junior year. He was ranked fifth in the WCC in field goal percentage (.535), 10th in scoring average and 15th in rebounding average. On March 8, 2015, Tollefsen was named to the second-team All-West Coast Conference.

On April 27, 2015, Tollefsen transferred from San Francisco to Arizona as a graduate transfer. In his senior year at Arizona, he averaged 7 points and 3 rebounds and 1.2 assists while appearing in all 34 games with 13 starts.

== Professional career ==
=== Kalev/Cramo (2016–2017) ===
On September 10, 2016, Tollefsen started his professional career with the Estonian team Kalev/Cramo, signing a one-year deal. On January 31, 2017, Tollefsen recorded a season-high 29 points, shooting 12-of-19 from the field, along with eight rebounds and three blocks in an 88–64 blowout win over Tallinna Kalev. On February 16, 2017, Tollefsen participated in the Estonian League All-Star Game. Tollefsen helped Kalev/Cramo to win the 2017 Estonian Cup and the 2017 Estonian League Championship.

=== Maccabi Rishon LeZion (2017–2018) ===
On August 20, 2017, Tollefsen signed with the Israeli team Maccabi Rishon LeZion for the 2017–18 season. On December 18, 2017, Tollefsen recorded a season-high 23 points, shooting 8-of-12 from the field, along with 12 rebounds, 6 assists and 5 steals in a 93–80 win over Bnei Herzliya.

=== Maccabi Ashdod (2018–2019) ===
On August 1, 2018, Tollefsen signed a one-year deal with Maccabi Ashdod. On January 24, 2019, Tollefsen recorded a double-double with a career-high 31 points and 10 rebounds, shooting 7-of-16 from the three-point range, along with two assists in a 100–104 overtime loss to Maccabi Tel Aviv. On May 6, 2019, Tollefsen recorded 27 points, shooting 6-of-10 from the three-point range, along with nine rebounds, leading Ashdod to a 101–92 win over Ironi Nes Ziona. He was subsequently named Israeli League Round 30 MVP. Tollefsen finished the season as the league top scorer with 20.4 points, along with 5.5 rebounds and 1.1 assists per game, while shooting 44.3 percent from three-point range.

=== Return to Ashdod (2020–present) ===
On February 8, 2020, Tollefsen returned to Maccabi Ashdod for a second stint, signing for the rest of the season.

== Career statistics ==
Legend
GP	Games played	MPG	Minutes per game	FG%	Field goal percentage
3P%	3-point field goal percentage	FT%	Free throw percentage	RPG	Rebounds per game
APG	Assists per game	SPG	Steals per game	BPG	Blocks per game
PPG	Points per game	**Bold**	Career high		Led the league

=== Domestic Leagues ===
Year	Team	League	GP	MPG	FG%	3P%	FT%	RPG	APG	SPG	BPG	PPG
2016–17	(Estonia) Kalev/Cramo	KML	**28**	25.9	.530	.364	.729	4.7	**1.3**	.7	**.7**	12.0
2016–17	(Estonia) Kalev/Cramo	VTB	23	25.6	.495	**.465**	.636	4.1	.9	.5	.4	11.0
2017–18	(Israel) Rishon LeZion	IPL	24	26.5	.498	.333	.775	5.4	1.0	.7	.7	12.0
2018–19	(Israel) Ashdod	IPL	26	**33.0**	**.544**	.443	**.815**	**5.5**	1.1	**.8**	.2	**20.4**

Source: RealGM
