= 2022 Israeli Basketball State Cup =

Israeli Basketball State Cup season

Tournament details
- Country: Israel
- Dates: 16 January – 17 February 2022
- Teams: 8
- Defending champions: Maccabi Tel Aviv

Final positions
- Champions: Bnei Herzliya
- Runners-up: Hapoel Tel Aviv
- Semifinalists: Hapoel Holon; Maccabi Tel Aviv

Tournament statistics
- Matches played: 7

Awards
- MVP: (United States) Chinanu Onuaku
- All statistics correct as of 31 October 2021.

The 2022 Israeli Basketball State Cup, for sponsorships reasons the Migdal State Cup, will be the 62nd edition of the Israeli Basketball State Cup, organized by the Israel Basketball Association.

On 10 May 2021, the Israel Basketball Association announced a change in the State Cup tournament format. only the first 8 teams at the end of the first rotation of the Israeli Basketball Premier League will compete in the State Cup and not all the teams participate in the Premier League and the Israeli Basketball National League.

On 31 October, 2021, the Israel Basketball Association announced that the draw for the tournament would be held on 28 December.

== Qualified teams ==
The top eight ranking teams after the first rotation (11 rounds) of the 2021–22 Israeli Basketball Premier League regular season qualified to the tournament.

| Pos | Team | Pld | W | L | PF | PA | PD | PCT | Qualification |
|---|---|---|---|---|---|---|---|---|---|
| 1 | Hapoel Jerusalem | 11 | 9 | 2 | 923 | 823 | +100 | .818 | qualified |
| 2 | Hapoel Holon | 11 | 7 | 4 | 896 | 867 | +29 | .636 | qualified |
| 3 | Maccabi Tel Aviv | 11 | 7 | 4 | 953 | 852 | +101 | .636 | qualified |
| 4 | Bnei Herzliya | 11 | 7 | 4 | 919 | 890 | +29 | .636 | qualified |
| 5 | Hapoel Galil Elyon | 11 | 6 | 5 | 885 | 874 | +11 | .545 | qualified |
| 6 | Ironi Ness Ziona | 11 | 6 | 5 | 885 | 917 | −32 | .545 | qualified |
| 7 | Hapoel Haifa | 11 | 5 | 6 | 857 | 889 | −32 | .455 | qualified |
| 8 | Hapoel Tel Aviv | 11 | 5 | 6 | 914 | 889 | +25 | .455 | qualified |
| 9 | Hapoel Be'er Sheva | 11 | 4 | 7 | 857 | 884 | −27 | .364 | |
| 10 | Hapoel Gilboa Galil | 11 | 4 | 7 | 884 | 936 | −52 | .364 | |
| 11 | Hapoel Eilat | 11 | 4 | 7 | 923 | 935 | −12 | .364 | |
| 12 | Maccabi Rishon LeZion | 11 | 2 | 9 | 829 | 969 | −140 | .182 | |

== Bracket ==
Quarterfinals; 16 January, 3, 5 & 7 February
16 January, 21:00
Hapoel Holon | 85
Hapoel Haifa | 79
3 February, 19:20
Ironi Ness Ziona | 70
Bnei Herzliya | 86
5 February, 20:10
Hapoel Tel Aviv | 87
Hapoel Jerusalem | 71
7 February, 17:30
Hapoel Galil Elyon | 77
Maccabi Tel Aviv | 88

Semifinals; 13–14 February
13 February, 18:45
Hapoel Holon | 63
Bnei Herzliya | 83
14 February, 21:00
Hapoel Tel Aviv | 90
Maccabi Tel Aviv | 80

Final; 17 February
Bnei Herzliya | 87
Hapoel Tel Aviv | 82

== Quarterfinals ==
| 3 February | Ironi Ness Ziona | 70–86 | Bnei Herzliya | Ness Ziona |
| 19:20 | Scoring by quarter: 18–21, 19–27, 20–14, 13–24 |
| | Pts: Bartley 24; Rebs: Shittu 8 Asts: Bartley 6 PIR: Bartley 19 | Boxscore | Pts: Babb 26; Rebs: Onuaku 9 Asts: Van Vliet 4 PIR: Dawson 24 | Arena: Lev Hamoshava |

| 7 February | Hapoel Galil Elyon | 77–88 | Maccabi Tel Aviv | Kfar Blum |
| 17:30 | Scoring by quarter: 27–29, 27–14, 7–26, 16–19 |
| | Pts: Moskovich 18; Rebs: Chachashvili 9 Asts: Moskovich & Lewis 4 PIR: Moskovich 19 | Boxscore | Pts: Wilbekin 16; Rebs: Sorkin 7 Asts: Ziv & Wilbekin 4 PIR: Sorkin 18 | Arena: HaPais Kfar Blum |

| 5 February | Hapoel Tel Aviv | 87–71 | Hapoel Jerusalem | Tel Aviv |
| 20:10 | Scoring by quarter: 14–17, 36–23, 19–20, 18–11 |
| | Pts: Brown & Tokoto 16; Rebs: Tokoto 7 Asts: Brown 7 PIR: Brown 22 | Boxscore | Pts: Braimoh 18; Rebs: Three players 6 Asts: Obasohan 5 PIR: Braimoh 23 | Arena: Drive in Arena |

| 16 January | Hapoel Holon | 85–79(OT) | Hapoel Haifa | Holon |
| 21:00 | Scoring by quarter: 19–11, 8–30, 22–12, 15–11, Overtime: 21–15 |
| | Pts: Ragland 22; Rebs: Johnson 10; Asts: Smith 5 PIR: Johnson 18 | Boxscore | Pts: Allen 24; Rebs: Allen & James 9 Asts: Vargas 5 PIR: Allen 26 | Arena: Holon Toto Hall |

== Semifinals ==
| 13 February | Hapoel Holon | 63–83 | Bnei Herzliya | Tel Aviv |
| 18:45 | Scoring by quarter: 13–26, 19–24, 11–19, 20–14 |
| | Pts: Ragland 25; Rebs: Ragland & Zack 6 Asts: Ragland 9 PIR: Ragland 31 | Boxscore | Pts: Onuaku 21; Rebs: Hooker 8 Asts: Hooker 9 PIR: Onuaku 32 | Arena: Menora Mivtachim Arena |

| 14 February | Hapoel Tel Aviv | 90–80 | Maccabi Tel Aviv | Tel Aviv |
| 21:00 | Scoring by quarter: 22–25, 23–19, 20–12, 25–24 |
| | Pts: Brown 30; Rebs: Tokoto 9 Asts: Brown 9 PIR: Brown 39 | Boxscore | Pts: Wilbekin 23; Rebs: Žižić 12; Asts: Wilbekin & Evans 3 PIR: Evans 24 | Arena: Menora Mivtachim Arena |

== Final ==
| 17 February | Bnei Herzliya | 87–82 | Hapoel Tel Aviv | Tel Aviv |
| 21:00 | Scoring by quarter: 12–21, 25–18, 29–25, 21–18 |
| | Pts: Onuaku 30; Rebs: Onuaku 17; Asts: Hooker 5 PIR: Onuaku 50 | Boxscore | Pts: Brown & Young 21; Rebs: Zalmanson 5 Asts: Brown 6 PIR: Brown 16 | Arena: Menora Mivtachim Arena |

| Starters: | | | Pts | Reb | Ast |
|---|---|---|---|---|---|
| F/C | 32 | (United States) Chinanu Onuaku | 30 | 17 | 4 |
| SG | 19 | (United States) Chris Babb | 13 | 3 | 3 |
| PG | 21 | (United States) Quinton Hooker | 12 | 2 | 5 |
| G/F | 1 | (Israel) Sandy Cohen | 9 | 6 | 1 |
| PF | 11 | (Belgium) Andy Van Vliet | 3 | 4 | 1 |
| Reserves: | | | | | |
| SF | 8 | (Israel) Shawn Dawson | 16 | 5 | 2 |
| F | 9 | (United States) Maurice Kemp | 3 | 3 | 0 |
| G | 3 | (Israel) Yair Kravitz | 1 | 1 | 1 |
| G | 6 | (Israel) Dori Sahar | DNP | | |
| G | 12 | (Israel) Edo Fogel | DNP | | |
| F | 13 | (Israel) Noam Weinberg | DNP | | |
| PG | 18 | (Israel) Omri Kuperman | DNP | | |
Head coach:
(Israel) Oren Aharoni

| B. Herzliya | H. Tel Aviv |

| B. Herzliya | Statistics | H. Tel Aviv |
|---|---|---|
| 22/35 (62.86%) | 2 point field goals | 16/34 (47.06%) |
| 7/26 (26.92%) | 3 point field goals | 14/33 (42.42%) |
| 22/28 (78.57%) | Free throws | 8/13 (61.54%) |
| 44 | Rebounds | 31 |
| 17 | Assists | 13 |
| 3 | Steals | 8 |
| 12 | Turnovers | 7 |
| 8 | Blocks | 0 |

| Starters: | | | Pts | Reb | Ast |
|---|---|---|---|---|---|
| G | 69 | (United States) J'Covan Brown | 21 | 4 | 6 |
| G/F | 13 | (United States) James Young | 21 | 2 | 1 |
| F | 1 | (United States) JP Tokoto | 14 | 4 | 0 |
| C | 20 | (Israel) Idan Zalmanson | 6 | 5 | 1 |
| PG | 6 | (Israel) Gil Beni | 3 | 2 | 1 |
| Reserves: | | | | | |
| G | 10 | (Israel) Bar Timor | 10 | 4 | 3 |
| F/C | 22 | (United States) Josh Owens | 4 | 5 | 1 |
| G/F | 77 | (Israel) Egor Koulechov | 3 | 0 | 0 |
| F | 8 | (Israel) Lotan Amsalem | 0 | 1 | 0 |
| G | 18 | (Israel) Raz Adam | 0 | 0 | 0 |
| G | 33 | (Israel) Matan Hachamo | DNP | | |
| F | 51 | (Israel) Gidi Shiffer | DNP | | |
Head coach:
(Israel) Danny Franco

2022 Israeli State Cup Winners
Bnei Herzliya
(2nd title)
