= 2018–19 Israeli Basketball Premier League =

Israeli Basketball Premier League
- Season: 2018-19
- Dates: 6 October 2018 – 13 June 2019
- Teams: 12
- TV partner(s): Sports Channel

Regular season
- Season MVP: (United States) Corey Walden
- Promoted: Maccabi Haifa
- Relegated: Bnei Herzliya

Finals
- Champions: Maccabi Tel Aviv (53rd title)
- Runners-up: Maccabi Rishon LeZion
- Semifinalists: Hapoel Jerusalem; Hapoel Eilat
- Finals MVP: (Israel) John DiBartolomeo

Awards
- Sixth Man: (Nigeria) Suleiman Braimoh
- Rising Star: (Israel) Amit Gershon
- Best Defender: (United States) TaShawn Thomas
- Most Improved: (Israel) Netanel Artzi

Statistical leaders
Points	(United States) Mark Tollefsen	20.4
Rebounds	(United States) Greg Whittington	9.6
Assists	(Israel) Avi Ben Chimol	7.8
Index Rating	(United States) Greg Whittington	24.6

The 2018–19 Israeli Basketball Premier League, for sponsorship reasons Ligat Winner, is the 65th season of the Israeli Basketball Premier League. Maccabi Tel Aviv is the defending champion.

== Teams ==
Teams of the 2018–19 Israeli Basketball Premier League

Hapoel Be'er Sheva was promoted from the Liga Leumit, after they swept Maccabi Kiryat Gat 3–0 in the finals. Meanwhile, Maccabi Haifa was relegated after finishing in the last place the previous season.

=== Stadia and locations ===
Team	Home city	Stadium	Capacity
Bnei Herzliya	Herzliya	HaYovel Herzliya	1,500
Hapoel Be'er Sheva	Be'er Sheva	Conch Arena	3,000
Hapoel Eilat	Eilat	Begin Arena	1,490
Hapoel Gilboa Galil	Gilboa Regional Council	Gan Ner Sports Hall	2,100
Hapoel Holon	Holon	Holon Toto Hall	5,500
Hapoel Jerusalem	Jerusalem	Pais Arena	11,000
Hapoel Tel Aviv	Tel Aviv	Drive in Arena	3,504
Ironi Nahariya	Nahariya	Ein Sarah	2,500
Ironi Nes Ziona	Ness Ziona	Lev Hamoshava	1,200
Maccabi Ashdod	Ashdod	HaKiriya Arena	2,200
Maccabi Rishon LeZion	Rishon LeZion	Beit Maccabi Rishon	2,500
Maccabi Tel Aviv	Tel Aviv	Menora Mivtachim Arena	10,383

=== Personnel and sponsorship ===
Team	Chairman	Head coach	Kit manufacturer	Shirt sponsor
Bnei Herzliya	(Israel) Eldad Akunis	(Israel) Arik Shivek	Peak	Rav-Bariach
Hapoel Be'er Sheva	(Israel) Kfir Arazi	(Israel) Rami Hadar	Spalding	Altshuler Shaham
Hapoel Eilat	(Israel) Nachi Indik	(Israel) Sharon Drucker	And1	Mall Hayam
Hapoel Gilboa Galil	(Israel) Haim Ohayon	(Israel) Ariel Beit-Halahmy	Peak	
Hapoel Holon	(Israel) Shlomo Issac	(Israel) Dan Shamir	Peak	UNET
Hapoel Jerusalem	(Israel) Eyal Chomski	(Israel) Oded Kattash	Peak	Bank Yahav
Hapoel Tel Aviv	(Israel) Rami Cohen	(Israel) Danny Franco	Peak	SP
Ironi Nahariya	(Israel) Nissim Alfasi	(Israel) Eric Alfasi	Peak	
Ironi Nes Ziona	(Israel) Yaniv Mizrahi	(Israel) Nadav Zilberstein	Kappa	Hai Motors
Maccabi Ashdod	(Israel) Armaund Asulin	(United States) Brad Greenberg	And1	SCE
Maccabi Rishon LeZion	(Israel) Itzhak Peri	(Israel) Guy Goodes	Under Armour	Mitcham 1000
Maccabi Tel Aviv	(Israel) Shimon Mizrahi	(Greece) Ioannis Sfairopoulos	Nike	FOX

=== Managerial changes ===
Departure date	Team	Outgoing head coach	Reason	Hire date	Incoming head coach	Ref.
November 18, 2018	Maccabi Tel Aviv	(Croatia) Neven Spahija	Fired	November 18, 2018	(Greece) Ioannis Sfairopoulos	
November 26, 2018	Maccabi Rishon LeZion	(Israel) Zvika Sherf	Fired	November 30, 2018	(Israel) Guy Goodes	
December 11, 2018	Ironi Nahariya	(Israel) Mickey Gorka	Fired	December 13, 2018	(Israel) Eric Alfasi	
January 15, 2019	Bnei Herzliya	(Slovenia) Gašper Potočnik	Fired	January 15, 2019	(Israel) Ofer Berkovich	
January 30, 2019	Bnei Herzliya	(Israel) Ofer Berkovich	Fired	January 31, 2019	(Israel) Arik Shivek	

== Regular season ==
=== League table ===
Pos	Team	Pld	W	L	PF	PA	PD	Pts	Qualification or relegation
1	Maccabi Tel Aviv	33	27	6	3013	2578	+435	60	Advance to playoffs
2	Hapoel Jerusalem	33	24	9	2994	2727	+267	57	Advance to playoffs
3	Hapoel Holon	33	24	9	2907	2838	+69	57	Advance to playoffs
4	Hapoel Eilat	33	22	11	2859	2635	+224	55	Advance to playoffs
5	Ironi Nes Ziona	33	16	17	2829	2865	−36	49	Advance to playoffs
6	Maccabi Rishon LeZion	33	15	18	2664	2734	−70	48	Advance to playoffs
7	Hapoel Be'er Sheva	33	15	18	2712	2683	+29	48	Advance to playoffs
8	Hapoel Tel Aviv	33	14	19	2766	2758	+8	47	Advance to playoffs
9	Maccabi Ashdod	33	13	20	2741	2937	−196	46	
10	Hapoel Gilboa Galil	33	12	21	2799	3037	−238	45	
11	Ironi Nahariya	33	9	24	2539	2798	−259	42	
12	Bnei Herzliya (R)	33	7	26	2528	2761	−233	40	Relegation to Liga Leumit

Updated to match(es) played on May 20, 2019. Source: Basket.co.il
(R) Relegated

=== Results ===
==== Rounds 1 to 22 ====
Home \ Away	BHE	HBS	HEI	HGG	HHO	HJE	HTA	INA	INZ	MAS	MRL	MTA
Bnei Herzliya	—	75–84	81–100	105–78	82–85	73–83	68–88	61–63	62–81	70–75	74–67	77–87
Hapoel Be'er Sheva	87–74	—	88–85	83–76	70–72	88–89	105–73	85–75	78–90	87–70	81–84	76–99
Hapoel Eilat	81–75	88–66	—	107–74	76–82	70–82	95–89	77–71	105–85	102–77	96–81	70–83
Hapoel Gilboa Galil	90–89	68–82	70–88	—	75–85	101–99	91–96	85–81	95–84	103–95	92–77	98–94
Hapoel Holon	86–78	86–78	108–102	112–106	—	101–82	78–75	78–72	78–88	88–84	85–81	100–95
Hapoel Jerusalem	98–77	89–79	83–99	94–81	94–74	—	87–75	92–53	90–82	104–94	94–76	78–89
Hapoel Tel Aviv	76–77	68–73	100–81	76–86	74–92	86–90	—	76–90	90–78	89–95	78–64	104–94
Ironi Nahariya	77–93	61–86	75–93	87–89	98–95	86–80	59–80	—	85–76	86–92	75–89	77–87
Ironi Nes Ziona	81–79	105–84	82–80	83–76	95–96	74–90	85–89	103–93	—	70–82	93–95	83–81
Maccabi Ashdod	94–73	84–99	68–85	79–80	71–94	64–87	81–78	93–74	80–75	—	80–90	100–104
Maccabi Rishon LeZion	77–72	71–66	72–75	107–99	70–78	77–72	62–85	75–58	84–90	92–79	—	92–94
Maccabi Tel Aviv	88–70	66–64	101–91	105–77	99–66	91–78	89–57	78–61	87–82	103–59	98–64	—

Updated to match(es) played on March 18, 2019. Source: Basket.co.il
Legend: Blue = home team win; Red = away team win.

==== Rounds 23 to 33 ====
Home \ Away	BHE	HBS	HEI	HGG	HHO	HJE	HTA	INA	INZ	MAS	MRL	MTA
Bnei Herzliya	—	68–92	—	—	—	69–76	—	—	—	86–97	74–66	58–102
Hapoel Be'er Sheva	—	—	—	104–77	—	89–118	—	—	91–103	88–97	77–53	64–96
Hapoel Eilat	74–73	64–52	—	—	87–72	—	85–76	90–69	89–77	—	—	—
Hapoel Gilboa Galil	81–95	—	91–82	—	73–94	—	70–92	96–93	90–91	—	—	—
Hapoel Holon	88–85	89–78	—	—	—	99–108	97–89	77–88	84–97	—	—	—
Hapoel Jerusalem	—	—	78–81	104–87	—	—	—	—	100–73	92–82	91–80	98–92
Hapoel Tel Aviv	90–73	102–96	—	—	—	92–91	—	—	—	104–76	—	76–85
Ironi Nahariya	72–76	68–92	—	—	—	93–103	78–69	—	—	—	—	71–77
Ironi Nes Ziona	97–86	—	—	—	—	—	100–98	75–77	—	92–101	85–84	—
Maccabi Ashdod	—	—	74–92	94–86	100–89	—	—	88–89	—	—	66–93	—
Maccabi Rishon LeZion	—	—	81–77	92–88	102–105	—	87–76	92–84	—	—	—	—
Maccabi Tel Aviv	—	—	99–92	88–70	86–94	—	—	—	86–74	90–73	97–87	—

Updated to match(es) played on May 20, 2019. Source: Basket.co.il
Legend: Blue = home team win; Red = away team win.

== Playoffs ==
The first round of the playoffs is played in a best-of-five format, with the higher seeded team playing the first, third and fifth game at home. The Playoffs started on May 23, 2019.

Team 1	Series	Team 2	Game 1	Game 2	Game 3	Game 4	Game 5
(1) Maccabi Tel Aviv	3–0	Hapoel Tel Aviv (8)	89–67	85–72	87–63	—	—
(4) Hapoel Eilat	3–1	Ironi Nes Ziona (5)	96–89	84–95	84–76	98–90	—
(3) Hapoel Holon	1–3	Maccabi Rishon LeZion (6)	84–95	85–95	100–79	76–92	—
(2) Hapoel Jerusalem	3–0	Hapoel Be'er Sheva (7)	85–68	99–75	95–77	—	—

== Final Four ==
Semifinals
June 10
Maccabi Tel Aviv	85
Hapoel Eilat	83
June 10
Hapoel Jerusalem	86
Maccabi Rishon LeZion	92

Final
June 13
Maccabi Tel Aviv	89
Maccabi Rishon LeZion	75

== All-Star Event ==
The 2019 Israeli League All-star event was held at the Menora Mivtachim Arena in Tel Aviv on 12 April 2019.

The International team won the game 134–130. The MVP of the game was JP Tokoto who scored 19 points along with five rebounds.

Guy Pnini won the Three-Point Shootout and Cor-J Cox won the Slam Dunk Contest.

=== Lineups ===
Israeli All-Stars
Pos	Player	Team
Starters
G	(Israel) Tamir Blatt	Hapoel Jerusalem
G	(Israel) Yiftach Ziv	Ironi Nahariya
G/F	(Israel) Yovel Zoosman	Maccabi Tel Aviv
F	(Israel) Guy Pnini	Hapoel Holon
C	(United States) (Israel) Amar'e Stoudemire ^{SPL}	Hapoel Jerusalem
Reserves
G	(Denmark) (Israel) Chanan Colman	Hapoel Be'er Sheva
G	(Israel) Joaquin Szuchman	Hapoel Gilboa Galil
G/F	(Israel) Egor Koulechov	Maccabi Rishon LeZion
F	(Israel) Rafi Menco	Hapoel Eilat
F	(Israel) Tal Dunne	Ironi Nes Ziona
F	(Israel) Nimrod Levi	Maccabi Ashdod
F	(Israel) Karam Mashour	Bnei Herzliya
F/C	(Israel) Tomer Ginat	Hapoel Tel Aviv
Head coach: (Israel) Oded Kattash (Hapoel Jerusalem)
Head coach: (Israel) Sharon Drucker (Hapoel Eilat)

International All-Stars
Pos	Player	Team
Starters
G	(United States) Corey Walden	Hapoel Holon
G	(Dominican Republic) James Feldeine	Hapoel Jerusalem
G/F	(United States) Daequan Cook	Ironi Nes Ziona
F	(United States) JP Tokoto	Hapoel Eilat
C	(United States) Tarik Black	Maccabi Tel Aviv
Reserves
G	(Mexico) Paul Stoll	Maccabi Ashdod
G	(United States) Jerel McNeal	Hapoel Tel Aviv
G	(United States) Alex Hamilton	Maccabi Rishon LeZion
G/F	(United States) Myke Henry	Ironi Nahariya
G/F	(United States) Jordan Swing	Hapoel Be'er Sheva
F	(United States) Greg Whittington	Hapoel Gilboa Galil
F/C	(United States) Jeff Adrien	Bnei Herzliya
Head coach: (Greece) Ioannis Sfairopoulos (Maccabi Tel Aviv)
Head coach: (Israel) Dan Shamir (Hapoel Holon)

^SPL Special roster addition.

=== Game ===
April 12, 2019	Israeli All-Stars	130–134	International All-Stars	Tel Aviv
13:00	Scoring by quarter: 29-33, 37-37, 38-47, 26-19
Sport 5	Pts: Stoudemire 24; Rebs: Zoosman & Stoudemire 6 Asts: Blatt 7 PIR: Zoosman 27	Box Score; Report	Pts: Tokoto 19; Rebs: Four players 5 Asts: Stoll 5 PIR: Tokoto 25	Arena: Menora Mivtachim Arena; Attendance: 10,000; Referees: Pini Rimon, Eran Shmuel, Gil Gordon

=== Three-Point Shootout ===
Contestants
Pos.	Player	Team	1st round	Final round
F	(Israel) Guy Pnini	Hapoel Holon	20	18
G	(Israel) Golan Gutt	Ironi Nes Ziona	21	16
G	(Dominican Republic) James Feldeine	Hapoel Jerusalem	16	—
G/F	(Israel) Adam Ariel	Maccabi Rishon LeZion	14	—
G/F	(United States) Jordan Swing	Hapoel Be'er Sheva	13	—
G	(United States) Jamal Shuler	Hapoel Tel Aviv	12	—
G/F	(United States) Michael Roll	Maccabi Tel Aviv	11	—
G	(Israel) Tamir Blatt	Hapoel Jerusalem	9	—

=== Slam Dunk Contest ===
Contestants
Pos.	Player	Team	1st round	Final round
G/F	(United States) Cor-J Cox	Maccabi Rishon LeZion	45	50
F/C	(United States) Deshawn Stephens	Hapoel Tel Aviv	47	45
F/C	(United States) James Kelly	Hapoel Gilboa Galil	45	45
F	(United States) JP Tokoto	Hapoel Eilat	—	—

== Statistical leaders ==
=== Points ===
Pos	Player	Club	PPG
1	(United States) Mark Tollefsen	Maccabi Ashdod	20.4
2	(United States) Corey Walden	Hapoel Holon	18.7
3	(United States) Greg Whittington	Hapoel Gilboa Galil	18.4
4	(United States) Elijah Bryant	Hapoel Eilat	17.6
5	(United States) Daequan Cook	Ironi Nes Ziona	17.1

=== Assists ===
Pos	Player	Club	APG
1	(Israel) Avi Ben-Chimol	Hapoel Eilat	7.8
2	(Mexico) Paul Stoll	Maccabi Ashdod	7.7
3	(Israel) Raviv Limonad	Hapoel Tel Aviv	5.5
4	(United States) Alex Hamilton	Maccabi Rishon LeZion	5.4
5	(United States) Corey Walden	Hapoel Holon	5.1

=== Rebounds ===
Pos	Player	Club	RPG
1	(United States) Greg Whittington	Hapoel Gilboa Galil	9.6
2	(United States) Jakim Donaldson	Hapoel Be'er Sheva	9.4
3	(United States) James Kelly	Hapoel Gilboa Galil	7.9
4	(Kosovo) Lis Shoshi	Maccabi Ashdod	7.7
5	(United States) JP Tokoto	Hapoel Eilat	7.6

=== Efficiency ===
Pos	Player	Club	PIR
1	(United States) Greg Whittington	Hapoel Gilboa Galil	24.6
2	(United States) Corey Walden	Hapoel Holon	23.0
3	(United States) Mark Tollefsen	Maccabi Ashdod	20.5
4	(United States) Elijah Bryant	Hapoel Eilat	19.4
5	(Nigeria) Suleiman Braimoh	Hapoel Eilat	19.3

=== Other statistics ===
Category	Player	Team	Average
Steals	(Mexico) Paul Stoll	Maccabi Ashdod	2.9
Blocks	(United States) Eric Griffin	Ironi Nahariya	2.1
Turnovers	(Mexico) Paul Stoll	Maccabi Ashdod	4.4
Minutes	(United States) Greg Whittington	Hapoel Gilboa Galil	35:20
2P%	(United States) Josh Owens	Hapoel Jerusalem	73.6%
3P%	(United States) Michael Roll	Maccabi Tel Aviv	49.0%
FT%	(Israel) John DiBartolomeo	Maccabi Tel Aviv	88.2%

Source: Basket.co.il

=== Individual game highs ===
Category	Player	Team	Total	Opponent
Points	(United States) Corey Walden	Hapoel Holon	37	Maccabi Rishon LeZion (May 13, 19)
Rebounds	(Israel) Tomer Ginat	Hapoel Tel Aviv	21	Maccabi Tel Aviv (May 12, 19)
Assists	(Israel) Avi Ben-Chimol	Hapoel Eilat	16	Maccabi Tel Aviv (April 11, 19)
Assists	(Mexico) Paul Stoll	Maccabi Ashdod	16	Hapoel Holon (May 20, 18)
Steals	(United States) Taylor Braun	Hapoel Be'er Sheva	8	Hapoel Tel Aviv (October 15, 18)
Blocks	(United States) Eric Griffin	Ironi Nahariya	5	Maccabi Tel Aviv (March 17, 19)
Blocks	(United States) Eric Griffin	Ironi Nahariya	5	Hapoel Tel Aviv (May 5, 19)
Three Pointers	(Israel) Amit Gershon	Hapoel Be'er Sheva	9	Hapoel Gilboa Galil (May 15, 19)

Source: RealGM

== Awards ==
=== Yearly awards ===
==== Finals MVP ====
Pos.	Player	Team
G	(United States) (Israel) John DiBartolomeo	Maccabi Tel Aviv

Source: basket.co.il

==== Regular season MVP ====
Pos.	Player	Team
G	(United States) Corey Walden	Hapoel Holon

Source: basket.co.il

==== Coach of the Year ====
Coach	Team
(Greece) Ioannis Sfairopoulos	Maccabi Tel Aviv

Source: basket.co.il

==== All-Israeli League Teams ====
First team		Second Team	
Player	Team	Player	Team
(United States) (Israel) John DiBartolomeo	Maccabi Tel Aviv	(United States) Cameron Long	Maccabi Rishon LeZion
(United States) Corey Walden	Hapoel Holon	(Israel) Tal Dunne	Ironi Nes Ziona
(Dominican Republic) James Feldeine	Hapoel Jerusalem	(Israel) Guy Pnini	Hapoel Holon
(United States) Elijah Bryant	Hapoel Eilat	(Nigeria) Suleiman Braimoh	Hapoel Eilat
(Israel) Tomer Ginat	Hapoel Tel Aviv	(United States) Tarik Black	Maccabi Tel Aviv

Source: basket.co.il

==== Quarterfinals MVP ====
Pos.	Player	Team
G	(United States) Cameron Long	Maccabi Rishon LeZion

Source: basket.co.il

==== Best Defender ====
Pos.	Player	Team
PF	(United States) TaShawn Thomas	Hapoel Jerusalem

Source: basket.co.il

==== Most Improved Player ====
Pos.	Player	Team
SF	(Israel) Netanel Artzi	Hapoel Gilboa Galil

Source: basket.co.il

==== Sixth Man of the Year ====
Pos.	Player	Team
F/C	(Nigeria) Suleiman Braimoh	Hapoel Eilat

Source: basket.co.il

==== Rising Star ====
Pos.	Player	Team
SG	(Israel) Amit Gershon	Hapoel Be'er Sheva

Source: basket.co.il

=== Monthly Awards ===
==== Player of the Month ====
Month	Rounds	Player	Team	EFF	Ref.
October	1–4	(United States) (Israel) John DiBartolomeo	Maccabi Tel Aviv	21.0	
November	5–8	(United States) Elijah Bryant	Hapoel Eilat	23.3	
December	9–11	(Israel) Tal Dunne	Ironi Nes Ziona	21.7	
January	12–15	(United States) Corey Walden	Hapoel Holon	39.8	
February	16–19	(United States) J'Covan Brown	Hapoel Jerusalem	23.7	
March	20–23	(Nigeria) Suleiman Braimoh	Hapoel Eilat	27.3	
April	24–28	(Dominican Republic) James Feldeine	Hapoel Jerusalem	26.3	

==== Israeli Player of the Month ====
Month	Rounds	Player	Team	EFF	Ref.
October	1–4	–	–	–	–
November	5–8	(Israel) Tomer Ginat (1/2)	Hapoel Tel Aviv	20.0	
December	9–11	–	–	–	–
January	12–15	(Israel) Yovel Zoosman	Maccabi Tel Aviv	14.4	
February	16–19	(Israel) Tomer Ginat (2/2)	Hapoel Tel Aviv	17.0	
March	20–23	(Israel) Guy Pnini	Hapoel Holon	16.0	
April	24–28	(United States) (Israel) Amar'e Stoudemire	Hapoel Jerusalem	17.8	

==== Coach of the Month ====
Month	Rounds	Coach	Team	W-L	Ref.
October	1–4	(Israel) Ariel Beit-Halahmy	Hapoel Gilboa Galil	3–1	
November	5–8	(Israel) Sharon Drucker (1/2)	Hapoel Eilat	4–0	
December	9–11	(Israel) Nadav Zilberstein	Ironi Nes Ziona	3–0	
January	12–16	(Israel) Guy Goodes	Maccabi Rishon LeZion	4–1	
February	17–19	(Israel) Oded Kattash	Hapoel Jerusalem	3–0	
March	20–24	(Israel) Rami Hadar	Hapoel Be'er Sheva	4–1	
April	24–29	(Israel) Sharon Drucker (2/2)	Hapoel Eilat	5–1	

=== MVP of the Round ===
Round	Player	Team	EFF	Ref.
October
1	(United States) Myke Henry (1/2)	Ironi Nahariya	27	
2	(United States) Taylor Braun	Hapoel Be'er Sheva	36	
3	(United States) Bryant Crawford (1/2)	Hapoel Gilboa Galil	28	
4	(United States) Ian Miller	Hapoel Gilboa Galil	34	
November
5	(United States) Bryant Crawford (2/2)	Hapoel Gilboa Galil	28	
7	(Mexico) Paul Stoll	Maccabi Ashdod	40	
8	(Dominican Republic) James Feldeine (1/2)	Hapoel Jerusalem	20	
December
9	(United States) Daequan Cook (1/2)	Ironi Nes Ziona	19	
10	(Israel) Tal Dunne	Ironi Nes Ziona	28	
January
12	(United States) JP Tokoto	Hapoel Eilat	45	
13	(United States) Corey Walden (1/4)	Hapoel Holon	35	
14	(United States) Corey Walden (2/4)	Hapoel Holon	46	
15	(Puerto Rico) Gary Browne	Ironi Nes Ziona	36	
February
17	(United States) James Kelly	Hapoel Gilboa Galil	31	
18	(United States) (Israel) Jake Pemberton	Maccabi Ashdod	31	
March
21	(United States) (Kosovo) Shawn Jones	Hapoel Holon	30	
22	(United States) Darion Atkins	Hapoel Holon	38	
23	(United States) Myke Henry (2/2)	Ironi Nahariya	28	
April
24	(United States) Corey Walden (3/4)	Hapoel Holon	36	
25	(United States) Daequan Cook (2/2)	Ironi Nes Ziona	29	
27	(United States) Greg Whittington	Hapoel Gilboa Galil	41	
28	(Canada) Xavier Rathan-Mayes	Bnei Herzliya	25	
29	(Dominican Republic) James Feldeine (2/2)	Hapoel Jerusalem	32	
May
30	(United States) Mark Tollefsen	Maccabi Ashdod	29	
31	(United States) Corey Walden (4/4)	Hapoel Holon	43	
32	(Israel) Amit Gershon	Hapoel Be'er Sheva	37	
33	(Israel) Nimrod Levi	Maccabi Ashdod	38	

== Israeli clubs in European competitions ==
Team	Competition	Progress
Maccabi Tel Aviv	EuroLeague	Regular season
Hapoel Jerusalem	Champions League	Quarter-finals
Hapoel Tel Aviv	Champions League	First qualifying round
Hapoel Holon	Champions League	Regular season
Hapoel Holon	FIBA Europe Cup	Semi-finals
Ironi Nes Ziona	FIBA Europe Cup	Round of 16

== See also ==
- 2018–19 Israeli Basketball National League
- 2018–19 Israeli Basketball State Cup
- 2018 Israeli Basketball League Cup
