= Ofer Berkovich =

Israeli basketball coach

Maccabi Ra'anana

Personal information
- Born: November 12, 1965 (age 61) Israel
- Coaching career: 1989–present

Ofer Berkovich (Hebrew: עופר ברקוביץ; born November 12, 1965) is an Israeli basketball coach who has coached in the Israeli Basketball Premier League and in the Israeli National League. He is currently the Coach of Maccabi Ra'anana.

== Biography ==
Berkovich was born in Israel. In the Israeli Basketball Premier League and in the Israeli National League he was: an Assistant Coach of Ironi Ramat Gan from 1989 to 1993 and 1999 to 2000, an Assistant Coach of Bnei Herzliya Basket in 1995, an Assistant Coach of Hapoel Eilat in 1996, Coach of Hapoel Holon in 2001, Coach of Maccabi Haifa in 2004, Coach of Elitzur Givat Shmuel from 2005 to 2007, Coach of Ironi Ashkelon in 2008, Coach of Maccabi Rishon LeZion from 2008 to 2009, Coach of Maccabi Ashdod from 2011 to 2013, Coach of Ironi Nes Ziona in 2016, Coach of Bnei Herzliya Basket in 2019, and Coach of Maccabi Ra'anana since 2020.
