= Gymnasia Realit =

Israeli high school

Coordinates: 31°57′41.14″N 34°47′50.15″E

Gimnasia Realit

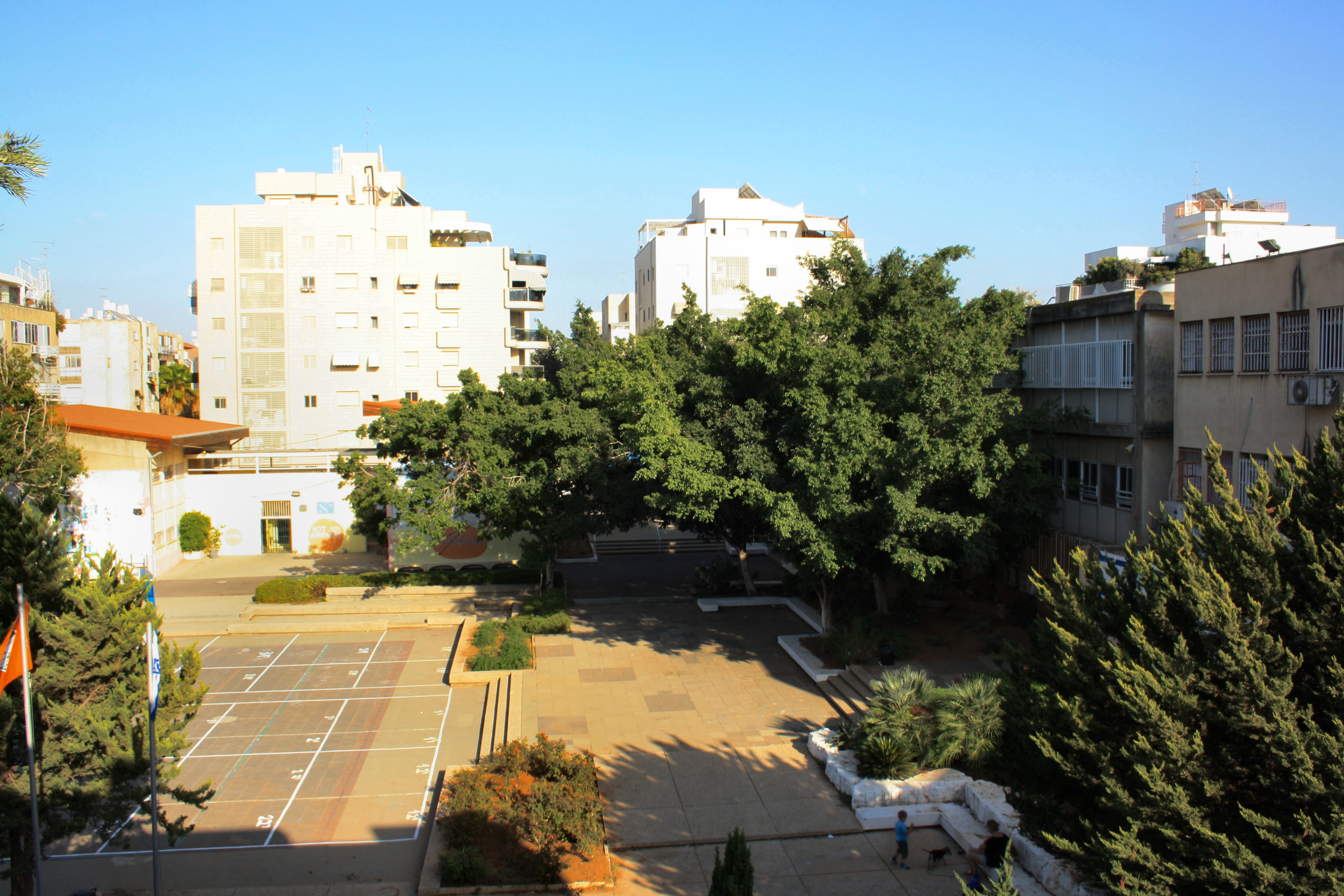
- Courtyard and building A

Location
- Rishon LeZion; Israel

Information
- Established: 1939
- Principal: Dalia Yeshaya

The Gimnasia Realit or the Gimnasia Realit E. Karary (הגימנסיה הריאלית על שם א. קררי) is an Israeli high school, named in honor of its first principal Eliezer Karary. In 2024, it was ranked the 11th best high school in Israel.

== History ==
It was established in 1939 in Rishon LeZion at the time of the 1936–39 Arab revolt during the Mandatory Palestine. It was the fifth high school in Israel and the first in Rishon LeZion. The school's first learning programs were devoted to humanities, in contrast with the present emphasis on the sciences, such as biotechnology and the TG (Talented and Gifted) classes. It merged with two middle schools in 2011 during a 40 million shekel rebuilding. The older school building was demolished before the merge.

The Gimnasia's first location was on Herzl street in a three-room apartment and only 9 students graduated in its first year. The second housing of the school was on Abrahmovich neighbourhood, until the last move to Smilchansky street, where it is located as of 2013.

== Principals ==
- Eliezer Karary - 1939-1970
- Gamliel Segal - 1970-1997
- Shosh Winter - 1997-2012
- Dalia Yeshaya - 2012-2018
- Iris Ron - 2018-current

== Notable alumni ==
- Tal Dunne (born 1987), Welsh-born Israeli professional basketball player for Ironi Nes Ziona
- Igor Nesterenko (born 1990), Israeli-Ukrainian basketball player in the Israel Basketball Premier League
