= Chinanu Onuaku =

American basketball player (born 1996)

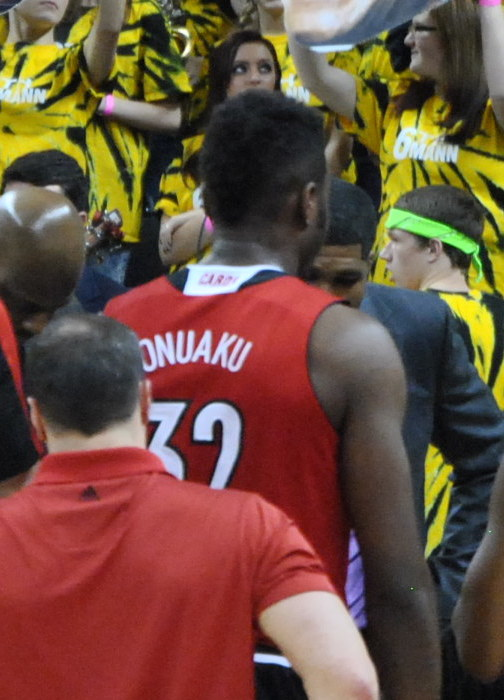
- Onuaku with the Louisville Cardinals

No. 32 – Kuwait SC
- Position: Center / power forward
- League: Kuwaiti Division I Basketball League

Personal information
- Born: November 1, 1996 (age 30) Lanham, Maryland, U.S.
- Listed height: 6 ft 10 in (2.08 m)
- Listed weight: 255 lb (116 kg)

Career information
- High school: Riverdale Baptist (Upper Marlboro, Maryland)
- College: Louisville (2014–2016)
- NBA draft: 2016: 2nd round, 37th overall pick
- Drafted by: Houston Rockets
- Playing career: 2016–present

Career history
- 2016–2018: Houston Rockets
- 2016–2018: →Rio Grande Valley Vipers
- 2018–2019: Greensboro Swarm
- 2019–2020: Wonju DB Promy
- 2020–2021: Zadar
- 2021–2022: Bnei Herzliya
- 2022: Dinamo Sassari
- 2022–2023: Hapoel Tel Aviv
- 2023: Joventut Badalona
- 2023–2024: Goyang Sono Skygunners
- 2024: Santeros de Aguada
- 2025: Bnei Herzliya
- 2026: Cangrejeros de Santurce
- 2026: Bnei Herzliya
- 2026–present: Kuwait SC

Career highlights
- Israeli Basketball Premier League MVP (2022); All-Israeli League First Team (2022); Israeli Basketball State Cup winner (2022); Israeli Basketball State Cup MVP (2022); Croatian League champion (2021); All-Croatian League First Team (2021); All-Croatian League All-Defensive Team (2021); Croatian Cup winner (2021); Croatian Cup MVP (2021); All-Korean League First Team (2020); Korean League All-Imports Team (2020)
- Stats at NBA.com
- Stats at Basketball Reference
Medals
Men's basketball
Representing the United States
FIBA U19 World Championship
Gold medal – first place	2015 Greece	Team

Chinanu Michael Onuaku (born November 1, 1996) is an American professional basketball player for Kuwait SC of the Kuwaiti Division I Basketball League. He played college basketball for the Louisville Cardinals. In 2021–22, he led the Israeli League in rebounds per game.

Onuaku is known for his use of underhand free throws, an unorthodox shooting technique most famously used by Rick Barry, one of the most accurate free throw shooters in NBA history. Underhand free throws are very rarely used in the modern NBA as many NBA players view the technique as embarrassing to use; the technique is often pejoratively referred to as "granny style". Onuaku found success by adopting this shooting method, increasing his free throw percentage from 46.7% his freshman year of college to 72.4% his rookie year.

== High school career ==
Onuaku attended Riverdale Baptist School where he averaged 12.4 points, 12.7 rebounds, and 5.5 blocks as a senior, leading Riverdale to a 30–9 record and the Capital Beltway conference title.

When Onuaku graduated, he was considered the 74th-best prospect by Rivals.com, 75th by ESPN and was rated as the seventh-best center in the nation by Scout.com.

== College career ==
Onuaku played two seasons of college basketball for the University of Louisville between 2014 and 2016. In his sophomore season, he averaged 9.9 points, 8.5 rebounds and 2.0 blocks, earning All-ACC Defensive Team and All-ACC honorable mention honors and posting 11 double-doubles.

In May 2016, Onuaku announced he would enter the NBA draft.

== Professional career ==
=== Houston Rockets (2016–2018) ===
On June 23, 2016, Onuaku was selected by the Houston Rockets with the 37th overall pick in the 2016 NBA draft and later joined them for the 2016 NBA Summer League. On July 20, 2016, he signed with the Rockets. He made his NBA debut on December 26, 2016, coming on in the fourth quarter and recording six points and three rebounds in a 131–115 win over the Phoenix Suns. He hit a pair of free throws in the game with his underhanded free-throw action. During his rookie season, Onuaku had multiple assignments with the Rio Grande Valley Vipers, the Rockets' D-League affiliate. On May 1, 2017, he was suspended two games without pay for pushing a game official. The incident occurred during an altercation in the final seconds of the Vipers' 122–96 loss to Raptors 905 in game 3 of the 2017 NBA D-League Finals on April 27.

On August 2, 2018, Onuaku was traded from the Rockets to the Dallas Mavericks for the rights to forward Maarty Leunen. He was waived four days later.

On September 4, 2018, Onuaku signed with the Portland Trail Blazers. On October 13, 2018, he was waived by the Trail Blazers.

=== Greensboro Swarm (2018–2019) ===
On October 20, 2018, Onuaku was selected with the second overall pick in the 2018 NBA G League draft by the Greensboro Swarm.

=== Wonju DB Promy (2019–2020) ===
On October 3, 2019, Onuaku signed with Wonju DB Promy of the Korean Basketball League to replace Elijah Thomas. He averaged 14.4 points, 10.3 rebounds, 2.5 assists, 1.4 steals and 1.5 blocks per game.

=== Zadar (2020–2021) ===
On October 14, 2020, Onuaku signed with Zadar in the Croatian League.

=== Bnei Herzliya (2021–2022) ===
On July 21, 2021, he signed with Bnei Herzliya of the Israeli Basketball Premier League. On February 17, 2022, Onuaku won the Israeli Basketball State Cup after Bnei Herzliya Basket edged out Hapoel Tel Aviv 87–82. Onuaku was crowned as the game's MVP with 30 points, 17 rebounds, 4 assists, 4 blocks and a 50 PIR. For the 2021–22 season, he led the league in rebounds, averaging 9.9 per game.

=== Dinamo Sassari (2022) ===
On July 20, 2022, he signed with Dinamo Sassari of the Italian Lega Basket Serie A (LBA).

=== Hapoel Tel Aviv (2022–2023) ===
On November 13, 2022, he signed with Hapoel Tel Aviv of the Israeli Basketball Premier League.

=== Joventut Badalona (2023) ===
On July 27, 2023, Onuaku signed with Joventut Badalona of the Spanish Liga ACB.

=== Goyang Sono Skygunners (2023–2024) ===
On November 13, 2023, Onuaku joined the Goyang Sono Skygunners of the Korean Basketball League (KBL) to replace Jarrod Jones.

=== Santeros de Aguada (2024) ===
On March 21, 2024, Onuaku signed with the Santeros de Aguada of the Baloncesto Superior Nacional.

=== Second stint with the Wonju DB Promy (2024–2025) ===
On June 27, 2024, Onuaku signed with the Wonju DB Promy of the Korean Basketball League (KBL).

=== Return to Bnei Herzliya (2025) ===
On April 14, 2025, he signed with Bnei Herzliya of the Israeli Basketball Premier League.

=== Cangrejeros de Santurce (2026-present) ===
On May 6, 2026, he signed with the Cangrejeros de Santurce of the Baloncesto Superior Nacional.

== NBA career statistics ==
Legend
GP	Games played	GS	Games started	MPG	Minutes per game
FG%	Field goal percentage	3P%	3-point field goal percentage	FT%	Free throw percentage
RPG	Rebounds per game	APG	Assists per game	SPG	Steals per game
BPG	Blocks per game	PPG	Points per game	**Bold**	Career high

=== Regular season ===
Year	Team	GP	GS	MPG	FG%	3P%	FT%	RPG	APG	SPG	BPG	PPG
2016–17	Houston	**5**	**1**	10.4	**.714**	-	**1.000**	2.0	.6	**.6**	**.2**	2.8
2017–18	Houston	1	0	**22.0**	.400	-	-	**4.0**	**1.0**	.0	.0	**4.0**
Career		6	1	12.3	.583	-	1.000	2.3	.7	.5	.2	3.0

=== Playoffs ===
Year	Team	GP	GS	MPG	FG%	3P%	FT%	RPG	APG	SPG	BPG	PPG
2018	Houston	1	0	3.0	-	-	-	1.0	1.0	1.0	.0	.0
Career		1	0	3.0	-	-	-	1.0	1.0	1.0	.0	.0

== Personal life ==
Onuaku is the son of Nwaneka and Christopher Onuaku, and has three older siblings: Ify, Arinze and Chuk. Onuaku's brother, Arinze, is also a professional basketball player.
