= Tal Dunne =

Israeli basketball player (born 1987)

Tal Dunne טל דן
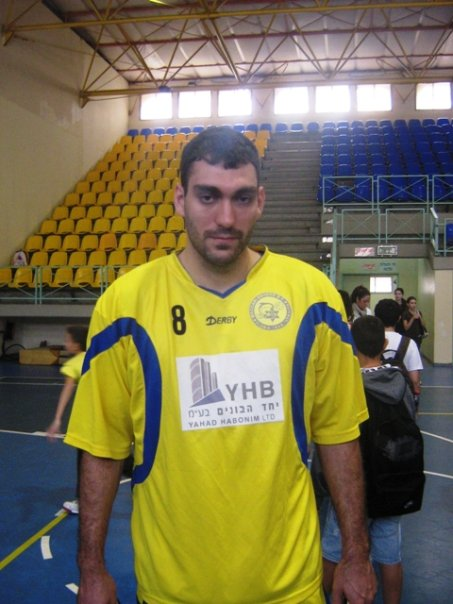
- Dunne with Maccabi Ashdod in 2010

Personal information
- Born: 25 February 1987 (age 39) Aberystwyth, Wales
- Listed height: 1.98 m (6 ft 6 in)

Career information
- High school: Gymnasia Realit (Rishon LeZion)
- NBA draft: 2009: undrafted
- Playing career: 2005–2022
- Position: Small forward
- Number: 6

Career history
- 2005–2008: Maccabi Rishon LeZion
- 2006–2007: →Maccabi Ashdod
- 2008–2009: Ironi Ness Ziona
- 2009–2010: Ironi Ashkelon
- 2010: Maccabi Ashdod
- 2010–2011: Hapoel Afula
- 2011–2022: Ironi Ness Ziona

Career highlights
- FIBA Europe Cup champion (2021); All-Israeli Premier League Second Team (2019); Israeli Premier League All-Star (2019); 2× Israeli National League champion (2013, 2017); Israeli National League Finals MVP (2013); Israeli National League All-Star (2013)

Tal Michael Dunne (Hebrew: טל דן; born 25 February 1987) is a Welsh-born Irish-Israeli former professional basketball player. He spent his entire professional playing career in the Israeli Basketball Premier League.

== Early life ==
Dunne was born in Aberystwyth, Wales to an Irish father and Israeli mother. Dunne lived his first 2 years in the United Kingdom, before he moved to Israel to grow up in the city of Ness Ziona. He played for Maccabi Rishon LeZion youth team and the Gymnasia Realit high school team.

== Professional career ==
=== Early years (2005–2011) ===
In 2005, Dunne started his professional career with Maccabi Rishon LeZion. On 23 October 2005, he made his professional debut in a match against Maccabi Haifa.

In 2006, Dunne was loaned to Maccabi Ashdod of the Liga Leumit. In 17 games played for Ashdod, Dunne averaged 16.1 points and 3.6 rebounds per game.

On 14 February 2010 Dunne returned to Maccabi Ashdod for a second stint, signing for the rest of the season.

On 31 August 2010 Dunne signed with Hapoel Afula for the 2010–11 season.

=== Ironi Nes Ziona (2011–2022) ===
On 20 October 2011 Dunne returned to Ironi Nes Ziona for a second stint. In his second season with Nes Ziona, Dunne helped them to promote to the Israeli Basketball Premier League for the first time in their history. He was named Finals MVP. In 23 games played during the 2012–13 season, Dunne averaged 18.2 points, 6.3 rebounds and 3.7 assists per game.

On 4 July 2013 Dunne signed a two-year contract extension with Nes Ziona.

On 24 November 2014 Dunne recorded a career-high 29 points, shooting 12-of-19 from the field, along with six rebounds and six assists in an 87–83 win over Ironi Nahariya.

On 22 June 2016 Dunne signed a three-year contract extension with Nes Ziona. That season, Dunne helped Nes Ziona to promote to the Premier League after they swept Hapoel Be'er Sheva 3–0 in the best-of-five series.

In his seventh season with Nes Ziona, Dunne helped them to reach the 2018 Israeli League Playoffs, where they eventually lost to Maccabi Tel Aviv.

On 15 December 2018 Dunne recorded a season-high 20 points, shooting 9-of-14 from the field, along with eight rebounds, six assists and two steals, leading Nes Ziona to an 88–78 win over Hapoel Holon. He was subsequently named Israeli League Round 10 MVP. On 1 January 2019 Dunne was named Israeli League Player of the Month after averaging 14.3 points, 8.7 rebounds and 6.3 assists in three games played in December.

On 1 July 2019 Dunne signed a two-year contract extension with Nes Ziona.

== Israel national team ==
Dunne was a member of the Israeli U-18 and U-20 national teams.
