= Myke Henry =

American basketball player (born 1992)

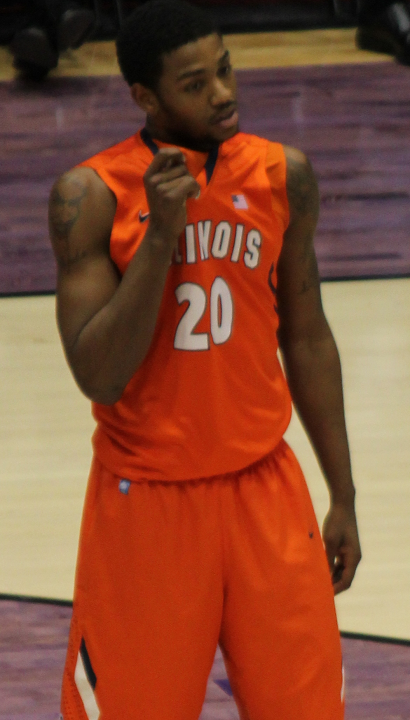
- Henry playing for Illinois in 2012

Free agent
- Position: Shooting guard / small forward

Personal information
- Born: December 23, 1992 (age 33) Chicago, Illinois, U.S.
- Listed height: 6 ft 6 in (1.98 m)
- Listed weight: 238 lb (108 kg)

Career information
- High school: Orr Academy (Chicago, Illinois)
- College: Illinois (2011–2013); DePaul (2014–2016)
- NBA draft: 2016: undrafted
- Playing career: 2016–present

Career history
- 2016–2017: Oklahoma City Blue
- 2017: Rayos de Hermosillo
- 2017–2018: Oklahoma City Blue
- 2018: Memphis Grizzlies
- 2018: →Memphis Hustle
- 2018–2019: Ironi Nahariya
- 2019–2020: Oklahoma City Blue
- 2020–2021: Trieste
- 2021–2022: Champagne Châlons-Reims
- 2022: Iraklis Thessaloniki
- 2022: Scafati Basket
- 2022–2023: Astoria Bydgoszcz
- 2023: Libertadores de Querétaro
- 2024: Satria Muda Pertamina
- 2024: NLEX Road Warriors

Career highlights
- Israeli League All-Star (2019)
- Stats at NBA.com
- Stats at Basketball Reference
Medals
Men's 3x3 basketball
Representing the United States
FIBA 3x3 World Cup
Silver medal – second place	2016 Guangzhou

Mycheal Gerome Henry (born December 23, 1992) is an American professional basketball player who last played for NLEX Road Warriors of the Philippine Basketball Association (PBA). He played college basketball for Illinois and DePaul University.

== College career ==
Henry began his college career at University of Illinois where he was recruited by Bruce Weber. After his freshman year Weber was fired, and new head coach John Groce used Henry sparingly as a sophomore which contributed to his decision to transfer to DePaul.

At DePaul, Henry scored a career high 29 points against Stanford on November 30, 2014.

== Professional career ==
=== 2016–17 season ===
After going undrafted in the 2016 NBA draft, Henry signed with Oklahoma City Blue of the NBA G League for the 2016–17 season. On May 3, 2017, After appearing in 39 games with the Oklahoma City Blue, Henry signed with Rayos de Hermosillo of the CIBACOPA league in Northwestern Mexico.

=== 2017–18 season ===
On October 23, 2017, Henry returned to the Oklahoma City Blue for the 2017–18 NBA G League season. On January 13, 2018, Henry signed a two-way contract with the Memphis Grizzlies. On July 20, 2018, the Grizzlies waived Henry.

=== 2018–19 season ===
On July 23, 2018, Henry signed a one-year deal with Ironi Nahariya of the Israeli Premier League. On October 7, 2018, Henry recorded 31 points in his first game with Nahariya, he shot 11-of-17 from the field, along with three rebounds in a 98–95 win over Hapoel Holon. He was subsequently named Israeli League Round 1 MVP. On March 23, 2019, Henry recorded a double-double of 18 points and 11 rebounds, along with three blocks and three assists in a 88–77 win over Hapoel Holon. He was subsequently named Israeli League Round 23 MVP. In 33 games played for Nahariya, he averaged 14.3 points, 5.8 rebounds, 2.1 assists and 1.5 steals per game.

=== 2019–20 season ===
On September 30, 2019, Henry signed with the Oklahoma City Thunder. He later joined their G League affiliate, the Oklahoma City Blue. On December 28, 2019, Henry accumulated 24 points, nine rebounds, two steals, two blocks and one assist in a 112–89 victory over the Sioux Falls Skyforce. He missed a game with a foot injury in January 2020. Henry averaged 13.4 points, 5.4 rebounds and 1.8 assists per game.

=== 2020–21 season ===
On July 11, 2020, Henry signed with Pallacanestro Trieste of the Italian Lega Basket Serie A (LBA).

=== 2021–22 season ===
On July 16, 2021, Henry signed with Champagne Châlons-Reims of the French LNB Pro A. He averaged 12.6 points per game, but was waived on January 8, 2022.

On January 28, 2022, Henry signed with Iraklis Thessaloniki of the Greek Basket League. In 12 games, he averaged 15.4 points, 6.4 rebounds, 2.2 assists and 1.4 steals in 27 minutes per contest.

=== 2022–23 season ===
On July 2, 2022, he signed with Scafati Basket of the Lega Basket Serie A.

On December 1, 2022, he signed with Astoria Bydgoszcz of the Polish Basketball League (PLK).

=== 2024 season ===
On July 17, 2024, he signed with NLEX Road Warriors of the Philippine Basketball Association (PBA) as the team's import for the 2024 PBA Governors' Cup.

== International career ==
Henry joined a Chicago-based 3x3 basketball team composed of Stefhon Hannah, Kavon Lytch, and Alfonzo McKinnie who went undefeated in the 2016 USA Basketball 3x3 National Championship that was played Aug. 27–28 at the United States Olympic Training Center in Colorado Springs, Colorado. The team represented the United States at the 2016 FIBA 3x3 World Championship in Guangzhou, China and won the silver medal.

== Personal life ==
When Henry was 17 years old, his 15-year-old brother DJ was shot and killed as an innocent bystander to gang violence.

== Career statistics ==
Legend
GP	Games played	GS	Games started	MPG	Minutes per game
FG%	Field goal percentage	3P%	3-point field goal percentage	FT%	Free throw percentage
RPG	Rebounds per game	APG	Assists per game	SPG	Steals per game
BPG	Blocks per game	PPG	Points per game	**Bold**	Career high

=== NBA ===
==== Regular season ====
Year	Team	GP	GS	MPG	FG%	3P%	FT%	RPG	APG	SPG	BPG	PPG
2017–18	Memphis	20	0	18.9	.376	.328	.600	1.9	1.1	1.5	.3	5.3
Career		20	0	18.9	.376	.328	.600	1.9	1.1	1.5	.3	5.3
