= Amit Gershon =

Israeli basketball player (born 1995)

Amit Gershon עמית גרשון
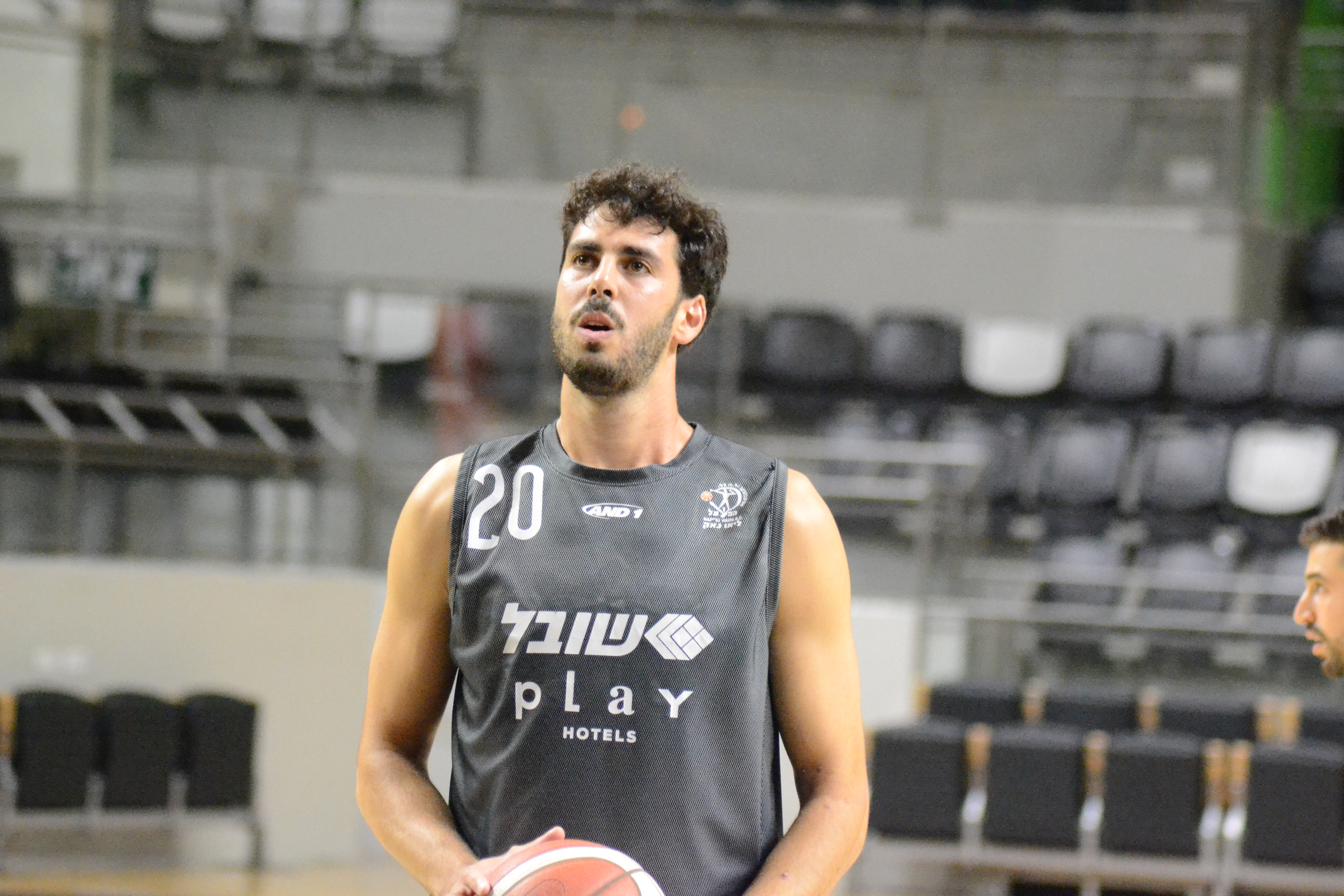

No. 20 – Bnei Herzliya
- Position: Shooting guard
- League: Israeli Basketball Premier League

Personal information
- Born: December 5, 1995 (age 30) Hadera, Israel
- Listed height: 1.91 m (6 ft 3 in)

Career information
- NBA draft: 2017: undrafted
- Playing career: 2014–present

Career history
- 2014–2017: Hapoel Afula
- 2017–2019: Hapoel Be'er Sheva
- 2019–2021: Hapoel Gilboa Galil
- 2021–2022: Hapoel Jerusalem
- 2022–2023: Hapoel Eilat
- 2023–2025: Hapoel Haifa
- 2025: Hapoel Be'er Sheva
- 2025–2026: Elitzur Netanya
- 2026–present: Bnei Herzliya

Career highlights
- Israeli League Premier Rising Star (2019); Israeli National League champion (2018)

Amit Gershon (Hebrew: עמית גרשון; born December 5, 1995) is an Israeli professional basketball player for Bnei Herzliya of the Israeli Basketball Premier League. Standing at 6 ft 3 in (1.91 m), Gershon is known as a three-point specialist. He was named the Israeli League Rising Star in 2019.

== Early life ==
Gershon was born in Hadera, Israel. He played for Maccabi Hadera and Hapoel Emek Yizra'el youth teams.

== Professional career ==
=== Hapoel Afula (2014–2017) ===
In 2014, Gershon started his professional career with Hapoel Afula of the Israeli National League. He played three seasons with Afula, averaging 9.4 points, 2.8 assists and 2.7 rebounds per game while shooting 40.9 percent from three-point range in his last season with the team.

=== Hapoel Be'er Sheva (2017–2019) ===
On July 2, 2017, Gershon signed with Hapoel Be'er Sheva, signing a two-year deal. In 37 games played during the 2017–18 season, he averaged 8.9 points and 2.4 rebounds per game, while shooting 40.7 percent from three-point range. Gershon helped Be'er Sheva win the Israeli National League championship, earning a promotion to the Premier League for the first time in their history.

On May 15, 2019, Gershon recorded a career-high 32 points, shooting 9-of-12 from three-point range, along with four rebounds and four assists for 37 PIR, leading Be'er Sheva to a 104–77 win over Hapoel Gilboa Galil. He was subsequently named Israeli League Round 32 MVP. On June 7, 2019, Gershon was named the Israeli League Rising Star.

=== Hapoel Gilboa Galil (2019–2021) ===
On June 25, 2019, Gershon signed with Hapoel Gilboa Galil for the 2019–20 season.

=== Hapoel Jerusalem (2021–2022) ===
On July 26, 2021, Gershon signed with Hapoel Jerusalem.

=== Hapoel Eilat (2022–2023) ===
On July 25, 2022, he has signed with Hapoel Eilat of the Israeli Basketball Premier League.

== National team career ==
Gershon was a member of the U-20 Israeli national team in the 2015 FIBA Europe Under-20 Championship. He also participated in the 2017 Summer Universiade.
