= Greg Whittington =

American basketball player

Free agent
- Position: Power forward

Personal information
- Born: February 17, 1993 (age 33) (Note: Some sources list him as being born on February 7, 1993, while others state he was born on February 17, 1993.) Columbia, Maryland, U.S.
- Listed height: 6 ft 8 in (2.03 m)
- Listed weight: 210 lb (95 kg)

Career information
- High school: Oakland Mills (Columbia, Maryland)
- College: Georgetown (2011–2013)
- NBA draft: 2015: undrafted
- Playing career: 2015–present

Career history
- 2015–2016: Sioux Falls Skyforce
- 2016–2017: Sydney Kings
- 2017: Sioux Falls Skyforce
- 2017–2018: Levanga Hokkaido
- 2018–2019: Hapoel Gilboa Galil
- 2019–2020: Galatasaray Doğa Sigorta
- 2020–2021: Denver Nuggets
- 2021–2022: Lokomotiv Kuban
- 2022–2023: Hapoel Be'er Sheva
- 2023–2024: Palencia
- 2024: VEF Rīga
- 2024: Santeros de Aguada
- 2024: Metros de Santiago
- 2025–2026: Halcones de Ciudad Obregón
- 2025: Peñarol

Career highlights
- LBL champion (2024); Latvian Cup winner (2024); Latvian Cup Final MVP (2024); NBA D-League champion (2016); NBA D-League All-Rookie Team (2016); Israeli League Rebounding Leader (2019); Israeli League All-Star (2019)
- Stats at NBA.com
- Stats at Basketball Reference

Gregory Vernon Whittington (born February 17, 1993) is an American professional basketball player. After a tumultuous college career with Georgetown, Whittington began his professional career by helping the Sioux Falls Skyforce win the 2016 NBA D-League championship. He went on to play in Australia, Japan, Israel, Turkey, Russia and Spain. He made his NBA debut in 2021 with the Denver Nuggets.

== High school career ==
Whittington attended Oakland Mills High School in Columbia, Maryland where he was a four-year letterwinner playing for the basketball team. As a senior in 2010–11, he averaged 23.5 points, 11.6 rebounds, 4.4 blocks, 3.0 steals and 2.7 assists per game, while earning All-Met Player of the Year and Howard County Player of the Year honors for leading his team to an undefeated season, finishing 25–0.

== College career ==
As a freshman at Georgetown in 2011–12, Whittington appeared in all 33 games while averaging 4.3 points and 2.9 rebounds in 20.1 minutes per game. His sophomore season was cut short in January 2013 after being suspended for academic deficiencies. He averaged 12.1 points and 7.0 rebounds in 13 games.

Whittington failed to appear in any games for the Hoyas in the 2013–14 season due to a torn ACL suffered during the summer, as he was dismissed from the team on November 30, 2013. He subsequently transferred to Rutgers University, only to go back on his commitment by not enrolling for the spring semester with no comment given on his decision not to join the school. Whittington subsequently sat out the entire 2013–14 season.

== Professional career ==
=== Sioux Falls Skyforce (2015–2016) ===
Whittington sat out the entire 2014–15 season while still recovering from his ACL injury. He spent time working out with the Westchester Knicks of the NBA Development League.

In May and June 2015, Whittington took part in pre-draft workouts with the Indiana Pacers and the Boston Celtics. He ultimately went undrafted in the 2015 NBA draft and joined the Miami Heat for the 2015 NBA Summer League, playing in both Orlando and Las Vegas. In nine games, he averaged 9.1 points, 6.2 rebounds, 2.0 assists, 1.4 steals and 1.3 blocks per game. He later joined the Heat for training camp and appeared in four preseason games.

On November 2, 2015, Whittington was acquired by the Sioux Falls Skyforce of the NBA Development League as an affiliate player of the Heat. He appeared in all 10 games for the Skyforce to begin the season, helping them to a 7–3 record while averaging 15.2 points, 9.3 rebounds, 2.4 assists and 2.4 steals per game. However, a hand injury suffered in mid-December saw him miss two months of action. The Skyforce finished the regular season with a league-best 40–10 record, going on to reach the D-League Finals, where they defeated the Los Angeles D-Fenders 2–1 to claim their first D-League championship. In game two, Whittington scored a team-high 17 points. In 34 games (27 regular season, 7 playoff) for the Skyforce in 2015–16, he averaged 13.5 points, 7.6 rebounds, 2.4 assists, 1.9 steals and 1.0 blocks per game. At the season's end, he earned NBA D-League All-Rookie Team honors.

In the 2016 off-season, Whittington decided against participating in Summer League activities and instead went home to Maryland to work out with his local counterparts. Such players included NBA stars Victor Oladipo and Jerami Grant.

=== Sydney Kings (2016–2017) ===
On August 13, 2016, Whittington signed with the Sydney Kings for the 2016–17 NBL season. He made his debut for the Kings in their season opener on October 8, 2016, but struggled to make an impact offensively in 24 minutes due to foul trouble. He finished with six points, four rebounds, two assists, two steals and three blocks in a 77–73 loss to the Brisbane Bullets. In the Kings' fourth game of the season on October 20, Whittington scored a season-high 22 points in a 92–78 win over the New Zealand Breakers. On November 5, he had a season-high 16 rebounds in a 64–57 loss to the Cairns Taipans. He appeared in all 28 games for the Kings and averaged 11.5 points, 6.4 rebounds, 1.8 assists and 1.5 steals per game. The Kings missed the playoffs in 2016–17 with a 13–15 record.

=== Return to the Skyforce (2017) ===
On February 21, 2017, Whittington was reacquired by the Sioux Falls Skyforce. In nine games for the Skyforce to finish the 2016–17 season, he averaged 13.6 points, 5.7 rebounds, 2.0 assists and 1.0 steals per game.

=== Levanga Hokkaido (2017–2018) ===
On July 28, 2017, Whittington signed with Levanga Hokkaido of the Japanese B.League. He left the team in January 2018 after averaging 11.0 points, 6.1 rebounds and 1.8 assists in 18 games.

=== Hapoel Gilboa Galil (2018–2019) ===
On September 20, 2018, Whittington signed a one-year deal with Hapoel Gilboa Galil of the Israeli Premier League. On April 15, 2019, Whittington recorded a career-high 29 points, shooting 10-of-17 from the field, along with 14 rebounds, 5 assists and 2 blocks in a 96–93 win over Ironi Nahariya. He was subsequently named Israeli League Round 27 MVP. In 30 games played for Gilboa Gali, he led the league in efficiency rating (24.6) and rebounds (9.6). He also finished as the third-leading scorer (18.4), while shooting 41.5 percent from three-point range.

=== Galatasaray Doğa Sigorta (2019–2020) ===
On August 12, 2019, Whittington signed with Galatasaray Doğa Sigorta of the Basketbol Süper Ligi. He left the team in January 2020. In 14 league games, he averaged 12.4 points, 4.9 rebounds, 1.6 assists and 1.0 steals per game. He also averaged 12.5 points, 6.4 rebounds, 1.5 assists and 1.3 steals in 11 Eurocup games.

=== Denver Nuggets (2020–2021) ===
On November 24, 2020, Whittington signed a two-way contract with the Denver Nuggets. On April 9, 2021, he was waived after making four appearances.

=== Lokomotiv Kuban (2021–2022) ===
On June 30, 2021, Whittington signed with Russian team Lokomotiv Kuban of the VTB United League. He left the team as a result of the 2022 Russian invasion of Ukraine.

=== Hapoel Be'er Sheva (2022–2023) ===
On November 8, 2022, Whittington signed with Hapoel Be'er Sheva of the Israeli Basketball Premier League.

=== Palencia (2023–2024) ===
In October 2023, Whittington signed with Palencia of the Liga ACB.

=== VEF Rīga (2024) ===
On January 19, 2024, Whittington signed with VEF Rīga of the Latvian–Estonian Basketball League. He helped the team win the Latvian Cup and was named the most valuable player of the final match. The team went on to win the LBL championship.

=== Santeros de Aguada (2024) ===
In June 2024, Whittington joined Santeros de Aguada of the Baloncesto Superior Nacional.

=== Santeros de Aguada (2024) ===
In July 2024, Whittington joined Metros de Santiago of the Liga Nacional de Baloncesto.

=== Halcones de Ciudad Obregón and Peñarol (2025–2026) ===
After initially signing in Lithuania with BC Šiauliai in January 2025, Whittington joined Halcones de Ciudad Obregón of the Mexican CIBACOPA in March 2025. In 43 CIBACOPA games, he averaged 15.2 points, 7.1 rebounds, 2.5 assists and 1.2 steals per game.

In October 2025, Whittington joined Peñarol of the Liga Uruguaya de Básquetbol. He appeared in seven games between October 13 and November 11.

In February 2026, Whittington re-joined Obregón, where he played six CIBACOPA games between February 16 and February 25.

== Career statistics ==
Legend
GP	Games played	GS	Games started	MPG	Minutes per game
FG%	Field goal percentage	3P%	3-point field goal percentage	FT%	Free throw percentage
RPG	Rebounds per game	APG	Assists per game	SPG	Steals per game
BPG	Blocks per game	PPG	Points per game	**Bold**	Career high

=== NBA ===
==== Regular season ====
Year	Team	GP	GS	MPG	FG%	3P%	FT%	RPG	APG	SPG	BPG	PPG
2020–21	Denver	4	0	3.0	.000	.000	.000	.0	.0	.0	.0	.0
Career		4	0	3.0	.000	.000	.000	.0	.0	.0	.0	.0

== Personal life ==
He is the son of the late Gregory and Jana Lisa Whittington, and has an older sister, Hana, and a younger brother, Cortez. His father died in 2016 after a long battle with cancer.
