= Corey Walden =

American basketball player (born 1992)

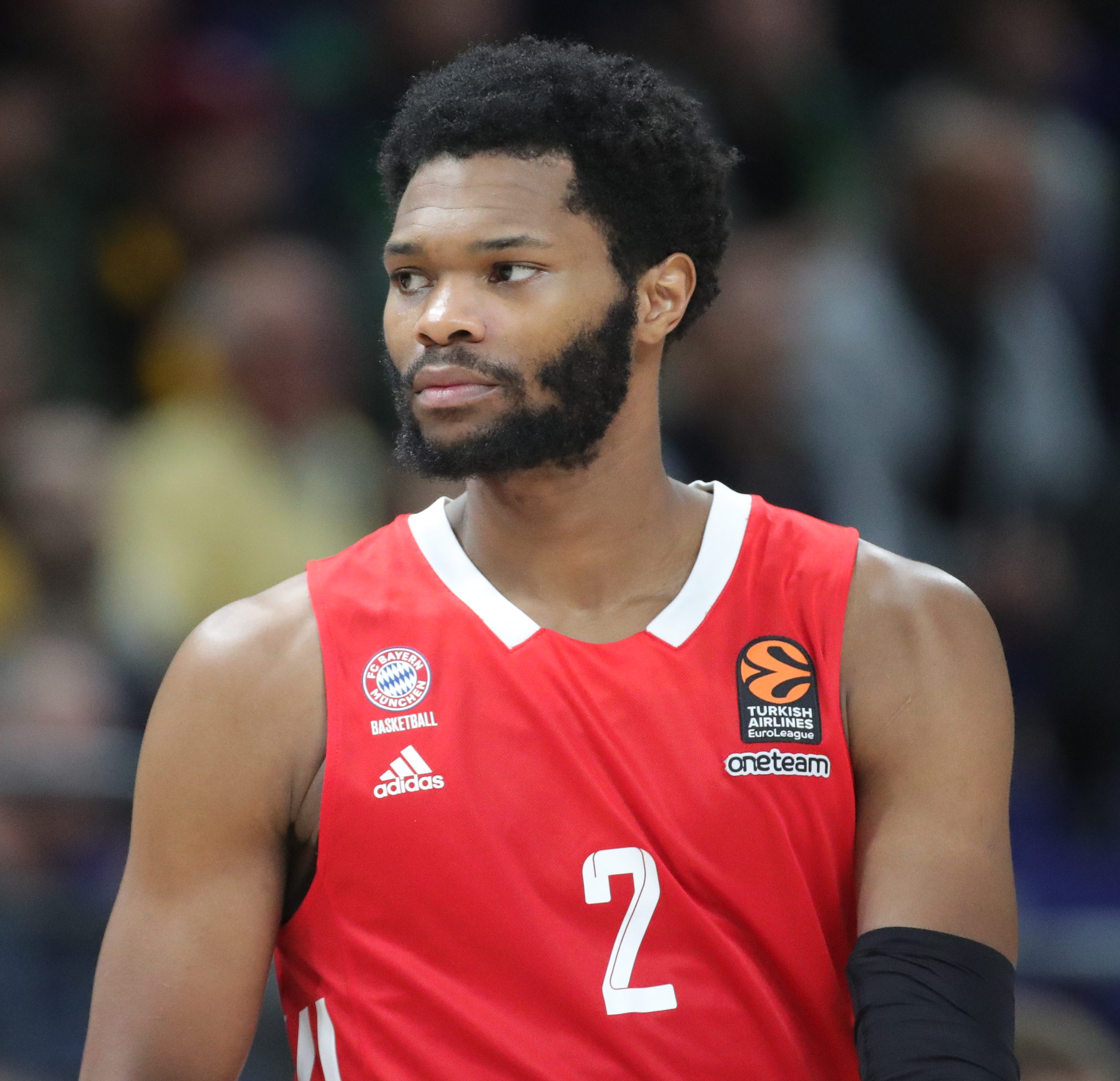
- Walden with Bayern Munich in 2022

Free agent
- Position: Point guard / shooting guard

Personal information
- Born: August 5, 1992 (age 34) Ormond Beach, Florida, U.S.
- Listed height: 6 ft 2 in (1.88 m)
- Listed weight: 190 lb (86 kg)

Career information
- High school: Seabreeze (Daytona Beach, Florida)
- College: Stetson (2010–2011); Eastern Kentucky (2012–2015)
- NBA draft: 2015: undrafted
- Playing career: 2015–present

Career history
- 2015–2016: Maine Red Claws
- 2016–2017: Telenet Oostende
- 2017–2019: Hapoel Holon
- 2019–2020: Partizan
- 2020–2021: Crvena zvezda
- 2021–2023: Bayern Munich
- 2023–2024: Galatasaray
- 2024–2026: Força Lleida

Career highlights
- ABA League champion (2021); Serbian League champion (2021); Belgian League champion (2017); Serbian Cup winner (2020); ABA League Supercup winner (2019); Israeli Cup winner (2018); Belgian Cup winner (2017); Israeli League MVP (2019); All-Israeli League First Team (2019); Israeli League All-Star (2019); NCAA steals leader (2015); First-team All-OVC (2015); 2× OVC Defensive Player of the Year (2014, 2015); OVC tournament MVP (2014); OVC All-Newcomer Team (2013); A-Sun All-Freshmen Team (2011)
- Stats at Basketball Reference

Torrian Corey Walden (born August 5, 1992) is an American professional basketball player. He played college basketball for Stetson and Eastern Kentucky before playing professionally in the NBA G League, Belgium and Israel. Standing at 6 ft 2 in (1.88 m), he plays at the point guard position. Playing for Hapoel Holon, he was named the 2019 Israeli Basketball Premier League MVP. In addition to being a citizen of the United States, Walden also has Serbian citizenship.

== High school career ==
Walden attended Seabreeze High School in Daytona Beach, Florida where he hit an area-high 57 three-pointers and averaged 28.4 points and four steals per game as a senior, earning four varsity letters in basketball and also back-to-back Volusia County Player of the Year awards as a junior and senior. When he graduated, he was the all-time leading scorer at Seabreeze with 1,647 points and the all-time leader in steals. Among his best performances was the 2008–09 regional finals where he scored 38 points against Melbourne High.

== College career ==
Walden began his college career with Stetson where he started all 24 games he appeared in and averaged 12.0 points, 3.3 rebounds, 3.3 assists and 2.3 steals per game and subsequently earned 2011 Atlantic Sun Conference All-Freshman Team honors. Following the 2010–11 season, he transferred to Eastern Florida State but didn't play during the 2011–12 season due to an injury.

After redshirting on his sophomore season, Walden transferred to Eastern Kentucky where he spent his last three college years. In the 2014 OVC Tournament, he averaged 23.3 points, 3.7 steals while shooting 66 percent from the field and was named MVP. However, foul trouble limited his play as a junior. He moved to point guard at the beginning of his senior year. As a senior, he averaged 18.6 points, 4.0 rebounds, 3.8 assists and 3.1 steals in 34.6 minutes per game earning a spot on the Lou Henson All-America Team and the first team All-Ohio Valley Conference for the 2014–15 season.

== Professional career ==
=== Maine Red Claws (2015–2016) ===
After going undrafted on the 2015 NBA draft, Walden joined the Boston Celtics for the 2015 NBA Summer League where he averaged 2.0 points, 2.5 rebounds, 2.5 assists and 3.5 steals in 16.5 minutes per game. On September 25, 2015, he signed with the Celtics, only to be waived by the team on October 24 after appearing in four preseason games. On October 31, he was acquired by the Maine Red Claws of the NBA Development League as an affiliate player of the Celtics. Walden joined the Boston Celtics again for the 2016 NBA Summer League.

=== Telenet Oostende (2016–2017) ===
On July 17, 2016, Walden signed with Belgian team Telenet Oostende. On March 15, 2017, Walden recorded a season-high 25 points, shooting 10-of-11 from the field, along with six rebounds, four assists and two steals in a 95–79 win over Enisey. In 65 games played during the 2016–17 season, he averaged 9.4 points, 2.2 rebounds, 2.1 assists and 1.1 steals in 20.5 minutes per game. Walden went on to win the 2017 Belgian Cup and the 2017 Belgian League championship titles with Oostende.

=== Hapoel Holon (2017–2019) ===
==== 2017–18 season ====
On July 26, 2017, Walden signed with Israeli team Hapoel Holon for the 2017–18 season. On December 5, 2017, Walden recorded a season-high 31 points, shooting 9-for-13 from the field in a 94–90 win over EWE Baskets Oldenburg. Three days later, Walden was named Champions League Game Day 7 MVP. In 32 games played during the 2017–18 season, he averaged 10.4 points, 3 rebounds, 2.6 assists and 1.8 steals per game. Walden went on to win the 2018 Israeli State Cup with Holon, as well as reaching the 2018 Israeli League Final, where they eventually lost to Maccabi Tel Aviv.

==== 2018–19 season ====
On July 11, 2018, Walden signed a one-year contract extension with Hapoel Holon. On January 12, 2019, Walden recorded a then career-high 32 points, shooting 11-of-15 from the field, along with four rebounds, seven assists and two steals for 46 PIR, leading Holon to an 82–76 win over Hapoel Eilat. On January 31, 2019, Walden was named Israeli League Player of the Month after averaging 24.8 points, 7.3 assists, 4.3 rebounds and 2.5 steals per game in four games played in January. On May 13, 2019, Walden recorded a career-high 37 points, shooting 13-of-20 from the field, along with six assists in a 105–102 win over Maccabi Rishon LeZion.

Walden led Holon to the 2019 Israeli League Playoffs, where they eventually lost in four games to Maccabi Rishon LeZion in the Quarterfinals. In 35 Israeli League games played during the 2018–19 season, he averaged 18.4 points, 3.6 rebounds, 5 assists and 1.2 steals, shooting 40.9 percent from three-point range. Walden was named four-time Israeli League Round MVP, All-Israeli League First Team and the Regular Season MVP.

=== Serbia (2019–2021) ===
On July 1, 2019, Walden joined the Toronto Raptors for the 2019 NBA Summer League. On July 24, 2019, Walden signed a two-year deal with the Partizan of the ABA League and the EuroCup. He averaged 8.9 points, 3.6 boards and 1.8 assists per game. He parted ways with Partizan on June 27, 2020.

On July 2, 2020, Walden officially signed a two-year deal Crvena zvezda of the ABA League. On February 1, 2021, Walden obtained a Serbian passport and Serbian citizenship. He parted ways with the team on July 14, 2021.

=== Germany (2021–2023) ===
On July 30, 2021, Walden signed a two-year deal with Bayern Munich of the Basketball Bundesliga.

=== Galatasaray (2023–2024) ===
On 10 July 2023 he signed with Galatasaray Ekmas of the Basketball Super League (BSL).

== Personal life ==
The son of Clayton and Lawana, Walden graduated with a Bachelors of Science in Sports Management in 2017.
