= Igor Nesterenko =

Israeli-Ukrainian basketball player

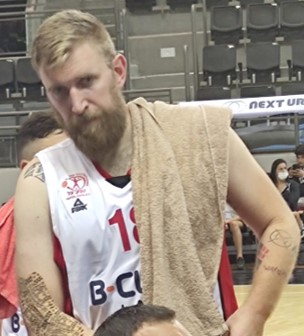
- Nesterenko

Personal information
- Born: August 18, 1990 (age 36) Kiliya, Ukraine
- Listed height: 2.04 m (6 ft 8 in)
- Listed weight: 100 kg (220 lb)

Career information
- High school: Gymnasia Realit (Rishon LeZion)
- NBA draft: 2012: undrafted
- Playing career: 2008–2023
- Position: Center

Career history
- 2008–2015: Maccabi Rishon LeZion
- 2012–2013: → Elitzur Yavne
- 2015–2016: Ironi Nes Ziona
- 2016–2019: Ironi Nahariya
- 2019–2022: Hapoel Haifa
- 2022–2023: Maccabi Rishon LeZion

Igor Nesterenko (Hebrew: איגור נסטרנקו; born August 18, 1990) is an Israeli-Ukrainian former professional basketball player.

== Early life ==
Nesterenko was born in Kiliya, Ukraine, to a Jewish family. Nesterenko lived his first three years in Ukraine before growing up in Rishon LeZion, Israel. He played for the Maccabi Rishon LeZion youth team and the Gymnasia Realit high school team.

== Professional career ==
In 2008, Nesterenko started his professional career with Maccabi Rishon LeZion. On November 1, 2008, he made his professional debut in a match against Maccabi Haifa.

In his fourth season with Rishon LeZion, Nesterenko was loaned to Elitzur Yavne of the Liga Leumit. In his seventh season, Nesterenko helped Rishon LeZion reach the 2015 Israeli League Semifinals, where they eventually were eliminated by Hapoel Jerusalem.

On August 17, 2015, Nesterenko signed a one-year deal with Ironi Nes Ziona.

On July 5, 2016, Nesterenko signed with Ironi Nahariya for the 2016–17 season. Nesterenko helped Nahariya reach the 2017 Israeli League Quarterfinals, as well as reaching the 2017 FIBA Europe Cup Quarterfinals, where they eventually were eliminated by Telekom Baskets Bonn.

On July 23, 2017, Nesterenko signed a two-year contract extension with Ironi Nahariya. On January 3, 2018, Nesterenko recorded a career-high 20 points, shooting 7-of-8 from the field, along with four rebounds and three assists in a 90–98 loss to Hapoel Holon. In 33 games played during the 2017–18 season, he averaged 7.2 points and 4.9 rebounds per game.

On September 8, 2019, Nesterenko joined Hapoel Haifa of the Israeli National League, signing a one-year deal with an option for another one.
