= JP Tokoto =

American basketball player (born 1993)

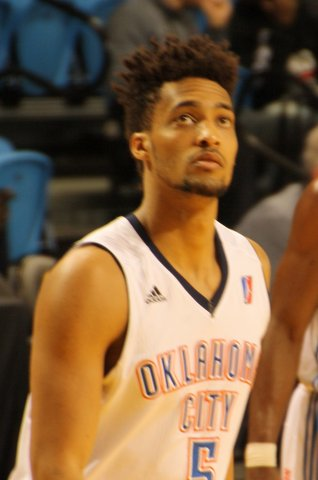
- Tokoto with the Oklahoma City Blue in 2016

No. 6 – Trepça
- Position: Small forward / power forward
- League: Kosovo Superleague; FIBA Europe Cup

Personal information
- Born: September 15, 1993 (age 33) Rockford, Illinois, U.S.
- Listed height: 6 ft 7 in (2.01 m)
- Listed weight: 200 lb (91 kg)

Career information
- High school: Menomonee Falls (Menomonee Falls, Wisconsin)
- College: North Carolina (2012–2015)
- NBA draft: 2015: 2nd round, 58th overall pick
- Drafted by: Philadelphia 76ers
- Playing career: 2015–present

Career history
- 2015–2016: Oklahoma City Blue
- 2016–2017: Rio Grande Valley Vipers
- 2017–2018: Perth Wildcats
- 2018–2019: Hapoel Eilat
- 2019–2020: San Pablo Burgos
- 2020: Ironi Ness Ziona
- 2020–2023: Hapoel Tel Aviv
- 2023–2024: Ironi Ramat Gan
- 2024–2025: Hapoel Afula
- 2025: Hamburg Towers
- 2025–2026: Start Lublin
- 2026–present: Trepça

Career highlights
- Israeli League All-Star (2019); Israeli League All-Star Game MVP (2019); All-NBL Second Team (2018); NBL steals leader (2018); ACC All-Defensive Team (2014)
- Stats at Basketball Reference

Jean-Pierre Tokoto II (born September 15, 1993) is an American-Cameroonian professional basketball player for Trepça of the Kosovo Basketball Superleague. He played college basketball for the University of North Carolina before playing professionally in the NBA G League, Australia, Israel, and Spain.

== High school career ==
Born in Rockford, Illinois, Tokoto attended Menomonee Falls High School in southern Wisconsin, where he averaged 21.2 points, 13.2 rebounds, 3.2 steals, and 2.1 assists as a junior and 24.6 points, 11.5 rebounds, 3.5 assists and 2.6 steals as a senior, earning three-time first-team all-state selection, set several school records, among them, career scoring, rebounding and steals and the school's single-game record with 48 points against Catholic Memorial High School. He also earned Greater Metro Conference Player of the Year honors as a junior and won the 2012 American Family Insurance Slam Dunk contest in New Orleans as a senior.

== College career ==
Tokoto played three years of college basketball for the North Carolina Tar Heels. As a junior, he averaged 8.3 points and 4.3 assists per game and was known for his dunking ability and defensive prowess. He declared for the 2015 NBA draft on April 8, 2015, after his junior season.

== Professional career ==
=== Oklahoma City Blue (2015–2016) ===
On June 25, 2015, Tokoto was selected with the 58th overall pick in the 2015 NBA draft by the Philadelphia 76ers and joined them for the 2015 NBA Summer League. On September 27, 2015, he signed a one-year, non-guaranteed tender worth $525,000 with the 76ers. However, he was waived by the team on October 26 after appearing in five preseason games. On October 30, he joined the 76ers' D-League affiliate team, the Delaware 87ers. The following day, he was acquired by the Oklahoma City Blue in a trade with the 87ers. In 49 games for the Blue in 2015–16, he averaged 11.2 points, 4.1 rebounds, 2.1 assists and 1.5 steals per game.

=== Rio Grande Valley Vipers (2016–2017) ===
In July 2016, Tokoto joined the New York Knicks for the 2016 NBA Summer League. He signed with the Knicks on August 2, but was waived on October 21 after appearing in three preseason games. On October 25, he returned to the Oklahoma City Blue, only to be traded to the Rio Grande Valley Vipers five days later. In 52 games for the Vipers in 2016–17, he averaged 11.7 points, 5.0 rebounds, 2.4 assists and 2.1 steals per game.

=== Perth Wildcats (2017–2018) ===
In July 2017, Tokoto joined the Utah Jazz for the 2017 NBA Summer League. On September 6, 2017, he signed with the Perth Wildcats for the 2017–18 NBL season. He appeared in all 30 games for the Wildcats in 2017–18, averaging 15.4 points, 6.0 rebounds, 2.8 assists and 1.6 steals per game.

=== Hapoel Eliat (2018–2019) ===
On June 27, 2018, Tokoto secured a spot on the Golden State Warriors' roster for the 2018 NBA Summer League.

On July 28, 2018, Tokoto signed a one-year deal with the Israeli team Hapoel Eilat. On January 2, 2019, Tokoto recorded a career-high 31 points, shooting 9-of-12 from the field, along with six rebounds, six assists and three steals for 45 PIR, leading Eilat to a 95–89 win over Hapoel Tel Aviv. He was subsequently named Israeli League Round 12 MVP. On April 12, 2019, Tokoto participated in the 2019 Israeli League All-Star Game, where he recorded 19 points along with five rebounds and was named the All-Star Game MVP. In 38 games played for Eilat, Tokoto led the team in rebounds (7.6) and steals (1.4) per game, to go with 13.4 points and 3.1 assists per game. Tokoto helped Eilat reach the 2019 Israeli League Final Four, where they eventually lost to Maccabi Tel Aviv.

=== San Pablo Burgos (2019–2020) ===
On July 3, 2019, Tokoto signed a one-year deal with the Spanish club San Pablo Burgos. He appeared in 26 games for Burgos in the Liga ACB and the Champions League, averaging 7 points, 5 rebounds and 1.5 steals per game. On January 25, 2020, Tokoto parted ways with Burgos.

=== Ironi Ness Ziona (2020) ===
On January 26, 2020, Tokoto returned to Israel for a second stint, signing with Ironi Ness Ziona for the rest of the season. On February 2, 2020, he made his debut in an 83–88 loss to Ironi Nahariya, recording a double-double of 17 points and 11 rebounds off the bench.

=== Hapoel Tel Aviv (2020–2023) ===
On November 14, 2020, Tokoto signed with Hapoel Tel Aviv.

Tokoto spent three seasons with Hapoel Tel Aviv before joining Maccabi Ironi Ramat Gan for the 2023–24 season. He signed with Hapoel Afula for the 2024–25 season.

=== Hamburg Towers (2025) ===
On August 25, 2025, he signed a three-month contract with Hamburg Towers of the Basketball Bundesliga (BBL).

=== Start Lublin (2025–2026) ===
On December 15, 2025, he signed with Start Lublin of the Polish Basketball League (PLK).

=== Trepça (2026–present) ===
On October 20, 2026, Tokoto signed for Trepça of the Kosovo Basketball Superleague and FIBA Europe Cup.

== Career statistics ==
Legend
GP	Games played	MPG	Minutes per game	FG%	Field goal percentage
3P%	3-point field goal percentage	FT%	Free throw percentage	RPG	Rebounds per game
APG	Assists per game	SPG	Steals per game	BPG	Blocks per game
PPG	Points per game	**Bold**	Career high		Led the league

Year	Team	League	GP	MPG	FG%	3P%	FT%	RPG	APG	SPG	BPG	PPG
2015–16	Oklahoma City Blue	NBA D-League	48	26.6	.460	.250	.712	4	2	1.5	.5	11.2
2016–17	Rio Grande Valley Vipers	NBA D-League	52	33.4	.475	.325	.686	5	2.4	2.1	.4	11.7
2017–18	Perth Wildcats	NBL (AUS)	30	28.2	.464	.256	.719	5.9	2.8	1.7	.5	15.4
2018–19	Hapoel Eilat BC	ISBL	38	28.1	.528	.269	.654	7.6	3.2	1.5	.3	13.4
2019–20	San Pablo Burgos	ACB	26	21.4	.528	.182	.609	5.1	1.5	1	.3	7.0
2019–20	Ironi Ness Ziona	ISBL	15	31.3	.563	.000	.529	8.9	4.2	2.2	.6	14.4
2020–21	Hapoel Tel Aviv	ISBL	16	28.9	.500	.294	.596	5.3	5.3	1.6	.4	13.6
2021–22	Hapoel Tel Aviv	ISBL	31	31.7	.474	.160	.706	7.5	3.5	1.5	.3	14.5

=== College statistics ===
Year	Team	GP	GS	MPG	FG%	3P%	FT%	RPG	APG	SPG	BPG	PPG
2012–13	North Carolina	35	0	8.7	**.488**	.091	.385	1.7	.7	.5	.1	2.6
2013–14	North Carolina	34	33	28.6	**.489**	.222	.500	**5.8**	3	**1.6**	**.5**	**9.3**
2014–15	North Carolina	**38**	**34**	**29.1**	.428	**.375**	**.615**	5.6	**4.3**	1.5	.3	8.3
**Career**		107	67	22.3	.462	.266	.544	4.4	2.7	1.2	.3	6.8

== Personal life ==
Tokoto was named after his maternal grandfather, Jean-Pierre Tokoto, who played soccer for the Cameroon national team. He starred in all three games for Cameroon at the 1982 FIFA World Cup. Tokoto's mother, Laurence Tokoto Trimble, met her husband, Trevor Trimble, in Menomonee Falls, Wisconsin. Tokoto's biological father is former NBA player Brian Oliver. Seth Trimble, Tokoto's younger half-brother, plays college basketball for Tokoto's alma mater North Carolina.
