= Suleiman Braimoh =

Nigerian-American basketball player

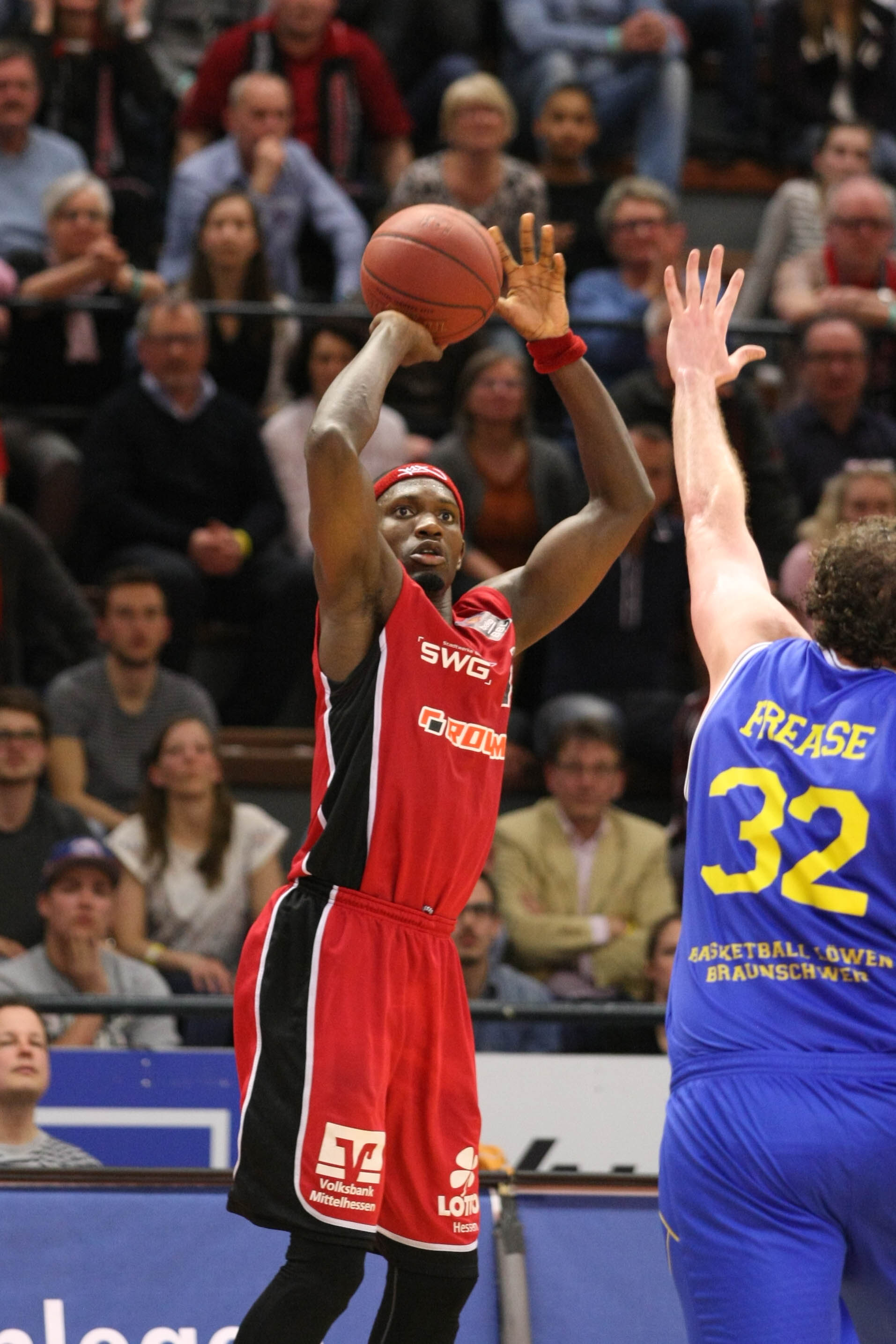
- Braimoh with the Gießen 46ers in April 2016

Free Agent
- Position: Power forward / center

Personal information
- Born: October 19, 1989 (age 37) Benin City, Edo, Nigeria
- Listed height: 6 ft 8 in (2.03 m)
- Listed weight: 230 lb (104 kg)

Career information
- High school: United Nations International School (New York City, New York); Lawrenceville School (Lawrenceville, New Jersey)
- College: Rice (2007–2011)
- NBA draft: 2011: undrafted
- Playing career: 2011–present

Career history
- 2011–2012: Rio Grande Valley Vipers
- 2012: Al-Gharafa
- 2013: Al Rayyan
- 2013–2014: Niigata Albirex
- 2014: Shinshu Brave Warriors
- 2014: Taranaki Mountainairs
- 2014–2015: Huracanes de Tampico
- 2015: Hawke's Bay Hawks
- 2015–2016: Gießen 46ers
- 2016–2017: Enisey
- 2017: Nanterre 92
- 2017–2018: Enisey
- 2018–2019: Hapoel Eilat
- 2019–2021: Hapoel Jerusalem
- 2021: San Pablo Burgos
- 2021–2022: Hapoel Jerusalem
- 2022–2023: Tofaş
- 2023: Maccabi Tel Aviv
- 2023: Meralco Bolts
- 2024–2025: Al-Ittihad Jeddah
- 2025: Karşıyaka Basket

Career highlights
- Israeli State Cup winner (2020); Israeli League Cup winner (2019); Israeli League Cup MVP (2019); 2× Israeli League Sixth Man of the Year (2019, 2020); All-Israeli League Second Team (2019); VTB United League Sixth Man of the Year (2017); BBL All-Star (2016); LNBP All-Star (2015); NZNBL Most Outstanding Forward (2014); NZNBL All-Star Five (2014); Qatar Emir Cup champion (2013); Qatar Heir Apparent Cup champion (2013)

Suleiman Okhaifoede Braimoh Jr. (born October 19, 1989) is a Nigerian professional basketball player who last played for Karşıyaka Basket of the Basketbol Süper Ligi (BSL). He played college basketball for Rice University before playing professionally in the NBA Development League, Qatar, Japan, New Zealand, Mexico, Germany, Russia, France, Israel, Turkey, and the Philippines.

== Early life ==
Braimoh was born in Benin City, Nigeria, but moved to the United States with his parents in 2001. Playing primarily soccer as a child, it was not until 2004–05 that he started playing organised basketball.

== High school career ==
Braimoh attended the United Nations International School in New York City. As a senior in 2005–06, he averaged 27 points, 11 rebounds, and four blocks as he was named athlete of the year and league MVP. In 2006–07, he prepped at Lawrenceville School in Lawrenceville, New Jersey where he averaged 14 points, 12 rebounds, and five blocks for coach Ron Kane. He was named second-team all-prep by the Trenton Times and the Trentonian and was selected to the All-Middle Atlantic Prep League team as the Big Red posted an 18–11 overall record.

== College career ==
In his freshman season at Rice, Braimoh was the Owls sixth man and was the team's leading shooter from the field, connecting on 46.3 percent of his shots. In 30 games (seven starts), he averaged 4.0 points and 3.3 rebounds per game.

In his sophomore season, his role and production was relatively similar as he was still the team's sixth man. In 32 games (15 starts), he averaged 4.5 points and 3.0 rebounds per game.

In his junior season, he played 31 games, averaging 4.5 points and 3.8 rebounds in 12.3 minute per game. In his senior season, he played 31 games, averaging 4.4 points and 2.1 rebounds in 10.8 minutes per game.

== Professional career ==
=== 2011–12 season ===
After going undrafted in the 2011 NBA draft, Braimoh tried out for the Rio Grande Valley Vipers of the NBA Development League in November and successfully made the team. In February 2012, he left the Vipers after appearing in just 15 games. The next month, he joined Al-Gharafa of Qatar for the rest of the season.

=== 2012–13 season ===
On October 6, 2012, Braimoh signed with the Taranaki Mountainairs for the 2013 New Zealand NBL season. He was later acquired by the Reno Bighorns on November 1 but did not end up making the final team as he was waived on November 21 prior to the start of the season. In January 2013, he signed with Al Rayyan of Qatar for the rest of the season, going on to help the club win the 2013 Emir Cup and Heir Apparent Cup.

In April 2013, he was released from his contract with the Mountainairs after his application for a visa was turned down.

=== 2013–14 season ===
In October 2013, Braimoh signed with Niigata Albirex of Japan for the 2013–14 season. On February 5, 2014, he left Niigata and joined the Shinshu Brave Warriors for the rest of the season, but on February 21, he was released by Shinshu after appearing in just three games.

In March 2014, he re-signed with the Taranaki Mountainairs for the 2014 New Zealand NBL season. On May 1, he was named Player of the Week for Round 4. He went on to earn Player of the Week honors the following three rounds as well, making it four consecutive on the season. He finished the season with averages of 24.9 points, 12.2 rebounds and 1.5 blocks in 18 games and subsequently earned All-Star Five honors.

=== 2014–15 season ===
In September 2014, Braimoh signed with Huracanes de Tampico of Mexico for the 2014–15 LNBP season. In 46 games for Huracanes, he averaged 20.1 points and 8.2 rebounds per game.

On March 25, 2015, he signed with the Hawke's Bay Hawks for the 2015 New Zealand NBL season. On May 1, he was named Player of the Week for Round 4 after recording 21 points and 14 rebounds against Taranaki on April 26. In 16 games for the Hawks, he averaged 17.8 points, 8.6 rebounds, 1.8 assists, 1.2 steals and 1.1 blocks per game.

=== 2015–16 season ===
On July 16, 2015, Braimoh signed with the Gießen 46ers of Germany for the 2015–16 Basketball Bundesliga season. In 32 games for the 46ers, he averaged 12.3 points, 3.7 rebounds and 1.3 assists per game.

=== 2016–17 season ===
On September 17, 2016, Braimoh signed with Enisey Krasnoyarsk of the VTB United League. Braimoh won the VTB United League Sixth Man of the Year Award for the 2016–17 season. He played in 24 games during the regular season (starting 22 on the bench), averaging 13.0 points, 5.0 rebounds, 1.8 assists and a 13.8 efficiency rating.

On May 12, 2017, Braimoh signed with French team Nanterre 92 for the rest of the 2016–17 Pro A season.

=== 2017–18 season ===
On June 21, 2017, Braimoh re-signed with Enisey Krasnoyarsk for the 2017–18 season. In 23 league games, he averaged 10.9 points, 6.4 rebounds, 1.2 assists and 1.1 steals per game. He also averaged 9.8 points, 6.5 rebounds and 1.0 blocks in 14 BCL games.

=== 2018–19 season ===
On November 4, 2018, Braimoh signed a one-year deal with the Israeli team Hapoel Eilat as a replacement for Devin Thomas. On February 28, 2019, Braimoh recorded a season-high 28 points, shooting 11-of-15 from the field, along with four rebounds and two steals in a 93–75 win over Ironi Nahariya. On April 4, 2019, Braimoh was named Israeli League Player of the Month after averaging 19.0 points and 5.5 rebounds for 27.3 PIR per game in four games played in March.

Braimoh helped Eilat reach the 2019 Israeli League Final Four, where they eventually lost to Maccabi Tel Aviv. In 34 games played for Eilat, he finished as the league fourth-leading player in efficiency rating (19.3 per game), to go with 15.3 points, 6.1 rebounds, 1.3 steals and 1.2 blocks per game. On June 7, 2019, Braimoh was named the Israeli League Sixth Man of the Year and earned a spot in the All-Israeli League Second Team.

=== 2019–20 season ===
On July 11, 2019, Braimoh signed a 1+1 contract with Hapoel Jerusalem. On September 28, 2019, Braimoh won the Israeli League Cup title with Jerusalem after an 84–83 dramatic win over Maccabi Tel Aviv, where he recorded 16 points and 5 rebounds. He was subsequently named the Tournament MVP. On December 28, 2019, Braimoh recorded a double-double with a season-high 25 points and 10 rebounds, while shooting 9-of-16 from the field, along with three steals in a 91–84 win over Hapoel Holon. He averaged 12.2 points and 5.2 rebounds per game.

=== 2020–21 season ===
On August 9, 2020, Braimoh re-signed with Hapoel Jerusalem. He averaged 17.1 points and 5.9 rebounds during the 2020–21 season.

=== 2021–22 season ===
On July 21, 2021, Braimoh signed with San Pablo Burgos of the Spanish Liga ACB, with whom he played 10 games. In November 2021, he left Burgos and returned to Hapoel Jerusalem in Israel.

=== 2022–23 season ===
On July 8, 2022, Braimoh signed with Tofaş of the Turkish BSL. In 12 games, he averaged 8.6 points, 6.2 rebounds, and 1.7 assists per game.

On January 19, 2023, Braimoh left Turkey and joined Maccabi Tel Aviv in Israel for the rest of the season. In 11 EuroLeague games, he averaged 2.2 points and 1.3 rebounds in 8 minutes per contest.

=== 2023–24 season ===
On October 18, 2023, Braimoh signed with the Meralco Bolts of the Philippine Basketball Association (PBA) as the team's import for the 2023–24 PBA Commissioner's Cup. He left the team in early December after undergoing surgery on a torn Achilles.

=== 2024–25 season ===
In September 2024, Braimoh joined the Al-Ittihad Jeddah of the Saudi Basketball League (SBL).

On March 28, 2025, he signed with Karşıyaka Basket of the Basketbol Süper Ligi (BSL).

== Personal life ==
Braimoh is the son of Suleiman Sr., a PhD holder, and Igho, a law school graduate.
