= Bnei Herzliya Basket =

Israeli Basketball Premier League team in Herzliya, Israel

Bnei Herzliya
- Leagues: Israeli Basketball Premier League; Champions League
- Founded: 1985; 41 years ago
- Arena: HaYovel Arena
- Capacity: 2,000
- Location: Herzliya, Israel
- Team colors: Blue, White
- CEO: Amit Zedekiah
- President: Eldad Akunis
- General manager: Zufer Avdija
- Head coach: Yehu Orland
- Ownership: Lenny Rekanati; Tal Rekanati
- Championships: Israeli State Cup (2)
- Website: bhbasket.co.il
Home	Away

Bnei Herzliya Basket (Hebrew: בני הרצליה, lit. Sons of Herzliya), are a professional basketball club based in Herzliya, in central Israel. The club plays in the Israeli Basketball Premier League, the top division of Israeli basketball.

== History ==
The club was originally founded in 1985, under the name Hapoel Herzliya. In 2002, the club merged with Maccabi Ra'anana in a neighboring town, and was re-named Bnei HaSharon. The merger was done because of Maccabi Ra'anana's financial problems and Bnei HaSharon's relegation from the top-level Israeli Basketball Premier League, following the 2001–02 season.

At the end of 2010–11 season, the merger ended, and the team started playing only for the city of Herzliya. In 2012, the club was re-named Bnei Herzliya. In 2022, the club won the Israeli State Cup for the second time, beating Hapoel Tel Aviv 87:82 in the final.

== Honours ==
=== Domestic competitions ===
- Israeli State Cup

Winners (2): 1994–95, 2021–22.
Runners-up (4): 2004–05, 2006–07, 2009–10, 2025–26.

== Season by season ==
Season	Tier	Division	Pos.	European competitions		
2009–10	1	Premier League	8th			
2010–11	1	Premier League	5th			
2011–12	1	Premier League	10th			
2012–13	1	Premier League	11th			
2013–14	1	Premier League	11th			
2014–15	1	Premier League	9th			
2015–16	1	Premier League	7th			
2016–17	1	Premier League	5th	4 FIBA Europe Cup	R2	5–7
2017–18	1	Premier League	10th	4 FIBA Europe Cup	RS	4–6
2018–19	1	Premier League	12th			
2019–20	2	National League	2nd			
2020–21	1	Premier League	11th	Balkan League	RS	2–2
2021–22	1	Premier League	2nd			
2022–23	1	Premier League	QF	3 Champions League	RS	2–4
2023–24	1	Premier League	10th	4 FIBA Europe Cup	RS	Withdrew
2024–25	1	Premier League	QF			

== Players ==
=== Current roster ===
Bnei Herzliya roster
Players
Coaches

Pos.	No.	Nat.	Name	Ht.	Age
G	3	(United States)	Bryant, Zack	1.88 m (6 ft 2 in)	28 – 24 November 1997
G	5	(United States)	Francis, Daeshon	1.95 m (6 ft 5 in)	29 – 26 January 1997
SG	9	(United States)	Hannahs, Dusty	1.91 m (6 ft 3 in)	33 – 2 September 1993
G	11	(Israel)	Solomon, Ray	1.88 m (6 ft 2 in)	18 – 20 September 2008
PG	12	(Israel)	Menachem, Amit	1.87 m (6 ft 2 in)	22 – 14 March 2004
F/C	13	(United States)	Knight, Nathan	2.06 m (6 ft 9 in)	29 – 20 September 1997
G	15	(Israel)	Obziler, Kai	1.98 m (6 ft 6 in)	19 – 23 April 2007
SG	20	(Israel)	Gershon, Amit	1.91 m (6 ft 3 in)	30 – 5 December 1995
G	22	(Israel)	Billet, Imri	1.90 m (6 ft 3 in)	18 – 20 October 2008
G	23	(United States)	Brewton, DJ	1.91 m (6 ft 3 in)	26 – 15 January 2000
F/C	30	(United States)	Burns, D. J.	2.06 m (6 ft 9 in)	26 – 13 July 2000
SG	34	(Israel)	Shalem, Nitay	1.93 m (6 ft 4 in)	20 – 7 December 2005
F	35	(United States)	Carter, Noah	2.01 m (6 ft 7 in)	25 – 13 November 2000
C	41	(Israel)	Kagan, Emry	2.10 m (6 ft 11 in)	21 – 22 February 2005

Head coach

- (Israel) Yehu Orland

Assistant coach(es)

- (Israel) Elishay Kadir
- (Israel) Ben Shemer

Legend

- (C) Team captain
- Injured

- Roster
Updated: August 20, 2026

=== Depth chart ===
Pos.	Starting 5	Bench 1	Bench 2
C	Nathan Knight	D. J. Burns
PF	Noah Carter	Omer Sadeh	Nitay Shalem
SF	Amit Gershon	DJ Brewton
SG	Daeshon Francis	Dusty Hannahs	Kai Obziler
PG	Deishuan Booker	Zack Bryant	Imri Billet
