= Ironi Ness Ziona B.C. =

Basketball team in Israel

Ironi Ness Ziona
- Leagues: Israeli Basketball Premier League
- Founded: 2005; 21 years ago
- History: Ironi Nes Ziona B.C. (2005–present)
- Arena: Lev Hamoshava
- Capacity: 1,200
- Location: Ness Ziona, Israel
- Team colors: Orange, White, Navy
- Main sponsor: Hai Motors
- CEO: Yaniv Mizrahi
- President: Guy Goldberg (Chairman)
- General manager: Meir Tapiro
- Team manager: Itamar Rosenberg (VP Operations); Effie Shemesh (Team Manager)
- Head coach: Paul Corsaro
- Team captain: Spencer Weisz
- Championships: 1 FIBA Europe Cup
Home	Away	Third

Ironi Ness Ziona B.C. (also spelled Ironi Nes Ziona B.C. and known for sponsorship reasons as Ironi "Hai Motors" Ness Ziona) is an Israeli professional basketball club based in Ness Ziona, Israel. The team competes in the Israeli Basketball Premier League, the top tier of Israeli basketball, and plays its home games at the 1,200-seat Lev Hamoshava arena.

Founded in 2005 on the foundation of the former Hapoel Ness Ziona club, the team won the second-tier Liga Leumit championship in 2012–13 to earn its first promotion to the Israeli Basketball Premier League. It made its European debut in the 2018–19 FIBA Europe Cup and won the 2020–21 edition of the competition—the continental fourth-tier championship—defeating Stal Ostrów Wielkopolski in the final in Tel Aviv to capture the first major trophy in club history.

== History ==
The logo of Ironi used until 2021

Ironi Ness Ziona was founded in 2005 on the foundation of the former Hapoel Ness Ziona club. Beginning in the lower tiers of Israeli basketball, the club won the third-tier Liga Artzit in 2011 and captured the second-tier Liga Leumit title in 2012–13, to earn its first-ever promotion to the Israeli Basketball Premier League. After being relegated in 2016, Ironi won Liga Leumit again in 2016–17, securing an immediate return to the top flight.

In the 2018–19 season, Ironi Nes Ziona made its debut in a European competition. It played in the qualifying rounds of the 2018–19 FIBA Europe Cup, and played its first match ever on 20 September 2018, defeating the Södertälje Kings 72–67. The team went on to qualify for the regular season, where it played in Group D. It advanced to the play-offs, where it lost in the first round to the Bakken Bears from Denmark.

In the 2020–21 FIBA Europe Cup, Ironi played its third season in the competition and qualified for the Final Four, hosted at Menora Mivtachim Arena in Tel Aviv. After edging BC Parma 81–80 in the semifinals on a game-winning three-pointer by Wayne Selden Jr., Ironi defeated Stal Ostrów Wielkopolski 82–74 in the final to win the first trophy in club history. With the victory, Ironi Ness Ziona became the third Israeli club—alongside Maccabi Tel Aviv and Hapoel Jerusalem—to win a European championship, and Selden was named Final Four MVP.

In the 2022–23 European North Basketball League, Ironi advanced to the quarterfinals before falling to Start Lublin. The club later withdrew from the 2023–24 FIBA Europe Cup in October 2023 due to the outbreak of the Gaza war. Domestically, Ironi placed seventh in the Israeli Basketball Premier League in 2024–25, and 11th in 2025–26.

== Sponsorship names ==
The club has had two sponsorship names:

- Ironi "Dizengoff Trading" Nes Ziona (2013–17)
- Ironi "Hai Motors" Nes Ziona (2017–present)

== Players ==
=== Current roster ===
Ironi Ness Ziona roster
Players
Coaches

Pos.	No.	Nat.	Name	Ht.	Age
G/F	1	(United States)	James, Justin	2.01 m (6 ft 7 in)	29 – 24 January 1997
G	4	(Israel)	Galitzki, Omer	1.87 m (6 ft 2 in)	18 – 12 May 2008
PG	5	(France)	Amsellem, Vincent	1.93 m (6 ft 4 in)	24 – 11 March 2002
G/F	10	(United States) (Israel)	Weisz, Spencer (C)	1.93 m (6 ft 4 in)	31 – 31 May 1995
F	11	(Israel) (Germany)	Ariel, Adam	1.92 m (6 ft 4 in)	31 – 10 December 1994
G	12	(Israel)	Azulay, Yoav	1.84 m (6 ft 0 in)	18 – 26 September 2008
SG	13	(United States)	Christopher, Josh	1.95 m (6 ft 5 in)	24 – 8 December 2001
G	14	(Israel)	Dovrat, Noam	1.96 m (6 ft 5 in)	24 – 16 July 2002
G/F	15	(Israel)	Lugashi, Shalev	1.94 m (6 ft 4 in)	25 – 24 September 2001
C	23	(Israel)	Sror, Benaya	2.08 m (6 ft 10 in)	27 – 1 November 1999
F/C	24	(United States)	Wiley, Jacob	2.03 m (6 ft 8 in)	32 – 4 September 1994
C	33	(United States)	Gillespie, Freddie	2.08 m (6 ft 10 in)	29 – 14 June 1997
F	44	(Canada)	Rowe, Jackson	1.98 m (6 ft 6 in)	29 – 4 January 1997
PG	55	(United States) (Cameroon)	Lee, Paris	1.83 m (6 ft 0 in)	31 – 20 April 1995
G	58	(Israel)	Rahamim, Gal	1.92 m (6 ft 4 in)	17 – 5 August 2009

Head coach

- (United States) Paul Corsaro

Assistant coach(es)

- (Israel) Mor Nahum
- (United States) Tony Willis
- (Lithuania) Vytautas Valiulis

Legend

- (C) Team captain
- Injured

- Roster
Updated: November 10, 2026

=== Depth chart ===
Pos.	Starting 5	Bench 1	Bench 2	Bench 3
C	Benaya Sror	Freddie Gillespie	Shalev Lugashi
PF	Jackson Rowe	Spencer Weisz	Adam Ariel
SF	Jacob Wiley	Justin James	Egor Koulechov
SG	Josh Christopher	Noam Dovrat	Omer Galitzki
PG	Paris Lee	Vincent Amsellem	Yoav Azulay	Gal Rahamim

- The Israeli League requires teams to have at least two Israeli players on the court at all times, and allows up to five foreign players to be dressed per game.

=== Notable players ===
Note: Flags indicate national team eligibility at FIBA-sanctioned events. Players may hold other non-FIBA nationalities not displayed.

Criteria

To appear in this section a player must have either:

- Set a club record or won an individual award while at the club
- Played at least one official international match for their national team at any time
- Played at least one official NBA match at any time.

- (United States) (Israel) Joe Dawson 3 seasons: '05–'08
- (Israel) Tal Dunne 12 seasons: '08–'09, '11–'22
- (Israel) Tal Karpelesz 3 seasons: '11–'13, '15–'16
- (United States) (Israel) Cory Carr 1 season: '13–'14
- (United States) Tyler Honeycutt 1 season: '13–'14
- (United States) Preston Knowles 2 seasons: '13–'15
- (Israel) Meir Tapiro 2 seasons: '13–'15
- (United States) Diamon Simpson 2 seasons: '13–'14, '15–'16
- (United States) Mitchell Watt 3 seasons: '13–'15, '16
- (United States) Craig Smith 1 season: '14–'15
- (United States) Lamayn Wilson 1 season: '14–'15
- (Israel) Yuval Naimy 1 season: '15–'16
- (United States Virgin Islands) (Puerto Rico) Ivan Aska 1 season: '15–'16
- (United States) Fuquan Edwin 1 season: '15–'16
- (United States) Terrico White 1 season: '15–'16
- (United States) Sundiata Gaines 1 season: '15–'16
- (United States) Lee Roberts 1 season: '16–'17
- (United States) Jermaine Beal 1 season: '16–'17
- (Israel) Golan Gutt 6 seasons: '16–'20, '21–'23
- (United States) Khalif Wyatt 1 season: '17–'18
- (Puerto Rico) Gary Browne 2 seasons: '17–'19
- (Nigeria) Talib Zanna 2 seasons: '17–'19
- (Israel) Elishay Kadir 2 seasons: '17–'19
- (United States) Daequan Cook 3 seasons: '17–'20
- (United States) Chris Dowe 1 season: '18–'19
- (Finland) Gerald Lee 1 season: '18–'19
- (Canada) Lindell Wigginton 1 season: '20–'21
- (United States) Jerome Meyinsse 3 seasons: '20–'21, '22–'24
- (United States) Wayne Selden Jr. 2 seasons: '20–'21, '22–'23
- (United States) Tyler Bey 1 season: '22–'23
- (United States) D. J. Cooper 1 season: '22–'23
- (Israel) Itay Segev 2 seasons: '23–'25
- (United States) Bryce Brown 2 seasons: '24–'26
- (Nigeria) Udoka Azubuike 1 season: '25–'26
- (Indonesia) (United States) Marques Bolden 1 season: '25–'26
- (United States) Damion Lee 1 season: '25–'26
- (United States) Josh Christopher 1 season: '26–present

== Honors ==
=== European competitions ===
- FIBA Europe Cup
  - Champions (1): 2020–21

=== Domestic competitions ===
- Liga Leumit (2nd tier)
  - Champions (2): 2012–13, 2016–17
- Liga Artzit (3rd tier)
  - Champions (1): 2010–11

== Season by season ==
Season	Tier	League	Pos.	State Cup	League Cup	European competitions		
2010–11	3	Liga Artzit	1st					
2011–12	2	National League	4th	First round				
2012–13	2	National League	1st					
2013–14	1	Premier League	6th	Eightfinalist				
2014–15	1	Premier League	8th	Eightfinalist	Semifinalist			
2015–16	1	Premier League	12th	Semifinalist	Quarterfinalist			
2016–17	2	National League	1st	Quarterfinalist				
2017–18	1	Premier League	8th	Round of 16				
2018–19	1	Premier League	5th	First round		4 FIBA Europe Cup	R16	11–7
2019–20	1	Premier League	7th	Semifinalist	Semifinalist	4 FIBA Europe Cup	2R	7–5
2020–21	1	Premier League	7th	Quarterfinalist	First round	4 FIBA Europe Cup	C	6–1
2020–21	1	Premier League	7th	Quarterfinalist	First round	Balkan League	RS	0–4
2021–22	1	Premier League	10th	Quarterfinalist	First round	4 FIBA Europe Cup	Q	1–1
2022–23	1	Premier League	6th	Semifinalist	First round	European North League	Q	5–4
2023–24	1	Premier League	8th	Quarterfinalist	—	4 FIBA Europe Cup	RS	Withdrew
2024–25	1	Premier League	7th	Quarterfinalist	Quarterfinalist			
