= 2018 Israeli Basketball League Cup =

Israeli basketball pre-season tournament

Tournament details
- Arena: Beit Maccabi; Rishon LeZion
- Dates: September 25 – October 4, 2018

Final positions
- Champions: Maccabi Rishon LeZion (1st title)
- Runners-up: Hapoel Be'er Sheva

Awards and statistics
- MVP: (United States) Cameron Long

The 2018 Israeli Basketball League Cup, for sponsorships reasons the Winner League Cup, was the 13th edition of the pre-season tournament of the Israeli Basketball Premier League.

On October 4, 2018, Maccabi Rishon LeZion won the title for the first time after a 78–66 win over Hapoel Be'er Sheva in the Final. Cameron Long was named tournament MVP.

== Bracket ==
Qualifying Round; 25–26 September
Maccabi Rishon LeZion	91
Bnei Herzliya	76
Ironi Nahariya	83
Hapoel Be'er Sheva	88

Quarterfinals; 27 September-1 October
Maccabi Tel Aviv	77
Maccabi Rishon LeZion	86
Hapoel Jerusalem	78
Hapoel Eilat	74
Hapoel Holon	73
Hapoel Be'er Sheva	77
Maccabi Ashdod	65
Hapoel Gilboa Galil	62

Semifinals; 2 October
Maccabi Rishon LeZion	92
Hapoel Jerusalem	81
Hapoel Be'er Sheva	97
Maccabi Ashdod	95

Final; 4 October
Maccabi Rishon LeZion	78
Hapoel Be'er Sheva	66

== Qualifying round ==
=== I. Nahariya vs. H. Be'er Sheva ===
September 25, 2018	Ironi Nahariya	83–88(OT)	Hapoel Be'er Sheva	Nahariya
19:45	Scoring by quarter: 16–22, 29–17, 17–19, 9–13, Overtime: 12–17
Sport 5	Pts: Ziv 25; Rebs: Henry 9 Asts: Four players 4 PIR: Ziv 32	Box Score	Pts: Braun 26; Rebs: Donaldson 7 Asts: Christon & Colman 4 PIR: Braun 28	Arena: Ein Sarah; Attendance: 1500; Referees: Zahi Habdali, Uri Shalhavi, Eran Shmuel

=== M. Rishon LeZion vs. B. Herzliya ===
September 26, 2018	Maccabi Rishon LeZion	91–76	Bnei Herzliya	Rishon LeZion
20:45	Scoring by quarter: 24–15, 19–16, 21–21, 27–24
Sport 5	Pts: Blayzer & Long 17; Rebs: Segev 10; Asts: Long 13; PIR: Long & Segev 25	Box Score	Pts: Adrien 19; Rebs: Adrien & Hanochi 6 Asts: Robinson 7 PIR: Adrien 27	Arena: Beit Maccabi; Attendance: 700; Referees: David Romano, Nir Meirson, Gil Gordon

== Quarterfinals ==
=== M. Ashdod vs. H. Gilboa Galil ===
September 27, 2018	Maccabi Ashdod	65–62	Hapoel Gilboa Galil	Rishon LeZion
18:00	Scoring by quarter: 20–16, 20–23, 10–10, 15–13
Sport 5	Pts: Milbourne 16; Rebs: Shoshi 12; Asts: Stoll 5 PIR: Flaisher 20	Box Score	Pts: Miller & Kelly 13; Rebs: Kelly 9 Asts: Miller 5 PIR: Kelly 20	Arena: Beit Maccabi; Attendance: 700; Referees: Elad Leibovich, Pini Rimon, Guy Simani

=== H. Holon vs. H. Be'er Sheva ===
September 27, 2018	Hapoel Holon	73–77	Hapoel Be'er Sheva	Rishon LeZion
21:00	Scoring by quarter: 21–18, 18–24, 19–16, 15–19
Sport 5	Pts: Simhon 15; Rebs: Atkins & Harush 5 Asts: Walden 5 PIR: Walden 20	Box Score	Pts: Christon 15; Rebs: Donaldson 15; Asts: Braun 5 PIR: Donaldson 25	Arena: Beit Maccabi; Attendance: 1300; Referees: Gili Cohen, Eyal Pohoryles, David Colangi

=== H. Jerusalem vs. H. Eilat ===
September 29, 2018	Hapoel Jerusalem	78–74	Hapoel Eilat	Rishon LeZion
20:30	Scoring by quarter: 17–20, 25–18, 20–13, 16–23
Sport 5	Pts: Brown 15; Rebs: Butler 8 Asts: Blatt 7 PIR: Timor 19	Box Score	Pts: Smith Jr. 28; Rebs: Bryant & Smith Jr. 8 Asts: Tokoto 7 PIR: Smith Jr. 38	Arena: Beit Maccabi; Attendance: 1700; Referees: Dan Yalon, Guy Shmueli, Alex Naftali

=== M. Tel Aviv vs. M. Rishon LeZion ===
October 1, 2018	Maccabi Tel Aviv	77–86	Maccabi Rishon LeZion	Rishon LeZion
20:30	Scoring by quarter: 18–28, 23–14, 22–20, 14–24
Sport 5	Pts: Roll 14; Rebs: Black 7 Asts: Pargo 5 PIR: Black 15	Box Score	Pts: Stephens 19; Rebs: Three players 7 Asts: Wright 7 PIR: Stephens 26	Arena: Beit Maccabi; Attendance: 2200; Referees: Sefi Shemesh, Kfir Mualem, Rotem Koza

== Semifinals ==
=== H. Be'er Sheva vs. M. Ashdod ===
October 2, 2018	Hapoel Be'er Sheva	97–95(2OT)	Maccabi Ashdod	Rishon LeZion
17:00	Scoring by quarter: 27–18, 18–19, 16–19, 16–21, Overtime: 9–9, 11–9
Sport 5	Pts: Christon 30; Rebs: Warech 7 Asts: Christon 11; PIR: Christon 38	Box Score	Pts: Milbourne 34; Rebs: Rosefelt 11; Asts: Pemberton 7 PIR: Milbourne 36	Arena: Beit Maccabi; Attendance: 500; Referees: Omer Esteron, Zahi Habdali, Guy Shmueli

=== M. Rishon LeZion vs. H. Jerusalem ===
October 2, 2018	Maccabi Rishon LeZion	92–81	Hapoel Jerusalem	Rishon LeZion
20:15	Scoring by quarter: 28–14, 22–12, 20–23, 22–32
Sport 5	Pts: Stephens 19; Rebs: Segev 12; Asts: Long 9 PIR: Long 26	Box Score	Pts: Blatt & Feldeine 16; Rebs: Owens 9 Asts: Brown 4 PIR: Owens 24	Arena: Beit Maccabi; Attendance: 2100; Referees: Amit Balak, Ofer Manheim, Elad Leibovich

== Final ==
=== M. Rishon LeZion vs. H. Be'er Sheva ===
October 4, 2018	Maccabi Rishon LeZion	78–66	Hapoel Be'er Sheva	Rishon LeZion
21:00	Scoring by quarter: 15–7, 30–14, 11–22, 22–23
Sport 5	Pts: Long 24; Rebs: Koulechov 12; Asts: Wright 5 PIR: Long 39	Box Score	Pts: Braun 21; Rebs: Braun 9 Asts: Christon 4 PIR: Braun 25	Arena: Beit Maccabi; Attendance: 2200; Referees: Erez Gurion, Pini Rimon, Nir Meirson

Starters:			Pts	Reb	Ast
G	1	(United States) Marquis Wright	8	1	5
G	20	(United States) Cameron Long	24	7	4
G/F	4	(Israel) Egor Koulechov	9	12	4
F	23	(United States) Deshawn Stephens	13	6	1
C	9	(Israel) Itay Segev	6	6	1
Reserves:					
F	14	(Israel) Oz Blayzer	10	8	0
G/F	11	(Israel) Adam Ariel	6	2	0
C	44	(United States) David Weaver	2	0	0
G	30	(Israel) Nimrod Tishman	0	0	0
G	3	(Israel) Amit Ebo	0	0	1
G	2	(Israel) Yair Bauman	DNP		
F	6	(Israel) Guy Netzer	DNP		
Head coach:
(Israeli Basketball Association) Zvi Sherf

Rishon LeZion	Be'er Sheva

Starters:			Pts	Reb	Ast
G	6	(United States) Semaj Christon	12	2	4
G	55	(Israel) Chanan Colman	2	3	1
G/F	21	(Israel) Travis Warech	11	6	0
F	24	(United States) Taylor Braun	21	9	2
C	35	(United States) Jakim Donaldson	4	5	0
Reserves:					
F	7	(United States) Jordan Swing	10	4	3
C	2	(Israel) Ben Eisenhardt	6	3	2
G	0	(Israel) Amit Gershon	0	0	0
G	3	(Israel) Yair Kravitz	0	0	0
C	36	(Israel) Ram Elias-Pour	0	0	0
G/F	5	(Israel) Ohad Cohen	0	0	0
G	12	(Israel) Adi Cohen-Saban	DNP		
Head coach:
(Israeli Basketball Association) Rami Hadar

2018 League Cup Winners
Maccabi Rishon LeZion
1st title
