= Cameron Long =

American basketball player (born 1988)

Free agent
- Position: Point guard / shooting guard

Personal information
- Born: December 30, 1988 (age 37) Palm Bay, Florida, U.S.
- Listed height: 6 ft 4 in (1.93 m)
- Listed weight: 187 lb (85 kg)

Career information
- High school: Freedom (Woodbridge, Virginia)
- College: George Mason (2007–2011)
- NBA draft: 2011: undrafted
- Playing career: 2011–present

Career history
- 2011–2012: Šiauliai
- 2012–2013: Le Mans
- 2013–2014: ratiopharm Ulm
- 2015–2016: s.Oliver Würzburg
- 2016–2017: Steaua București
- 2017: Maccabi Rishon LeZion
- 2017–2018: Maccabi Ashdod
- 2018–2019: Maccabi Rishon LeZion

Career highlights
- Israeli League Cup winner (2018); Israeli League Cup MVP (2018); All-Israeli League Second Team (2019); First-team All-CAA (2011); Second-team All-CAA (2010)

Cameron Scott Long (born December 30, 1988) is an American professional basketball player who last played for Maccabi Rishon LeZion of the Israeli Premier League. A combo guard, he played college basketball for the George Mason University before playing professionally in Lithuania, France, Germany, Romania and Israel. He was named the Israeli League Cup MVP in 2018.

== Early life and college career ==
Long attended Freedom High School in Woodbridge, Virginia, where he averaged 18.9 points, six assists, seven rebounds and two steals per game as a senior. Long was named Cardinal District Player of the Year, Northwest Region Co-Player of the Year and was a nominee for McDonald's All-American.

Long played college basketball for George Mason University's Patriots, where he ranked 10th in the conference in scoring with 15.1 points per game, sixth in steals (1.4), 11th in field goal percentage (47.9 percent) and 14th in assists (2.9). He shot 43.2 percent from three-point range, the third highest mark in the league, and scored double figures in 30 of Mason's 34 contests.

Long completed his career with Mason ranked fifth in career assists (354), sixth in steals (147) 14th in career scoring (1,400 points), ninth in field goal percentage (38.3 percent), and 16th in rebounds (512). He appeared in 132 games for the Green and Gold, more than any other player in program history. On March 3, 2011, Long earned a spot in the First-team All-CAA.

== Professional career ==
=== Šiauliai (2011–2012) ===
In 2011, Long started his professional career with the Lithuanian team Šiauliai. On February 14, 2012, Long recorded a career-high 31 points, shooting 12-of-19 from the field, along with six rebounds, four assists and two steals in a 99–105 loss to Nevėžis. On March 12, 2012, Long participated in the 2012 LKL Slam Dunk Contest as part of the Lithuanian League All-Star Game event. Long helped Šiauliai reach the 2012 Lithuanian League Playoffs as the third seed, but they eventually were eliminated by Lietuvos rytas in the Semifinals.

=== Le Mans (2012–2013) ===
On June 25, 2012, Long signed with the French team Le Mans for the 2012–13 season. On April 6, 2013, Long recorded a season-high 28 points, shooting 9-of-16 from the field, along with five assists in an 82–89 loss to Cholet Basket. Long helped Le Mans reach the 2013 French League Playoffs as the sixth seed, but they eventually were eliminated by ASVEL Basket.

=== ratiopharm Ulm (2013–2014) ===
On July 13, 2013, Long joined the German team ratiopharm Ulm, signing a one-year deal with an option for another one. Long helped Ulm reach the 2014 German League Quarterfinals, as well as reaching the 2014 German Cup Finals, where they eventually lost to Alba Berlin. On July 10, 2014, Long parted ways with ratiopharm Ulm due to an injury.

=== s.Oliver Würzburg (2015–2016) ===
On July 28, 2015, Long returned to Germany for a second stint, signing a one-year deal with s.Oliver Würzburg after missing the entire 2014–15 season. Long helped Würzburg reach the 2016 German League Playoffs as the eighth seed, where they eventually were eliminated by Brose Bamberg.

=== Steaua Bucharest (2016–2017) ===
On June 14, 2016, Long signed with the Romanian team Steaua București for the 2016–17 season.

=== Maccabi Rishon LeZion (2017) ===
On March 9, 2017, Long parted ways with Steaua to join the Israeli team Maccabi Rishon LeZion for the rest of the season. On April 9, 2017, Long recorded a season-high 28 points, shooting 5-of-8 from the 3-point range, along with three rebounds, two assists and three steals in a 94–87 win over Maccabi Kiryat Gat. Long helped Rishon LeZion reach the 2017 Israeli League Final Four, where they eventually lost to Hapoel Jerusalem.

=== Maccabi Ashdod (2017–2018) ===
On July 23, 2017, Long signed with Maccabi Ashdod for the 2017–18 season. On May 6, 2018, Long logged his first career triple-double in a 92–67 win over Hapoel Gilboa Galil. Long recorded 14 points, 10 rebounds and 10 assists, along with 4 steals. He was subsequently named Israeli League Round 29 MVP. Long helped Ashdod reach the 2018 Israeli League Playoffs as the fourth seed, where they eventually lost to Hapoel Tel Aviv in the Quarterfinals.

=== Return to Rishon LeZion (2018–2019) ===
On July 19, 2018, Long returned to Maccabi Rishon LeZion for a second stint, signing a one-year deal. On October 4, 2018, Long recorded 24 points, seven rebounds and four assists, leading Rishon LeZion to win their first ever Israeli League Cup title after a 78–66 win over Hapoel Be'er Sheva. He was subsequently named the League Cup Tournament MVP. On April 14, 2019, Long recorded a season-high 29 points, shooting 7-of-9 from the field, along with three assists and two steals in a 87–76 win over Hapoel Tel Aviv. Long led Rishon LeZion to the 2019 Israeli League Final, where they eventually lost to Maccabi Tel Aviv.

== Career statistics ==
Legend
GP	Games played	MPG	Minutes per game	FG%	Field goal percentage
3P%	3-point field goal percentage	FT%	Free throw percentage	RPG	Rebounds per game
APG	Assists per game	SPG	Steals per game	BPG	Blocks per game
PPG	Points per game	**Bold**	Career high		Led the league

=== EuroCup ===
Year	Team	GP	GS	MPG	FG%	3P%	FT%	RPG	APG	SPG	BPG	PPG	PIR
2012-13	(France) Le Mans	6	2	25.7	.431	.350	.444	1.5	1.3	1.0	.1	9.1	10.5
2013-14	(Germany) Ulm	16	15	26.5	.444	.377	.750	1.8	3.0	.8	0	10.6	13.5

=== Domestic Leagues ===
Year	Team	League	GP	MPG	FG%	3P%	FT%	RPG	APG	SPG	BPG	PPG
2011–12	(Lithuania) Šiauliai	LKL	29	27.8	**.486**	**.409**	**.819**	3.3	3.3	**2.1**	.0	13.8
2012–13	(France) Le Mans	Pro A	33	29.3	.409	.327	.759	2.0	2.3	1.1	.1	11.9
2013–14	(Germany) Ulm	BBL	34	26.1	.426	.322	.772	2.3	2.4	.7	.0	11.4
2015–16	(Germany) Würzburg	BBL	35	25.4	.446	.356	.804	2.7	3.1	.8	.0	9.8
2016–17	(Romania) Steaua	Divizia A	20	31.9	.429	.355	.714	**4.6**	**5.4**	1.8	.1	12.3
2017	(Israel) Rishon LeZion	IBPL	18	29.6	.461	.402	.767	4.1	3.2	2.0	.0	12.1
2017–18	(Israel) Ashdod	IBPL	36	31.5	.415	.321	.711	4.5	3.7	2.0	.1	13.3
2018–19	(Israel) Rishon LeZion	IBPL	**37**	**32.7**	.424	.364	.747	3.6	4.1	1.3	.1	**15.9**

Source: RealGM
