= Murphy Holloway =

American basketball player (born 1990)

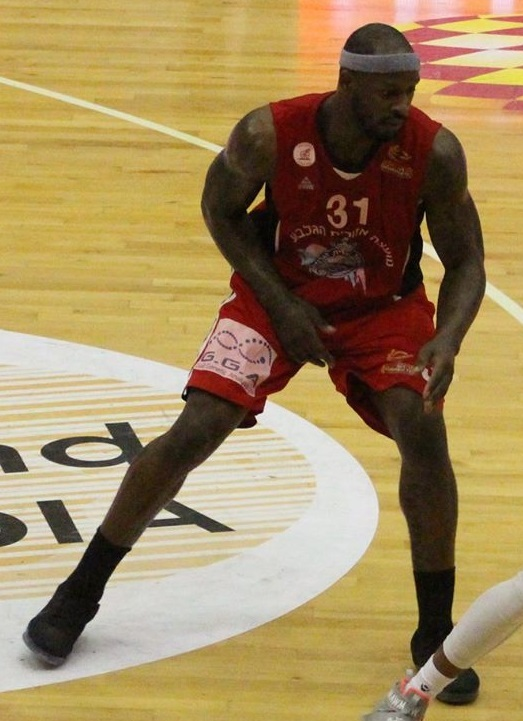
- Holloway with Hapoel Gilboa Galil in March 2017

Free agent
- Position: Center / power forward

Personal information
- Born: April 24, 1990 (age 36) Irmo, South Carolina, U.S.
- Listed height: 6 ft 7 in (2.01 m)
- Listed weight: 240 lb (109 kg)

Career information
- High school: Dutch Fork (Irmo, South Carolina)
- College: Ole Miss (2008–2013)
- NBA draft: 2013: undrafted
- Playing career: 2013–present

Career history
- 2013: Büyükçekmece
- 2013–2014: Ironi Kiryat Ata
- 2014: Hapoel Kfar Saba
- 2014–2015: Trieste
- 2015–2016: Cholet
- 2016–2017: Hapoel Gilboa Galil
- 2017: GlobalPort Batang Pier
- 2017–2018: Maccabi Rishon LeZion
- 2018–2020: Incheon ET Land Elephants
- 2020: Al-Muharraq SC
- 2021: s.Oliver Würzburg
- 2021–2022: Goyang Orions
- 2022–2023: Daegu KOGAS Pegasus

Career highlights
- Israeli League Cup champion (2018); Second-team All-SEC (2013); South Carolina Mr. Basketball (2008)

Murphy McQuite Holloway (born April 24, 1990) is an American professional basketball player who last played for the Daegu KOGAS Pegasus of the Korean Basketball League. A power forward/center, he played college basketball for University of Mississippi before playing professionally in Turkey, Israel, Italy, France, the Philippines, South Korea, Bahrain, and Germany.

== Early life and college career ==
Holloway attended Dutch Fork High School in Irmo, South Carolina, where he was named South Carolina Gatorade Player of the Year, 4A Player of the Year and Mr. Basketball as a senior. Holloway became the leading scorer in Dutch Fork history with 1,487 career points, he averaged 28 points, 15 rebounds and 4 blocks as a senior.

Holloway played four years of college basketball for the University of Mississippi, where he averaged 14.5 points, 9.7 rebounds and 1.6 steals per game as a senior. Holoway was named to the SEC All-Tournament Team and SEC All-Second Team.

== Professional career ==
In September 2013, Holloway started his professional career with the Turkish team Büyükçekmece Basketbol.

In December 2013, Holloway signed with the Israeli team Ironi Kiryat Ata for the 2014–15 season. However, he was released by the team due to injury. One month later, he signed with Hapoel Kfar Saba for the rest of the season.

On August 23, 2014, Holloway signed with the Italian team Pallacanestro Trieste for the 2014–15 season.

On July 4, 2015, Holloway signed with the French team Cholet Basket for the 2015–16 season.

On June 17, 2016, Holloway returned to Israel for a second stint, signing a one-year deal with Hapoel Gilboa Galil. Holloway led the league in efficiency rating (20.5 per game) and was the second-leading rebounder with 9.9 per game.

On July 22, 2017, Holloway signed with the Philippine team GlobalPort Batang Pierfor the rest of the 2016–17 PBA season, joining as a replacement for Jabril Trawick. On July 30, 2017, Holloway recorded a career-high 36 points, shooting 17-of-30 from the field, along with 18 rebounds in a 108–124 loss to the Barangay Ginebra Kings.

On September 27, 2017, Holloway returned to Israel for a third stint, signing with Maccabi Rishon LeZion for the 2017–18 season. On February 18, 2018, Holloway recorded a season-high 28 points, shooting 12-of-14 from the field, along with 13 rebounds, 5 steals and 3 assists in a 97–102 loss to the Hapoel Holon. During the season, Holloway was named two-time MVP of the Round. Holloway finished the season as the league fourth-leading rebounder with 8.5 per game and fourth in efficiency rating with 20.1 per game.

On August 7, 2018, Holloway signed with the Incheon ET Land Elephants of the Korean Basketball League. In 17 games played for the Elephants, he averaged 18.1 points, 13 rebounds and 1.9 blocks.

On July 7, 2019, Holloway re-signed with the Incheon ET Land Elephants for the 2019–20 season.

On November 25, 2020, Holloway signed with Al-Muharraq SC.

On February 9, 2021, Holloway signed with s.Oliver Würzburg for the rest of the 2020–21 season. He averaged 11.1 points, 4.9 rebounds, 1.5 assists and 1.4 steals per game. On August 20, 2021, Holloway signed with the Goyang Orions of the Korean Basketball League.

== The Basketball Tournament ==
In 2017, Holloway played for Ole Hotty Toddy, a team of Ole Miss alumni, in The Basketball Tournament. Holloway's team was upset in the first round by Team NC Prodigal Sons. The Basketball Tournament is an annual $2 million winner-take-all tournament broadcast on ESPN.

In TBT 2018, Holloway suited up for Armored Athlete. In 3 games, he averaged 8.3 points, 9 rebounds, and shot 67 percent from the field. Armored Athlete reached the Super 16 before falling to Boeheim's Army.

== Career statistics ==
Legend
GP	Games played	MPG	Minutes per game	FG%	Field goal percentage
3P%	3-point field goal percentage	FT%	Free throw percentage	RPG	Rebounds per game
APG	Assists per game	SPG	Steals per game	BPG	Blocks per game
PPG	Points per game	**Bold**	Career high		Led the league

=== Domestic Leagues ===
Year	Team	League	GP	MPG	FG%	3P%	FT%	RPG	APG	SPG	BPG	PPG
2014–15	(Italy) Pallacanestro Trieste	Serie A2	37	30.8	.507	.208	.533	8.1	1.5	1.5	1.3	17.1
2015–16	(France) Cholet	Pro A	31	25.8	.582	.273	.585	6.7	1.2	1.1	.5	13.1
2016–17	(Israel) Hapoel Gilboa Galil	IPL	24	30.0	.545	.111	.593	9.9	2.1	1.4	.8	15.9
2017	(Philippines) GlobalPort Batang Pier	PBA	8	42.2	.532	.316	.519	17.7	3.6	2.8	2.7	27.0
2017–18	(Israel) Maccabi Rishon LeZion	IPL	33	29.1	.592	.0	.607	8.5	2.3	1.4	.7	13.5
2018–19	(South Korea) Incheon ET Land Elephants	KBL	17	31.9	.568	.0	.432	13.0	3.0	1.7	1.9	18.1

Source: RealGM
