= Mark Lyons =

American basketball player (born 1989)

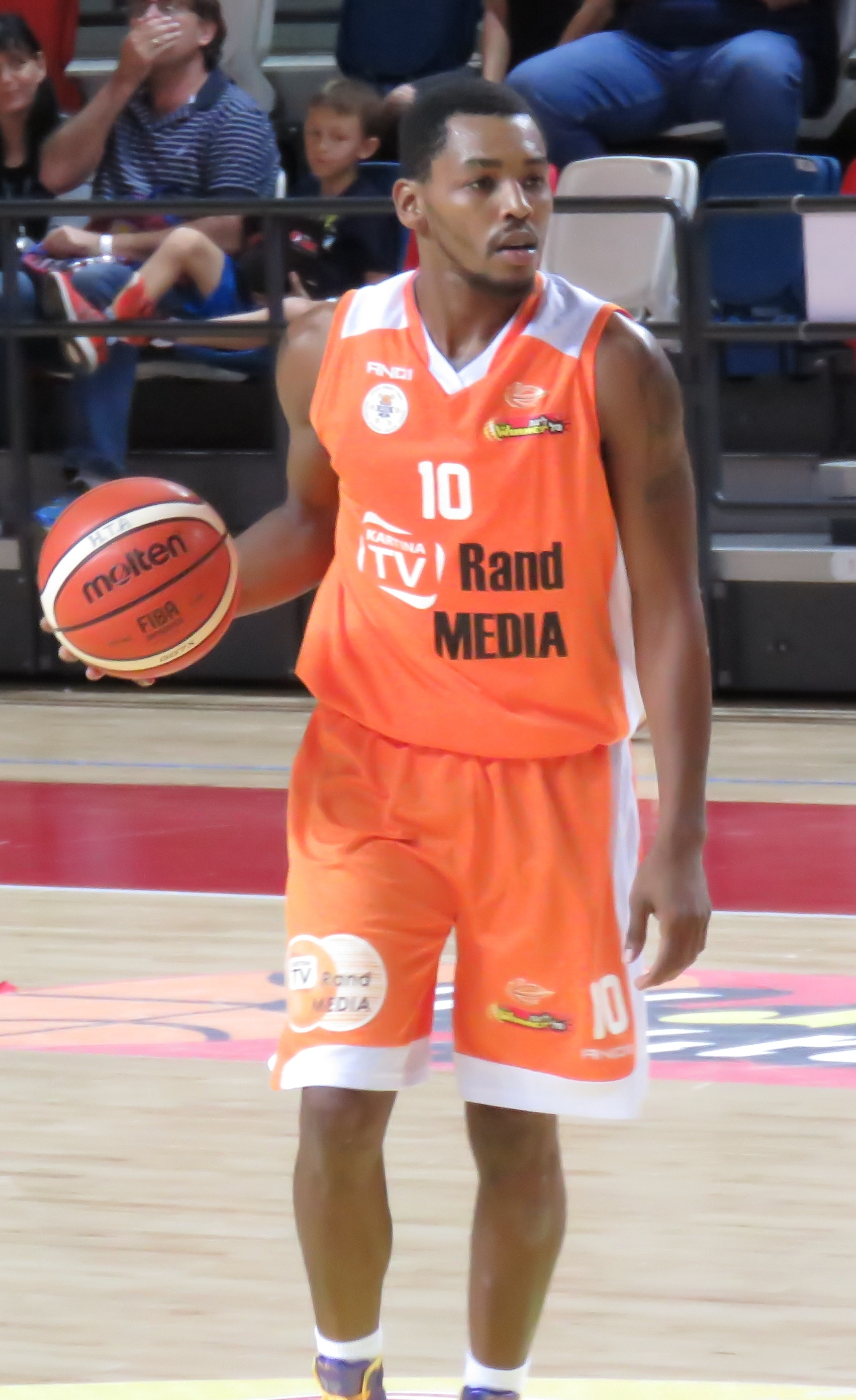
- Lyons with Maccabi Rishon LeZion in 2015

No. 10 – Petrojet
- Position: Point guard
- League: BAL; Egyptian Premier League

Personal information
- Born: July 4, 1989 (age 37) Albany, New York, U.S.
- Listed height: 6 ft 1 in (1.85 m)
- Listed weight: 200 lb (91 kg)

Career information
- High school: Schenectady (Schenectady, New York); Brewster Academy (Wolfeboro, New Hampshire)
- College: Xavier (2009–2012); Arizona (2012–2013)
- NBA draft: 2013: undrafted
- Playing career: 2013–present

Career history
- 2013–2014: Chorale Roanne
- 2014: Zadar
- 2014–2015: Ironi Nahariya
- 2015–2016: Maccabi Rishon LeZion
- 2016: Muratbey Uşak Sportif
- 2016–2017: Hapoel Tel Aviv
- 2017: Guizhou White Tigers
- 2017–2018: Gaziantep Basketbol
- 2018: Enisey
- 2018–2019: Sporting Al Riyadi Beirut
- 2019: VL Pesaro
- 2019–2020: Hapoel Tel Aviv
- 2020–2021: Piratas de Quebradillas
- 2021: Charilaos Trikoupis
- 2021–2022: Balıkesir Büyükşehir Belediye
- 2022: Elitzur Ashkelon
- 2023: Al Hilal
- 2024–present: Al Ahly

Career highlights
- Israeli League champion (2016); 2× Israeli League All-Star (2015, 2017); 2× Israeli League Top Scorer (2015, 2017); Lebanese Supercup winner (2018); First-team All-Pac-12 (2013); 2× Third-team All-Atlantic 10 (2011, 2012)
- Stats at Basketball Reference

Mark Steven Lyons (born July 4, 1989) is an American professional basketball player for Al Ahly of the Egyptian Basketball Premier League and the Basketball Africa League (BAL). He played college basketball for Xavier and Arizona before playing professionally in countries including France, Croatia, Israel, Turkey, China, Russia, Lebanon, Italy and Saudi Arabia.

== College career ==
Lyons redshirted his freshman year at Xavier. In three seasons at Xavier, Lyons was on two Sweet 16 teams and two Atlantic 10 Conference champions and scored almost 1,200 career points. As a junior, Lyons averaged 15.1 points and 2.8 assists per game while shooting 39.2 percent from behind the arc. He was suspended for two games due to his involvement in the 2011 Crosstown Shootout brawl.

In May 2012, Lyons announced that he was transferring to Arizona for his final collegiate season. Arizona's coach, Sean Miller, had previously coached Xavier and had recruited Lyons to the school. He was named Pac-12 Player of the Week on January 21, 2013. Lyons was selected to the Pac-12 All-Conference First Team in his only season at Arizona after averaging a team-high 14.9 points and 2.97 assists per game.

== Professional career ==
=== 2013–14 season ===
After going undrafted in the 2013 NBA draft, Lyons joined the Toronto Raptors for the 2013 NBA Summer League. On July 7, 2013, he signed a one-year deal with Chorale Roanne of the LNB Pro A. However, on January 9, 2014, he parted ways with Roanne after appearing in 14 games. He later signed with Zadar of Croatia for the rest of the season on February 10. In 14 league games for Zadar, he averaged 17.1 points, 2.6 rebounds and 2.9 assists per game.

=== 2014–15 season ===
On September 9, 2014, Lyons signed with Spirou Charleroi of the Belgian Pro League. On October 7, 2014, Lyons parted ways with Charleroi before appearing in a game of them. One day later, Lyons signed a one-year deal with Ironi Nahariya of the Israeli Premier League. On March 3, 2015, Lyons participated in the Israeli League All-Star game and won the Slam Dunk contest during the same event. In 33 games played for Nahariya, he led the league in scoring with 18.4 points, to go with 2.8 rebounds, 4.7 assists and 1.9 steals per game.

=== 2015–16 season ===
On July 25, 2015, Lyons signed with Maccabi Rishon LeZion for the 2015–16 season. On January 31, 2016, Lyons recorded a double-double with a season-high 29 points and 11 assists, shooting 12-of-20 from the field, along with three rebounds in a 94–100 loss to Maccabi Tel Aviv. In 54 games played during the 2015–16 season, he averaged 16.5 points, 2.2 rebounds and 4.8 assists per game. Lyons won the 2016 Israeli League championship title with Rishon LeZion.

=== 2016–17 season ===
On August 1, 2016, Lyons signed a one-year deal with Muratbey Uşak Sportif of the Turkish Super League. On December 8, 2016, he parted ways with Uşak after averaging 14.8 points and 6.9 assists in BSL and 16.1 points and 5.9 assists in the FIBA Champions League.

On December 27, 2016, Lyons returned to Israel for a second stint, signing with Hapoel Tel Aviv for the rest of the season. On February 19, 2017, Lyons recorded a season-high 35 points, shooting 8-of-11 from three-point range, along with four rebounds and six assists in a 92–71 win over his former team Ironi Nahariya. In 21 games played for Hapoel, he led the league in scoring for the second time in three years by averaging 20.1 points per game.

=== 2017–18 season ===
On June 9, 2017, Lyons signed with Guizhou White Tigers of China for the 2017 NBL season. On August 13, 2017, Lyons recorded a career-high 60 points, shooting 12-of-18 from three-point range, along with eight assists in a 136–129 win over Henan. In 26 games played for Guizhou, he averaged 35.3 points, 4.2 rebounds and 4.8 assists per game.

On July 15, 2017, Lyons returned to Turkey for a second stint, signing a one-year deal with Gaziantep Basketbol. On October 28, 2017, Lyons recorded a season-high 30 points, shooting 11-of-17 from the field, along with five rebounds and three assists in a 118–119 double-overtime loss to Eskişehir Basket.

On January 17, 2018, Lyons parted ways with Gaziantep to join Enisey for the rest of the season.

=== 2018–19 season ===
On August 9, 2018, Lyons signed a one-year deal with Sporting Al Riyadi Beirut of the Lebanese League. In 12 games played for Al Riyadi, he averaged an impressive 17.6 points per game, along with 3.1 assists per game. Lyons won the 2018 Lebanese Supercup title with Al Riyadi.

On February 19, 2019, Lyons parted ways with Al Riyadi Beirut to join VL Pesaro of Italy for the rest of the season.

=== 2019–20 season ===
On September 29, 2019, Lyons returned to Hapoel Tel Aviv for a second stint, signing a one-year deal. He averaged 11.6 points, 1.8 rebounds, 5.1 assists and 1.2 steals per game.

=== 2020–21 season ===
On September 25, 2020, Lyons signed with the Piratas de Quebradillas of the Baloncesto Superior Nacional. On March 3, 2021, Lyons signed with Greek club Charilaos Trikoupis for the rest of the season, replacing Devonte Green. He averaged 13.6 points, 3.1 assists, and 2.1 rebounds per game.

=== 2021–22 season ===
On July 30, 2021, Lyons signed with Balıkesir Büyükşehir Belediye of the Turkish Basketball First League (TBL). He averaged 21.5 points, 6.4 assists, and 2.6 rebounds per game. On February 22, 2022, Lyons signed with Elitzur Ashkelon of the Israeli National League.

=== 2023–24 season ===
For the 2023–24 season, Lyons joined the defending Egyptian champions Al Ahly. He won the Egyptian SuperCup and Mortabet tournament earlier in 2023, then made his debut in the Basketball Africa League (BAL) on April 19, 2024, when he scored 14 points in a 99–76 win over City Oilers in the opening day of the 2024 season.

== The Basketball Tournament ==
Mark Lyons played for Team Fancy in the 2018 edition of The Basketball Tournament. In 2 games, he averaged 8 points, 1.5 assists, and 1.5 rebounds per game. Team Fancy reached the second round before falling to Boeheim's Army. Lyons is currently playing for Team Zip Em Up with other Xavier alumni in the 2021 tournament.
