= Jonathan Skjöldebrand =

Swedish-Israeli basketball player

Personal information
- Born: August 2, 1983 (age 43) Amirim, Israel
- Listed height: 204 cm (6 ft 8 in)
- Listed weight: 100 kg (220 lb)

Career information
- NBA draft: 2005: undrafted
- Playing career: 2002–2021
- Position: Power forward

Career history
- 2002–2003: A.S. Ramat HaSharon
- 2003–2005: Hapoel Galil Elyon
- 2005–2006: Hapoel Haifa
- 2006–2007: Södertälje Kings
- 2007: Kouvot
- 2007–2008: Södertälje Kings
- 2008–2009: Clínicas Rincón Axarquía
- 2009–2010: Södertälje Kings
- 2010: Club Melilla Baloncesto
- 2011–2015: Hapoel Tel Aviv
- 2015–2016: Maccabi Ashdod
- 2016–2018: Ironi Nahariya
- 2018–2021: Hapoel Eilat
- 2021: Hapoel Tel Aviv

Career highlights
- All-Israeli League Second Team (2017); 2× Israeli League All-Star (2016, 2017)

Jonathan Skjöldebrand (Hebrew: יהונתן שולדבראנד; born August 2, 1983) is a former Swedish-Israeli professional basketball player.

== Early life ==
Skjöldebrand was born in Amirim, Israel to Swedish parents, he played for Hapoel Sasa and Hapoel Galil Elyon youth teams. His dad is a Swedish Jew and his mom is a non-Jewish Swede.

== Professional career ==
On August 28, 2011, Skjöldebrand signed with Hapoel Tel Aviv. In his first season with Hapoel, they were promoted to the Israeli Premier League.

On December 2, 2012, Skjöldebrand filed verbal abuse against Guy Pnini who used curse words and racial comments towards him during a game between Hapoel and Maccabi Tel Aviv.

On July 1, 2013, Skjöldebrand signed a two-year contract extension with Hapoel Tel Aviv.

On August 31, 2015, Skjöldebrand parted ways with Hapoel and signed a one-year contract with Maccabi Ashdod. On February 7, 2016, Skjöldebrand recorded a career-high 28 points, shooting 8-of-8 from three-point range, along with five rebounds and three assists in an 84–88 loss to Maccabi Kiryat Gat. Skjöldebrand helped Ashdod reach the 2016 Israeli State Cup Final where they eventually lost to Maccabi Tel Aviv.

On June 30, 2016, Skjöldebrand signed with Ironi Nahariya for the 2016–17 season. On April 18, 2017, Skjöldebrand participated in the 2017 Israeli All-Star Game and the Three-point shootout during the same event. Skjöldebrand helped Nahariya reach the 2017 FIBA Europe Cup Quarterfinals and the 2017 Israeli League Playoffs. On June 9, 2017, Skjöldebrand was named 2017 All-Israeli League Second Team.

On July 11, 2017, Skjöldebrand signed a two-year contract extension with Nahariya. On September 9, 2017, Skjöldebrand was named Nahariya's team captain. In 33 games played during the 2017–18 season, Skjöldebrand averaged 10.1 points, 3.4 rebounds and 1.4 assists, shooting 48.4 percent from three-point range.

On July 4, 2018, Skjöldebrand signed with Hapoel Eilat for the 2018–19 season. On May 16, 2019, Skjöldebrand scored a three-pointer at the buzzer to give Eilat a 74–73 win over Bnei Herzliya, sending Herzliya to the Israeli National League. Skjöldebrand helped Eilat reach the 2019 Israeli League Final Four, where they eventually lost to Maccabi Tel Aviv in the Semifinals.

On August 27, 2019, Skjöldebrand signed a two-year contract extension with Eilat.

On August 14, 2021, he has signed with Hapoel Tel Aviv of the Israeli Premier League.

== Swedish national team ==
Skjöldebrand was a member of the Swedish national team at EuroBasket 2013.

== Personal life ==
His father, Lorentz Skjöldebrand, is a Swedish former basketball player who played in Israel.
