= Marquis Wright =

American basketball player

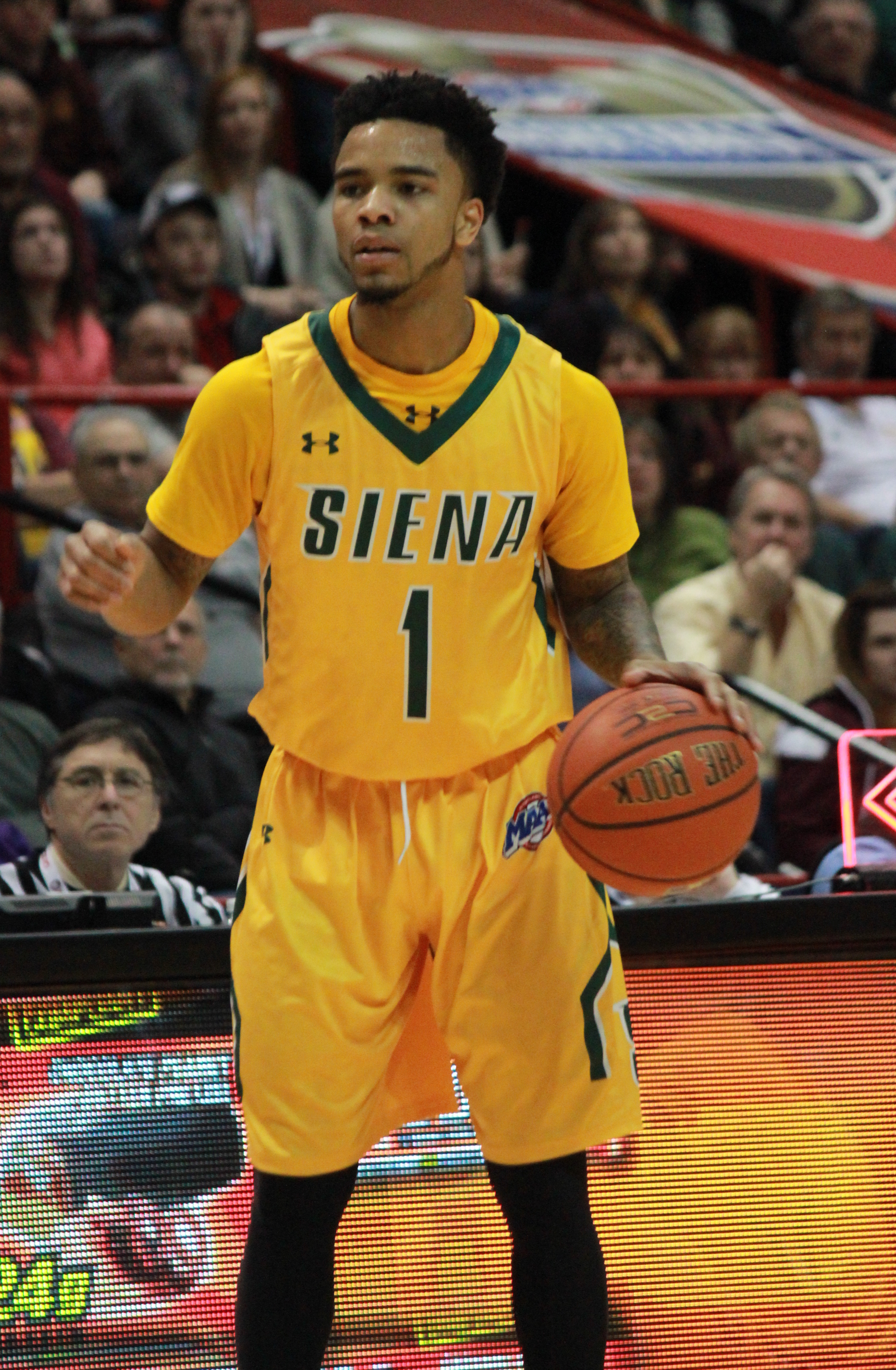

Free Agent
- Position: Point guard

Personal information
- Born: July 5, 1995 (age 31)
- Listed height: 6 ft 1 in (1.85 m)
- Listed weight: 170 lb (77 kg)

Career information
- High school: North Point (Waldorf, Maryland)
- College: Siena (2013–2017)
- NBA draft: 2017: undrafted
- Playing career: 2017–present

Career history
- 2017–2018: Egis Körmend
- 2018: Maccabi Rishon LeZion
- 2019–2020: Denain Voltaire
- 2020–2021: CBet Prienai
- 2021: U-BT Cluj-Napoca
- 2021: Boulazac
- 2021–2022: Alliance Sport Alsace
- 2022: Leones de Santo Domingo
- 2022–2023: Samsunspor Basketbol
- 2023: Fuerza Regia
- 2023–2024: Balıkesir BŞB
- 2024–2025: Gaziantep Basketbol

Career highlights
- Romanian League Champion (2021); Israeli League Cup winner (2018); Hungarian League All-Star (2018); Second-team All-MAAC (2017)

Marquis Jurell Wright (born July 5, 1995) is an American professional basketball player who last played for Gaziantep Basketbol of the Turkish Basketball First League (TBL). He played college basketball for Siena College before playing professionally in Hungary, Israel, Romania, France, Dominican Republic and Turkey.

== Early life and college career ==
Wright attended North Point High School in Waldorf, Maryland, where he averaged 16.6 points, 6.1 assists, 4.7 rebounds and 3.9 steals, leading the Eagles to a 24–3 record and a state semifinal appearance as a senior.

On March 21, 2013, Wright was named co-Maryland Gatorade Player of the Year, alongside Kris Jenkins.

Wright played college basketball for Siena College's Saints. On February 13, 2017, Wright recorded a college career-high 36 points, shooting 6-of-11 from 3-point range, along with three assists in an 82–102 loss to Monmouth.

In his senior year at Siena, Wright averaged 16.8 points, 4.1 rebounds and 5 assists and 1.1 steals per game and led the Saints to the MAAC Tournament Championship Game for the first time in seven years. Wright finished his college career as the third all-time at Siena in assists (614), fifth in steals (199) and 10th in points (1,546).

On February 27, 2017, Wright earned a spot in the All-MAAC Second-team.

== Professional career ==
On July 18, 2017, Wright started his professional career with the Hungarian team Egis Körmend, signing a one-year deal. On December 2, 2017, Wright participated in the 2018 Hungarian League All-Star Game. On March 17, 2018, Wright recorded a season-high 24 points, shooting 8-of-11 from the field, along with nine rebounds and five assists in a 77–72 win over Szedeák.

In 48 games played during the 2017–18 season (played in the FIBA Europe Cup and the Hungarian League), Wright averaged 11.7 points, 4.1 rebounds, 4.7 assists and 1.1 steals per game. Wright led Körmend to the 2018 Hungarian League Playoffs as the fourth seed, but they eventually were eliminated by Szolnoki Olaj in the Semifinals.

On August 17, 2018, Wright signed with the Israeli team Maccabi Rishon LeZion for the 2018–19 season. In October 2018, Wright won the 2018 Israeli League Cup with Rishon LeZion after averaging 10.7 points and 4.2 assists in the tournament. However, on November 26, 2018, Wright parted ways with Rishon LeZion after appearing in seven Israeli League games.

On July 25, 2019, Wright signed a one-year deal with Denain Voltaire of the French LNB Pro B. In 23 games, he averaged 12.2 points, 2.8 rebounds, 5.9 assists and 1.3 steals per game.

On July 24, 2020, Wright signed with CBet Prienai of the Lithuanian Basketball League.

After a brief stint in Romania with U-BT Cluj-Napoca, Wright signed with Boulazac Basket Dordogne of the LNB Pro B on August 14, 2021.

On November 7, 2021, Wright signed with Alliance Sport Alsace of the LNB Pro B.

On July 5, 2022, Wright signed with Leones de Santo Domingo of the Liga Nacional de Baloncesto.

On August 30, 2022, Wright signed with Samsunspor Basketbol of the Turkish Basketball First League.

On June 21, 2024, he signed with Gaziantep Basketbol of the Turkish Basketball First League (TBL).
