= Deshawn Stephens =

American basketball player (born 1989)

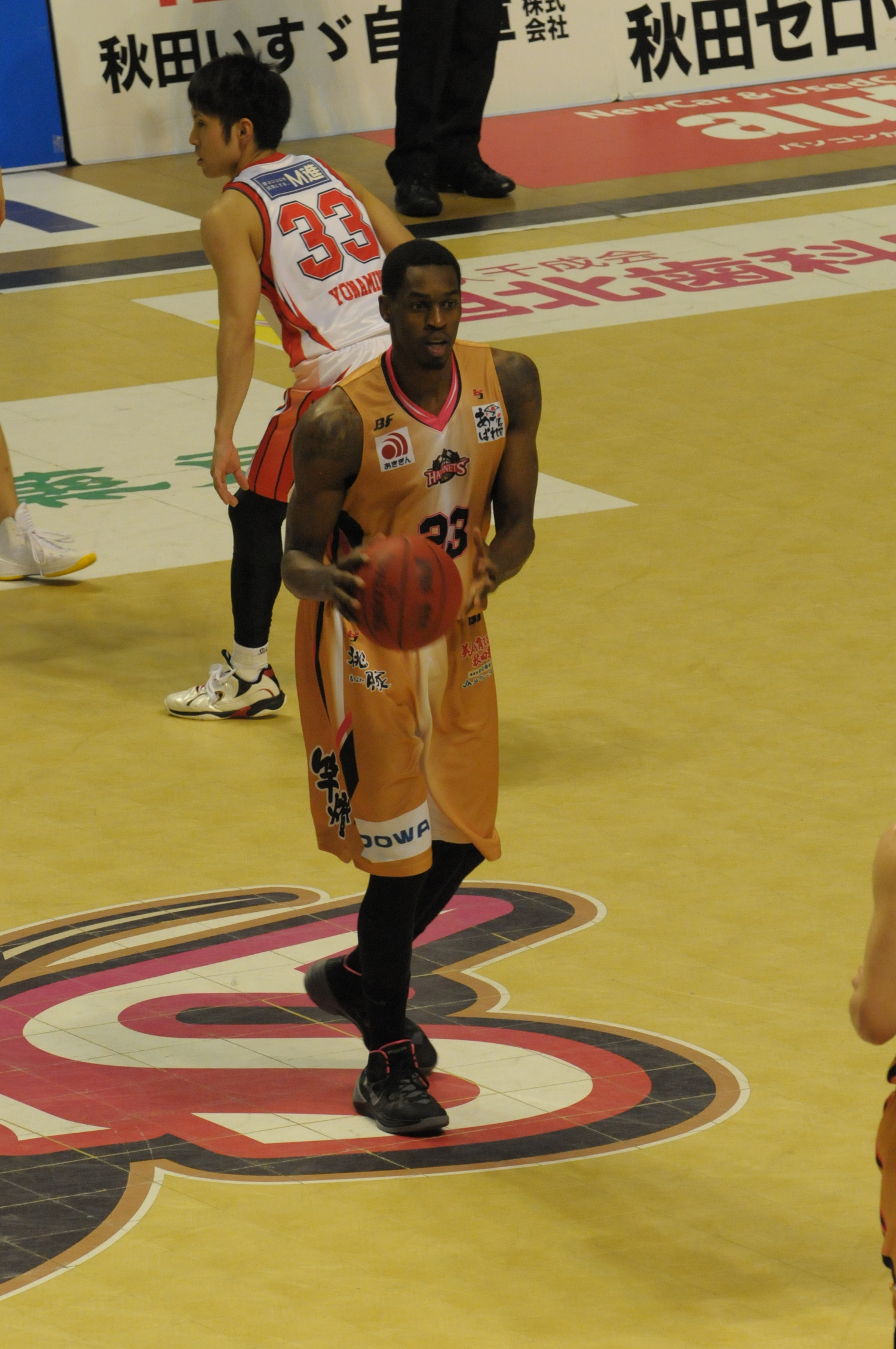
- Stephens with the Akita Northern Happinets

No. 23 – Rimini
- Position: Center
- League: Serie A2

Personal information
- Born: October 9, 1989 (age 37) Los Angeles, California, U.S.
- Listed height: 6 ft 8 in (2.03 m)
- Listed weight: 225 lb (102 kg)

Career information
- High school: Chatsworth (Los Angeles, California)
- College: Santa Monica College (2009–2011); San Diego State (2011–2013)
- NBA draft: 2013: undrafted
- Playing career: 2013–present

Career history
- 2013–2014: Hamamatsu Phoenix
- 2014–2015: Akita Northern Happinets
- 2015: Banvit
- 2015: Bandırma Kırmızı
- 2016: Châlons-Reims
- 2016–2017: Akita Northern Happinets
- 2017: Los Angeles D-Fenders
- 2017–2018: Cagliari
- 2018: Trotamundos de Carabobo
- 2018–2019: Maccabi Rishon LeZion
- 2019: Hapoel Tel Aviv
- 2019: Fortitudo Bologna
- 2019–2020: Scafati Basket
- 2020–2021: Bakken Bears
- 2021–2022: Igokea
- 2022–2023: Dinamo Sassari
- 2023–2024: Promitheas Patras
- 2024–2025: U-BT Cluj-Napoca
- 2025: Treviso
- 2025–2026: Forlì 2.015
- 2026–present: Rimini

Career highlights
- Romanian Liga Națională winner (2025); Bosnian League champion (2022); Israeli League Cup winner (2018); Bosnian Cup winner (2022); bj league Slam Dunk Contest winner (2015)

Deshawn Stephens (born October 9, 1989) is an American professional basketball player for Rinascita Basket Rimini of the Italian Serie A2. He played college basketball for Santa Monica College and San Diego State before playing professionally in Japan, Turkey, France, Italy, Israel, Greece, and Romania.

== College career ==
Stephens began his college career at Santa Monica College. As a sophomore, he led the Corsairs to a 20–8 record and the Western State Conference championship. Stephens was a Western State-South Division Conference first-team all-league selection. In 2011, he transferred to San Diego State. In two seasons with the Aztecs he averaged 5.6 points and 5 rebounds in 20.2 minutes per game.

== College statistics ==
Year	Team	GP	GS	MPG	FG%	3P%	FT%	RPG	APG	SPG	BPG	PPG
2011–12	San Diego State	34	3	18.7	.608	.000	.397	4.88	032	0.35	0.29	5.21
2012–13	San Diego State	34	34	21.7	.593	.000	.507	5.09	0.24	0.62	0.50	6.06
Career		68	37	20.2	.600	.000	.454	4.99	0.28	0.49	0.40	5.63

== Professional career ==
=== 2013–14 season ===
After going undrafted in the 2013 NBA draft, Stephens signed with the Hamamatsu Higashimikawa Phoenix of the Japanese bj league. In 27 games for Hamamatsu, he averaged 9.1 points and 5.9 rebounds. On February 5, 2014, Stephens was released by the Phoenix. Two days later, he signed with the Akita Northern Happinets of the bj league. In 26 games for Akita, Stephens averaged 11.7 points and 7.2 rebounds.

=== 2014–15 season ===
Stephens stayed with the Northern Happinets for the 2014–15 season. In 53 games he averaged 14.4 points, 8.6 rebounds and 1.6 assists. Akita lost in the bj league finals to Stephens' former team, Hamamatsu Higashimikawa Phoenix, 71 - 69. He led all players with 30 points on 12-for-13 shooting from the field and grabbed 10 rebounds.

=== 2015–16 season ===
On September 15, 2015, Stephens signed with the Bandırma Kırmızı of the TBL. In October 2015, he made a move to the Banvit B.K. of the BSL. On January 4, 2016, Stephens left Turkey and signed with the Champagne Châlons-Reims of the French LNB Pro A In 19 games for Champagne Châlons-Reims he averaged 8.9 points and 3.8 rebounds in 21.6 minutes.

=== 2016–17 season ===
On July 28, 2016, Stephens signed with the Akita Northern Happinets, returning to the club for a second stint. On March 9, 2017, Stephens was acquired by the Los Angeles D-Fenders of the NBA Development League.

=== 2017–18 season ===
On August 4, 2017, Stephens signed with the Italian team Cagliari Dinamo Academy of the Serie A2 Basket. On December 3, 2017, Stephens recorded a career-high 34 points, shooting 15-of-18 from the field, along with twelve rebounds and two assists in a 93–94 loss to Cuore di Napoli.

=== 2018–19 season ===
On July 29, 2018, Stephens signed with the Israeli team Maccabi Rishon LeZion for the 2018–19 season. In October 2018, Stephens helped Rishon LeZion to win the 2018 Israeli League Cup. On April 7, 2019, Stephens parted ways with Rishon LeZion to join Hapoel Tel Aviv for the rest of the season. Stephens helped Hapoel reach the 2019 Israeli League Playoffs, where they eventually were eliminated by Maccabi Tel Aviv in the Quarterfinals.

=== 2019–20 season ===
On September 18, 2019, he has signed with Fortitudo Bologna of the Italian Lega Basket Serie A (LBA).

=== 2020–21 season ===
On July 11, 2020, he has signed with Bakken Bears of Denmark's Basketligaen.

=== 2021–22 season ===
On June 11, 2021, he has signed with Igokea of the Bosnian League.

=== 2022–23 season ===
On November 11, 2022, he signed with Dinamo Sassari of the Italian Lega Basket Serie A (LBA).

=== 2023–24 season ===
On July 22, 2023, Stephens signed with Greek club Promitheas Patras.

=== 2024–2025 ===
On August 12, 2024, Stephens signed with Romanian club U-BT Cluj-Napoca.

=== 2025–present ===
On June 26, 2025, he signed with Treviso Basket of the Lega Basket Serie A (LBA).

== The Basketball Tournament ==
In the summers of 2015 and 2017, Stephens played in The Basketball Tournament on ESPN for Team Challenge ALS. He competed for the $2 million prize in 2017, and for Team Challenge ALS, he averaged 5.6 points per game. Stephens helped take the sixth-seeded Team Challenge ALS to the Championship Game of the tournament, where they lost in a close game to Overseas Elite 86–83.

In TBT 2018, Stephens averaged 8.5 points per game, 5.5 rebounds per game and shot 91 percent from the free-throw line for Team Challenge ALS. They reached the West Regional Championship Game before losing to eventual tournament runner-up Eberlein Drive.

== Personal life ==
His father died when he was six years old. His mother, Beverly Triggs, is a licensed vocational nurse. He married in July 2021 to Iris Truley.

== Career statistics ==
Legend
GP	Games played	MPG	Minutes per game	FG%	Field goal percentage
3P%	3-point field goal percentage	FT%	Free throw percentage	RPG	Rebounds per game
APG	Assists per game	SPG	Steals per game	BPG	Blocks per game
PPG	Points per game	**Bold**	Career high		Led the league

=== Regular season ===
Year	Team	League	GP	MPG	FG%	3P%	FT%	RPG	APG	SPG	BPG	PPG
2013–14	(Japan) Hamamatsu Phoenix	bj League	27	21.0	.490	.185	.577	6.0	1.3	1.1	.4	9.1
2013–14	(Japan) Akita Northern Happinets	bj League	20	23.5	**.677**	.0	.400	7.8	1.4	.5	.5	12.5
2014–15	(Japan) Akita Northern Happinets	bj League	**47**	24.7	.585	.333	**.626**	8.8	**1.6**	.9	.6	14.3
2015–16	(Turkey) Banvit	BSL	4	6.8	.222	.0	.500	1.7	.2	.2	.2	1.2
2015–16	(Turkey) Banvit	EuroCup	5	8.2	.643	.0	.600	3.0	.2	.0	.0	4.2
2015–16	(Turkey) Bandirma Kirmizi	TBL	7	**34.3**	.512	.333	.480	**10.1**	1.4	**1.4**	**1.2**	15.2
2015–16	(France) Châlons-Reims	Pro A	19	21.6	.545	.167	.558	3.8	.8	.5	.1	8.9
2016–17	(Japan) Akita Northern Happinets	B.League	41	20.9	.581	.300	.529	7.2	.7	.7	.5	10.3
2016–17	(United States) Los Angeles D-Fenders	NBDL	10	18.9	.603	.0	.588	5.5	.5	.3	.7	8.0
2017–18	(Italy) Cagliari	Serie A2	28	32.6	.599	.381	.567	8.4	1.3	.5	.4	**16.0**
2017–18	(Venezuela) Trotamundos	LPB	6	25.5	.589	**.400**	.500	6.8	1.3	.8	.1	12.5
2018-19	(Israel) Maccabi Rishon LeZion	IPL	24	25.9	.566	.289	.440	5.3	1.2	.9	.5	11.3
2018-19	(Israel) Hapoel Tel Aviv	IPL	9	20.1	.544	.000	.417	4.6	.2	1.0	.4	7.4
2019–20	(Italy) Bologna	Serie A	5	20.6	.733	.000	.286	4.0	.6	.4	1.4	9.6
2019–20	(Italy) Scafati	Serie A2										

Source: RealGM

=== Playoffs ===
Year	Team	GP	GS	MPG	FG%	3P%	FT%	RPG	APG	SPG	BPG	PPG
2013-14	Akita	6	0	17.67	.571	.000	.640	5.5	1.0	0.17	0.33	9.0
2016-17	SBL	3	0	14.6	.538	.000	1.000	2.33	0.00	0.00	1.33	5.33
2018-19	Hapoel	3		16.3	.222	.000	.000	4.3	0.0	1.0	0.0	1.3

Source: ディショーン・スティーブンス
