= Mickey Gorka =

Israeli basketball player and coach

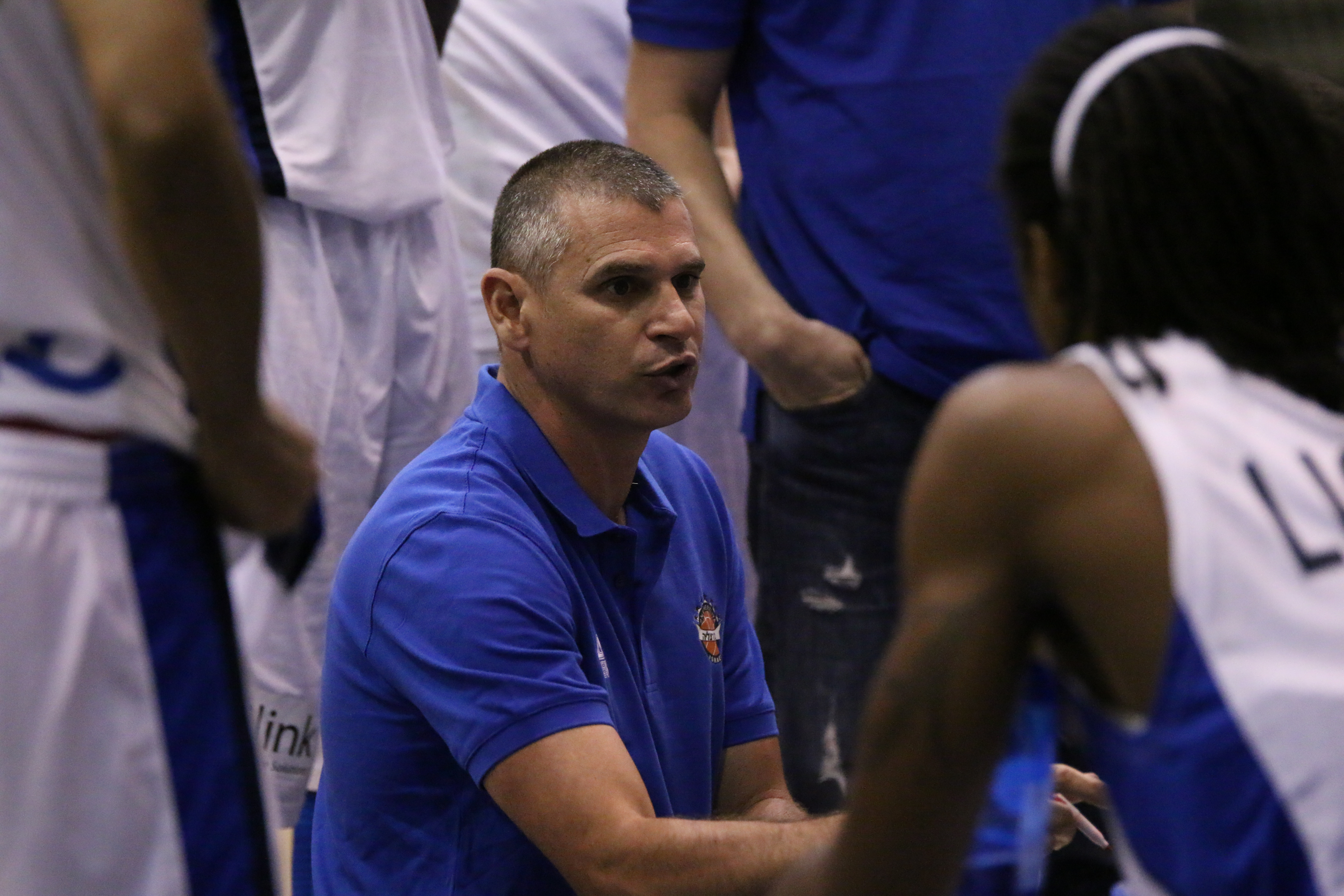
- Gorka with Bnei Herzliya in October 2016

Maccabi Haifa
- Title: Head coach
- League: Israeli National League

Personal information
- Born: 15 November 1972 (age 54) Haifa, Israel
- Listed height: 6 ft 2 in (1.88 m)

Career information
- College: West Florida (1995–1996); Wallace State CC (1996–1997); Spring Hill (1997–1999)
- NBA draft: 1999: undrafted
- Playing career: 1993–2005
- Position: Point guard
- Coaching career: 2006–present

Career history

Playing
- 1993–1995: Hapoel Haifa
- 1999–2001: Hapoel Haifa
- 2001–2004: Maccabi Kiryat Bialik
- 2004–2005: Maccabi Ramat Gan

Coaching
- 2006–2008: Ironi Nahariya (assistant)
- 2008–2010: Maccabi Haifa (assistant)
- 2010: Ironi Nahariya
- 2011: Maccabi Haifa (assistant)
- 2011–2012: Maccabi Haifa
- 2013–2014: Maccabi Kiryat Bialik
- 2014–2015: Bnei Herzliya (assistant)
- 2015–2017: Bnei Herzliya
- 2017–2018: Hapoel Jerusalem (assistant)
- 2018: Ironi Nahariya
- 2018–2019: Maccabi Rehovot
- 2019–2020: Bnei Herzliya
- 2022–2023: Hapoel Hevel Modi'in
- 2023: Hapoel Haifa
- 2023: Romania (men)
- 2023–2025: Maccabi Rishon LeZion
- 2025–present: Maccabi Haifa

Michael "Mickey" Gorka (Hebrew: מיקי גורקה; born November 15, 1972) is an Israeli professional basketball coach and former professional player. He is currently the head coach for Maccabi Haifa of the Israeli National League.

== Early life and playing career ==
Gorka was born in Haifa, Israel. He played college basketball for University of West Florida's Argonauts, Wallace State Community College and the Spring Hill College's Badgers, alongside Eric Campbell and Tony Younger.

Gorka started his professional career with Hapoel Haifa and later joined Maccabi Kiryat Bialik and Maccabi Ramat Gan.

== Coaching career ==
In 2006, Gorka started his coaching career as the assistant coach of Ironi Nahariya under Ariel Beit-Halahmy.

On March 2, 2011, Gorka was named Maccabi Haifa new head coach for the rest of the season, replacing Ami Nawi. Gorka led Haifa to finish the 2010–11 Season in the ninth place and secure their place in the Premier League for another season. On January 20, 2012, Gorka parted ways with Maccabi Haifa.

On August 18, 2014, Gorka was named the assistant coach of Bnei Herzliya under head coach Muli Katzurin. On February 10, 2015, Gorka was named Bnei Herzliya new head coach for the rest of the season. On April 2, 2015, Gorka was named Israeli League Coach of the Month for games played in March.

On December 1, 2016, Gorka was named Israeli League Coach of the Month for games played in November. In his third season with Herzliya, he led the team to the 2017 Israeli League Playoffs as the fifth seed, but they eventually were eliminated by Maccabi Tel Aviv in the Quarterfinals.

On December 5, 2017, Gorka parted ways with Herzliya after three years as the head coach. Six days later, Gorka was named the assistant coach of Hapoel Jerusalem for the rest of the season.

On July 1, 2018, Gorka returned to Ironi Nahariya for a third stint, signing a two-year deal. However, on December 11, 2018, he parted ways with Nahariya after five consecutive losses and a 2–7 start to the 2018–19 season.

On December 14, 2018, Gorka was named the head coach of Maccabi Rehovot for the rest of the season, replacing Roy Hagay.

On September 5, 2019, Gorka returned to Bnei Herzliya for a second stint, signing for the 2019–20 season.

In the summer of 2023, Gorka took charge of the Romania men's national basketball team replacing Dragan Petričević.
