= Nick Faust =

American basketball player (born 1993)

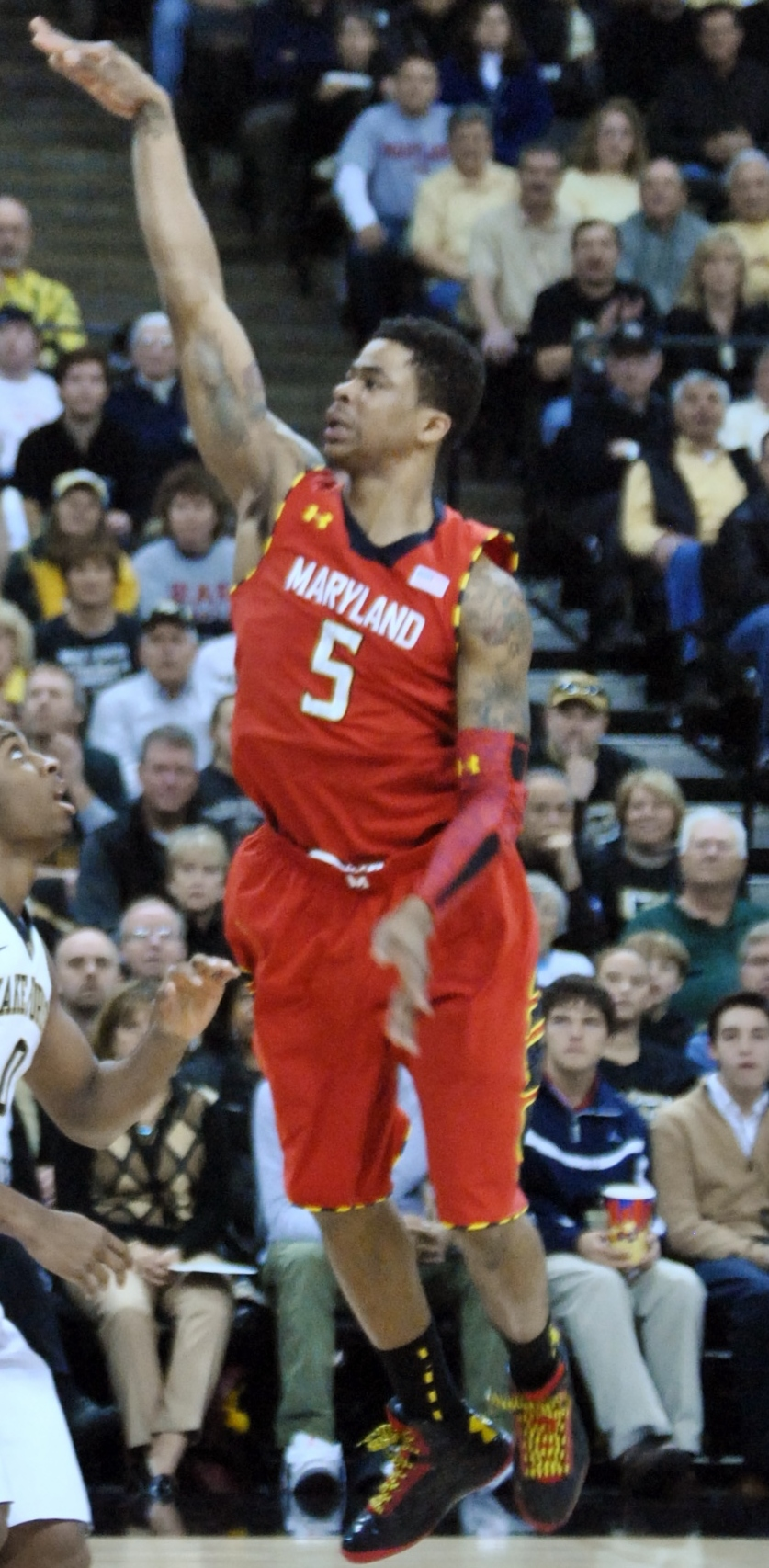
- Faust playing for Maryland in March 2013

Personal information
- Born: February 25, 1993 (age 33) Baltimore, Maryland, U.S.
- Listed height: 6 ft 6 in (1.98 m)
- Listed weight: 210 lb (95 kg)

Career information
- High school: Baltimore City College (Baltimore, Maryland)
- College: Maryland (2011–2014); Long Beach State (2015–2016)
- NBA draft: 2016: undrafted
- Playing career: 2016–present
- Position: Shooting guard / small forward

Career history
- 2016–2017: Ironi Nahariya
- 2018: Orlandina Basket
- 2018–2020: Atomerőmű SE
- 2020–2021: Spójnia Stargard
- 2021–2022: Hsinchu JKO Lioneers
- 2022: Al-Ahli Manama
- 2022–2023: Formosa Taishin Dreamers
- 2023: Tainan TSG GhostHawks
- 2023: Spartans Distrito Capital
- 2023: Leones de Santo Domingo
- 2023: Freseros de Irapuato
- 2024: Amartha Hangtuah
- 2024: Petro de Luanda
- 2025: Pioneros de Los Mochis
- 2025: Correbasket UAT

Career highlights
- BAL champion (2024); Israeli League All-Star (2017); First-team All-Big West (2016)

Nicholas David Jordan Faust (born February 25, 1993) is an American professional basketball player for Pioneros de Los Mochis for the Circuito de Baloncesto de la Costa del Pacífico (CIBACOPA). He played college basketball for Maryland Terrapins and the Long Beach State 49ers. Faust was the leading scorer on the Petro de Luanda team that won the BAL championship in 2024.

== College career ==
He played three seasons for the University of Maryland. In his first season he was named to the All-Freshman Team of the Atlantic Coast Conference. He averaged 9.4 points, 3.7 rebounds and 2 assists per game as a junior and spent the latter half of the season as a bench player. In 2014 he transferred to Long Beach State after originally committing to Oregon State, and sat out a redshirt year per NCAA regulations. Faust played one more season, in which he averaged 17.4 points and 6.1 rebounds per game and led the 49ers to the NIT. Faust was chosen as the newcomer of the year of the Big West Conference and was named to the First Team All Big West.

== Professional career ==
=== Ironi Nahariya (2016–2017) ===
On July 17, 2016, Faust signed with the Israeli team Ironi Nahariya for the 2016–17 season. On January 17, 2017, Faust recorded a career-high 30 points by playing only 22 minutes, shooting 10-of-16 from the field, along with six rebounds and three steals in a 101–62 blowout win over the Bakken Bears. On April 18, 2017, Faust participated in the Israeli League All-Star Game and the Slam Dunk Contest during the same event. In 57 games played for Nahariya, he averaged 10.9 points, 4.4 rebounds and 2.2 assists per game. Faust helped Nahariya reach the 2017 FIBA Europe Cup Quarterfinals as well as the 2017 Israeli League Quarterfinals, where they eventually fell short to Hapoel Jerusalem.

=== Orlandina (2018) ===
On July 13, 2017, Faust agreed to terms with the Russian team Parma Basket but eventually the deal fell through. On February 1, 2018, Faust joined the Italian team Orlandina Basket for the rest of the season. In 13 games played for Orlandina, he averaged 11 points, 4.4 rebounds and 2.1 assists per game.

=== Atomerőmű SE (2018–2020) ===
On September 1, 2018, Faust signed with the Hungarian team Atomerőmű SE for the 2018–19 season. On December 27, 2018, Faust recorded a double-double with a season-high 28 points and 11 rebounds, shooting 8-of-13 from the field, along with three assists in an 84–93 loss to Egis Körmend. In 35 games played during the 2018–19 season, he led the team in scoring (16.1) and steals (1.7), to go with 6.3 rebounds and 2.1 assists per game.

On September 24, 2019, Faust signed a one-year contract extension with Atomerőmű.

=== Spójnia Stargard (2020–2021) ===
On November 23, 2020, he has signed with Spójnia Stargard of the PLK.

=== Hsinchu JKO Lioneers (2021–2022) ===
In 2021, Faust joined the Hsinchu JKO Lioneers of the P. League+ in Taiwan.

=== Formosa Taishin Dreamers (2022–2023) ===
In 2022, Faust joined the Formosa Taishin Dreamers of the P. League+ in Taiwan.

=== Tainan TSG GhostHawks (2023) ===
On January 12, 2023, Faust signed with Tainan TSG GhostHawks of the T1 League. On March 6, Tainan TSG GhostHawks terminated the contract relationship with Faust.

=== Amartha Hangtuah (2024) ===
In December 2023, Faust joined the Amartha Hangtuah of the Indonesian Basketball League for the 2024 season.

=== Petro de Luanda (2024) ===
In May 2024, Faust joined the Angolan team Petro de Luanda for the 2024 BAL playoffs. Faust was the team's leading scorer with 18 points per game, shooting 41.2% from three-point range. He scored a team-high 24 points in the final against Al Ahly Ly, guiding Petro to their first BAL championship.

Faust extended his contract on August 10, 2024.

== BAL career statistics ==
Legend
GP	Games played	GS	Games started	MPG	Minutes per game
FG%	Field goal percentage	3P%	3-point field goal percentage	FT%	Free throw percentage
RPG	Rebounds per game	APG	Assists per game	SPG	Steals per game
BPG	Blocks per game	PPG	Points per game	**Bold**	Career high
†	Won an BAL championship

Year	Team	GP	GS	MPG	FG%	3P%	FT%	RPG	APG	SPG	BPG	PPG
2024†	Petro de Luanda	4	0	21.7	.500	.417	.583	2.5	2.3	1.5	0.3	18.0
