= Egor Koulechov =

Israeli-Russian basketball player

Egor Koulechov איגור קולשוב
No. 15 – Ironi Ness Ziona
- Position: Shooting guard / small forward
- League: Israeli Basketball Premier League

Personal information
- Born: November 5, 1994 (age 32) Volgograd, Russia
- Listed height: 1.96 m (6 ft 5 in)
- Listed weight: 93 kg (205 lb)

Career information
- High school: Sagemont (Weston, Florida)
- College: Arizona State (2013–2014); Rice (2015–2017); Florida (2017–2018)
- NBA draft: 2018: undrafted
- Playing career: 2018–present

Career history
- 2018–2019: Maccabi Rishon LeZion
- 2019: →Hapoel Holon
- 2019–2020: Ironi Nahariya
- 2020–2021: UNICS Kazan
- 2021–2022: Maccabi Rishon LeZion
- 2022: Hapoel Tel Aviv
- 2022–2024: Hapoel Be'er Sheva
- 2024: Avtodor Saratov
- 2024–2025: Hapoel Jerusalem
- 2025–2026: Keflavík
- 2026: Hapoel Tel Aviv
- 2026–present: Ironi Ness Ziona

Career highlights
- Israeli League Cup winner (2018); First-team All-Conference USA (2017)

Egor Koulechov (Hebrew: איגור קולשוב, Russian: Егор Кулешов; born November 5, 1994) is an Israeli-Russian professional basketball player for Ironi Ness Ziona of the Israeli Basketball Premier League. He played college basketball for Arizona State, Rice, and Florida before playing professionally in Israel. Standing at 1.96 m (6' 5"), Koulechov plays as a shooting guard or a small forward.

== Early life ==
Koulechov was born in Volgograd, Russia, and is Jewish. Koulechov lived his first 6 years in Russia before growing up in Kibbutz Neve Ur, Israel. He played for Maccabi Rishon LeZion youth team and Wingate Institute Academy.

In 2011, Koulechov moved to the United States, where he enrolled at Sagemont in Weston, Florida, and played for the basketball team in the 2011–12 and 2012–13 seasons.

== College career ==
Koulechov began his college career at Arizona State, where he averaged 3.7 points and 2.8 rebounds while shooting 43.8 percent from the field. On June 4, 2014, Koulechov left for Rice after his freshman season but sat out first season per NCAA Transfer rules.

In the 2016–17 season, Koulechov earned first-team All-Conference USA and Second Team NABC All-District 11 honors as a junior at Rice. He was also named two-time Conference USA Player of the Week. Koulechov ranked second on the team and fifth in Conference USA with 18.2 points.

Koulechov graduated from Rice in 2017 with one season of NCAA eligibility remaining; under NCAA rules, he had the option of remaining at Rice or enrolling in a graduate program elsewhere and finishing out his college basketball career at the new school. Accordingly, he announced on April 19, 2017, that he would play at Florida as a graduate transfer.

In his senior year at Florida, Koulechov led the team with 6.4 rebounds per game and ranked second with 13.8 points per game. He had six games with 20+ points and nine games with at least three 3-pointers made.

== Professional career ==
=== 2018–19 season ===
After going undrafted in the 2018 NBA draft, Koulechov joined the Minnesota Timberwolves for the 2018 NBA Summer League.

On August 9, 2018, Koulechov started his professional career with Maccabi Rishon LeZion, signing a two-year deal. In October 2018, Koulechov won the 2018 Israeli League Cup with Rishon LeZion. In 26 Israeli League games played for Rishon LeZion, he averaged 11.5 points, 5.3 rebounds and 1.5 assists per game.

On April 17, 2019, Koulechov was loaned to Hapoel Holon for the rest of the season, joining as an injury cover for Guy Pnini.

=== 2019–20 season ===
On August 15, 2019, Koulechov signed with Ironi Nahariya for the 2019–20 season.

=== 2020–21 season ===
On November 25, 2020, he has signed with UNICS Kazan of the VTB United League.

=== 2021–22 season ===
On July 7, 2021, Koulechov re-joined Maccabi Rishon LeZion. On January 22, 2022, Koulechov signed with Hapoel Tel Aviv.

=== 2022–23 season ===
On July 18, 2022, he signed with Hapoel Be'er Sheva of the Israeli Basketball Premier League.

== National team career ==
Koulechov was a member of the Israeli U-16, U-18 and U-20 national teams.

In July 2013, he averaged 12.0 points and 4.6 rebounds for the U-20 squad, leading his team with a 93.5 free throw percentage as well as 1.7 steals per game. The team claimed 15th place in the 2013 FIBA Europe Under-20 Championship.

== Career statistics ==
Legend
GP	Games played	MPG	Minutes per game	FG%	Field goal percentage
3P%	3-point field goal percentage	FT%	Free throw percentage	RPG	Rebounds per game
APG	Assists per game	SPG	Steals per game	BPG	Blocks per game
PPG	Points per game	**Bold**	Career high		Led the league

=== College ===
Year	Team	GP	GS	MPG	FG%	3P%	FT%	RPG	APG	SPG	BPG	PPG
2013–14	Arizona State	27	7	14.0	.438	.333	.679	2.8	0.5	0.3	0.2	3.7
2015–16	Rice	32	32	**34.4**	.417	.343	.862	7.0	1.3	**0.8**	0.1	16.7
2016–17	Rice	**35**	**35**	34.0	**.474**	**.474**	.819	**8.8**	**2.1**	**0.8**	**0.3**	**18.2**
2017–18	Florida	34	34	30.6	.414	.398	**.864**	6.4	1.1	0.5	0.1	13.7
Career		128	108	29.0	.436	.395	.832	6.4	1.3	0.6	0.2	13.6

Source: RealGM
