= Karam Mashour =

Israeli basketball player (born 1991)

Karam Mashour كرم مشعور כארם משעור
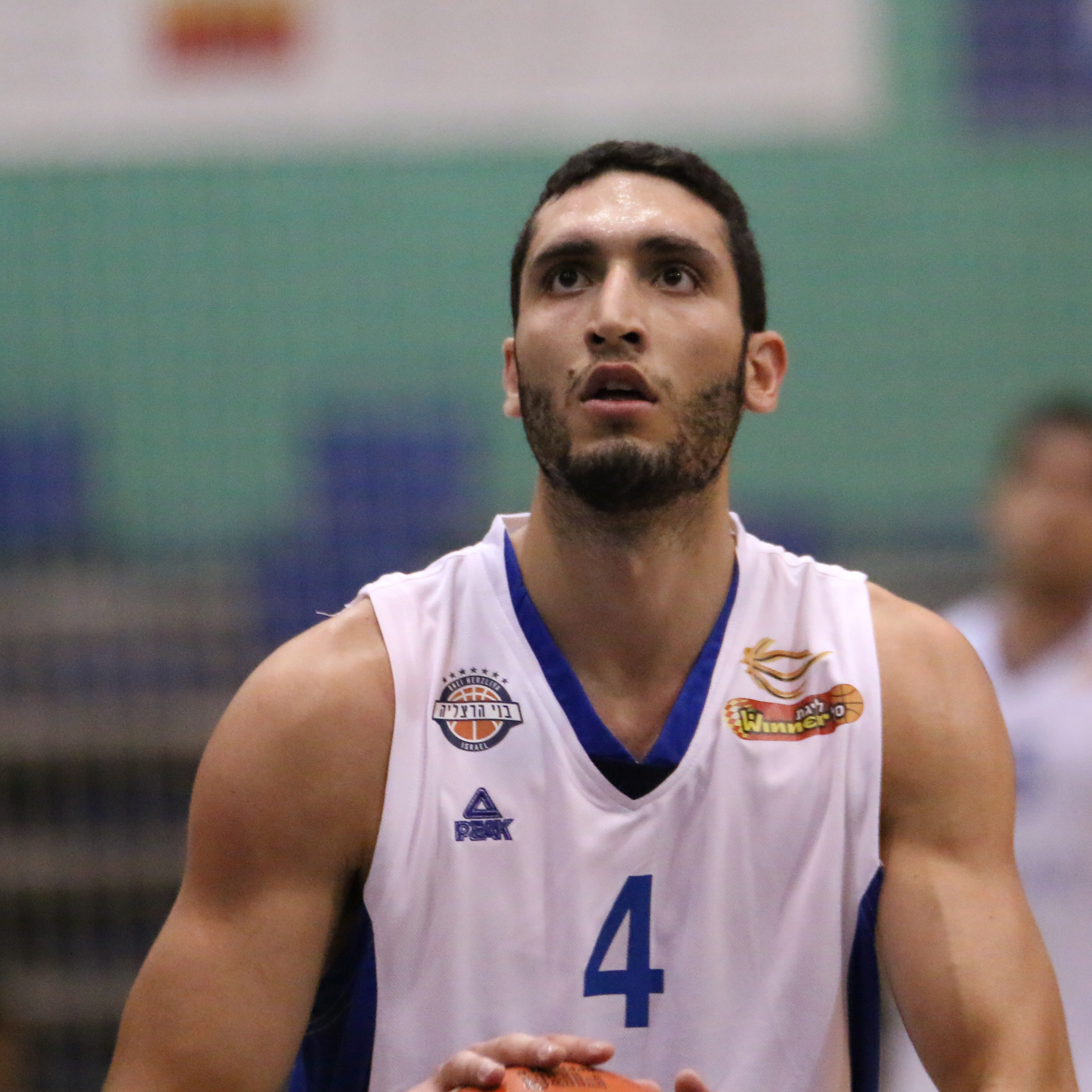
- Mashour with Bnei Herzliya in 2016

No. 4 – Maccabi Ramat Gan
- Position: Small forward / power forward
- League: Israeli Basketball Premier League

Personal information
- Born: 9 August 1991 (age 35) Nazareth, Israel
- Listed height: 6 ft 6 in (1.98 m)
- Listed weight: 210 lb (95 kg)

Career information
- High school: St. Joseph (Nazareth, Israel)
- College: UNLV (2010–2012); Morehead State (2013–2015)
- NBA draft: 2015: undrafted
- Playing career: 2015–present

Career history
- 2015–2017: Bnei Herzliya
- 2017–2018: Maccabi Tel Aviv
- 2018–2019: Bnei Herzliya
- 2019–2020: Gries Oberhoffen
- 2020: Hapoel Tel Aviv
- 2020–2021: Hapoel Haifa
- 2021–2022: Hapoel Galil Elyon
- 2022–2023: Ironi Kiryat Ata
- 2023–present: Maccabi Ramat Gan

Career highlights
- BIBL champion (2022); Israeli League champion (2018); Israeli League Cup winner (2017); Israeli League Rising Star (2016); Israeli League Rebounding Leader (2017); All-Israeli League First Team (2017); 3× Israeli League All-Star (2016–2017, 2019)

Karam Mashour (Arabic: كرم مشعور, Hebrew: כארם משעור; born 9 August 1991) is an Israeli professional basketball player for Maccabi Ramat Gan of the Israeli Basketball Premier League. He played college basketball for the University of Nevada, Las Vegas (UNLV) and Morehead State University, before playing professionally in Israel and France. In 2016–17, he was the top rebounder in the Israel Basketball Premier League.

== Early life ==
Mashour was born in Nazareth, Israel, to an Arab-Christian family. He attended St. Joseph High School in Nazareth. Mashour played for Maccabi Y.M.C.A Nazareth youth team. He was later joined Emek Yizra'el (Jezreel Valley) youth academy in his late teens. Mashour helped Emek Yizra'el reach the Youth State Cup Finals in 2009, while averaging 21.6 points and 6.0 rebounds per game.

== College career ==
Between 2010 and 2012, Mashour played college basketball for UNLV, but managed to play just 25 games over two seasons. He subsequently transferred to Morehead State and sat out the 2012–13 season due to NCAA transfer regulations. He joined the Eagles for the 2013–14 season but was limited to only two games due to a back injury. Mashour finally played a full season in 2014–15, appearing in 34 games for the Eagles while receiving 27 starting assignments. In what was his final collegiate season, he averaged 10.9 points and 5.9 rebounds per game.

== Professional career ==
=== Bnei Herzliya (2015–2017) ===
On July 29, 2015, Mashour started his professional career with Bnei Herzliya, signing a one-year deal with an option for another one. On December 26, 2015, Mashour recorded a career-high 25 points, shooting 11-of-17 from the field, along with seven rebounds and three steals in a 74–102 blowout loss to Maccabi Tel Aviv. In his first season with Herzliya, Mashour averaged 8 points, 3.9 rebounds and 1.1 steals per game. On June 3, 2016, Mashour was named the 2016 Israeli League Rising Star.

On October 26, 2016, Mashour recorded 22 points, shooting 8-of-14 from the field, along with nine rebounds and six steals in an 89–64 win over Prievidza. He was subsequently earned a spot in the FIBA Europe Cup Top Performers of Week 2. On November 12, 2016, Mashour recorded a double-double of 16 points and 17 rebounds, along with four assists, leading Herzliya to an 84–82 win over Maccabi Tel Aviv. He was subsequently named Israeli League Round 6 MVP.

Mashour helped Herzliya reach the 2017 Israeli League Playoffs as the fifth seed, but they eventually were eliminated by Maccabi Tel Aviv in the Quarterfinals. Mashour finished that season as the league's best rebounder with 10 per game, to go with 14.1 points and 1.4 steals per game. On June 9, 2017, Mashour earned a spot in the All-Israeli League First Team.

=== Maccabi Tel Aviv (2017–2018) ===
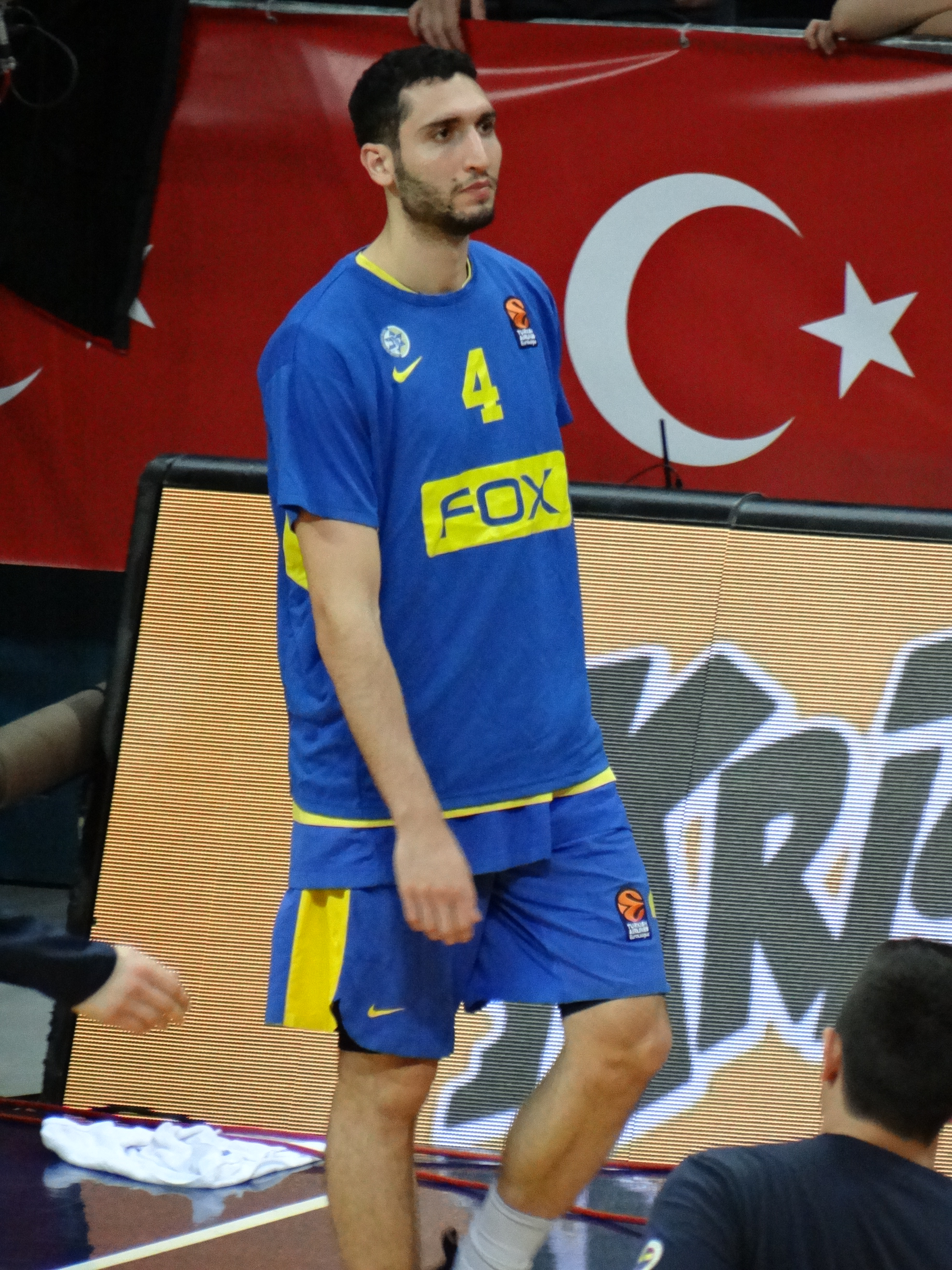
Mashour with Maccabi Tel Aviv in March 2018

On July 9, 2017, Mashour signed a two-year deal with Maccabi Tel Aviv. On January 13, 2018, Mashour recorded a season-high 17 points, shooting 5-of-8 from the field, along with seven rebounds in a 90–86 win over his former team Bnei Herzliya.

Mashour went on to win the 2017 Israeli League Cup and the 2018 Israeli League Championship titles with Maccabi.

=== Return to Bnei Herzliya (2018–2019) ===
On August 14, 2018, Mashour returned to Bnei Herzliya for a second stint, signing a one-year deal. On December 8, 2018, Mashour recorded 22 points, shooting 9-of-17 from the field, along with eight rebounds and four steals, leading Herzliya to a 105–78 win over Hapoel Gilboa Galil. He averaged 12.2 points, 4.9 rebounds, and 1.4 steals per game. That season, Bnei Herzliya finished the regular season in the last place out of 12 teams and was relegated to the Israeli National League (the second-tier league in Israel).

=== Gries Oberhoffen (2019–2020) ===
On November 14, 2019, Mashour signed with Gries Oberhoffen of the French LNB Pro B. He appeared in 11 games for Gries, averaging 14.4 points, 5.3 rebounds and 1.4 assists per game, while shooting 44.2 percent from three-point range. On February 12, 2020, he parted ways with Gries.

=== Hapoel Tel Aviv (2020) ===
On February 1, 2020, he signed with Hapoel Tel Aviv of the Israeli Basketball Premier League.

=== Hapoel Haifa (2020–2021) ===
During the summer of 2020, Mashour signed with Hapoel Haifa of the Israeli Basketball Premier League. He averaged 10.1 points and 3.8 rebounds per game.

=== Hapoel Galil Elyon (2021–2022) ===
On December 19, 2021, he signed with Hapoel Galil Elyon of the Israeli Basketball Premier League. He averaged 4.2 points and 2.2 rebounds per game.

=== Ironi Kiryat Ata (2022–present) ===
In the summer of 2022, Mashour signed with Ironi Kiryat Ata in the Israeli Basketball Premier League.

== Israel national team ==
Mashour was a member of the U-18 Israeli national basketball team.
