= Darion Atkins =

American basketball player (born 1992)

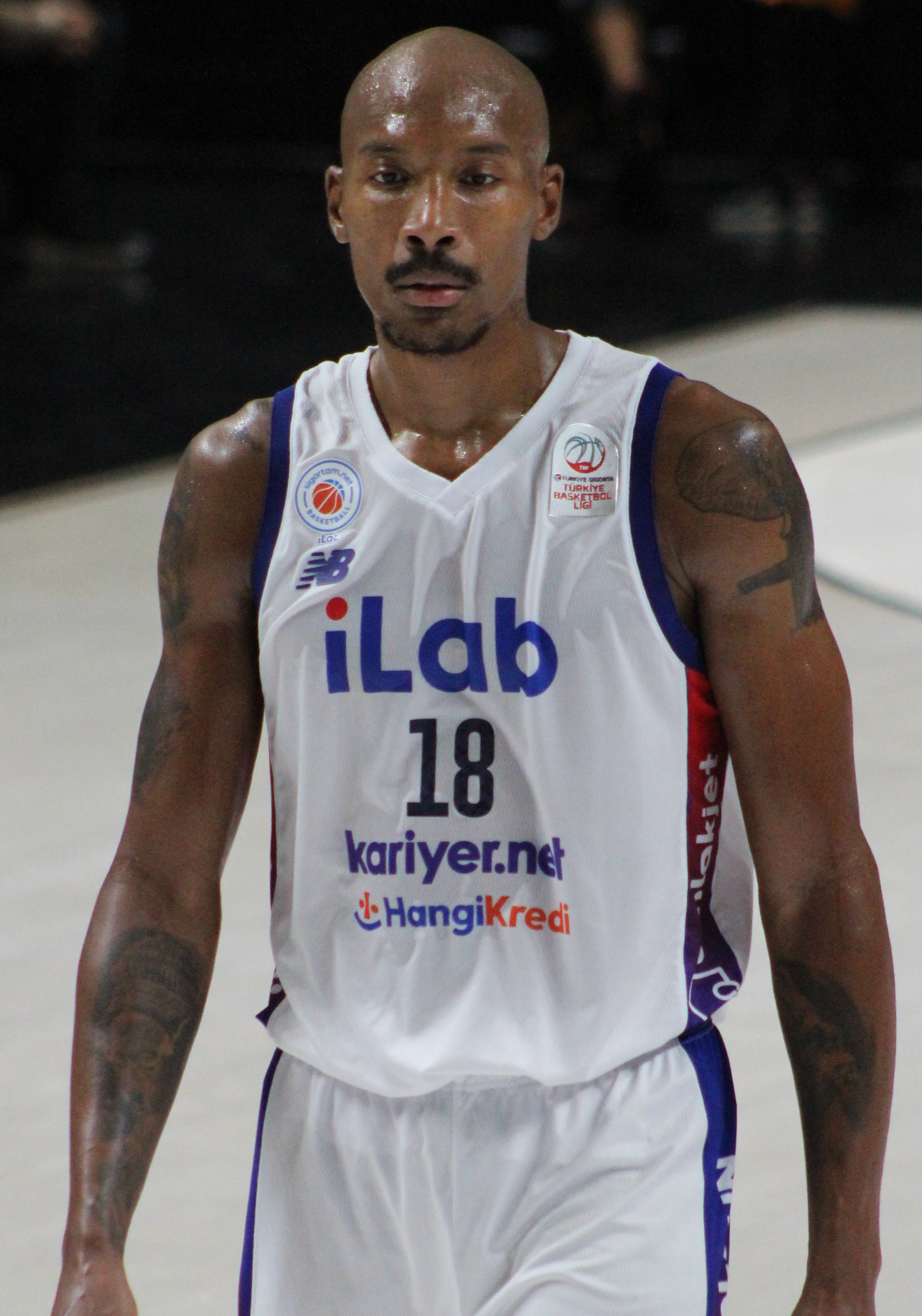
- Atkins with iLab Basketbol in October 2024

No. 17 – Niners Chemnitz
- Position: Power forward / center
- League: Basketball Bundesliga; EuroCup

Personal information
- Born: September 17, 1992 (age 34) Clinton, Maryland
- Listed height: 6 ft 8 in (2.03 m)
- Listed weight: 230 lb (104 kg)

Career information
- High school: Landon School (Bethesda, Maryland)
- College: Virginia (2011–2015)
- NBA draft: 2015: undrafted
- Playing career: 2015–present

Career history
- 2015–2016: Westchester Knicks
- 2016–2017: Hapoel Holon
- 2017–2018: SIG Strasbourg
- 2018–2019: Hapoel Holon
- 2019: Canarias
- 2019–2020: Brose Bamberg
- 2020: AEK Athens
- 2020–2021: Lokman Hekim Fethiye Belediyespor
- 2021–2022: Niners Chemnitz
- 2022–2023: Dolomiti Energia Trento
- 2023–2025: UnaHotels Reggio Emilia
- 2025–2026: Maccabi Ironi Ramat Gan
- 2026–present: Niners Chemnitz

Career highlights
- French Cup winner (2018); All-Israeli League Second Team (2017); Israeli League All-Star (2017); ACC Defensive Player of the Year (2015); ACC All-Defensive Team (2015); Lefty Driesell Award (2015)
- Stats at Basketball Reference

Darion Ray Atkins (born September 17, 1992) is an American professional basketball player for Niners Chemnitz of the Basketball Bundesliga (BBL) and the EuroCup. He played college basketball for the University of Virginia before playing professionally in Israel, France and Germany. Standing at 6 ft 8 in (2.03 m), he plays the power forward and center positions.

== Early life and college career ==
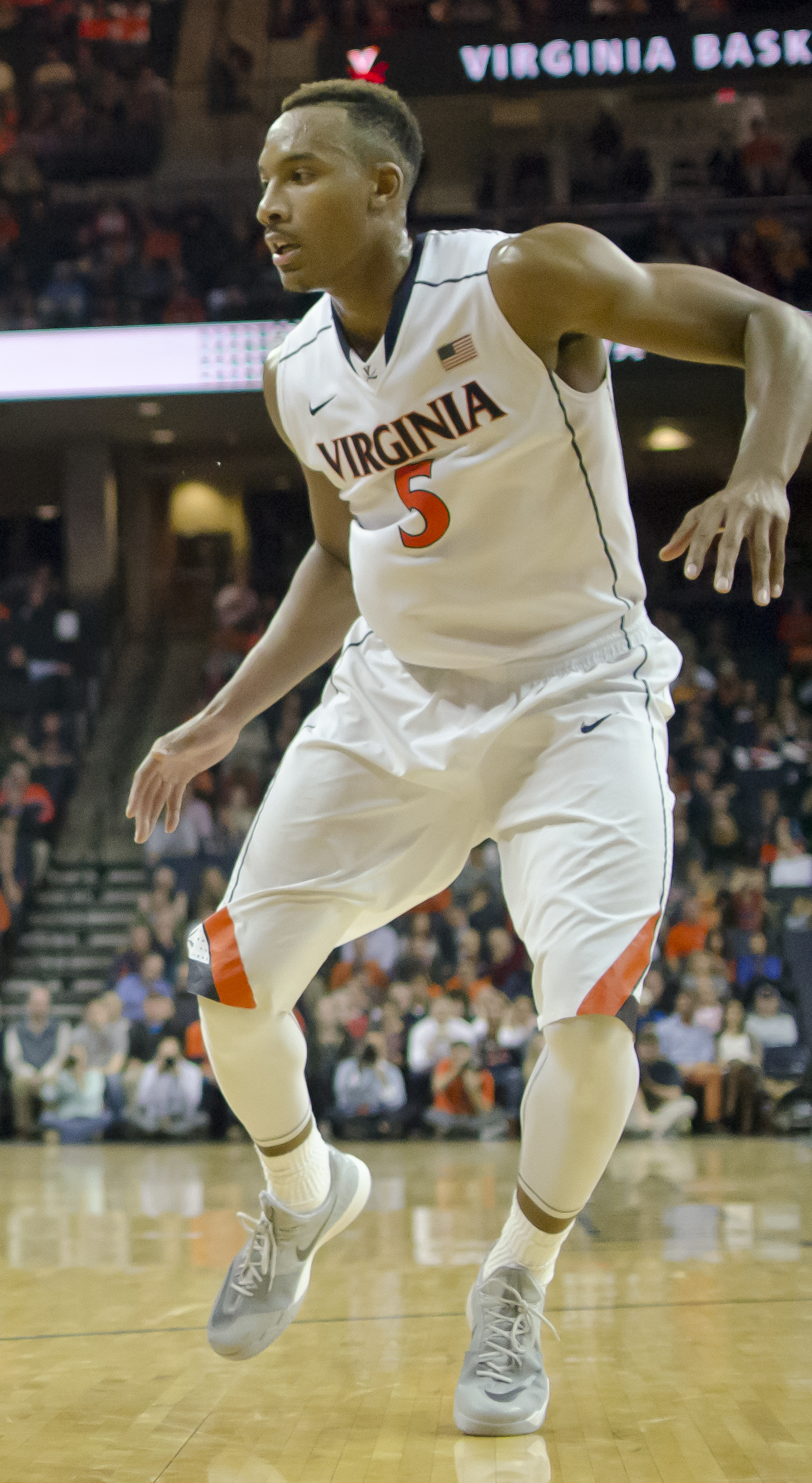
Atkins with the Virginia Cavaliers in November 2014

Atkins attended the Landon School in Bethesda, Maryland, where he averaged 15.2 points, 12 rebounds and 7.3 blocks per game as a senior, earning All-Interstate Athletic Conference honors.

Atkins had offers from Notre Dame and Maryland, but he chose to attend the University of Virginia, where he averaged 7.6 points, 5.9 rebounds and 1.1 blocks in 23.9 minutes per game in his senior year.

On March 8, 2015, Atkins was named ACC Defensive Player of the Year. On April 3, 2015, Atkins was named Lefty Driesell Defensive Player of the Year Award.

== Professional career ==
=== Westchester Knicks (2015–2016) ===
After going undrafted in the 2015 NBA draft, Atkins joined the San Antonio Spurs for the 2015 NBA Summer League. On September 10, 2015, Atkins signed with the New York Knicks. However, he was later waived by the New York on October 23 after appearing in three preseason games. On November 2, he was acquired by the Westchester Knicks of the NBA Development League as an affiliate player of New York.

=== Hapoel Holon (2016–2017) ===
On July 1, 2016, Atkins joined the Golden State Warriors for the 2016 NBA Summer League.

On August 5, 2016, Atkins signed a one-year deal with the Israeli team Hapoel Holon. On October 22, 2016, Atkins recorded a career-high 26 points, shooting 11-of-16 from the field, along with 13 rebounds in a 72–81 loss to Maccabi Tel Aviv. On November 3, 2016, Atkins was named Israeli League Player of the Month for games played in October. On April 18, 2017, Atkins participated in the 2017 Israeli League All-Star Game.

Atkins helped Holon reach the 2017 Israeli League Playoffs as the first seed, but they eventually were eliminated by Maccabi Haifa in the Quarterfinals. On June 9, 2017, Atkins earned a spot in the 2017 All-Israeli League Second Team.

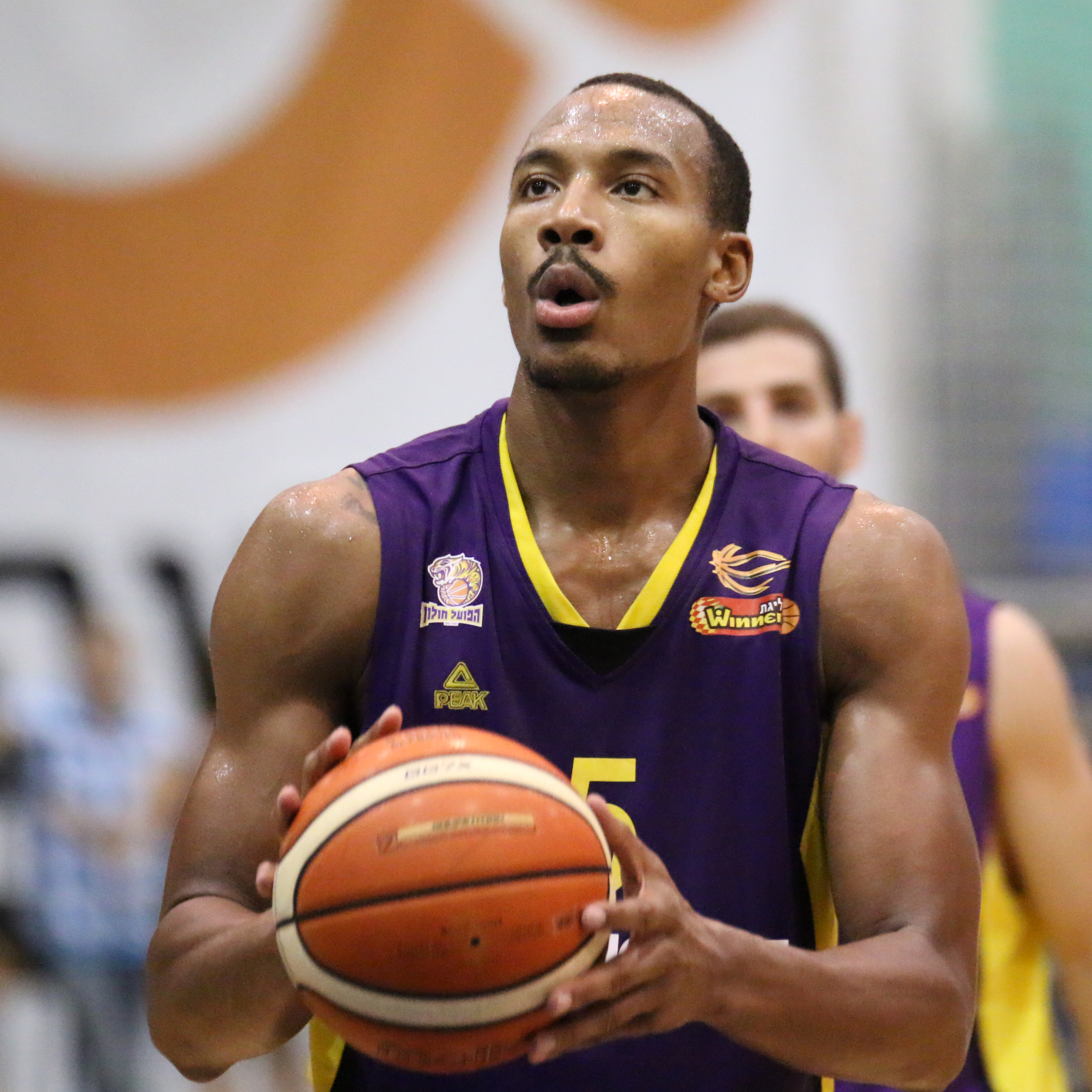
Atkins with Hapoel Holon in October 2016

=== SIG Strasbourg (2017–2018) ===
On July 3, 2017, Atkins joined the Phoenix Suns for the 2017 NBA Summer League.

On July 21, 2017, Atkins signed with the French team SIG Strasbourg for the 2017–18 season. On December 5, 2017, Atkins recorded a season-high 23 points, shooting 10-of-12 from the field, along with four rebounds in an 87–72 win over Banvit. He was subsequently made the Champions League Team of the Week. Atkins went on to win the 2018 French Cup with Strasbourg.

=== Return to Hapoel Holon (2018–2019) ===
On July 28, 2018, Atkins returned to Hapoel Holon for a second stint, signing a one-year deal with an option for another one. On March 16, 2019, Atkins recorded a double-double of 25 points and 12 rebounds, shooting 10-of-13 from the field, along with two assists in a 101–82 win over Hapoel Jerusalem. He was subsequently named Israeli League Round 22 MVP. Atkins helped Holon reach the 2019 FIBA Europe Cup Semifinals, where they eventually were eliminated by Dinamo Sassari.

=== Iberostar Tenerife (2019) ===
On July 19, 2019, Atkins signed with Spanish club Iberostar Tenerife. On December 18, 2019, he parted ways with Tenerife after appearing in 17 games.

=== Brose Bamberg (2019–2020) ===
On December 19, 2019, Atkins signed with Brose Bamberg of the German Basketball Bundesliga for the rest of the season. He averaged 8.0 points, 3.6 rebounds and 1.4 blocks per game.

=== AEK (2020) ===
On September 22, 2020, Atkins signed with AEK Athens of the Greek Basket League and the Basketball Champions League.

=== Fethiye Belediyespor (2020–2021) ===
On October 15, 2020, he has signed with Lokman Hekim Fethiye Belediyespor of the Turkish BSL.

=== Niners Chemnitz (2021–2022) ===
On July 24, 2021, he has signed with Niners Chemnitz of the Basketball Bundesliga.

=== Aquila Basket Trento (2022–2023) ===
On July 26, 2022, he has signed with Dolomiti Energia Trento of the Italian Lega Basket Serie A (LBA).

=== Maccabi Ironi Ramat Gan (2025–2026) ===
On September 9, 2025, he has signed with Maccabi Ironi Ramat Gan of the Israeli League Israeli Basketball Premier League (Ligat HaAl).

=== Return to Niners Chemnitz (2026–present) ===
On June 15, 2026, he signed with Niners Chemnitz of the Basketball Bundesliga (BBL) for a second stint.

== Personal life ==
The son of Minnette Atkins, he has a twin brother, Darius (a professional dancer in New York City) and majored in sociology. Atkins claims soccer as his favorite sport other than basketball, and cites FC Barcelona as his favorite soccer team.

== Career statistics ==
Legend
GP	Games played	MPG	Minutes per game	FG%	Field goal percentage
3P%	3-point field goal percentage	FT%	Free throw percentage	RPG	Rebounds per game
APG	Assists per game	SPG	Steals per game	BPG	Blocks per game
PPG	Points per game	**Bold**	Career high		Led the league

=== College ===
Year	Team	GP	GS	MPG	FG%	3P%	FT%	RPG	APG	SPG	BPG	PPG
2011–12	Virginia	27	0	10.2	**.581**	.000	.579	2.3	.1	.4	.7	2.3
2012–13	Virginia	26	12	15.7	.491	.000	.600	3.1	.3	.4	**1.1**	4.7
2013–14	Virginia	**37**	3	10.4	.484	.000	**.583**	2.2	.3	.2	.5	3.0
2014–15	Virginia	33	**27**	**23.9**	.511	.000	.520	**6.0**	**.7**	**.8**	**1.1**	**7.6**
Career		123	42	15.1	.508	.000	.562	3.4	.4	.5	.8	4.4

=== Domestic Leagues ===
Year	Team	League	GP	MPG	FG%	3P%	FT%	RPG	APG	SPG	BPG	PPG
2015–16	(United States) Westchester Knicks	NBDL	**50**	**29.4**	.462	.167	.562	7.3	**1.7**	**.9**	**1.3**	8.7
2016–17	(Israel) Hapoel Holon	IPL	37	27.2	.590	.375	.616	**8.2**	.6	.7	.7	**13.6**
2017–18	(France) SIG Strasbourg	Pro A	41	21.2	.497	.260	.697	4.7	1.2	.6	.6	8.8
2018–19	(Israel) Hapoel Holon	IPL	37	24.3	**.596**	**.394**	**.737**	7.2	1.0	.7	1.0	12.4
2019	(Spain) Canarias	ACB	10	13.5	.209	.125	.500	2.5	.5	.0	.1	2.4

Source: RealGM
