= 2016–17 Israeli Basketball Super League =

2016–2017 Ligat Winner^{1}
- Season: 2016–17
- Duration: 8 October 2016 – 15 May 2017 (Regular season)
- Games played: 218
- Teams: 12
- TV partner(s): Sports Channel

Regular season
- Top seed: Hapoel Holon
- Season MVP: (Israel) John DiBartolomeo
- Promoted: Ironi Nes Ziona
- Relegated: Maccabi Kiryat Gat

Finals
- Champions: Hapoel Jerusalem (2nd title)
- Runners-up: Maccabi Haifa
- Final Four MVP: (United States) Jerome Dyson

Awards
- Most Improved Player(s): (Israel) Idan Zalmanson & Rafi Menco
- Sixth Man: (United States) Jason Siggers
- Defensive Player: (Venezuela) Gregory Vargas

Statistical leaders
Points	(United States) Mark Lyons	20.1
Rebounds	(Israel) Karam Mashour	10.3
Assists	(Venezuela) Gregory Vargas	6.6
Index Rating	(United States) Murphy Holloway	20.3

Records
- Biggest home win: Jerusalem 89–50 Kiryat Gat
- Biggest away win: Ironi Naharia 80–105 Hapoel Tel Aviv
- Winning streak: 9 Hapoel Eilat
- Losing streak: 10; Maccabi Kiryat Gat
- All statistics correct as of 17 May 2017.^{1} Sponsored league name, referring to Winner.

The 2016–2017 Israeli Basketball Super League, for sponsorship reasons Ligat Winner, was the 63rd season of the Israeli Basketball Super League. Maccabi Rishon LeZion was the defending champion. The regular season started on October 8, 2016, and ended on May 15, 2017.

== Teams ==
Teams 2016–17

Hapoel Gilboa Galil has been promoted to the league after winning 2015–16 National League. Ironi Nes Ziona who finished in last place during the 2015–2016 season, relegated from the Super League.

=== Stadia and locations ===
Team	Home city	Stadium	Capacity
Bnei Herzliya	Herzliya	HaYovel Herzliya	1,500
Maccabi Kiryat Gat	Kiryat Gat	Ashkelon Sports Arena	3,000
Hapoel Gilboa Galil	Gilboa Regional Council	Gan Ner Sports Hall	2,100
Hapoel Holon	Holon	Holon Toto Hall	5,500
Hapoel Jerusalem	Jerusalem	Pais Arena	11,000
Ironi Nahariya	Nahariya	Ein Sarah	2,500
Maccabi Ashdod	Ashdod	HaKiriya Arena	2,200
Hapoel Eilat	Eilat	Begin Arena	1,490
Maccabi Haifa	Haifa	Romema Arena	5,000
Maccabi Rishon LeZion	Rishon LeZion	Beit Maccabi Rishon	2,500
Maccabi Tel Aviv	Tel Aviv	Menora Mivtachim Arena	10,383
Hapoel Tel Aviv	Tel Aviv	Drive in Arena	3,504

=== Personnel and sponsorship ===
Team	Chairman	Head coach	Kit manufacturer	Shirt sponsor
Bnei Herzliya	(Israel) Eldad Akunis	(Israel) Mickey Gorka	Peak	Dell EMC
Maccabi Kiryat Gat	(Israel) Tomer Yamin	(Israel) Elad Hasin	Kappa	
Hapoel Gilboa Galil	(Israel) Haim Ohayon	(Israel) Ariel Beit-Halahmy	Peak	
Hapoel Holon	(Israel) Eitan Lanciano	(Israel) Dan Shamir	Peak	UNET
Hapoel Jerusalem	(Israel) Ori Allon	(Italy) Simone Pianigiani	adidas	Bank Yahav
Ironi Nahariya	(Israel) Nissim Alfasi	(Israel) Eric Alfasi	Peak	–
Maccabi Ashdod	(Israel) Meir Kikos	(Israel) Meir Tapiro	And1	Kaplan Medical Center
Hapoel Eilat	(Israel) Motti Amsalem	(Israel) Oded Kattash	And1	Fattal
Maccabi Haifa	(United States) Jeff Rosen	(Israel) Offer Rahimi	Peak	Hunter
Maccabi Rishon LeZion	(Israel) Itzhak Peri	(Israel) Shmulik Brenner	Under Armour	Rand Media
Maccabi Tel Aviv	(Israel) Shimon Mizrahi	(Israel) Arik Shivek	Nike	FOX
Hapoel Tel Aviv	(Israel) Rami Cohen	(Israel) Rami Hadar	Peak	SP

=== Managerial changes ===
Team	Outgoing manager	Manner of departure	Date of vacancy	Position in table	Incoming manager	Date of appointment
Maccabi Ashdod	(Israel) Zvika Sherf	End of contract	21 June 2016	Pre-season	(Israel) Meir Tapiro	21 June 2016
Hapoel Jerusalem	(Israel) Danny Franco	End of contract	20 June 2016	Pre-season	(Italy) Simone Pianigiani	20 June 2016
Maccabi Tel Aviv	(Croatia) Žan Tabak	Sacked	8 June 2016	Pre-season	(Israel) Erez Edelstein	9 June 2016
Maccabi Haifa	(Israel) Rami Hadar	End of contract	7 June 2016	Pre-season	(Israel) Ofer Rahimi	7 June 2016
Maccabi Tel Aviv	(Israel) Erez Edelstein	Sacked	22 October 2016		(Israel) Rami Hadar	23 October 2016
Maccabi Kiryat Gat	(Israel) Nati Cohen	Resigned	7 December 2016		(Israel) Elad Hasin	10 December 2016
Maccabi Tel Aviv	(Israel) Rami Hadar	Resigned	16 December 2016		(Latvia) Ainars Bagatskis	24 December 2016
Hapoel Tel Aviv	(Israel) Sharon Avrahami	Sacked	1 January 2017		(Israel) Rami Hadar	3 January 2017
Maccabi Tel Aviv	(Latvia) Ainars Bagatskis	Sacked	16 May 2017	4th (19–14)	(Israel) Arik Shivek	16 May 2017

== Regular season ==
The regular season started on October 8, 2016, and ended on May 15, 2017.

=== Standings ===
Pos	Team	Pld	W	L	PF	PA	PD	Qualification or relegation
1	Hapoel Holon	33	22	11	2709	2522	+187	Advance to Play-offs
2	Hapoel Eilat	33	21	12	2727	2625	+102	Advance to Play-offs
3	Hapoel Jerusalem	33	19	14	2552	2491	+61	Advance to Play-offs
4	Maccabi Tel Aviv	33	19	14	2771	2660	+111	Advance to Play-offs
5	Bnei Herzliya	33	18	15	2639	2670	−31	Advance to Play-offs
6	Ironi Nahariya	33	18	15	2668	2595	+73	Advance to Play-offs
7	Maccabi Rishon LeZion	33	17	16	2689	2644	+45	Advance to Play-offs
8	Maccabi Haifa	33	16	17	2716	2588	+128	Advance to Play-offs
9	Hapoel Gilboa Galil	33	15	18	2601	2753	−152	
10	Hapoel Tel Aviv	33	14	19	2725	2810	−85	
11	Maccabi Ashdod	33	13	20	2531	2621	−90	
12	Maccabi Kiryat Gat (R)	33	6	27	2501	2850	−349	Relegated to Liga Leumit

Source: Basket.co.il
(R) Relegated

=== Results ===
==== Rounds 1–22 ====
Home \ Away	BNE	KIR	HGG	HOL	JER	NAH	ASH	EIL	HAI	RIS	MTA	HTA
Bnei Herzliya		79–64	73–79	74–81	94–73	64–67	83–71	83–74	87–79	71–69	84–82	86–81
Maccabi Kiryat Gat	79–80		86–90	67–75	79–88	90–98	77–79	74–96	69–75	82–78	79–103	82–75
Hapoel Gilboa Galil	82–83	66–80		93–100	77–73	62–106	75–77	84–69	73–94	93–92	80–77	86–81
Hapoel Holon	55–59	98–66	77–61		99–76	61–79	84–66	78–86	80–75	92–77	73–78	80–78
Hapoel Jerusalem	81–61	89–50	100–75	79–85		75–67	75–67	81–92	93–71	79–59	74–63	72–65
Ironi Nahariya	72–75	80–72	72–73	75–80	78–81		76–69	79–86	83–73	76–72	93–97	77–86
Maccabi Ashdod	94–70	90–68	87–63	68–90	70–57	70–82		93–82	59–72	77–84	66–72	68–85
Hapoel Eilat	91–84	82–66	100–81	81–66	62–55	71–81	85–77		85–93	88–94	94–86	89–72
Maccabi Haifa	99–65	80–85	78–83	73–75	86–69	96–75	89–68	81–72		68–73	81–83	86–89
Maccabi Rishon LeZion	89–73	77–69	75–73	84–69	68–82	97–85	80–58	66–60	79–83		84–93	86–87
Maccabi Tel Aviv	92–99	91–67	91–92	81–72	85–83	99–93	91–85	95–77	97–96	83–81		87–73
Hapoel Tel Aviv	84–77	99–67	87–85	84–92	83–70	92–71	81–97	90–84	77–82	90–86	83–94	

Source: Ligat Winner
Legend: Blue = home team win; Red = away team win.

==== Rounds 23–33 ====
Home \ Away	BNE	KIR	HGG	HOL	JER	NAH	ASH	EIL	HAI	RIS	MTA	HTA
Bnei Herzliya						99–87		71–79	96–94		94–88	75–60
Maccabi Kiryat Gat	101–95		79–82		75–79	83–84					65–84	
Hapoel Gilboa Galil							95–85	69–76	82–84			
Hapoel Holon	79–75	100–72			71–73		99–70			91–79		100–102
Hapoel Jerusalem	84–82		80–86			91–80			69–63			93–80
Ironi Nahariya				78–68			75–68	80–78	78–69	70–71		
Maccabi Ashdod	84–68	85–70			92–74					74–91	80–70	
Hapoel Eilat		81–90	76–66	84–81	86–80		90–69			94–85		91–84
Maccabi Haifa		99–78		74–85			77–82	84–86		88–71		95–79
Maccabi Rishon LeZion	110–104	94–87	83–69		83–59						74–88	
Maccabi Tel Aviv			85–87	79–80		64–77		73–76	63–79			100–74
Hapoel Tel Aviv		99–83	65–80			80–105	91–86					

Source: Ligat Winner
Legend: Blue = home team win; Red = away team win.

== Play-offs ==
Team 1	Series	Team 2	Game 1	Game 2	Game 3	Game 4	Game 5
Hapoel Holon	1–3	Maccabi Haifa	104–99	70–101	77–78	82–99	
Maccabi Tel Aviv	3–0	Bnei Herzliya	87–73	89–63	105–68		
Hapoel Jerusalem	3–2	Ironi Nahariya	85–86	64–77	84–75	74–72	71–60
Hapoel Eilat	2–3	Maccabi Rishon LeZion	93–83	73–97	63–70	94–91	77–82

Source: Ligat Winner

== Final Four ==
Semi-finals; 12 June
Maccabi Tel Aviv	74
Maccabi Haifa	85
Maccabi Rishon LeZion	76
Hapoel Jerusalem	93

Final; 15 June
Maccabi Haifa	76
Hapoel Jerusalem	83

== Final standings ==
Pos	Team	Pld	W	L	PF	PA	PD	Qualification or relegation
1	Hapoel Jerusalem (C)	40	24	16	3106	3013	+93	Qualification to 2017–18 EuroCup Basketball
2	Maccabi Haifa	39	20	19	3254	3078	+176	
3	Maccabi Tel Aviv (Note: Maccabi Tel Aviv was automatically qualified for the EuroLeague, as the club was an A-licence holder which guarantees its participation for each season.)	37	22	15	3126	2949	+177	Qualification to 2017–18 EuroLeague
4	Maccabi Rishon LeZion	39	20	19	3188	3127	+61	
5	Hapoel Holon	37	23	14	3042	2899	+143	Qualification to 2017–18 Basketball Champions League
6	Hapoel Eilat	38	23	15	3127	3048	+79	
7	Bnei Herzliya	36	18	18	2843	2951	−108	Qualification to 2017–18 FIBA Europe Cup
8	Ironi Nahariya	38	20	18	3038	2973	+65	
9	Hapoel Gilboa Galil	33	15	18	2601	2753	−152	
10	Hapoel Tel Aviv	33	14	19	2725	2810	−85	
11	Maccabi Ashdod	33	13	20	2531	2621	−90	
12	Maccabi Kiryat Gat (R)	33	6	27	2501	2850	−349	Relegation to Liga Leumit

Source: Ligat Winner
(C) Champions; (R) Relegated

== Statistical leaders ==
=== Efficiency ===
Pos	Player	Club	PIR
1	(United States) Murphy Holloway	Hapoel Gilboa Galil	20.5
2	(Venezuela) Gregory Vargas	Maccabi Haifa	19.3
3	(Israel) Jake Cohen	Maccabi Ashdod	18.8

=== Points ===
Pos	Player	Club	PPG
1	(United States) Mark Lyons	Hapoel Tel Aviv	20.1
2	(United States) Khalif Wyatt	Hapoel Holon	18.8
3	(United States) Josh Selby	Maccabi Kiryat Gat	17.5

=== Rebounds ===
Pos	Player	Club	RPG
1	(Israel) Karam Mashour	Bnei Herzliya	10.3
2	(United States) Murphy Holloway	Hapoel Gilboa Galil	10.0
3	(United States) Darion Atkins	Hapoel Holon	8.6

=== Assists ===
Pos	Player	Club	APG
1	(Venezuela) Gregory Vargas	Maccabi Haifa	6.8
2	(United States) Pierria Henry	Hapoel Eilat	6.1
3	(United States) Derwin Kitchen	Ironi Nahariya	5.8

Source: Basket.co.il

=== Season highs ===
Category		Player	Club
Points	38	(United States) Gilbert Brown	Ironi Nahariya
Rebounds	19	(Israel) Karam Mashour	Bnei Herzliya
Assists	14	(United States) Derwin Kitchen	Ironi Nahariya
Blocks	6	2 occasions	
Steals	8	(United States) Justin Carter	Maccabi Kiryat Gat

Source: RealGM

== All-Star Game ==
The 2017 Israeli League All-star event was held on 18 April 2017, at the Menora Mivtachim Arena in Tel Aviv.

Israeli All-Stars
Pos	Player	Team
Starters
G	(Israel) Gal Mekel	Maccabi Tel Aviv
G	(Israel) Bar Timor	Hapoel Jerusalem
F	(Israel) Shawn Dawson	Maccabi Rishon LeZion
F	(Israel) Karam Mashour	Bnei Herzliya
F	(Israel) Lior Eliyahu	Hapoel Jerusalem
Reserves
G	(Israel) Afik Nissim	Hapoel Eilat
G	(Israel) Tamir Blatt	Hapoel Tel Aviv
G	(Israel) (Argentina) Ezequiel Skverer	Hapoel Gilboa Galil
G	(Israel) Shlomi Harush	Hapoel Holon
G	(Israel) Yiftach Ziv	Maccabi Ashdod
G	(Israel) Eyal Shulman	Maccabi Kiryat Gat
F	(Israel) Oz Blayzer	Maccabi Haifa
F	(Israel) (Sweden) Jonathan Skjöldebrand	Ironi Nahariya
C	(Israel) Itay Segev	Maccabi Tel Aviv
C	(Israel) Daniel Koperberg	Maccabi Haifa
Head coach: (Israel) Dan Shamir (Hapoel Holon)
Head coach: (Israel) Oded Kattash (Hapoel Eilat)

International All-Stars
Pos	Player	Team
Starters
G	(United States) Mark Lyons	Hapoel Tel Aviv
F	(United States) Chase Simon	Maccabi Ashdod
F	(United States) Victor Rudd	Maccabi Tel Aviv
F	(United States) Jeff Adrien	Bnei Herzliya
C	(United States) Amar'e Stoudemire	Hapoel Jerusalem
Reserves
G	(Venezuela) Gregory Vargas	Maccabi Haifa
G	(United States) Josh Selby	Maccabi Kiryat Gat
G	(United States) Nick Faust	Ironi Nahariya
F	(United States) Landon Milbourne	Hapoel Eilat
F	(United States) Charles Thomas	Maccabi Rishon LeZion
F	(United States) Eric Griffin	Hapoel Gilboa Galil
F	(United States) Darion Atkins	Hapoel Holon
Head coach: (Latvia) Ainars Bagatskis (Maccabi Tel Aviv)
Head coach: (Israel) Mickey Gorka (Bnei Herzliya)

April 18, 2017

Boxscore

Israeli All-Stars	127–139	International All-Stars
Scoring by quarter: 32-33, 25-37, 27-35, 43-34
Pts: Segev 20; Rebs: Skjöldebrand & Ziv 8 Asts: Ziv 7		Pts: Stoudemire 18; Rebs: Stoudemire & Thomas 8 Asts: Selby 8

Menora Mivtachim Arena, Tel Aviv
Attendance: 7,000

=== Three-point shootout ===
Contestants
Pos.	Player	Team	First round	Final round
G	(Mexico) Orlando Méndez-Valdez (W)	Maccabi Haifa	15	12
F	(Israel) (Sweden) Jonathan Skjöldebrand	Ironi Nahariya	18	7
F	(Israel) Guy Pnini	Maccabi Tel Aviv	14	-
G	(Israel) Afik Nissim	Hapoel Eilat	12	-
G	(Israel) Amit Simhon	Maccabi Haifa	11	-
G	(United States) Josh Selby	Maccabi Kiryat Gat	10	-
F	(United States) Chase Simon	Maccabi Ashdod	9	-
G	(United States) Mark Lyons	Hapoel Tel Aviv	9	-

=== Slam Dunk Contest ===
Contestants
Pos.	Player	Team	First round	Final round
F	(United States) Eric Griffin (W)	Hapoel Gilboa Galil	50	45
F	(United States) Michael Qualls	Hapoel Gilboa Galil	45	40
F	(United States) Adom Jacko	Bnei Herzliya	45	-
C	(Israel) Daniel Koperberg	Maccabi Haifa	38	-
G	(United States) Nick Faust	Ironi Nahariya	-	-

== Awards ==
=== Yearly awards ===
==== Regular season MVP ====
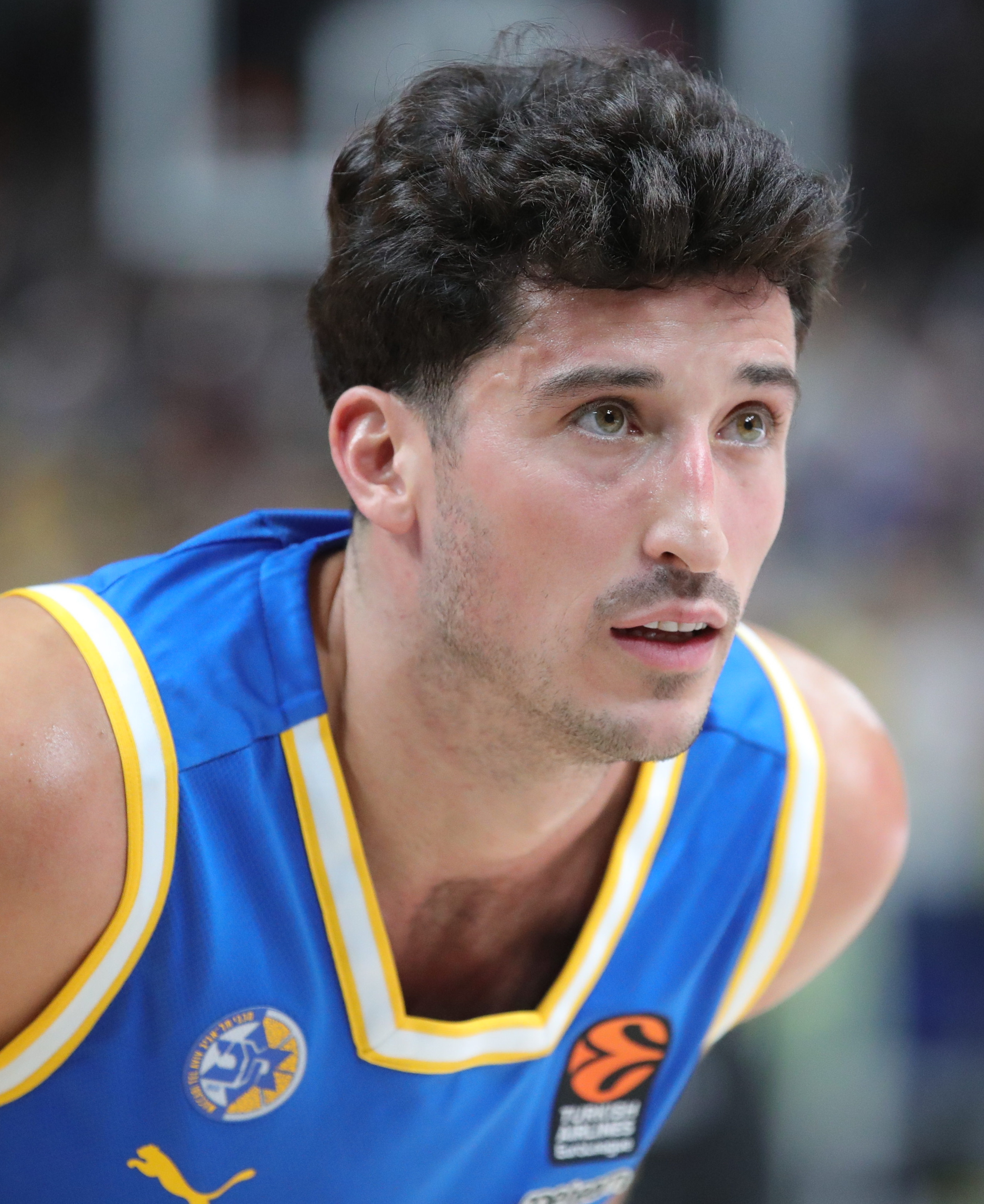
John DiBartolomeo

- (United States) (Israel) John DiBartolomeo (Maccabi Haifa)

==== All-BSL 1st team ====
- (United States) (Israel) John DiBartolomeo (Maccabi Haifa)
- (United States) Curtis Jerrells (Hapoel Jerusalem)
- (United States) Andrew Goudelock (Maccabi Tel Aviv)
- (United States) James Bell (Hapoel Holon)
- (Israel) Karam Mashour (Bnei Herzliya)

==== All-BSL 2nd team ====
- (Venezuela) Gregory Vargas (Maccabi Haifa)
- (Israel) Rafi Menco (Hapoel Eilat)
- (United States) Landon Milbourne (Hapoel Eilat)
- (Sweden) (Israel) Jonathan Skjöldebrand (Ironi Nahariya)
- (United States) Darion Atkins (Hapoel Holon)

==== Coach of the Season ====
- (Italy) Simone Pianigiani (Hapoel Jerusalem)

==== Rising Star ====
- (Israel) Tomer Ginat (Hapoel Tel Aviv)

==== Best Defender ====
- (Venezuela) Gregory Vargas (Maccabi Haifa)

==== Most Improved Player ====
- (Israel) Idan Zalmanson (Maccabi Rishon LeZion)
- (Israel) Rafi Menco (Hapoel Eilat)

==== Sixth Man of the Season ====
- (United States) Jason Siggers (Hapoel Gilboa Galil)

=== Monthly Awards ===
==== Player of the Month ====
Month	Player	Team	EFF	Ref
October	(United States) Darion Atkins (1/2)	Hapoel Holon	24.8	
November	(United States) Richard Howell	Hapoel Tel Aviv	24.3	
December	(United States) Khalif Wyatt	Hapoel Holon	23.2	
January	(United States) Landon Milbourne	Hapoel Eilat	24.8	
February	(United States) Darion Atkins (2/2)	Hapoel Holon	23.0	
March	(United States) James Bell (1/2)	Hapoel Holon	22.0	
April	(United States) James Bell (2/2)	Hapoel Holon	22.8	

==== Israeli Player of the Month ====
Month	Player	Team	EFF	Ref
October	(Israel) Guy Pnini	Maccabi Tel Aviv	16.3	
November	(Israel) Karam Mashour (1/3)	Bnei Herzliya	15.0	
December	(Israel) Karam Mashour (2/3)	Bnei Herzliya	18.0	
January	(Israel) Oz Blayzer	Maccabi Haifa	23.0	
February	(Israel) Gal Mekel	Maccabi Tel Aviv	17.0	
March	(Israel) Rafi Menco	Hapoel Eilat	25.7	
April	(Israel) Karam Mashour (3/3)	Bnei Herzliya	24.0	

==== Coach of the Month ====
Month	Coach	Team	W-L	Ref
October	(Israel) Dan Shamir (1/3)	Hapoel Holon	3–1	
November	(Israel) Mickey Gorka	Bnei Herzliya	3–1	
December	(Israel) Dan Shamir (2/3)	Hapoel Holon	4–0	
January	(Israel) Eric Alfasi	Ironi Nahariya	3–1	
February	(Israel) Oded Kattash (1/2)	Hapoel Eilat	4–1	
March	(Israel) Dan Shamir (3/3)	Hapoel Holon	3–1	
April	(Israel) Oded Kattash (2/2)	Hapoel Eilat	5–0	

=== MVP of the Round ===
==== Regular season ====
Round	Player	Team	EFF	Ref.
October
1	(United States) Daniel Ewing	Maccabi Ashdod	23	
2	(United States) Alando Tucker	Hapoel Tel Aviv	37	
3	(United States) Jason Siggers (1/3)	Hapoel Gilboa Galil	16	
November
4	(United States) Curtis Jerrells	Hapoel Jerusalem	34	
5	(United States) James Bell (1/4)	Hapoel Holon	33	
6	(Israel) Karam Mashour	Bnei Herzliya	28	
7	(United States) D. J. Seeley	Maccabi Tel Aviv	23	
8	(United States) Stephen Dennis	Bnei Herzliya	29	
December
9	(United States) Khalif Wyatt (1/2)	Hapoel Holon	44	
10	(United States) Murphy Holloway	Hapoel Gilboa Galil	37	
11	(United States) (Israel) John DiBartolomeo	Maccabi Haifa	45	
12	(United States) James Bell (2/4)	Hapoel Holon	34	
January
13	(United States) Landon Milbourne	Hapoel Eilat	39	
14	(Israel) Gal Mekel	Maccabi Tel Aviv	32	
15	(Israel) Oz Blayzer (1/2)	Maccabi Haifa	39	
15	(Israel) Amit Simhon	Maccabi Haifa	32	
16	(United States) Khalif Wyatt (2/2)	Hapoel Holon	24	
February
17	(Israel) Shawn Dawson	Maccabi Rishon LeZion	23	
18	(United States) Amar'e Stoudemire	Hapoel Jerusalem	29	
19	(United States) Mark Lyons	Hapoel Tel Aviv	37	
20	(United States) Preston Knowles	Maccabi Ashdod	24	
March
21	(Israel) Oz Blayzer (2/2)	Maccabi Haifa	24	
22	(Israel) Tomer Ginat	Hapoel Tel Aviv	29	
23	(Israel) Rafi Menco	Hapoel Eilat	29	
24	(United States) James Bell (3/4)	Hapoel Holon	30	
April
25	(United States) Jeff Adrien	Bnei Herzliya	36	
26	(United States) Tyrone Nash	Ironi Nahariya	40	
27	(United States) Chase Simon	Maccabi Ashdod	24	
28	(Venezuela) Gregory Vargas	Maccabi Haifa	26	
29	(United States) James Bell (4/4)	Hapoel Holon	27	
May
30	(Israel) Orr Leumi	Bnei Herzliya	25	
31	(United States) Jason Siggers (2/3)	Hapoel Gilboa Galil	46	
32	(United States) Jason Siggers (3/3)	Hapoel Gilboa Galil	28	
33	(United States) Kevinn Pinkney	Maccabi Haifa	35	

==== Playoffs ====
Round	Player	Team	EFF	Ref.
1	(United States) Tu Holloway	Hapoel Holon	31	
2	(United States) (Israel) John DiBartolomeo	Maccabi Haifa	31	
3	(United States) (Israel) Willy Workman	Maccabi Haifa	26	
4	(United States) Pierriá Henry	Hapoel Eilat	37	

== Attendance ==
Included playoffs games.

Pos	Team	Total	High	Low	Average	Change
	Final Four matches	30,860	11,060	10,287	9,900	n/a
1	Hapoel Jerusalem	129,440	10,547	3,637	6,472	n/a
2	Maccabi Tel Aviv	100,500	10,500	1,650	5,025	n/a
3	Hapoel Holon	65,300	4,800	1,800	3,265	n/a
4	Hapoel Tel Aviv	47,400	3,400	1,000	2,963	n/a
5	Maccabi Haifa	37,630	4,200	1,300	2,091	n/a
6	Ironi Nahariya	34,250	2,500	1,500	1,903	n/a
7	Maccabi Rishon LeZion	32,450	2,500	900	1,803	n/a
8	Bnei Herzliya	21,200	1,500	900	1,178	n/a
9	Hapoel Eilat	21,450	1,250	800	1,073	n/a
10	Hapoel Gilboa Galil	15,970	1,500	550	1,065	n/a
11	Maccabi Ashdod	13,850	1,700	400	866	n/a
12	Maccabi Kiryat Gat	11,270	1,700	70	704	n/a
	League total	561,570	11,060	70	2,576	n/a

Updated to games played on 15 June 2017
Source: Israeli Basketball Super League

== Other articles ==
- 2016–17 Israeli Basketball State Cup
- 2016 Israeli Basketball League Cup
