= Landon Milbourne =

American basketball player (born 1987)

Free agent
- Position: Small forward / power forward

Personal information
- Born: June 29, 1987 (age 39)
- Listed height: 6 ft 7 in (2.01 m)
- Listed weight: 210 lb (95 kg)

Career information
- High school: St. Francis (Roswell, Georgia); Oak Hill (Mouth of Wilson, Virginia)
- College: Maryland (2006–2010)
- NBA draft: 2010: undrafted
- Playing career: 2010–present

Career history
- 2010–2011: SOMB
- 2011–2012: Limoges CSP
- 2012–2014: Panionios
- 2014–2015: Pistoia
- 2015–2016: San Sebastián Gipuzkoa
- 2016: Atenienses de Manatí
- 2016–2017: Hapoel Eilat
- 2017–2018: Vanoli Cremona
- 2018–2019: Maccabi Ashdod

Career highlights
- LNB Pro B champion (2012); All-Israeli League Second Team (2017); Israeli League All-Star (2017)

Landon Milbourne (born June 29, 1987) is an American professional basketball player who last played for Maccabi Ashdod of the Israeli Premier League. He played college basketball at the University of Maryland before playing professionally in France, Greece, Italy, Spain, Puerto Rico and Israel. Milbourne is a left-handed 2.01 m (6 ft 7 in) tall small forward-power forward.

== Early life and college career ==
Milbourne attended St. Francis in Roswell, Georgia, where he led the squad to a 29–1 record during his junior campaign. Milbourne averaged 23.0 points, 9.0 rebounds, and 4.0 blocked shots as a junior and was named Defensive Player of the Year as a sophomore and junior.

Milbourne played his senior season at Oak Hill Academy and helped the Warriors to a record of 40–1, setting a new school record for single-season wins. He was one of five players to average double figures in scoring (10.3 ppg) and connected on 56 percent of his shots from the floor and made 52 percent from beyond the three-point line.

Milbourne played college basketball for the University of Maryland's Terrapins, where he led team in blocked shots (35) and FG% (.491). He finished 2nd on team in scoring (11.4 ppg), rebounding (5.2 rpg) in his senior year.

== Professional career ==
=== Boulogne (2010–2011) ===
After going undrafted in the 2010 NBA draft, Milbourne joined the Atlanta Hawks for the 2010 NBA Summer League. Milbourne started his professional career with SO Maritime Boulogne of the French Second Division.

=== Limoges CSP (2010–2011) ===
In 2011, Milbourne also played in the French Second Division with Limoges CSP. On October 29, 2011, Milbourne recorded a career-high 35 points, shooting 16-of-28 from the field, along with eight rebounds and two steals in a 106–72 blowout win over Denain Voltaire Basket. Milbourne helped Limoges to promote to the LNB Pro A as the regular season champion of the LNB Pro B season.

=== Panionios (2012–2014) ===
On August 4, 2012, Milbourne signed a two-year deal with the Greek team Panionios. On December 5, 2012, Milbourne recorded a season-high 26 points, shooting 10-of-17 from the field in a 101–100 win over Oostende.

=== Pistoia (2014–2015) ===
On August 13, 2014, Milbourne signed with the Italian team Giorgio Tesi Group Pistoia for the 2014–15 season.

=== Gipuzkoa / Manatí (2015–2016) ===
On August 27, 2015, Milbourne signed a one-year deal with the Spanish team San Sebastián Gipuzkoa. However, on January 19, 2016, Milbourne parted ways with Gipuzkoa after appearing in eleven games. Six days later, Milbourne signed with the Puerto Rican team Atenienses de Manatí for the rest of the season.

=== Hapoel Eilat (2016–2017) ===
On August 24, 2016, Milbourne signed with Israeli team Hapoel Eilat for the 2016–17 season. On January 9, 2017, Milbourne recorded a season-high 32 points, shooting 10-of-14 from the field, along with four steals in a 94–86 win over Maccabi Tel Aviv. He was subsequently named Israeli League Round 13 MVP. On February 1, 2017, Milbourne was named Israeli League Player of the Month for games played in January. On April 18, 2017, Milbourne participated in the 2017 Israeli All-Star Game.

In 38 games played during the 2016–17 season, Milbourne averaged 16 points, 4.5 rebounds, 1.2 assists and 1.5 steals per game, shooting 40.3 percent from 3-point range. Milbourne helped Eilat to reach the 2017 Israeli League Playoffs as the second seed, but they eventually were eliminated by Maccabi Rishon LeZion in the Quarterfinals. On June 9, 2017, Milbourne earned a spot in the All-Israeli League Second Team.

=== Vanoli Cremona (2017–2018) ===
On August 1, 2017, Milbourne returned to Italy for a second stint, signing a one-year deal with Vanoli Cremona. Milbourne helped Cremona to reach the 2018 Italian League Playoffs as the eighth seed, but they eventually were eliminated by Reyer Venezia. He averaged 8.1 points and 2.8 rebounds per game.

=== Maccabi Ashdod (2018–2019) ===
On August 2, 2018, Milbourne returned to Israel for a second stint, signing with Maccabi Ashdod for the 2018–19 season. On January 5, 2019, Milbourne recorded a season-high 27 points, shooting 4-for-6 from the 3-point range, along with three assists and two steals in an 80–84 loss to Hapoel Holon. In 15 games played for Ashdod, Milbourne averaged 16.3 points, 2.9 rebounds, 1.9 assists and 1.5 steals per game. On February 4, 2019, Milbourne parted ways with Ashdod.

== Personal life ==
His father, Andre Foreman, was a Division III All-American at Salisbury and played professionally in Europe.

== Career statistics ==
Legend
GP	Games played	GS	Games started	MPG	Minutes per game
FG%	Field goal percentage	3P%	3-point field goal percentage	FT%	Free throw percentage
RPG	Rebounds per game	APG	Assists per game	SPG	Steals per game
BPG	Blocks per game	PPG	Points per game	**Bold**	Career high

=== EuroCup ===
Year	Team	GP	GS	MPG	FG%	3P%	FT%	RPG	APG	SPG	BPG	PPG	PIR
2012–13	(Greece) Panionios	5	5	26.8	.415	.235	.875	2.2	1.6	.8	.6	11.0	7.4
2013–14	(Greece) Panionios	16	14	26.9	.460	.269	.688	3.5	.6	.8	.5	10.1	8.5
