= Tony Younger =

American-Israeli basketball player

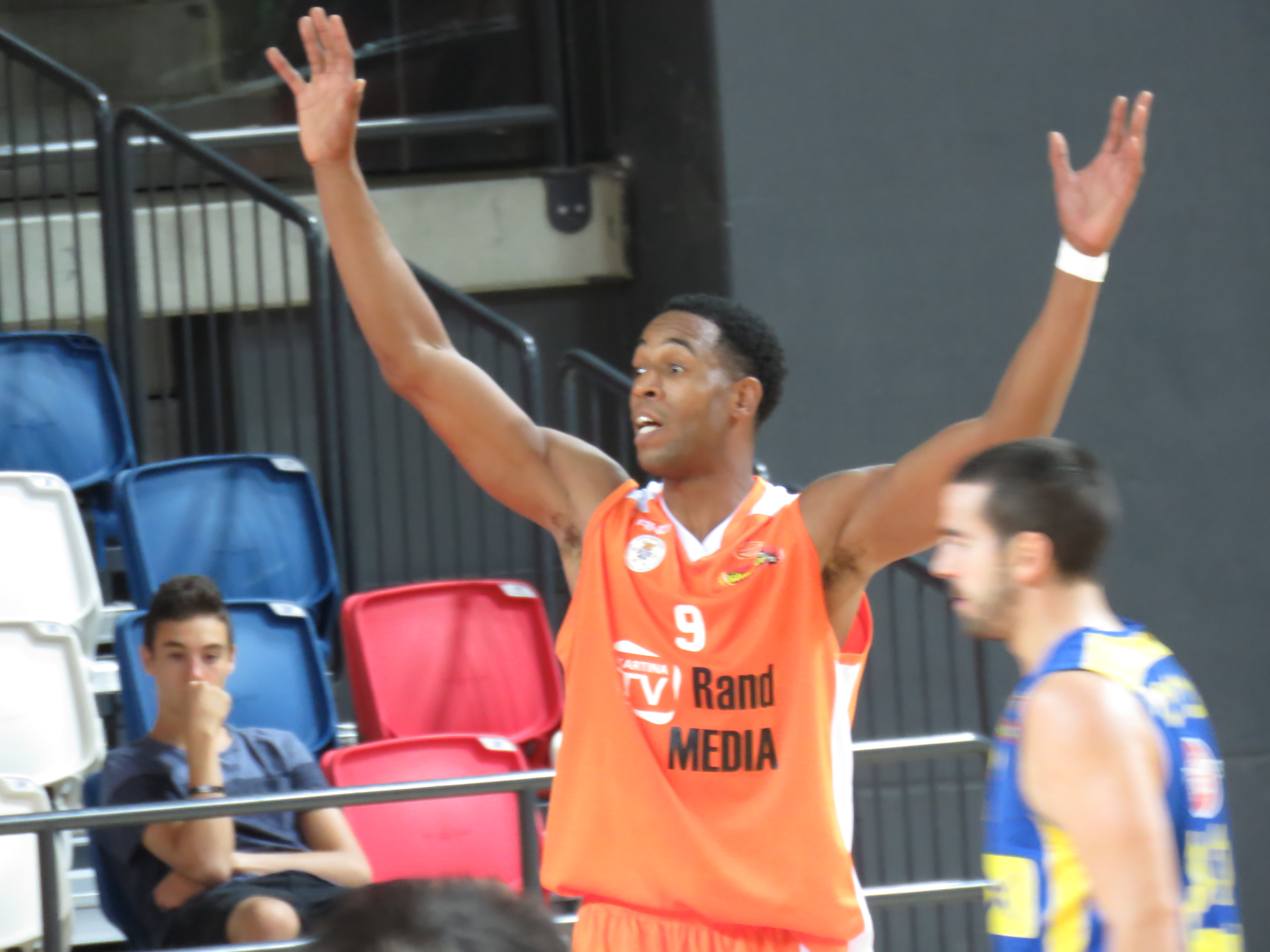
- Tony Younger in 2015

Personal information
- Born: April 1, 1980 (age 46) Hartford, Connecticut, U.S.
- Listed height: 6 ft 6 in (1.98 m)
- Listed weight: 210 lb (95 kg)

Career information
- College: Spring Hill (1998–2002)
- NBA draft: 2002: undrafted
- Playing career: 2002–2021
- Position: Small forward
- Coaching career: 2021–present

Career history

Playing
- 2002–2003: Maccabi Kiryat Bialik
- 2004: Elitzur Givat Shmuel
- 2004–2005: Maccabi Rishon LeZion
- 2005–2007: Ironi Kiryat Ata
- 2007–2008: Barak Netanya
- 2008–2009: TF Budapest
- 2009–2011: Barak Netanya
- 2011–2012: Ironi Kiryat Ata
- 2012–2013: Hapoel Eilat
- 2013–2014: Hapoel Gilboa Galil
- 2014–2016: Maccabi Rishon LeZion
- 2016–2017: Hapoel Holon
- 2017–2018: Hapoel Be'er Sheva
- 2018–2019: Hapoel Haifa
- 2019: Elitzur Yavne
- 2019–2021: Hapoel Hevel Modi'in

Coaching
- 2021–2022: Maccabi Rishon Lezion (assistant)
- 2022–2023: Ironi Ness Ziona (assistant)

Career highlights
- Israeli Premier League champion (2016); Israeli National League champion (2018)

Anthony Gordon Younger (Hebrew: אנתוני גורדון יאנגר; born April 1, 1980) is an American-Israeli professional basketball coach and former player. He most recently worked as assistant coach for Ironi Ness Ziona of the Israeli Premier League. He played college basketball at Spring Hill College before playing professionally in Israel and Hungary. Standing at 6 ft 6 in (1.98 m), he primarily played the small forward position.

== Early life and college career ==
Younger was born and raised in Hartford, Connecticut. He played college basketball for the Spring Hill College's Badgers, alongside his teammates Eric Campbell and Mickey Gorka.

== Professional career ==
In 2002, Younger started his professional career with Maccabi Kiryat Bialik of the Israeli National League, the second-tier league in Israel. He averaged 24.6 points per game, leading his team to the National League Semifinals.

In 2008, Younger signed with TF Budapest of the Hungarian Basketball League, where he averaged 13.8 points, 7.5 rebounds, 1.5 assists and 2.3 steals per game in the 2008–09 season.

On September 12, 2009, Younger returned to Barak Netanya for a second stint, signing a one-year deal.

In 2011, Younger returned to Ironi Kiryat Ata for a second stint. He went on to average 19.1 points, 7.4 rebounds and 2.5 assists per game, shooting 40.6 percent from three-point range.

On August 6, 2012, Younger signed a one-year deal with Hapoel Eilat of the Israeli Premier League.

On August 12, 2013, Younger signed with Hapoel Gilboa Galil for the 2013–14 season. Younger helped Gilboa Galil reach the 2014 Balkan League Finals, where they eventually lost to Levski Sofia.

On July 9, 2014, Younger returned to Maccabi Rishon LeZion for a second stint, signing a two-year deal. On February 21, 2015, Younger recorded an Israeli Premier League career-high 20 points, shooting 7-of-9 from the field, in an 81–73 win over Hapoel Tel Aviv. In 39 games played during the 2014–15 season, he averaged 10 points, 4.9 rebounds, 2.4 assists and 1.6 steals per game, leading Rishon LeZion to the 2015 Israeli League Semifinals, where they were eliminated by Hapoel Jerusalem. On June 9, 2016, Younger won the 2016 Israeli League championship title with Rishon LeZion after scoring 10 points in the final against Hapoel Jerusalem.

On July 28, 2016, Younger signed with Hapoel Holon for the 2016–17 season.

On August 9, 2017, Younger signed a one-year deal with Hapoel Be'er Sheva of the Israeli National League. Younger finished the season as the league three-point field goal percentage leader with 43.6 per game. Younger went on to win the Israeli National League championship title with Be'er Sheva.

On November 28, 2018, Younger signed a one-year deal with Hapoel Haifa. On January 25, 2019, Younger parted ways with Haifa to join Elitzur Yavne for the rest of the season.

On September 1, 2019, Younger signed with Hapoel Hevel Modi'in for the 2019–20 season.

== Personal life ==
In 2011, Younger converted to Judaism and became an Israeli citizen.
