= 2015 Israeli Basketball League Cup =

Israeli basketball pre-season tournament

2015 Israeli League Cup
Tournament details
- Arena: Holon Toto Hall / Drive in Arena; Holon / Tel Aviv

Final positions
- Champions: Maccabi Tel Aviv (6th title)
- Runners-up: Hapoel Eilat

Awards and statistics
- MVP: (United States) Devin Smith

Israeli basketball in 2015–16
League (Final Four)	State Cup	League Cup

The 2015 Israeli Basketball League Cup, for sponsorships reasons the Winner League Cup, was the 10th edition of the pre-season tournament of the Israeli Basketball Super League. Maccabi Tel Aviv won the title for the 6th time. Hapoel Eilat were runners-up.

The tournament was held from 24 September 2015 until 28 September 2015 and the games were played in both the Holon Toto Hall in Holon and in the Drive in Arena in Tel Aviv.

== Bracket ==
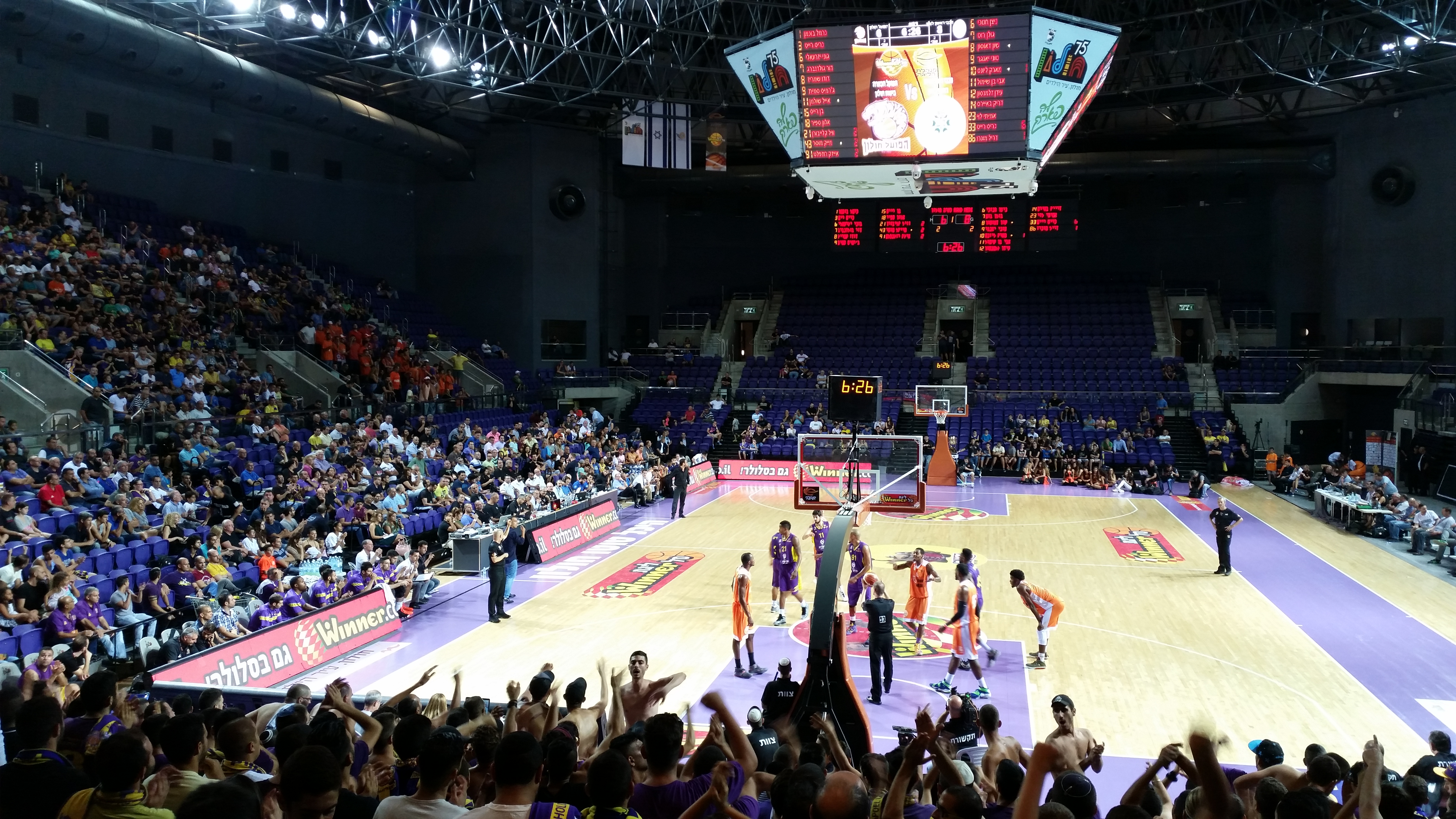
Hapoel Holon vs. Maccabi Rishon LeZion on 27 September

Quarterfinals; 24–25 September
1	Maccabi Tel Aviv	84
8	Ironi Nes Ziona	54
3	Hapoel Holon	65
6	Maccabi Rishon	80
2	Hapoel Jerusalem	66
7	Hapoel Tel Aviv	72
4	Hapoel Eilat	83
5	Maccabi Haifa	75

Semifinals; 27 September
1	Maccabi Tel Aviv	95
6	Maccabi Rishon	89
7	Hapoel Tel Aviv	83
4	Hapoel Eilat	91

Final; 28 September
1	Maccabi Tel Aviv	87
4	Hapoel Eilat	80

== Final ==
September 28, 2015	Hapoel Eilat	80–87	Maccabi Tel Aviv	Drive in Arena, Tel Aviv
18:30	Scoring by quarter: 13–17, 23–22, 24–24, 20–24
	Pts: Leslie 19; Rebs: Leslie 8 Asts: Wyatt, Nissim 4	Statistics	Pts: Smith 27; Rebs: Smith 9 Asts: Farmar 8	Attendance: 3,400

Hapoel Eilat	Maccabi Tel Aviv

2015 League Cup Winners Maccabi Tel Aviv; 6th title
