= Israeli Basketball Premier League Finals MVP =

Award

The Israeli Basketball Premier League Finals MVP, or Israeli Basketball Super League Finals MVP, is an annual basketball award that is presented to the most valuable player of the finals of the playoffs of the Israeli Basketball Premier League, which is the top-tier level professional basketball league in Israel.

== Winners ==
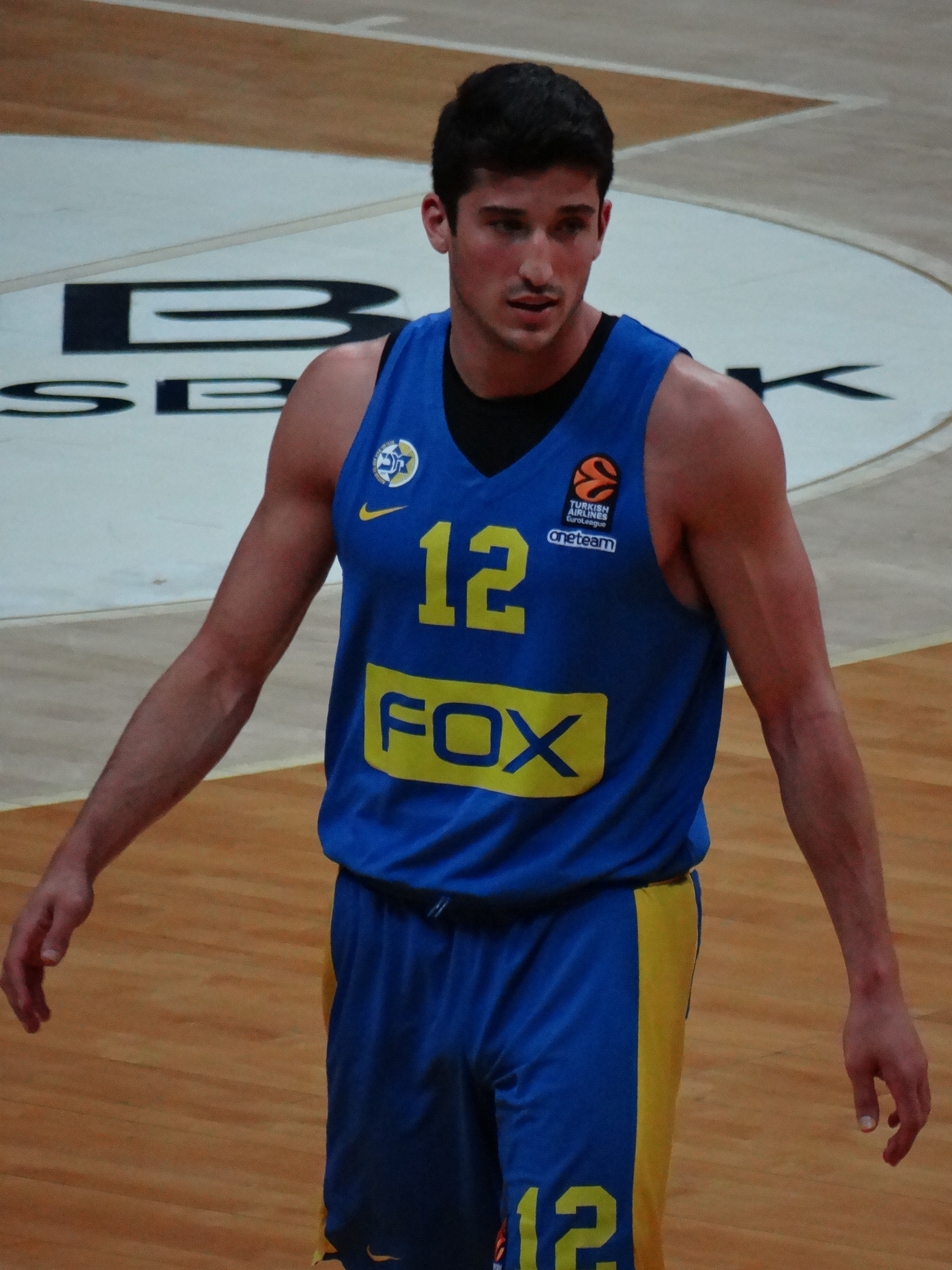
John DiBartolomeo

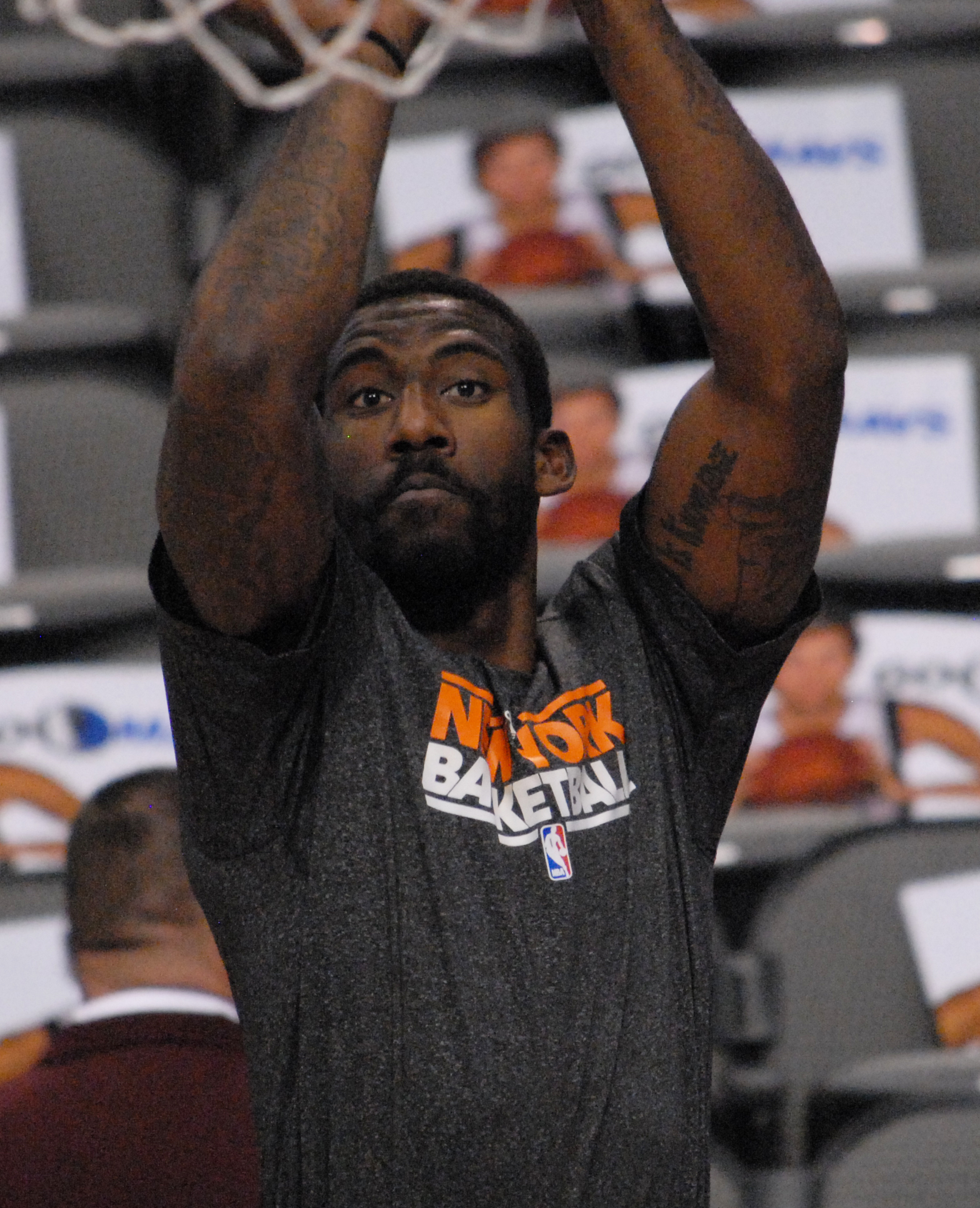
Amar'e Stoudemire

Key
§	Player's team lost the Finals

Israeli Premier League Finals/Final Four MVP winners
Season	Finals MVP	Position	Team
2005–06	(Croatia) Nikola Vujčić	C	Maccabi Tel Aviv
2006–07	(United States) Will Bynum	PG	Maccabi Tel Aviv
2007–08	(United States) P. J. Tucker	SF	Hapoel Holon
2008–09	(Puerto Rico) Carlos Arroyo	PG	Maccabi Tel Aviv
2009–10	(United States) Brian Randle	PF	Hapoel Gilboa Galil
2010–11	(United States) (Israel) David Blu	PF	Maccabi Tel Aviv
2011–12	(Israel) Yogev Ohayon	PG	Maccabi Tel Aviv
2012–13	(Greece) (United States) Pat Calathes	SF	Maccabi Haifa
2013–14	(Israel) Dagan Yivzori	SG	Maccabi Haifa §
2014–15	(United States) Bracey Wright	PG	Hapoel Jerusalem
2015–16	(United States) Darryl Monroe	C	Maccabi Rishon LeZion
2016–17	(United States) Jerome Dyson	PG	Hapoel Jerusalem
2017–18	(United States) (Israel) Alex Tyus	C	Maccabi Tel Aviv
2018–19	(United States) (Israel) John DiBartolomeo	PG	Maccabi Tel Aviv
2019–20	(United States) (Israel) Amar'e Stoudemire	C	Maccabi Tel Aviv
2020–21	(United States) Scottie Wilbekin	PG/SG	Maccabi Tel Aviv
2021–22	(United States) Joe Ragland	PG/SG	Hapoel Holon
2022–23	(United States) Wade Baldwin	SG	Maccabi Tel Aviv
2023–24	(Israel) Roman Sorkin	C	Maccabi Tel Aviv
2024–25	Not awarded due to a war with Iran		
2025–26	(Denmark) Gabriel Lundberg	SG	Maccabi Tel Aviv
