= 2015–16 Israeli Basketball State Cup =

2015–16 Israeli State Cup
- Season: 2015–16
- Games played: 17
- Teams: 16

Finals
- Champions: Maccabi Tel Aviv (43rd title)
- Runners-up: Maccabi Ashdod
- Finals MVP: (Israel) Gal Mekel

Israeli basketball in 2015–16
League (Final Four)	State Cup	League Cup

The 2015–16 Israeli Basketball State Cup was the 56th edition of the national cup tournament of Israeli basketball. Maccabi Tel Aviv took the title, and won its 7th straight State Cup title.

== Bracket ==
Quarterfinals
Maccabi Tel Aviv	73
Maccabi Haifa	70
Hapoel Ramat Gan	79
Ironi Nes Ziona	91
Maccabi Rishon LeZion	78
Bnei Herzliya	77
Maccabi Kiryat Gat	79
Maccabi Ashdod	91

Semifinals
Maccabi Tel Aviv	81
Ironi Nes Ziona	66
Maccabi Rishon LeZion	82
Maccabi Ashdod (OT)	84

Finals
Maccabi Tel Aviv	83
Maccabi Ashdod	75

== Final ==
18 February 2016	Maccabi Tel Aviv	83–75	Maccabi Ashdod	Tel Aviv
20:00	Scoring by quarter: 26–18, 24–20, 15–21, 18–16
	Pts: Mekel 21		Pts: Thomas 30	Arena: Menora Mivtachim Arena

Maccabi Tel Aviv	Maccabi Ashdod
