= Isaiah Swann =

American basketball player (born 1985)

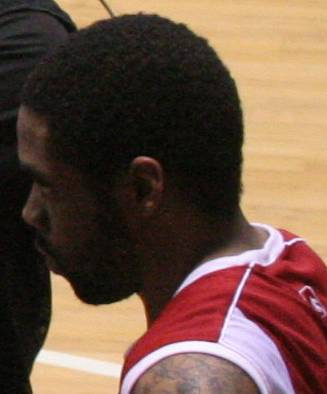
- Swann with Hapoel Gilboa Galil in 2009

Personal information
- Born: February 10, 1985 (age 41) Germantown, Maryland, U.S.
- Listed height: 6 ft 2 in (1.88 m)
- Listed weight: 195 lb (88 kg)

Career information
- High school: Hargrave Military Academy (Chatham, Virginia)
- College: Florida State (2004–2008)
- NBA draft: 2008: undrafted
- Playing career: 2008–2021
- Position: Point guard / shooting guard

Career history
- 2008–2009: Andrea Costa Imola
- 2009–2010: Hapoel Gilboa Galil
- 2010: Rio Grande Valley Vipers
- 2010–2011: Maccabi Rishon LeZion
- 2011–2012: ratiopharm Ulm
- 2012–2013: Gaziantep Basketbol
- 2013–2014: Phantoms Braunschweig
- 2014: İstanbul BB
- 2014–2015: Maccabi Rishon LeZion
- 2015–2016: Maccabi Ashdod
- 2016–2017: Cholet Basket
- 2017: Marinos
- 2017–2018: Comunicaciones Mercedes
- 2018: Universo Treviso
- 2018: Toros de Aragua
- 2018–2019: Kleb Basket Ferrara
- 2021: Cañeros del Este

Career highlights
- Israeli League champion (2010); 2× Israeli League All-Star (2015, 2016); All-BBL First Team (2012); BBL All-Star Game MVP (2014)

Isaiah Swann (born February 10, 1985) is an American professional basketball player. He played college basketball for Florida State University before playing professionally in Italy, Israel, Turkey, Germany, France, Argentina and Venezuela.

== Early life and college career ==
Swann attended Hargrave Military Academy in Chatham, Virginia. He played college basketball for Florida State University's Seminoles.

In his senior year at Florida State, Swann averaged 11.7 points, 3.1 rebounds, 2.8 assists and 1 steal per game.

== Professional career ==
In 2008, Swann started his professional career with the Italian team Andrea Costa Imola.

On March 4, 2009, Swann signed a two-year deal with the Israeli team Hapoel Gilboa Galil. In his second season with the team, Swann won the 2010 Israeli League Championship with Gilboa Galil, alongside Jeremy Pargo, Brian Randle and Dion Dowell.

On November 1, 2010, Swann was selected by the Rio Grande Valley Vipers in the sixth round of the 2010 NBA D-League Draft. One month later, Swann returned to Israel to sign with Maccabi Rishon LeZion for the remainder of the season.

On July 4, 2011, Swann signed with the German team ratiopharm Ulm for the 2011–12 season. That year, Swann earned a spot in the All-BBL First Team and led Ulm to the 2012 BBL Finals, where they eventually were defeated by Brose Bamberg.

On June 30, 2012, Swann signed with the Turkish team Gaziantep Basketbol for the 2012–13 season.

On August 6, 2013, Swann returned to Germany and signed with Phantoms Braunschweig for the 2013–14 season. Swann participated in the BBL All-Star Game and was named the All-Star MVP. Swann finished the season as the league second-leading scorer with 17.9 points per game.

On August 22, 2014, Swann signed with the Turkish team İstanbul BB for the 2014–15 season. However, On October 22, 2014, Swann parted ways with İstanbul BB and returned to Israel for a second stint, signing with Maccabi Rishon LeZion. On March 3, 2015, Swann participated in the 2015 Israeli All-Star game.

On August 1, 2015, Swann signed with Maccabi Ashdod for the 2015–16 season. On November 2, 2015, Swann recorded a season-high 34 points, shooting 9-of-17 from 3-point range, along with four rebounds and nine assists in a 93–82 win over Hapoel Eilat. On March 25, 2016, Swann participated in the 2016 Israeli League All-Star game and won the Three-Point Shootout contest during the same event.

On June 28, 2016, Swann signed with the French team Cholet Basket for the 2016–17 season. However, On February 17, 2017, Swann parted ways with Cholet and signed with the Venezuelan team Marinos for the remainder of the season. On May 18, 2017, Swann recorded a career-high 47 points, shooting 15-of-19 from 3-point range, along with five assists and four steals in a 120–59 blowout win over Gaiteros del Zulia.

On August 4, 2017, Swann signed with the Argentinian team Comunicaciones Mercedes for the 2017–18 season. However, on January 10, 2018, he parted ways with Mercedes to sign with the Italian team Universo Treviso for the rest of the season.

On August 29, 2018, Swann signed a one-year deal with Kleb Basket Ferrara, On December 2, 2018, Swann recorded a season-high 44 points, shooting 9-of-13 from three-point range, along with 10 assists, eight rebounds and four steals in a 90–78 win over Pallacanestro Mantovana. Swann went on to average a career-high 22.4 points, to go with 5.1 rebounds and 4.2 assists per game.

On August 3, 2019, Swann signed with Juvecaserta for the 2019–20 season.

== Career statistics ==
Legend
GP	Games played	MPG	Minutes per game	FG%	Field goal percentage
3P%	3-point field goal percentage	FT%	Free throw percentage	RPG	Rebounds per game
APG	Assists per game	SPG	Steals per game	BPG	Blocks per game
PPG	Points per game	**Bold**	Career high		Led the league

=== Domestic Leagues ===
Year	Team	League	GP	MPG	FG%	3P%	FT%	RPG	APG	SPG	BPG	PPG
2009	(Israel) H. Gilboa Galil	IPL	7	18.6	**.525**	**.520**	.750	1.9	1.1	.9	.3	8.1
2009–10	(Israel) H. Gilboa Galil	IPL	22	21.7	.420	.430	.800	2.6	2.3	**1.5**	.1	9.1
2010	(United States) RGV Vipers	D-League	3	15.3	.235	.286	**.909**	2	1.6	.3	.3	7.3
2010–11	(Israel) M. Rishon LeZion	IPL	20	29.6	.490	.350	.870	3.6	4.3	1.2	**.5**	12.9
2011–12	(Germany) Ulm	BBL	41	27.9	.421	.369	.872	2.8	2.7	.8	0	15.7
2012–13	(Turkey) Gaziantep	BSL	25	31.4	.409	.326	.866	4.1	3.3	.6	.1	13.8
2013–14	(Germany) Braunschweig	BBL	34	32.3	.409	.352	.866	4.1	3.3	1	.1	17.9
2014–15	(Israel) M. Rishon LeZion	IPL	37	27.6	.396	.349	.812	3.1	**4.5**	1.1	.1	12.3
2015–16	(Israel) M. Ashdod	IPL	32	31.7	.388	.390	.843	4	3.8	1.1	0	14.6
2016–17	(France) Cholet	Pro A	16	26.9	.417	.398	.860	3	3.3	.9	.1	13.1
2017	(Venezuela) Marinos	LPB	**50**	29.3	.447	.392	.848	3.9	3.3	.9	.1	16.5
2017–18	(Argentina) Mercedes	TNA	7	29.2	.310	.250	.692	**5.2**	3.7	1.1	.2	10.7
2018	(Italy) Universo Treviso	Serie A2	23	23.6	.473	.443	.636	2.8	2.6	.8	.0	11.9
2018–19	(Italy) Kleb Basket Ferrara	Serie A2	29	**34.6**	.407	.393	.816	5.1	4.2	1.0	.1	**22.4**

Sources: Basket.co.il & RealGM
