= Darryl Monroe =

American basketball player (born 1986)

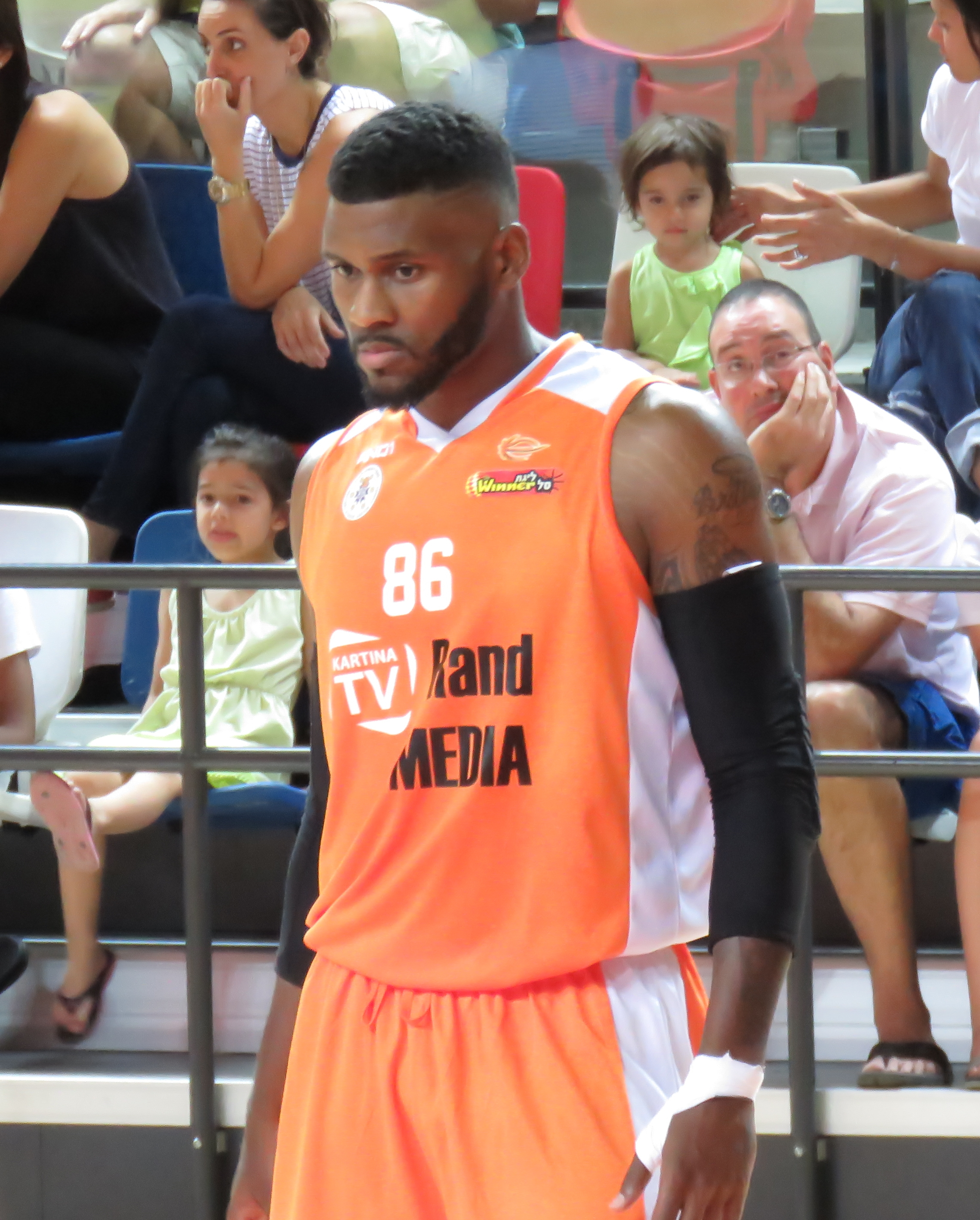
- Monroe with Maccabi Rishon LeZion in 2015

No. 86 – Seoul SK Knights
- Position: Power forward / center
- League: Korean Basketball League

Personal information
- Born: January 30, 1986 (age 40) Virginia Beach, Virginia, U.S.
- Listed height: 6 ft 7 in (2.01 m)
- Listed weight: 229 lb (104 kg)

Career information
- High school: First Colonial (Virginia Beach, Virginia)
- College: Central Florida CC (2004–2006); George Mason (2006–2009)
- NBA draft: 2009: undrafted
- Playing career: 2009–present

Career history
- 2009–2010: Aris Leeuwarden
- 2010–2011: SO Maritime Boulogne
- 2011–2013: Boulazac Dordogne
- 2013–2014: Manresa
- 2014–2015: Scaligera Verona
- 2015–2016: Maccabi Rishon LeZion
- 2016: Uşak Sportif
- 2016–2018: Türk Telekom
- 2018–2019: Goyang Orions
- 2019–2021: Maccabi Rishon LeZion
- 2021–2024: Anyang Jung Kwan Jang Red Boosters
- 2024–2025: Changwon LG Sakers
- 2025–present: Seoul SK Knights

Career highlights
- 2× KBL champion (2023, 2025); EASL Champions Week champion (2023); Turkish First League champion (2018); Israeli League champion (2016); Israeli League MVP (2016); Israeli Basketball Premier League Finals MVP (2016); All-Israeli League First Team (2016); FIBA Europe Cup Starting Five (2016); Italian Second League MVP (2015); Italian Second Cup winner (2015); French League All-Star (2013); Second-team All-CAA (2009)

Darryl Monroe Jr. (born January 30, 1986) is an American professional basketball player for the Seoul SK Knights of the Korean Basketball League (KBL). A power forward/center, he played college basketball for Central Florida CC and the George Mason Patriots before playing professionally in the Netherlands, France, Spain, Italy, Israel, Turkey and South Korea. Playing for Maccabi Rishon LeZion, he was named the 2016 Israeli Basketball Premier League MVP, and the 2016 Israeli Basketball Premier League Finals MVP.

== Early life and college career ==
Monroe attended First Colonial High School in Virginia Beach, Virginia. He started his college basketball career with Central Florida Community College, where he averaged 17 points, nine rebounds and five assists in his freshman year.

On November 16, 2005, Monroe transferred from Central Florida to George Mason after receiving interest from more than 40 Division I schools before selecting the Patriots.

In his senior year at George Mason, he averaged 10.5 points, 7.7 rebounds, 2 assists and 1.1 steals per game, leading the CAA in field-goal percentage, second in rebounding and fourth in double-doubles. On March 5, 2009, Monroe was named to the Second-team All-CAA.

== Professional career ==
=== Aris Leeuwarden (2009–2010) ===
In 2009, Monroe started his professional career with Aris Leeuwarden of the Dutch Eredivisie, where ranked third in the league in scoring at 16.9 points per game, to go with 7.6 rebounds, 3.3 assists and 1.6 steals, shooting 55.8 percent from the field.

=== SO Maritime Boulogne (2010–2011) ===
In 2010, Monroe signed with SO Maritime Boulogne of the French LNB Pro B, where he averaged 12.8 points, 7.8 rebounds, 2.3 assists and 1.5 steals per game, shooting 60 percent from the field. Monroe was ranked in the top 5 in Pro B in rebounding and field-goal percentage. Monroe was a key contributor in an unexpected run by a young Boulogne club to the league semi-finals, including an upset of the highly touted SPO Rouen Basket. In the Rouen series, Monroe had double-doubles of 24 points and 10 rebounds and 15 points and 11 rebounds to lead the team to its victories.

=== Boulazac Dordogne (2011–2013) ===
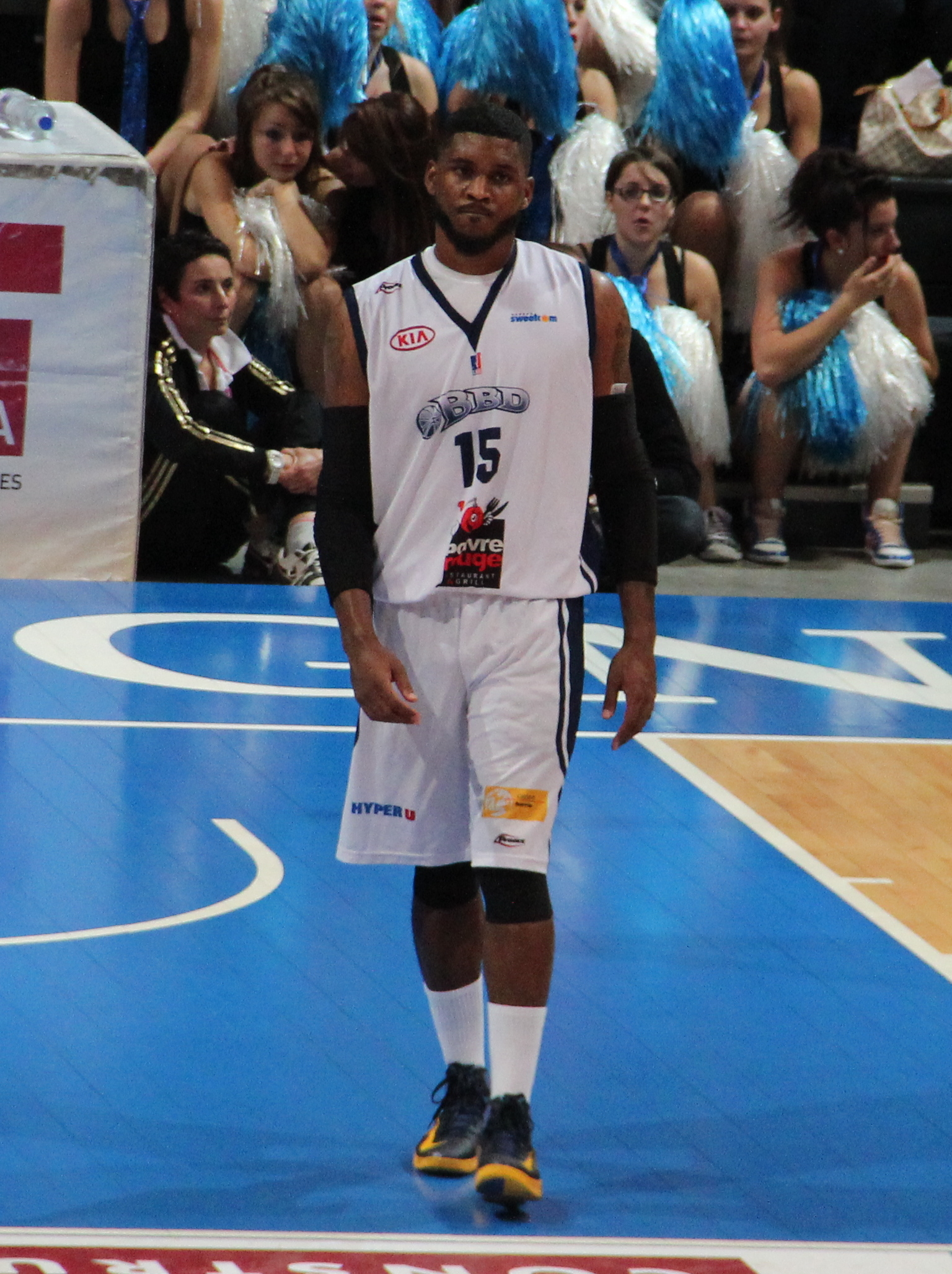
Monroe with Boulazac in 2012

On July 25, 2011, Monroe signed with Boulazac Basket Dordogne. In 40 games played during the 2011–12 season, he averaged 15.6 points, 9.7 rebounds and 3.3 assists per game. Monroe helped Boulazac promote to the French LNB Pro A as the LNB Pro B runner-up.

In his second season with Boulazac, he averaged 14.7 points and 8.8 rebounds per game. His solid play for the season got him an invite to play in the French Pro A All-Star game in 2013.

=== ICL Manresa (2013–2014) ===
On August 14, 2013, Monroe signed with ICL Manresa of the Spanish Liga ACB. In 24 games played during the 2013–14 season, he averaged 13.5 points, 5.8 rebounds and 1.8 assists per game.

=== Scaligera Verona (2014–2015) ===
On August 17, 2014, Monroe signed with Scaligera Basket Verona of the Italian Serie A2, the Italian second division, where he was named the MVP of the league after averaging 17.7 points, 9.4 rebounds and 3.3 assists per game, shooting 60 percent from the field. Monroe helped Verona win the Italian LNP Cup after recording a double-double of 19 points and 14 rebounds in the final game against FMC Ferentino.

=== Maccabi Rishon LeZion (2015–2016) ===
On August 10, 2015, Monroe signed with Maccabi Rishon LeZion of the Israeli Premier League. On October 30, 2015, Monroe was named Israeli League Player of the Month after averaging 19 points, 10 rebounds, 3.3 assists and 2.7 steals in three games played in October. On February 24, 2016, Monroe recorded a double-double with a season-high 30 points and 13 rebounds, shooting 13-of-19 from the field, along with five assists in an 84–86 loss to Maccabi Ashdod.

Monroe led the league in efficiency rating with 24.2 per game and finished third in rebounds (8.8 per game), he also averaged 17.2 points, 3.6 assists, and 1.7 steals per game. On June 3, 2016, Monroe earned a spot in the All-Israeli League First Team and was named the Israeli League Regular Season MVP.

On June 6, 2016, Monroe recorded 29 points, shooting 14-of-17 from the field, along with six rebounds in the final game against Hapoel Jerusalem, leading Rishon LeZion win its first Israeli League Championship after an 83–77 victory. He was subsequently named the Finals MVP.

=== Turkey (2016–2018) ===
On July 27, 2016, Monroe signed with Muratbey Uşak Sportif of the Turkish Basketball Super League. In 8 games played for Uşak, he averaged 13.3 points, 8 rebounds and 1.6 assists per game. On December 16, 2016, Monroe parted ways with Uşak to sign with Türk Telekom for the rest of the season.

In his second season with Türk Telekom, he helped the team promote to the Turkish Basketball Super League as the Turkish First League champions. Monroe averaged 13.9 points, 8.9 rebounds and 3.2 assists per game.

=== Goyang Orions (2018–2019) ===
On August 12, 2018, Monroe signed with Goyang Orions of the Korean Basketball League. In 51 games played for the Orions, he averaged 19.5 points, 11.8 rebounds, 5.4 assists and 1.6 steals per game. Monroe helped the Orions reach the KBL Quarterfinals, where they eventually lost to Jeonju KCC Egis.

=== Return to Rishon LeZion (2019–2021) ===
On April 5, 2019, Monroe returned to Maccabi Rishon LeZion for a second stint, signing for the rest of the season. Monroe led Rishon LeZion to the 2019 Israeli League Final, where he scored a season-high 22 points in an 89–75 loss to Maccabi Tel Aviv.

On June 29, 2019, Monroe signed a two-year contract extension with Rishon LeZion. He averaged 10.6 points and 6.3 rebounds per game. Monroe re-signed with the team on August 11, 2020.

=== Anyang KGC (2021–2024) ===
On August 15, 2021, Monroe signed with Anyang KGC of the Korean Basketball League. In 2023, Monroe won the 2023 EASL Champions Week with Anyang. He later also won his first KBL championship, after Anyang defeated Seoul SK Knights in the finals. On January 19, 2024, he was replaced by Jamil Wilson.

=== Changwon LG Sakers (2024–2025) ===
On June 4, 2024, Monroe signed with the Changwon LG Sakers of the Korean Basketball League (KBL). He won the 2024–25 KBL season championship with Changwon, the first in the club's 28-year history.

=== Seoul SK Knights (2025–present) ===
On July 7, 2025, Monroe signed with the Seoul SK Knights of the Korean Basketball League (KBL). He won the 2024–25 KBL season championship with his previous team, Changwon, the first in the club's 28-year history.

== Career statistics ==
Legend
GP	Games played	MPG	Minutes per game	FG%	Field goal percentage
3P%	3-point field goal percentage	FT%	Free throw percentage	RPG	Rebounds per game
APG	Assists per game	SPG	Steals per game	BPG	Blocks per game
PPG	Points per game	**Bold**	Career high		Led the league

Year	Team	League	GP	MPG	FG%	3P%	FT%	RPG	APG	SPG	BPG	PPG
2015–16	Maccabi Rishon LeZion	Israeli League	40	33.7	.546	**.455**	.677	8.9	3.6	**1.8**	.3	17.6
2017–18	Türk Telekom	Turkish League	29	30.3	**.629**	.000	**.742**	9.3	3.3	1.4	**.4**	14.4
2018–19	Goyang Orions	Korean League	51	**34.2**	.536	.279	.696	**11.9**	**5.5**	1.7	.3	**19.5**
2019–20	Maccabi Rishon LeZion	Israeli League	6	29.2	.403	.200	.688	7.0	3.8	.5	.0	10.3
2020–21	Maccabi Rishon LeZion	Israeli League	22	32.3	.576	.235	.740	7.5	3.8	1.1	.1	12.4
Career		All Leagues	148	32.8	.553	.270	.699	9.7	4.2	1.5	.3	16.6
