= Yuval Sznajderman =

Israeli basketball player

Yuval Sznajderman יובל שנידרמן
No. 50 – Hapoel Ironi Eilat
- Position: Point guard
- League: Israeli Basketball Premier League

Personal information
- Born: December 9, 2002 (age 23)
- Listed height: 6 ft 1 in (1.85 m)
- Listed weight: 180 lb (82 kg)

Career information
- Playing career: 2020–present

Career history
- 2020–2022: Hapoel Jerusalem
- 2022–2023: Maccabi Rishon LeZion
- 2023–2025: Hapoel Gilboa Galil
- 2025–2026: Hapoel Galil Elyon
- 2026–present: Hapoel Ironi Eilat

Yuval Sznajderman (Hebrew: יובל שנידרמן; born December 9, 2002) is an Israeli professional basketball player for Hapoel Ironi Eilat of the Israeli Basketball Premier League. He plays the point guard position. Sznajderman played for the Israeli national team during the 2021 FIBA U20 European Challengers.

== Biography ==
Sznajderman is 6 ft 1 in (185 cm) tall, and weighs 180 pounds (82 kg).

In 2020–21, Sznajderman played for Hapoel Jerusalem and averaged 1.7 points, 1.3 rebounds, 0.4 assists, and 6.8 minutes per game.

In 2021–22, he played for Hapoel Jerusalem and Maccabi Rishon Lezion and averaged 3.4 points, 1.4 rebounds, 0.3 assists, and 10.4 minutes per game.

== International play ==
In 2021, Sznajderman played for Team Israel in the FIBA U20 Euro Challengers.
