= 2016 Israeli Basketball Super League Final Four =

Tournament of the 2015–16 Israeli Basketball Super League

2016 Israeli Final Four
- Season: 2015–2016 Israeli Super League

Tournament details
- Arena: Pais Arena; Jerusalem
- Dates: 6–9 June 2016

Final positions
- Champions: Maccabi Rishon LeZion (1st title)
- Runners-up: Hapoel Jerusalem

Awards and statistics
- MVP: (United States) Darryl Monroe

The 2016 Israeli Final Four was the concluding tournament of the 2015–16 Israeli Basketball Super League. It was the seventh Israeli Final Four, and the event is held for the first time since the 2012 edition. Unlike previous Final Four tournaments, there would not be a third placed game.

The Event was held in the Pais Arena, in Jerusalem between 6 and 9 May 2016. The participating teams were Hapoel Jerusalem, Maccabi Tel Aviv, Hapoel Eilat, and Maccabi Rishon LeZion.

== Venue ==
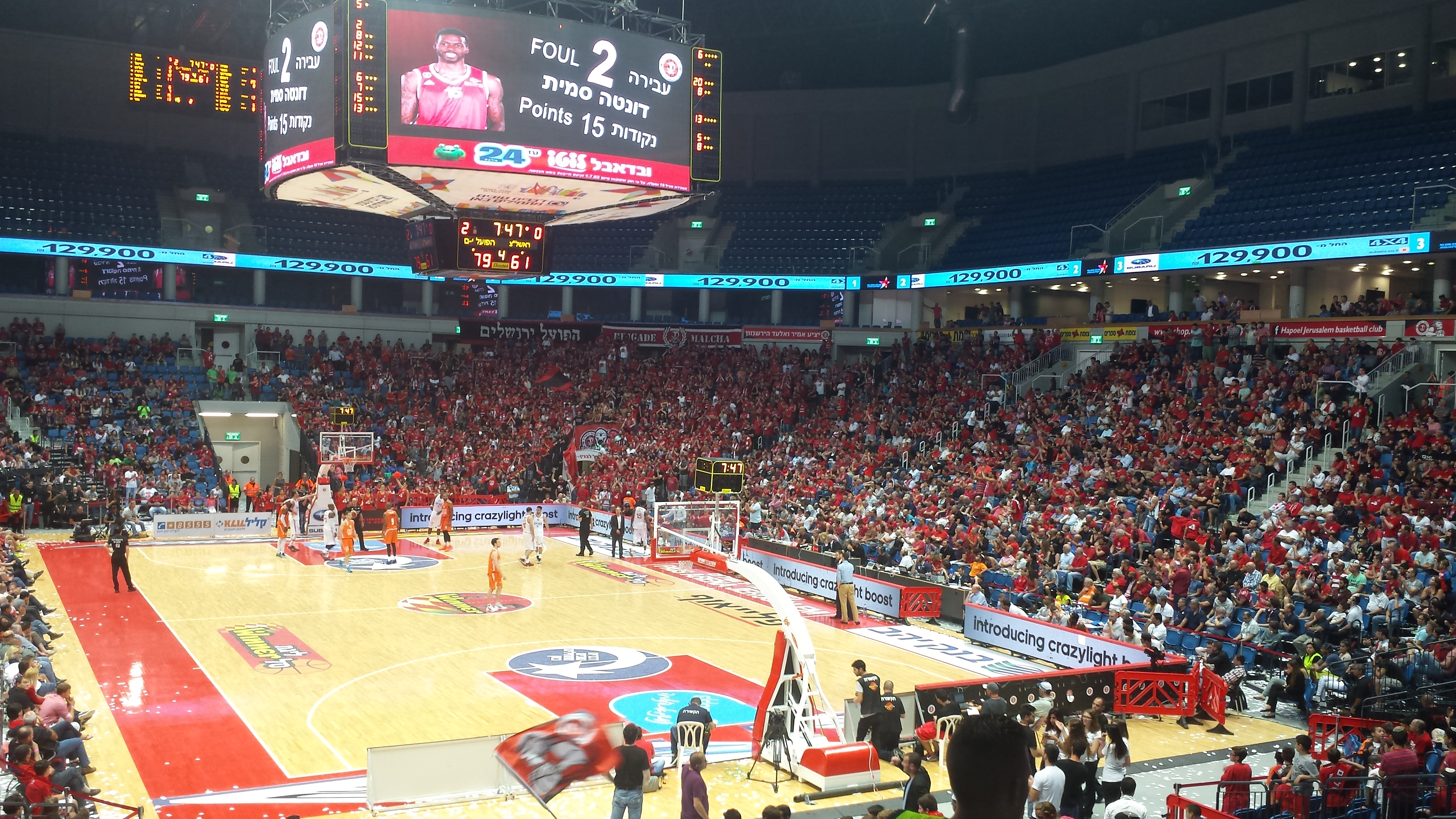
Jerusalem Arena

The Pais Arena is an indoor sports arena in Jerusalem. Opened in 2014 as an open-air venue with a capacity of 11,000.

== Results ==
=== Bracket ===
Semi-finals; 6 June
Hapoel Jerusalem	82
Hapoel Eilat	78
Maccabi Tel Aviv	69
Maccabi Rishon LeZion	71

Final; 9 June
Hapoel Jerusalem	77
Maccabi Rishon LeZion	83

=== Semi-finals ===
All times are in Israel Summer Time.

==== Hapoel Jerusalem vs. Hapoel Eilat ====
6 June 2016	Hapoel Jerusalem	82–78	Hapoel Eilat	Pais Arena, Jerusalem
21:05	Scoring by quarter: 26-21, 19-20, 18-21, 19-16
Channel 1	Pts: Eliyahu 16; Rebs: Eliyahu 12; Asts: Smith 8	Boxscore	Pts: Kane 22; Rebs: Aminu 16; Asts: Aminu, Wyatt 4	Attendance: 9,000; Referees: Omer Esteron, Erez Gurion

==== Maccabi Tel Aviv vs. Maccabi Rishon LeZion ====
6 June 2016	Maccabi Tel Aviv	69–71	Maccabi Rishon LeZion	Pais Arena, Jerusalem
18:10	Scoring by quarter: 16-14, 20-20, 21-21, 12-16
Sport 5	Pts: Rochestie 20; Rebs: Mbakwe 14; Asts: Ohayon 4	Boxscore	Pts: Monroe 20; Rebs: Monroe 8 Asts: Lyons, Ben Chimol 4	Attendance: 7,000; Referees: David Romano, Kfir Mualem, Lior Beynish

=== Final ===
9 June 2016	Hapoel Jerusalem	77–83	Maccabi Rishon LeZion	Pais Arena, Jerusalem
21:00	Scoring by quarter: 28–17, 15–21, 18–26, 16–19
Channel 1	Pts: Gaffney 20; Rebs: Holman 7 Asts: Rowland 6	Boxscore	Pts: Monroe 29; Rebs: Wright 9 Asts: Lyons 7	Attendance: 11,000; Referees: Sefi Shemesh, Gili Cohen, Amit Balak

Starters:			Pts	Reb	Ast
PG	4	(United States) E.J. Rowland	16	4	6
SG	10	(Israel) Yotam Halperin	0	1	2
SF	15	(Venezuela) Donta Smith	14	4	3
PF	8	(Israel) Lior Eliyahu	9	6	4
F/C	3	(United States) Tony Gaffney	20	3	3
Reserves:					
C	32	(United States) Eli Holman	8	7	2
PG	11	(Israel) Bar Timor	8	2	3
SF	12	(Israel) Rafi Menco	2	2	1
PG	14	(Dominican Republic) Édgar Sosa	DNP		
SG	6	(Israel) Yochai Zokrman	DNP		
SG	24	(Israel) Igor Mayor	DNP		
Head coach:
(Israeli Basketball Association) Danny Franco

Jerusalem	Rishon LeZion

Starters:			Pts	Reb	Ast
PG	10	(United States) Mark Lyons	11	3	5
SG	6	(Israel) Nitzan Hanochi	2	4	1
SF	8	(Israel) Shawn Dawson	21	5	3
PF	33	(United States) Chris Wright	13	9	1
F/C	86	(United States) Darryl Monroe	29	6	2
Reserves:					
SF	9	(Israel) Tony Younger	10	2	1
PG	11	(Israel) Avi Ben Chimol	4	3	5
PF	14	(United States) Kevin Palmer	3	0	0
F/C	12	(Israel) Idan Zalmanson	0	0	0
G	7	(Israel) Golan Gutt	DNP		
G	18	(Israel) Tyler Dawson	DNP		
G	21	(Israel) Ofek Hakmon	DNP		
Head coach:
(Israeli Basketball Association) Arik Shivek

== Winning roster ==
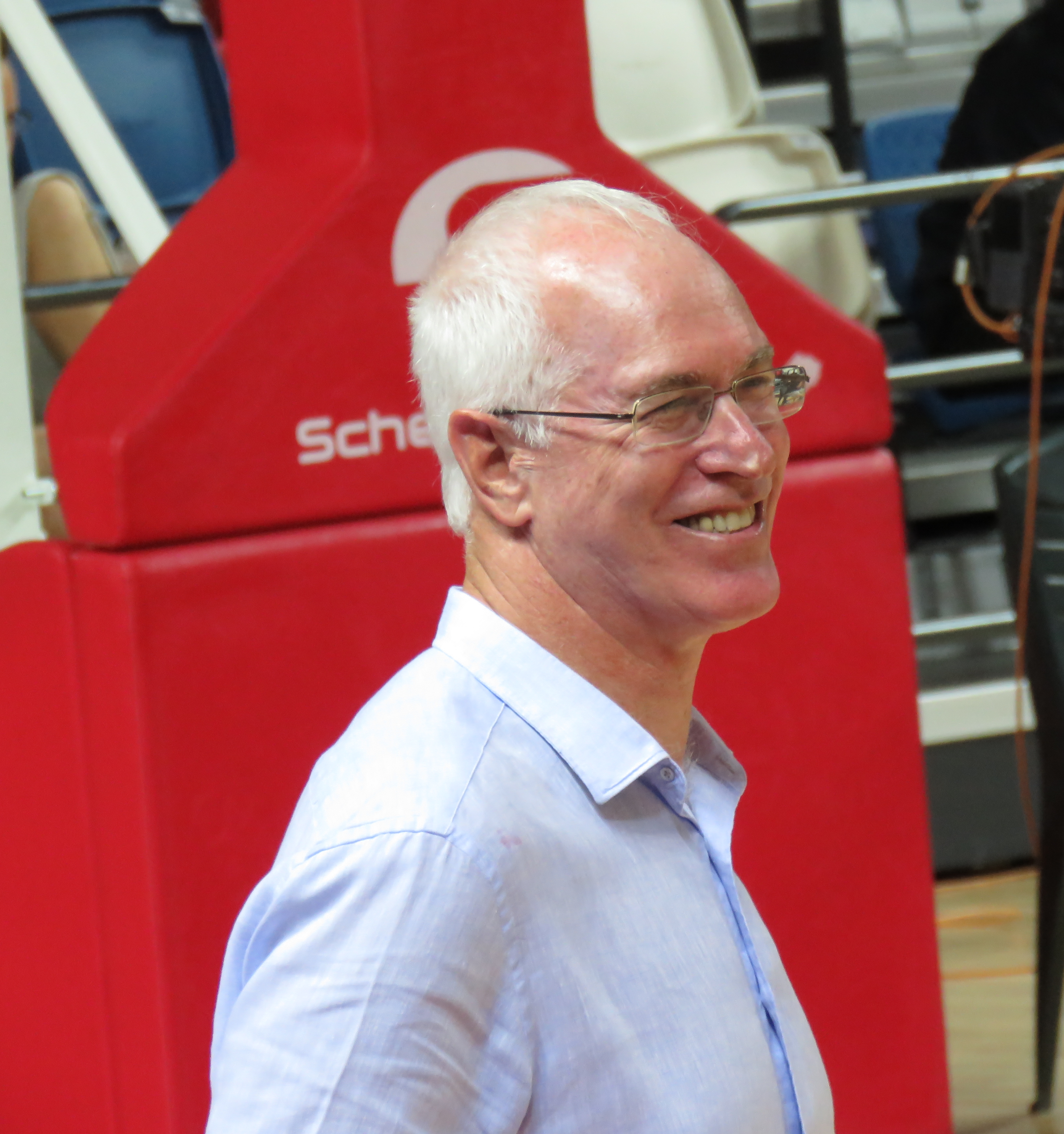
Head coach Arik Shivek

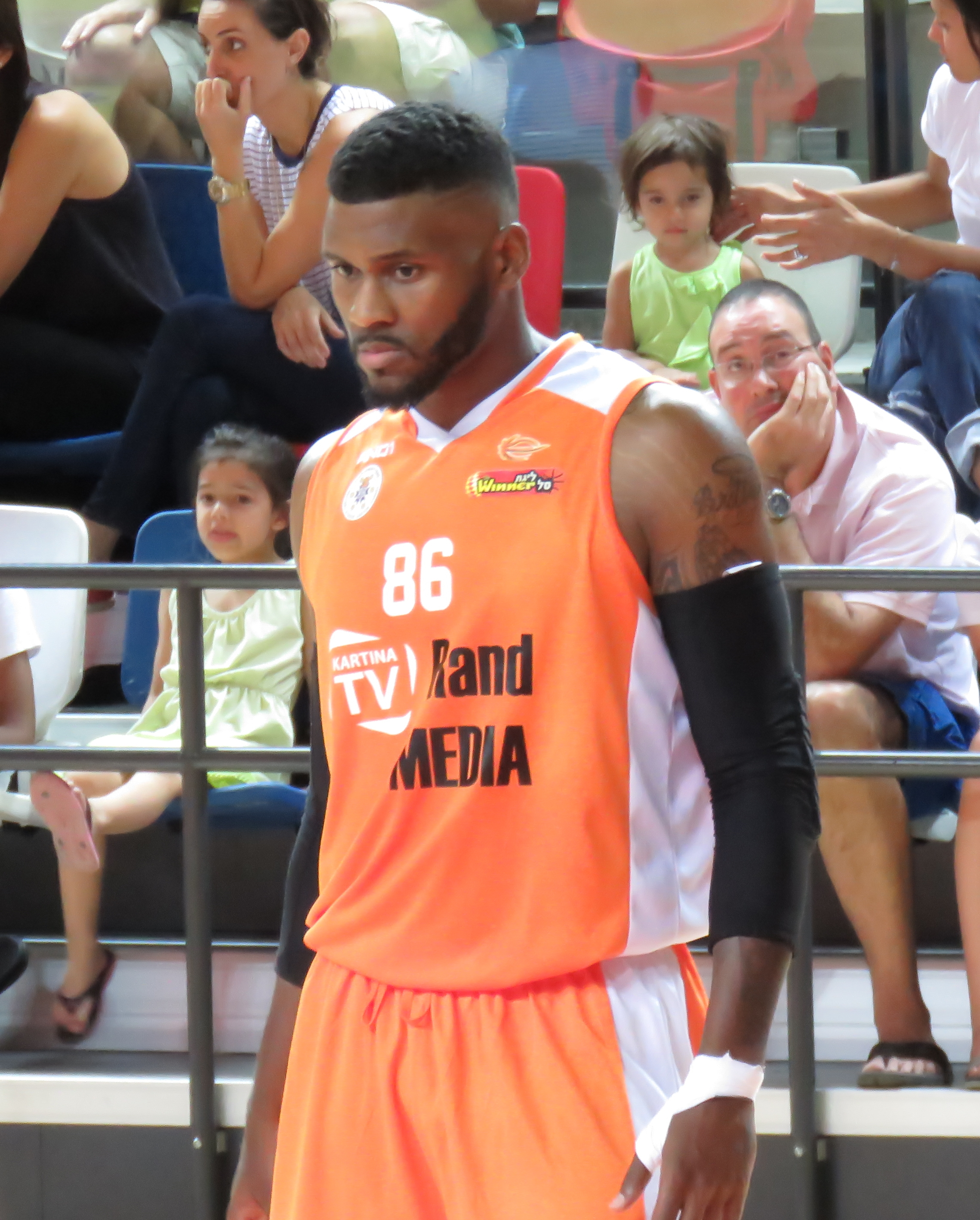
Final Four MVP Darryl Monroe

2015–16 Maccabi Rishon LeZion roster
Players
Coaches

Pos.	No.	Nat.	Name	Ht.
G	6	(Israel)	Hanochi, Nitzan (C)	6 ft 4 in (1.93 m)
G	7	(Israel)	Gutt, Golan	6 ft 2 in (1.88 m)
G/F	8	(Israel)	Dawson, Shawn	6 ft 6 in (1.98 m)
F	9	(United States) (Israel)	Younger, Tony (DC)	6 ft 6 in (1.98 m)
PG	10	(United States)	Lyons, Mark	6 ft 1 in (1.85 m)
PG	11	(Israel)	Ben Chimol, Avi	6 ft 3 in (1.91 m)
F/C	12	(Israel)	Zalmanson, Idan	6 ft 9 in (2.06 m)
F	14	(United States)	Palmer, Kevin	6 ft 6 in (1.98 m)
G	18	(Israel)	Dawson, Tyler	6 ft 1 in (1.85 m)
G	21	(Israel)	Hakmon, Ofek	6 ft 2 in (1.88 m)
F	33	(United States)	Wright, Chris	6 ft 8 in (2.03 m)
F/C	86	(United States)	Monroe, Darryl	6 ft 6 in (1.98 m)

Head coach

- (Israel) Arik Shivek

Assistant coach(es)

- (Israel) Shmulik Brener

Athletic trainer(s)

- (Israel) Yigal Mirovski
- (Israel) Avraham Meidan

Team manager

- (Israel) Ziv Cohen

Legend

- (C) Team captain
- (DC) Dual citizenship
- Injured

- Roster
