= Elad Hasin =

Israeli basketball head coach

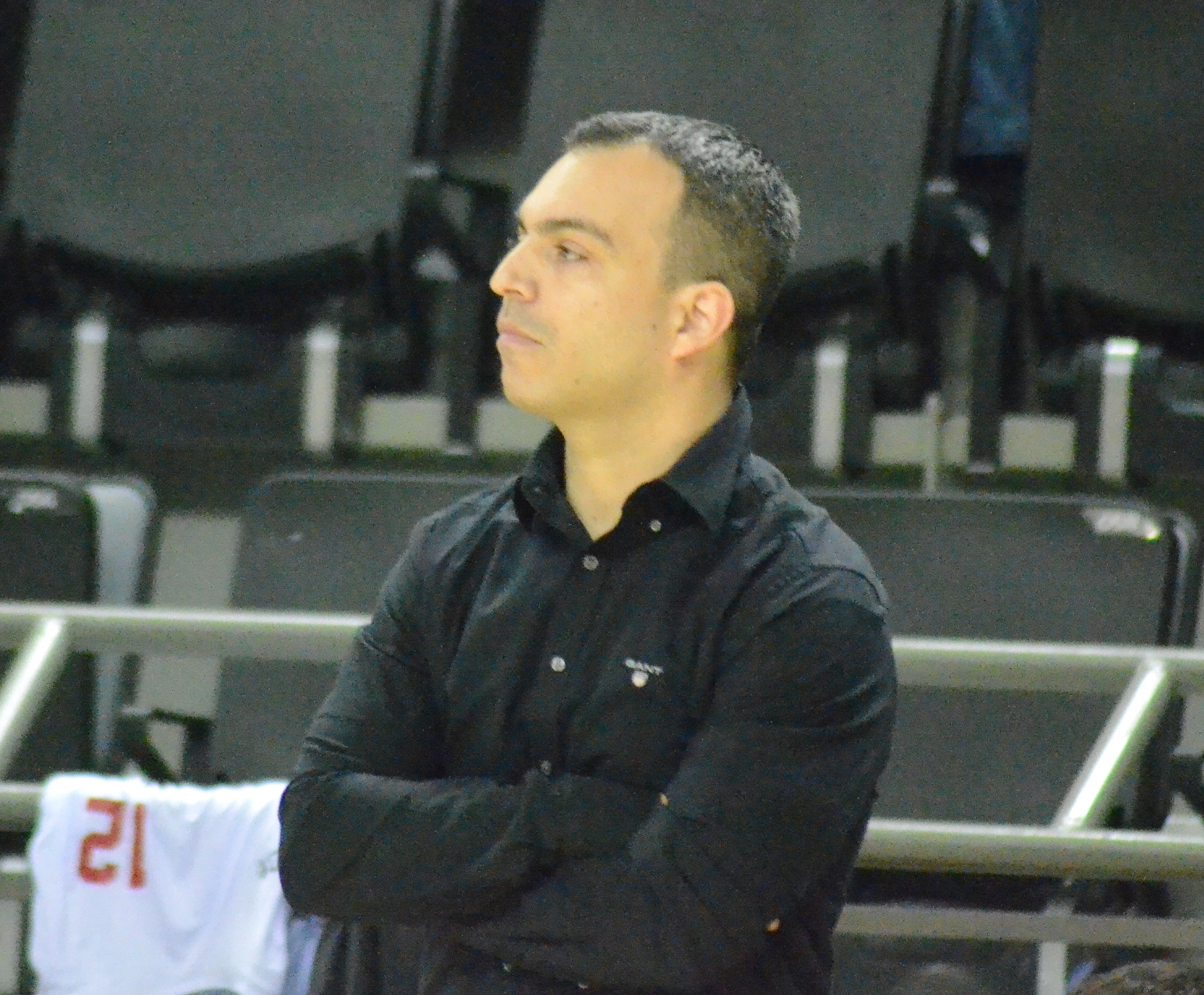
- Hasin with Hapoel Haifa in 2019

Maccabi Ramat Gan
- Position: Head coach
- League: Israeli Basketball Premier League

Personal information
- Born: 20 May 1980 (age 46) Jerusalem, Israel
- Coaching career: 2003–present

Career history

Coaching
- 2004–2005: Bnei Herzliya (assistant)
- 2005–2006: Maccabi Tel Aviv (assistant)
- 2006–2007: Olympiacos (assistant)
- 2009–2010: Maccabi Haifa (assistant)
- 2010: Maccabi Haifa
- 2013–2016: Hapoel Holon
- 2016–2017: Maccabi Kiryat Gat
- 2019–2022: Hapoel Haifa
- 2022–2024: Ironi Ness Ziona
- 2024–2026: Hapoel Haifa
- 2026–present: Maccabi Ramat Gan

Career highlights
- As assistant coach: Israeli League champion (2006); Israeli Cup winner (2006)

Elad Hasin (Hebrew: אלעד חסין; born 20 May 1980) is an Israeli professional basketball coach, currently serving as the head coach for Maccabi Ramat Gan of the Israeli Basketball Premier League.

== Coaching career ==
In 2003, Hasin served as an assistant scout under coach John Calipari at the University of Memphis.

In 2005, Hasin served as assistant coach for Maccabi Tel Aviv under Pini Gershon in the 2005–06 season and also spent the 2006–07 campaign as an assistant to Gershon, this time at Greek powerhouse Olympiacos.

On 21 May 2010, Hasin was named Maccabi Haifa head coach, replacing Avi Ashkenazi. On 30 December 2010, Hasin parted ways with Maccabi Haifa.

On 18 March 2013, Hasin was named Hapoel Holon head coach, replacing Lior Lubin.

On 31 October 2014, Hasin was named Israeli League Coach of the Month for games played in October. Hasin led Holon to the 2015 Israeli League Playoffs as the third seed, but they Eventually lost to Maccabi Rishon LeZion in the Quarterfinals.

On 26 November 2015, Hasin parted ways with Holon after four consecutive losses.

On 10 December 2016, Hasin was named Maccabi Kiryat Gat new head coach.

On 22 February 2019, Hasin joined Hapoel Haifa of the Israeli National League for the rest of the season, replacing Offer Rahimi.
