= Adrian Uter =

Jamaican basketball player (born 1984)

No. 55 – Vaqueros de Bayamón
- Position: Power forward / center
- League: BSN

Personal information
- Born: October 27, 1984 (age 42) Queens, New York, U.S.
- Listed height: 201 cm (6 ft 7 in)
- Listed weight: 102 kg (225 lb)

Career information
- High school: Springfield Gardens (Queens, New York)
- College: Broward CC (2002–2004); Hofstra (2004–2006)
- NBA draft: 2006: undrafted
- Playing career: 2006–present

Career history
- 2006–2007: Swans Gmunden
- 2007–2008: Saint-Vallier
- 2008: Illiabum Clube
- 2008–2009: Hapoel Lev HaSharon
- 2009–2010: Moadon Kadursal HaBikaa
- 2010–2011: Hapoel Tel Aviv
- 2011–2013: Maccabi Rishon LeZion
- 2013: Caciques de Humacao
- 2013–2014: Cantù
- 2014: Leones de Ponce
- 2014–2015: Hapoel Eilat
- 2015: Leones de Ponce
- 2015–2016: Monaco
- 2016–2017: ASVEL
- 2017–2019: Ponce
- 2019: Plateros de Fresnillo
- 2019-2020: Goyang Orions
- 2020: Vaqueros de Bayamón
- 2020–2021: Hapoel Galil Elyon
- 2021–present: Vaqueros de Bayamón

Career highlights
- Israeli National League champion (2021); French League Cup winner (2016); French Supercup winner (2016); French Supercup MVP (2016); 3× Puerto Rican League champion (2014, 2015, 2020); Austrian League champion (2007); Austrian Supercup winner (2006)

Adrian Carlos Uter (born October 27, 1984) is a Jamaican professional basketball player who last played for Vaqueros de Bayamón of the Baloncesto Superior Nacional (BSN).

== Professional career ==
On June 27, 2016, Uter signed with ASVEL Basket of the LNB Pro A.

On December 30, 2019, he signed with Goyang Orions of the Korean Basketball League.

== National team career ==
Uter represents the senior Jamaican national team in international competitions.
