= 2014–15 Israeli Basketball Super League =

2014–2015 Ligat Winner
- Season: 2014–2015
- Duration: 12 October 2014 – 25 June 2015
- Games played: 33 (regular season)
- Teams: 12
- TV partners: Sports Channel, Channel 1

Regular season
- Top seed: Maccabi Tel Aviv
- Season MVP: (Israel) Lior Eliyahu
- Promoted: Ironi Nahariya
- Relegated: Hapoel Gilboa Galil

Finals
- Champions: Hapoel Jerusalem; 1st title
- Runners-up: Hapoel Eilat
- Semifinalists: Maccabi Tel Aviv; Maccabi Rishon LeZion
- Finals MVP: (United States) Bracey Wright
- Playoffs MVP: (Israel) Afik Nissim

Statistical leaders
Points	(United States) Mark Lyons	18.4
Rebounds	(United States) Julian Wright	9.8
Assists	(United States) Jeremy Pargo	6.8

The 2014–2015 Israeli Basketball Super League, for sponsorships reasons known as Ligat Winner Basketball, was the 61st season of the Israeli Basketball Premier League. The season began on October 12, 2014, and ended on June 25, 2014.

The season marked the first time since 1993 that Maccabi Tel Aviv did not reach the Finals, and the third time they failed to finish in either the first or second place. The season was the first time in the league's history to not include a Tel Aviv-based team in the first or second place.

Hapoel Jerusalem B.C. took the Israeli title, after it beat Hapoel Eilat in the Finals.

== Teams ==
=== Changes ===
Teams 2014–15

Barak Netanya has been relegated to Ligat Leumit due to financial difficulties, Making Maccabi Ashdod stay in the league although finishing last in the previous season.
Ironi Nahariya has been promoted to the league after winning Ligat Leumit last season.

=== Stadia and locations ===
Team	Home city	Stadium	Capacity	Last season (Regular season)
Bnei Herzliya	Herzliya	HaYovel Herzliya	1,500	11th
Hapoel Gilboa Galil	Gilboa Regional Council	Gan Ner Sports Hall	2,100	QF (8th)
Hapoel Holon	Holon	Holon Toto Hall	5,500	QF (7th)
Hapoel Jerusalem	Jerusalem	Pais Arena	11,000	SF (2nd)
Ironi Nahariya	Nahariya	Ein Sarah	2,000	1st (Ligat Leumit)
Ironi Nes Ziona	Nes Ziona	Lev Hamoshava	1,300	QF (6th)
Maccabi Ashdod	Ashdod	HaKiriya Arena	2,200	12th
Hapoel Eilat B.C.	Eilat	Begin Arena	1,200	SF (5th)
Maccabi Haifa	Haifa	Romema Arena	5,000	Runner-Up (3rd)
Maccabi Rishon LeZion	Rishon LeZion	Beit Maccabi Rishon	2,200	10th
Maccabi Tel Aviv	Tel Aviv	Menora Mivtachim Arena	10,383	Champion (1st)
Hapoel Tel Aviv	Tel Aviv	Drive in Arena	3,504	QF (4th)

=== Head coaches ===
Team	Head coach	Seasons in the club
Bnei Herzliya	(Israel) Mickey Gorka	1
Hapoel Gilboa Galil	(Israel) Ariel Beit-Halahmy	1
Hapoel Holon	(Israel) Elad Hasin	2
Hapoel Jerusalem	(Israel) Danny Franco	1
Ironi Nahariya	(Israel) Roi Hagay	2
Ironi Nes Ziona	(Israel) Nadav Zilberstein	2
Maccabi Ashdod	(Israel) Zvi Sherf	1
Hapoel Eilat	(Israel) Arik Shivek	3
Maccabi Haifa	(Israel) Rami Hadar	2
Maccabi Rishon LeZion	(Israel) Sharon Drucker	1
Maccabi Tel Aviv	(Israel) Guy Goodes	1
Hapoel Tel Aviv	(Israel) Oded Kattash	1

== Regular season ==
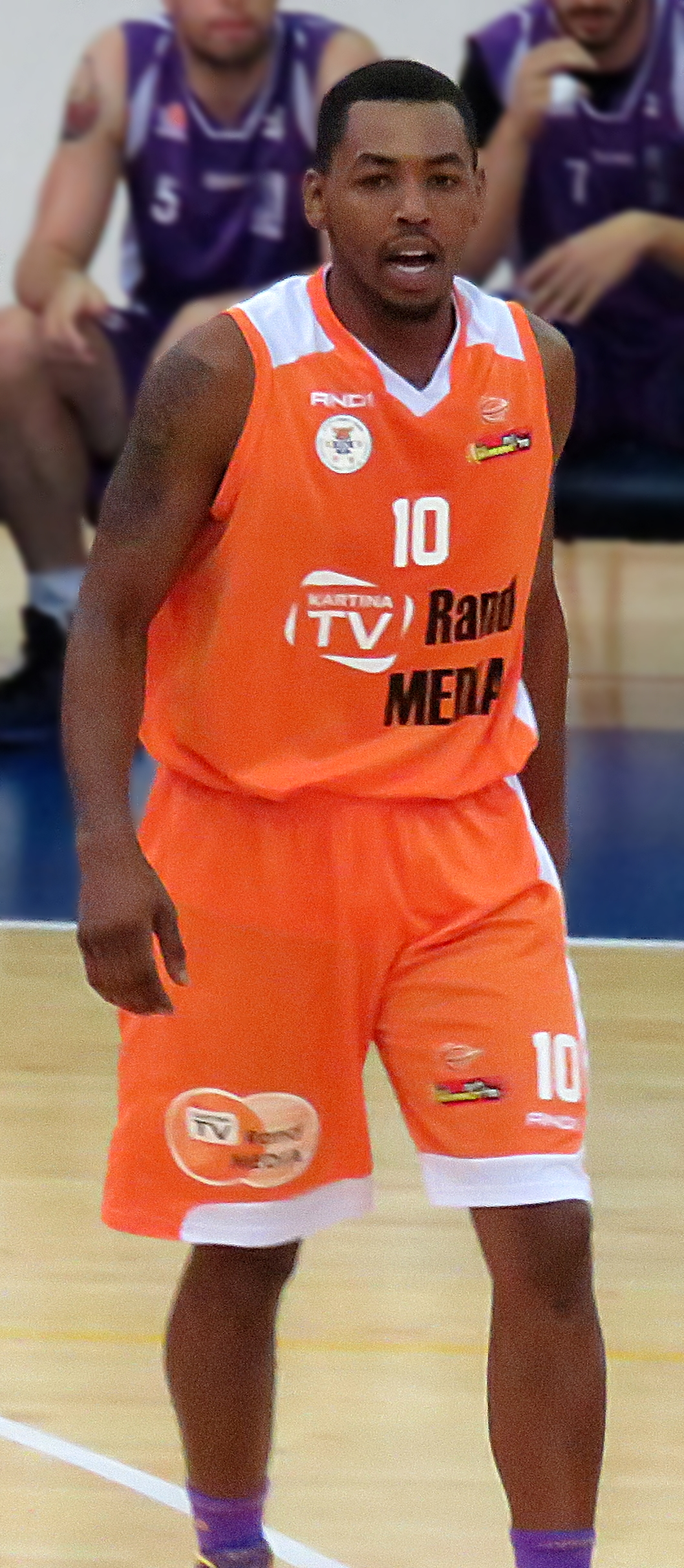
Mark Lyons, The 2014-15 leading scorer

	Team	Pld	W	L	PF	PA	Diff	Pts
1.	Maccabi Tel Aviv	33	27	6	2867	2611	+256	60
2.	Hapoel Jerusalem	33	25	8	2794	2427	+367	58
3.	Hapoel Holon	33	17	16	2675	2669	+6	50
4.	Hapoel Eilat	33	17	16	2718	2708	+10	50
5.	Maccabi Haifa	33	17	16	2655	2668	-13	50
6.	Maccabi Rishon LeZion	33	17	16	2643	2621	+22	50
7.	Hapoel Tel Aviv	33	17	16	2674	2591	+83	50
8.	Ironi Nes Ziona	33	15	18	2647	2705	-58	48
9.	Bnei Herzliya	33	14	19	2826	2850	-24	47
10.	Ironi Nahariya	33	12	21	2634	2855	-221	45
11.	Maccabi Ashdod	33	11	22	2650	2799	-149	44
12.	Hapoel Gilboa Galil	33	9	24	2518	2797	-279	42

Qualification to Quarterfinals
Relegation to the Second Division

Pld – Played; W – Won; L – Lost; PF – Points for; PA – Points against; Diff – Difference; Pts – Points.

== Playoffs ==
=== Bracket ===
Small bold numbers represent the seed earned in the regular season of each team.

Quarterfinals; 16–31 May
**1** Maccabi Tel Aviv	**3**
**8** Ironi Nes Ziona	0
**4** Hapoel Eilat	**3**
**5** Maccabi Haifa	2
**2** Hapoel Jerusalem	**3**
**7** Hapoel Tel Aviv	0
**3** Hapoel Holon	1
**6** Maccabi Rishon LeZion	**3**

Semifinals; 3–18 June
**1** Maccabi Tel Aviv	2
**4** Hapoel Eilat	**3**
**2** Hapoel Jerusalem	**3**
**4** Maccabi Rishon LeZion	0

Finals; 22–25 June
**4** Hapoel Eilat	65	68	133
**2** Hapoel Jerusalem	80	88	**168**

=== Quarterfinals ===
The Quarterfinals are played as The-Best-Of-5 series. The higher ranked team hosts games 1, 3 and 5 (if necessary). The lower ranked team hosts games 2 and 4 (if necessary).

Team #1	Agg.	Team #2	Game 1 16–18 May	Game 2 20–21 May	Game 3 24–25 May	Game 4 27–28 May	Game 5 30–31 May
**Maccabi Tel Aviv** (1)	**3**-0	(8) Ironi Nes Ziona	**89**-88	**75**-56	**90**-73		
**Hapoel Jerusalem** (2)	**3**-0	(7) Hapoel Tel Aviv	**75**-67	**98**-83	**77**-73 (OT)		
Hapoel Holon (3)	1-**3**	(6) **Maccabi Rishon LeZion**	76-**80** (OT)	73-**79**	**83**-64	81-**93**	
**Hapoel Eilat** (4)	**3**-2	(5) Maccabi Haifa	**95**-74	68-**76**	**85**-79	62-**69**	**85**-75

=== Semifinals ===
The Semifinals are played The-Best-Of-5 series. The higher ranked team hosts games 1, 3 and 5 (if necessary). The lower ranked team hosts games 2 and 4 (if necessary).

Team #1	Agg.	Team #2	Game 1 3–4 June	Game 2 7–8 June	Game 3 10–11 June	Game 4 14–15 June	Game 5 17–18 June
Maccabi Tel Aviv (1)	2-**3**	(4) **Hapoel Eilat**	**91**-82	**86**-64	98-**104** (OT)	79-**92**	76-**79**
**Hapoel Jerusalem** (2)	**3**-0	(6) Maccabi Rishon LeZion	**81**-73	**76**-75	**90**-74		

=== Finals ===
The Finals series is played in a home-and-away format, with the overall cumulative score determining the champion. Thus, the score of one single game can be tied. The team who finishes at a higher place in the regular season will host the second game.

Team #1	Agg.	Team #2	Game 1 22 June	Game 2 25 June
Hapoel Eilat (4)	133-**168**	**(2) Hapoel Jerusalem**	65-**80**	68-**88**

==== Game 1 ====
22 June 2015
21:00

Box score

Hapoel Eilat	65–**80**	**Hapoel Jerusalem**
Scoring by quarter: 22-**25**, 14-**19**, 16-**20**, 13-**16**
Pts: Uter 16; Rebs: Uter, Kadir 8 Asts: Nissim 7		Pts: Wright 18; Rebs: Thompson 7 Asts: Eliyahu 7

Begin Arena
Attendance: 1,300

==== Game 2 ====
25 June 2015
21:00

Box score

**Hapoel Jerusalem**	**88**–68	Hapoel Eilat
Scoring by quarter: 20-**26**, 16-**18**, **27**-10, **25**-14
Pts: Smith, Wright 20; Rebs: Smith 10; Asts: Smith, Eliyahu 6		Pts: Uter 17; Rebs: Uter 11; Asts: Berkowitz 5

Pais Arena, Jerusalem
Attendance: 11,000

2015 Israeli Basketball Super League Champions

**Hapoel Jerusalem**
**1st title**

== All-Star Game ==
The 2015 Israeli League All-star event was held on 3 March 2015, at the new Holon Toto Hall in Holon. Every team sent one foreigner and one Israeli for the respective team, with the remaining spots been selected by the League. Maccabi Tel Aviv have been abroad for a Euroleague game, therefore their players did not compete in the event.

Israeli All-Stars
Pos	Player	Team
Starters
G	(Israel) Meir Tapiro	Ironi Nes Ziona
G	(Israel) Yotam Halperin	Hapoel Jerusalem
F	(Israel) Shawn Dawson	Maccabi Rishon LeZion
F	(Israel) Lior Eliyahu	Hapoel Jerusalem
C	(Israel) Elishay Kadir	Hapoel Eilat
Reserves
G	(Israel) Shlomi Harush	Hapoel Holon
G	(Israel) Raviv Limonad	Hapoel Tel Aviv
G	(Israel) Yuval Naimi	Bnei Herzliya
G	(Israel) (Denmark) Chanan Colman	Maccabi Haifa
F	(Israel) Itay Segev	Hapoel Gilboa Galil
C	(Israel) (Bosnia and Herzegovina) Robert Rothbart	Ironi Nahariya
C	(Israel) Isaac Rosefelt	Hapoel Holon
Head coach: Elad Hasin (Hapoel Holon)
Head coach: Sharon Drucker (Maccabi Rishon LeZion)

International All-Stars
Pos	Player	Team
Starters
G	(United States) Jordan Taylor	Hapoel Holon
G	(United States) Isaiah Swann	Maccabi Rishon LeZion
F	(United States) (Venezuela) Donta Smith	Hapoel Jerusalem
F	(United States) Yancy Gates	Hapoel Tel Aviv
C	(United States) Craig Smith	Ironi Nes Ziona
Reserves
G	(United States) Mark Lyons	Ironi Nahariya
G	(United States) Josh Selby	Bnei Herzliya
G	(United States) Alex Young	Hapoel Gilboa Galil
G	(United States) Bracey Wright	Hapoel Jerusalem
F	(United States) Tony Crocker	Hapoel Holon
F	(United States) René Rougeau	Maccabi Haifa
C	(United States) Curtis Kelly	Maccabi Ashdod
C	(United States) (Jamaica) Adrian Uter	Hapoel Eilat
Head coach:Danny Franco (Hapoel Jerusalem)
Head coach:Oded Kattash (Hapoel Tel Aviv)

3 March

Israeli All-Stars	122–121 (OT)	International All-Stars
Scoring by quarter: 30–30, 29–43, 36–19, 23–26, Overtime: 4–3
Pts: Rothbart 26; Rebs: Rothbart 8 Asts: Lior Eliyahu 7		Pts: Selby 23; Asts: Selby 11

=== Three-point shootout ===
Contestants
Pos.	Player	Team	First round	Final round
G	(Israel) (United States) Zack Rosen (W)	Maccabi Ashdod	20	19
G	(Israel) (Denmark) Chanan Colman	Maccabi Haifa	19	14
C	(Israel) (Bosnia and Herzegovina) Robert Rothbart	Ironi Nahariya	14	-
G	(Israel) Yehu Orland	Maccabi Ashdod	14	-
G	(Israel) Yuval Naimi	Bnei Herzliya	13	-
G	(Israel) Yotam Halperin	Hapoel Jerusalem	9	-
G	(United States) Tony Crocker	Hapoel Holon	8	-

=== Slam Dunk Contest ===
Contestants
Pos.	Player	Team
G	(United States) Mark Lyons (W)	Ironi Nahariya
F	(United States Virgin Islands) (Puerto Rico) Ivan Aska	Maccabi Ashdod
F	(Israel) Itay Segev	Hapoel Gilboa Galil
F	(Israel) Netanel Artzi	Maccabi Haifa

== Awards ==
=== Regular season MVP ===
- (Israel) Lior Eliyahu (Hapoel Jerusalem)

=== All-BSL 1st team ===
- (United States) Khalif Wyatt (Hapoel Eilat)
- (Israel) Shawn Dawson (Maccabi Rishon LeZion)
- (United States) Devin Smith (Maccabi Tel Aviv)
- (Israel) Lior Eliyahu (Hapoel Jerusalem)
- (United States) Ike Ofoegbu (Maccabi Haifa)

=== Coach of the Season ===
- (Israel) Danny Franco

=== Rising Star ===
- (Israel) Shawn Dawson (Maccabi Rishon LeZion)

=== Best Defender ===
- (United States) Brian Randle (Maccabi Tel Aviv)

=== Most Improved Player ===
- (Israel) Robert Rothbart (Ironi Nahariya)

=== Sixth Man of the Season ===
- (United States) Tony Gaffney (Hapoel Jerusalem)
