= 2015–16 Israeli Basketball Super League =

Basketball tournament

Israeli Basketball Super League
- Season: 2015–2016
- Duration: October 11, 2015 – June 9, 2016
- Games played: 363 (regular season)
- Teams: 12
- TV partners: Sports Channel; Channel 1

Regular season
- Season MVP: (United States) Darryl Monroe
- Relegated: Ironi Nes Ziona

Finals
- Champions: Maccabi Rishon LeZion (1st title)
- Runners-up: Hapoel Jerusalem
- Final Four MVP: (United States) Darryl Monroe

Statistical leaders
Points	(United States) Will Clyburn	20.9
Rebounds	(Nigeria) Alade Aminu	9.9
Assists	(Israel) Gal Mekel	7.4
Index Rating	(United States) Darryl Monroe	24.2

Records
- Biggest home win: 40-Maccabi Tel Aviv B.C.
- Highest scoring: 116-Maccabi Tel Aviv B.C.
- Winning streak: 12-Hapoel Jerusalem B.C.
- Average attendance: 2,372
- ^1 Sponsored league name, referring to Winner.

Israeli basketball in 2015–16
League (Final Four)	State Cup	League Cup

The 2015–2016 Israeli Basketball Super League was the 62nd season of the Israeli Basketball Super League. The regular season started on October 11, 2015, and ended on March 6, 2016. The last game was played on June 9, 2016.

This season, the league had a different format. After the eight best teams qualified for the Playoffs, the winners of the series would play in a Final Four tournament.

Hapoel Jerusalem was the defending champion. Hapoel failed to reclaim its title, because Maccabi Rishon LeZion won in the Final. It was the first championship ever for Rishon LeZion.

== Teams ==
Teams 2015–16

Maccabi Kiryat Gat has been promoted to the league after winning 2014–15 National League. Hapoel Gilboa Galil, who finished last season, relegated from the Super League.

=== Stadia and locations ===
Team	Home city	Stadium	Capacity
Bnei Herzliya	Herzliya	HaYovel Herzliya	1,500
Maccabi Kiryat Gat	Kiryat Gat	Ashkelon Sports Arena	3,000
Hapoel Holon	Holon	Holon Toto Hall	5,500
Hapoel Jerusalem	Jerusalem	Pais Arena	11,000
Ironi Nahariya	Nahariya	Ein Sarah	2,000
Ironi Nes Ziona	Nes Ziona	Lev Hamoshava	1,300
Maccabi Ashdod	Ashdod	HaKiriya Arena	2,200
Hapoel Eilat	Eilat	Begin Arena	1,690
Maccabi Haifa	Haifa	Romema Arena	5,000
Maccabi Rishon LeZion	Rishon LeZion	Beit Maccabi Rishon	2,200
Maccabi Tel Aviv	Tel Aviv	Menora Mivtachim Arena	10,383
Hapoel Tel Aviv	Tel Aviv	Drive in Arena	3,504

== Regular season ==
Pos	Team	Pld	W	L	PF	PA	PD	Qualification or relegation
1	Hapoel Jerusalem	33	27	6	2886	2572	+314	Advance to Playoffs
2	Maccabi Tel Aviv	33	24	9	2826	2521	+305	Advance to Playoffs
3	Maccabi Haifa	33	19	14	2565	2482	+83	Advance to Playoffs
4	Ironi Nahariya	33	18	15	2547	2611	−64	Advance to Playoffs
5	Hapoel Eilat	33	17	16	2636	2677	−41	Advance to Playoffs
6	Maccabi Rishon LeZion	33	16	17	2659	2644	+15	Advance to Playoffs
7	Bnei Herzliya	33	15	18	2690	2733	−43	Advance to Playoffs
8	Hapoel Tel Aviv	33	15	18	2698	2678	+20	Advance to Playoffs
9	Maccabi Ashdod	33	14	19	2719	2813	−94	
10	Hapoel Holon	33	12	21	2567	2715	−148	
11	Maccabi Kiryat Gat	33	11	22	2627	2785	−158	
12	Ironi Nes Ziona	33	10	23	2591	2780	−189	Relegation to Liga Leumit

Source: Basket.co.il

== Playoffs ==
=== Quarterfinals ===
The Quarterfinals were played as best-of-five playoff series. The higher ranked team hosted games 1, 3 and 5 (if necessary). The lower ranked team hosted games 2 and 4 (if necessary). The Quarterfinals started on May 19 and ended on June 1.

Team 1	Series	Team 2	Game 1	Game 2	Game 3	Game 4	Game 5
Hapoel Jerusalem	3–2	Hapoel Tel Aviv	99–97	85–87	90–73	84–93	86–84
Maccabi Tel Aviv	3–0	Bnei Herzliya	76–75	68–51	81–54	–	–
Maccabi Haifa	2–3	Maccabi Rishon LeZion	69–71	71–89	83–66	75–65	60–70
Ironi Nahariya	0–3	Hapoel Eilat	75–82	77–80	85–86	–	–

== Final four ==
Semi-finals; 6 June
Hapoel Jerusalem	82
Hapoel Eilat	78
Maccabi Tel Aviv	69
Maccabi Rishon LeZion	71

Final; 9 June
Hapoel Jerusalem	77
Maccabi Rishon LeZion	83

== Final standings ==
Pos	Team	Qualification or relegation
1	Maccabi Rishon LeZion	Qualified for 2016–17 Champions League Regular season
2	Hapoel Jerusalem	Wild card for 2016–17 Eurocup Basketball
3	Maccabi Tel Aviv	Automatically qualified for 2016–17 Euroleague
4	Hapoel Eilat	
5	Maccabi Haifa	
6	Ironi Nahariya	Qualification for the Champions League First qualifying round
7	Bnei Herzliya	Qualification for the FIBA Europe Cup
8	Hapoel Tel Aviv	
9	Maccabi Ashdod	
10	Hapoel Holon	
11	Maccabi Kiryat Gat	
12	Ironi Nes Ziona	Relegated to the Ligat Leumit

== Statistical leaders ==
As of 22 April 2016.

=== Efficiency ===
Pos	Player	Club	PIR
1	(United States) Darryl Monroe	Maccabi Rishon LeZion	25.0
2	(United States) Paul Delaney	Maccabi Kiryat Gat	23.5
3	(Nigeria) Alade Aminu	Hapoel Eilat	22.6

=== Points ===
Pos	Player	Club	PPG
1	(United States) Will Clyburn	Hapoel Holon	20.4
2	(United States) Charles Thomas	Maccabi Ashdod	20.4
3	(United States) Diante Garrett	Maccabi Ashdod	18.8

=== Rebounds ===
Pos	Player	Club	RPG
1	(Nigeria) Alade Aminu	Hapoel Eilat	9.9
2	(United States) Richard Howell	Ironi Nahariya	9.6
3	(United States) Darryl Monroe	Maccabi Rishon LeZion	8.8

=== Assists ===
Pos	Player	Club	APG
1	(Israel) Niv Berkowitz	Ironi Nahariya	6.7
2	(Venezuela) Gregory Vargas	Hapoel Haifa	6.6
3	(United States) Diante Garrett	Maccabi Ashdod	6.0

=== Season highs ===
Category		Player	Club
Points	46	(United States) Nate Robinson	Hapoel Tel Aviv
Rebounds	20	(United States) Richard Howell	Ironi Nahariya
Assists	16	(Israel) Gal Mekel	Maccabi Tel Aviv
Blocks	6	5 occasions	
Steals	7	(United States) Paul Delaney (2 times)	Maccabi Kiryat Gat

Source: RealGM

== All-Star Game ==
The 2016 Israeli League All-star event was held on 25 March 2016, at the Begin Arena in Eilat.

Israeli All-Stars
Pos	Player	Team
Starters
G	(Israel) Gal Mekel	Maccabi Tel Aviv
G	(Israel) Meir Tapiro	Maccabi Kiryat Gat
F	(Israel) Shawn Dawson	Maccabi Rishon LeZion
F	(Israel) Oz Blayzer	Maccabi Haifa
C	(Israel) Elishay Kadir	Hapoel Eilat
Reserves
G	(Israel) Niv Berkowitz	Ironi Nahariya
G	(Israel) Yuval Naimi	Ironi Nes Ziona
G	(Israel) Aviram Zelekovits	Bnei Herzliya
G	(Israel) Raviv Limonad	Hapoel Tel Aviv
G	(Israel) Afik Nissim	Hapoel Eilat
F	(Israel) Amit Simhon	Hapoel Eilat
F	(Israel) Karam Mashour	Bnei Herzliya
F	(Israel) (Sweden) Jonathan Skjöldebrand	Maccabi Ashdod
F	(Israel) Lior Eliyahu	Hapoel Jerusalem
C	(Israel) (United States) Isaac Rosefelt	Hapoel Holon
Head coach: (Israel) Danny Franco (Hapoel Jerusalem)
Head coach: (Israel) Rami Hadar (Maccabi Haifa)

International All-Stars
Pos	Player	Team
Starters
G	(Venezuela) Gregory Vargas	Maccabi Haifa
G	(United States) Khalif Wyatt	Hapoel Eilat
F	(United States) Will Graves	Maccabi Haifa
F	(United States) (Venezuela) Donta Smith	Hapoel Jerusalem
C	(United States) Darryl Monroe	Maccabi Rishon LeZion
Reserves
G	(United States) Isaiah Swann	Maccabi Ashdod
G	(United States) Diante Garrett	Maccabi Ashdod
G	(United States) (Nigeria) Michael Umeh	Ironi Nahariya
G	(United States) Sundiata Gaines	Ironi Nes Ziona
F	(United States) Gilbert Brown	Ironi Nahariya
F	(United States) Drew Crawford	Bnei Herzliya
F	(United States) Will Clyburn	Hapoel Holon
F	(United States) John Williamson	Hapoel Tel Aviv
F	(Croatia) Dragan Bender	Maccabi Tel Aviv
C	(United States) Marco Killingsworth	Maccabi Kiryat Gat
C	(United States) (Nigeria) Alade Aminu	Hapoel Eilat
Head coach: (Croatia) Žan Tabak (Maccabi Tel Aviv)
Head coach: (Israel) Mickey Gorka (Bnei Herzliya)

25 March

Israeli All-Stars	143–118	International All-Stars
Scoring by quarter: 41–25, 39–34, 24–35, 39–24
Pts: Kadir 21; Rebs: Kadir 9 Asts: Berkovitz 8		Pts: Garrett 18; Rebs: Garrett 8 Asts: Garrett 5

Begin Arena, Eilat
Attendance: 1,690

=== Three-point shootout ===
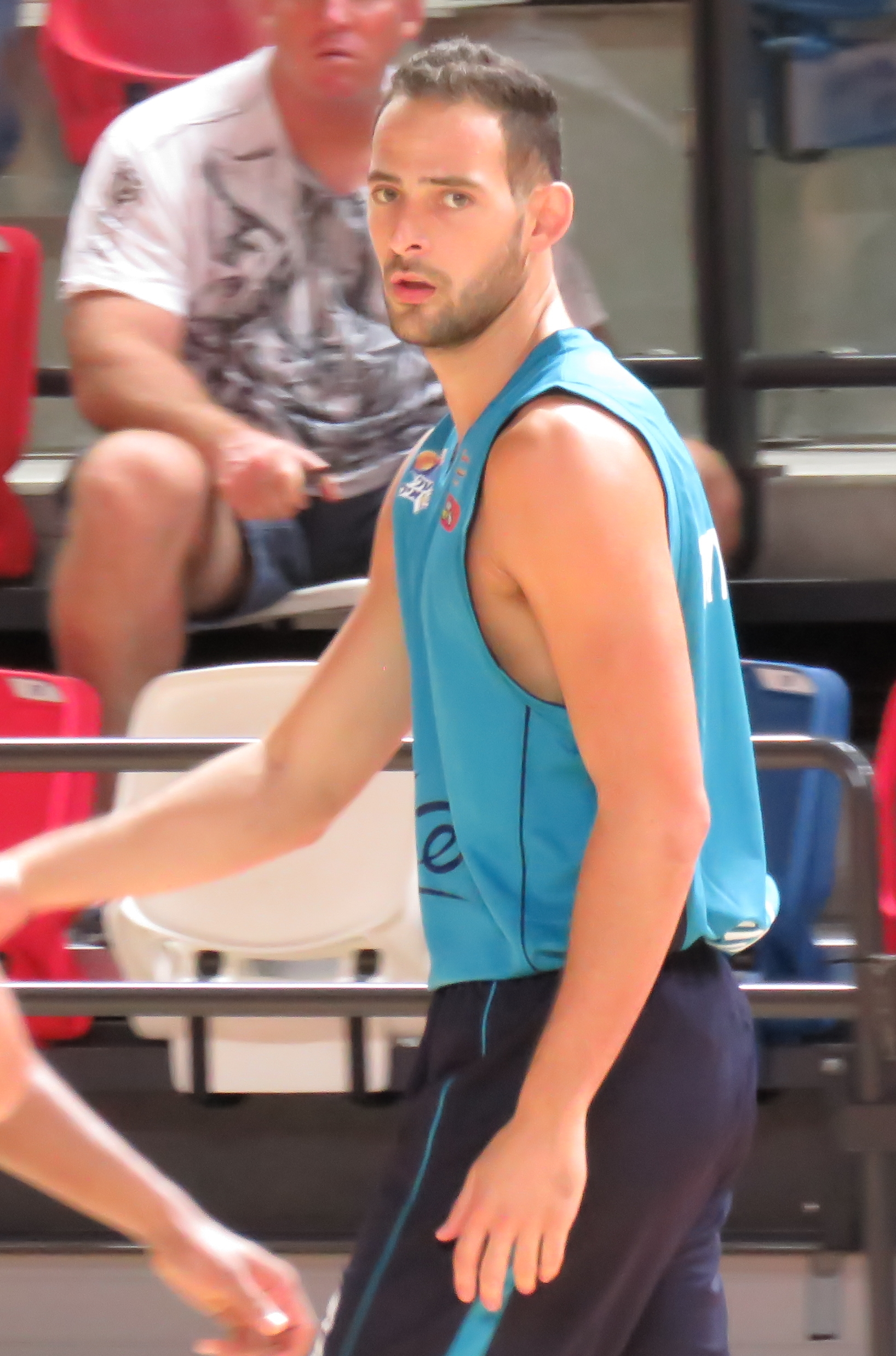
Amit Simhon

Contestants
Pos.	Player	Team	First round	Final round
G	(United States) Isaiah Swann (W)	Maccabi Haifa	21	16
F	(Israel) Guy Pnini	Maccabi Tel Aviv	22	14
G	(Israel) Amit Simhon	Hapoel Eilat	19	-
G	(United States) (Nigeria) Michael Umeh	Ironi Nahariya	19	-
G	(Israel) Aviram Zelekovits	Bnei Herzliya	16	-
G	(Israel) Yotam Halperin	Hapoel Jerusalem	14	-
G	(Israel) Afik Nissim	Hapoel Eilat	13	-
G	(Israel) Yuval Naimi	Ironi Nes Ziona	9	-

=== Slam Dunk Contest ===
Contestants
Pos.	Player	Team	First round	Second round	Final round
F	(United States) Gilbert Brown (W)	Ironi Nahariya	50	45	46
F	(United States) John Williamson	Hapoel Tel Aviv	50	45	45
F	(Israel) Karam Mashour	Bnei Herzliya	50	42	-
C	(United States) (Nigeria) Alade Aminu	Hapoel Eilat	44	42	-
G	(United States) Diante Garrett	Maccabi Ashdod	41	47	-

== Awards ==
=== Regular season MVP ===
- (United States) Darryl Monroe (Maccabi Rishon LeZion)

=== All-BSL 1st team ===
- (Israel) Gal Mekel (Maccabi Tel Aviv)
- (United States) Khalif Wyatt (Hapoel Eilat)
- (United States) (Venezuela) Donta Smith (Hapoel Jerusalem)
- (Israel) Lior Eliyahu (Hapoel Jerusalem)
- (United States) Darryl Monroe (Maccabi Rishon LeZion)

=== All-BSL 2nd team ===
- (Venezuela) Gregory Vargas (Maccabi Haifa)
- (Israel) Raviv Limonad (Hapoel Tel Aviv)
- (Israel) Shawn Dawson (Maccabi Rishon LeZion)
- (United States) Will Clyburn (Hapoel Holon)
- (United States) Richard Howell (Ironi Nahariya)

=== Coach of the Season ===
- (Israel) Arik Shivek (Maccabi Rishon LeZion)

=== Rising Star ===
- (Israel) Karam Mashour (Bnei Herzliya)

=== Best Defender ===
- (Venezuela) Gregory Vargas (Maccabi Haifa)

=== Most Improved Player ===
- (Israel) Itay Segev (Maccabi Tel Aviv)

=== Sixth Man of the Season ===
- (Israel) Bar Timor (Hapoel Jerusalem)
