= Khalif Wyatt =

American basketball player (born 1991)

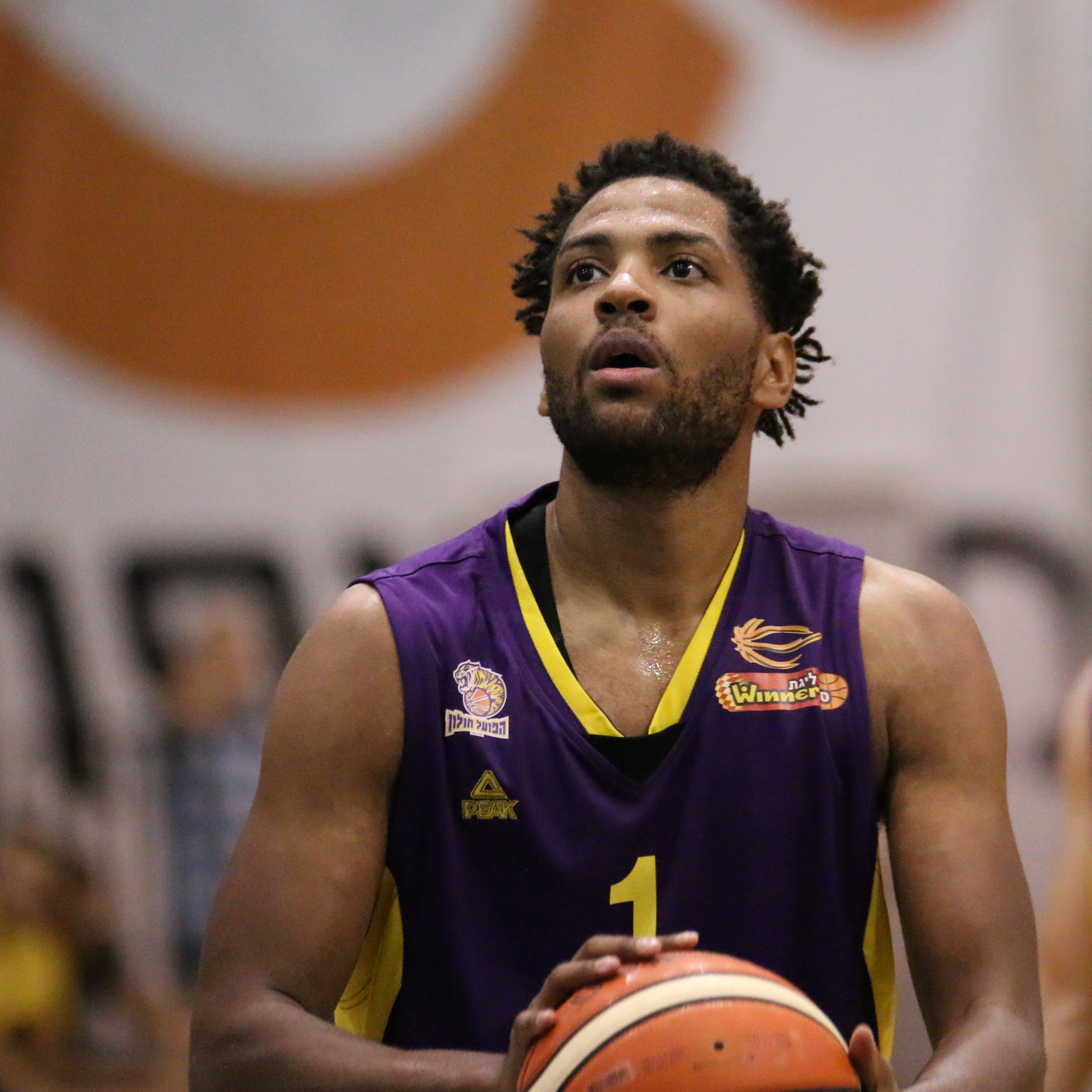
- Wyatt with Hapoel Holon in 2016

Long Island Nets
- Title: Assistant coach
- Conference: NBA G League

Personal information
- Born: June 10, 1991 (age 35) Norristown, Pennsylvania, U.S.
- Listed height: 6 ft 4 in (1.93 m)
- Listed weight: 205 lb (93 kg)

Career information
- High school: Norristown (Norristown, Pennsylvania)
- College: Temple (2009–2013)
- NBA draft: 2013: undrafted
- Playing career: 2013–2022
- Position: Point guard / shooting guard
- Number: 4, 1
- Coaching career: 2022–present

Career history

Playing
- 2013–2014: Guangdong Southern Tigers
- 2014: Springfield Armor
- 2014–2016: Hapoel Eilat
- 2016–2017: Hapoel Holon
- 2018: Ironi Nes Ziona
- 2018: Hapoel Holon
- 2019–2020: San Miguel Alab Pilipinas
- 2020: Champagne Châlons-Reims
- 2021–2022: SCM U Craiova

Coaching
- 2022–2023: West Chester (assistant)
- 2026–present: Long Island Nets (assistant)

Career highlights
- 2× All-Israeli League First Team (2015, 2016); 2× Israeli League All-Star (2016, 2018); Atlantic 10 Player of the Year (2013); First-team All-Atlantic 10 (2013); Second-team All-Atlantic 10 (2012); Atlantic 10 Sixth Man of the Year (2011)
- Stats at Basketball Reference

Khalif Wyatt (born June 10, 1991) is an American professional basketball coach for the NBA G League's Long Island Nets. He was formerly a professional player from 2013 to 2022. In college, Wyatt was the Atlantic 10 Conference Player of the Year as a senior in the 2012–13 season, after leading the Owls to the Round of 32 in the 2013 NCAA tournament. Wyatt led Temple in scoring in his final college season with a 20.5 points per game average. In July 2023 he joined Temple men's basketball's staff as the program's first Director of Player Development after a nine-year professional playing career.

== High school ==
Wyatt attended Norristown Area High School in Norristown, Pennsylvania from 2005–06 to 2008–09. In his junior season he averaged 18.0 points while guiding them to a 33–2 record. Norristown lost the state championship game to powerhouse Chester High School, which also featured future Temple teammate Rahlir Jefferson. The next year, Wyatt's senior season, he averaged 20 points, four rebounds and four assists while leading Norristown to the PIAA Class AAAA District championship. He earned Second Team All-State accolades for the second year in a row as well.

== College career ==
Wyatt played in 10 games during his freshman campaign in 2009–10 in which Temple won both the Atlantic 10 Conference (A-10) regular season and conference tournament titles. In Wyatt's sophomore season, he averaged 10.1 points and 1.3 steals per game and was named the A-10's Sixth Man of the Year. In 2011–12, his junior season, the Temple Owls won the A-10 regular season title for the second time in three years. Wyatt was second on the team in scoring with a 17.1 points per game average that also ranked fourth in the conference. Despite the success, the Owls entered the 2012 NCAA tournament as a 5-seed but were upset in the Round of 64 by 12-seed South Florida. Wyatt earned Second Team All-Conference honors, however.

In his final season, Temple finished in a three-way tie for third place in the A-10. Wyatt led the team in scoring with 20.5 points per game; he also averaged 2.9 rebounds, 4.0 assists and 1.7 steals. Despite losing in the first round of the A-10 tournament, the Owls had finished the regular season with a 23–8 overall record and were invited to participate in the 2013 NCAA tournament via an at-large bid. The 9th-seeded Owls then defeated 8th-seeded NC State behind Wyatt's 31 points to advance to the Round of 32. In their next match-up, they took on #1-seed Indiana who had national player of the year candidate Cody Zeller in their line-up. Temple battled them toe-to-toe, and Wyatt was so effective against them that Indiana coach Tom Crean employed a special defensive tactic, called a full-court face-guard, against him (whereby an opposing player's primary responsibility for that game is to follow that player around all over the court to prevent him from even catching the ball). The Owls were just several possessions away including one big-time three-point shot by Victor Oladipo away from upsetting one of the best teams in the country. Wyatt still managed to score 31 points in the loss. Tom Crean said in his post-game conference that Wyatt was the best player that Indiana had played all season and that Temple was the toughest team they had also faced. Khalif Wyatt was named an A-10 First Team All-Conference selection as well as the A-10 Player of the Year, becoming Temple's 10th overall recipient of that award. On April 15, 2013, Wyatt was named the Philadelphia Big 5 Player of the Year, awarded annually to the player who performs the best throughout Philadelphia "Big 5" inner-city games among the five member schools that season.

=== Relationship with Fran Dunphy ===
He and head coach Fran Dunphy did not see eye-to-eye and frequently got into arguments early throughout Wyatt's career. Dunphy said that Wyatt "was killing [him] with high maintenance" and how "In the beginning, he had his way of doing things and I had mine." Wyatt would be late to meetings, doctors' appointments and practices, his defense was considered at times lazy and undisciplined, and he would make "head-scratching" plays more frequently than a coach would like. As Wyatt's tenure with Temple lengthened, he and Dunphy's relationship grew, and by the time he was a senior in 2012–13 there was great mutual respect for one another. In March 2013, after Wyatt's career had concluded, he said, "Coming in here as a 17-year-old, you think you know everything. You think you have the answers to everything. Coach Dunphy helped me grow up a lot. He really was like a father to me for four years. He pretty much raised me from 17 to 22. I'm happy I had him in my life. Through everything, he's stuck with me. He had my best interests at heart."

== Professional career ==
=== Guangdong Southern Tigers (2013–2014) ===
After going undrafted in the 2013 NBA draft, Wyatt was chosen to participate for his hometown Philadelphia 76ers in the 2013 NBA Summer League. On September 27, 2013, Wyatt signed with the Philadelphia 76ers. He was later waived by the 76ers on October 25.

On October 28, 2013, Wyatt signed with the Chinese team Guangdong Southern Tigers. In January 2014, he left China.

=== Springfield Armor (2014) ===
On February 13, 2014, he was acquired by the Reno Bighorns of the NBA Development League. Four days later, he was traded to the Springfield Armor. In Wyatt's debut with the Armor, he scored 19 points in a 108–117 loss to the Fort Wayne Mad Ants.

=== Hapoel Eilat (2014–2016) ===
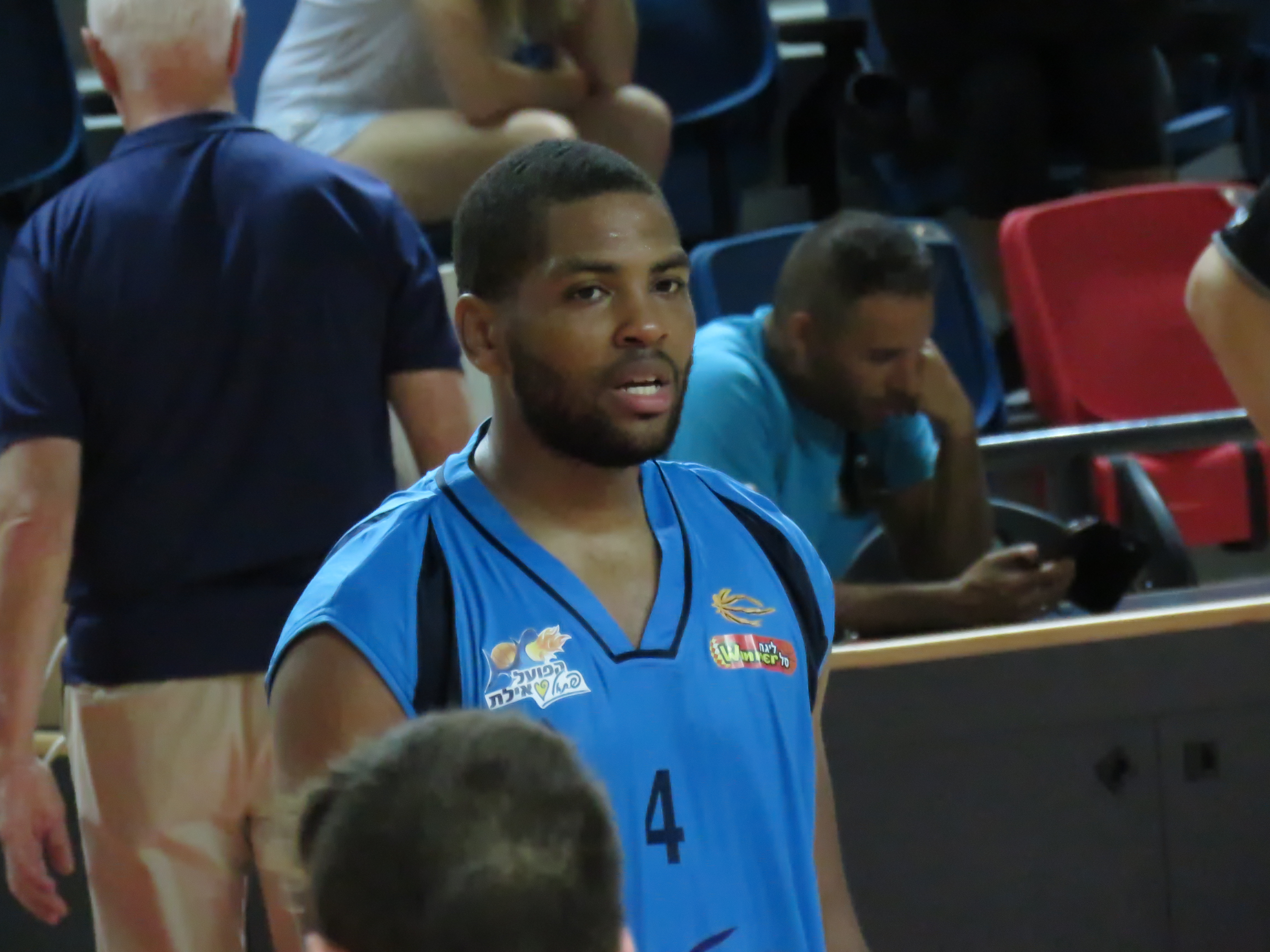
Wyatt with Hapoel Eilat in September 2015

On July 17, 2014, Wyatt signed a two-year deal with the Israeli team Hapoel Eilat. In his first season with Eilat, he averaged 14.2 points, 3.8 assists and 2.2 rebounds per game. Wyatt led Eilat to the 2015 Israeli League Finals, where they eventually lost to Hapoel Jerusalem. On June 19, 2015, Wyatt earned a spot in the All-Israeli League First Team.

On March 7, 2016, Wyatt recorded a then career-high 33 points, shooting 9-of-12 from 3-point range in an 85–76 win over Ironi Nes Ziona. Wyatt led Eilat to the 2016 Israeli League Final Four, where they lost to Hapoel Jerusalem. On June 3, 2016, Wyatt earned a spot in the All-Israeli League First Team for two years in a row.

=== Hapoel Holon (2016–2017) ===
On August 2, 2016, Wyatt signed with Hapoel Holon for the 2016–17 season, joining his former head coach Dan Shamir. On January 1, 2017, Wyatt was named Israeli League Player of the Month for games played in December. On February 4, 2017, Wyatt suffered a knee injury in a match against Maccabi Rishon LeZion and later was ruled out for the rest of the season.

=== Ironi Nes Ziona (2018) ===
On January 9, 2018, Wyatt signed with Ironi Nes Ziona for a one-month temporary contract with an option to extend it for the rest of the season. On February 5, 2018, his second game with Nes Ziona, Wyatt recorded a season-high 25 points, along with 4 assists in an 81–84 loss to Maccabi Ashdod. On March 4, 2018, Wyatt recorded 23 points, shooting 6-for-7 from three-point range, along with 4 assists and led Nes Ziona to an 85–76 win over Maccabi Tel Aviv. He was subsequently named Israeli League Round 18 MVP. Wyatt led Nes Ziona to the 2018 Israeli League Playoffs, where they eventually lost to Maccabi Tel Aviv.

=== Return to Holon (2018) ===
On July 7, 2018, Wyatt returned to Hapoel Holon for a second stint, signing a one-year deal. On October 17, 2018, Wyatt recorded a career-high 35 points, shooting 8-of-16 from 3-point range, along with five rebounds and five assists in a 104–111 overtime loss to Reyer Venezia. In December 2018, his knee problems ruled him out again, until the end of the season.

=== San Miguel Alab Pilipinas (2019–2020) ===
On October 23, 2019, Wyatt signed a three-month contract with Philippines-based San Miguel Alab Pilipinas of the pan-ASEAN Basketball League (ABL) as one of its three import players. He appeared in eight games for the Alab Pilipinas, averaging 16.3 points, 3.8 rebounds and 4.7 assists per game. On January 16, 2020, Wyatt parted ways with the team.

=== Châlons-Reims (2020) ===
On January 30, 2020, Wyatt signed with Champagne Châlons-Reims of the French LNB Pro A.

== The Basketball Tournament ==
Khalif Wyatt played for Team Sons of Westwood in the 2018 edition of The Basketball Tournament. In three games, he averaged 7.0 points per game and 2.0 assists per game. Team Sons of Westwood ALS made it to the Super 16 before falling to Team Challenge ALS.

== Coaching career ==
Shortly after retiring from his professional playing career in 2022, Wyatt joined the West Chester University men's basketball program as an assistant coach. He spent one season with the Golden Rams before joining his alma mater's staff, Temple University, as the program's first Director of Player Development. Wyatt spent two seasons in that role, and in 2025 he became the video coordinator for the NBA G League's Long Island Nets. He was promoted one year later to a full assistant coach starting in 2026–27.

== Career statistics ==
Legend
GP	Games played	MPG	Minutes per game	FG%	Field goal percentage
3P%	3-point field goal percentage	FT%	Free throw percentage	RPG	Rebounds per game
APG	Assists per game	SPG	Steals per game	BPG	Blocks per game
PPG	Points per game	**Bold**	Career high		Led the league

=== Domestic Leagues ===
Year	Team	League	GP	MPG	FG%	3P%	FT%	RPG	APG	SPG	BPG	PPG
2013–14	(China) Guangdong	CBA	28	26.3	.450	.358	.763	2.3	4.9	1.3	.1	14.6
2014	(United States) Springfield Armor	NBDL	20	28.5	.447	.412	.812	2.4	3.5	**1.6**	0	16.2
2014–15	(Israel) Hapoel Eilat	IPL	**44**	27.3	.400	.329	.826	2.2	3.8	1.0	.1	14.2
2015–16	(Israel) Hapoel Eilat	IPL	37	28.7	.424	.342	.874	2.6	4.4	1.4	.1	15.0
2016–17	(Israel) Hapoel Holon	IPL	18	**30.9**	.407	.300	.812	2.5	4.0	1.2	.1	**18.7**
2017–18	(Israel) Ironi Nes Ziona	IPL	23	27.4	.424	.426	.707	1.7	3.6	1.1	**.2**	14.1
2018–19	(Israel) Hapoel Holon	IPL	10	26.7	.354	.333	.820	1.8	**5.6**	1.3	.0	12.7
2019–20	(Philippines) Alab Pilipinas	ABL	8	29.3	**.460**	**.470**	**.910**	**3.8**	4.7	.7	.1	16.3

Source: RealGM & ASEAN Basketball League
