= Hapoel Ironi Eilat =

- Nickname: "Ha Krishim" (The Sharks)
- Leagues: Israeli Basketball Premier League
- Founded: 1970; 56 years ago
- Arena: Begin Arena
- Capacity: 1,600
- Location: Eilat, Israel
- Team colors: Blue, White
- CEO: Rani Cohen
- President: Tal Pinchas
- Head coach: Oren Aharoni
Home	Away

Hapoel Ironi Eilat (Hebrew: הפועל אילת), is an Israeli professional basketball club. The team plays in the Israeli Basketball Premier League, the top tier of professional basketball in Israel, following their recent promotion from the Liga Leumit at the end of the 2025–26 season. The team represents the far-South region of the country - the Arabah area, and the Red Sea city of Eilat.

== History ==
The team earned promotion to the First Division (known variously as Ligat HaAl, the Super League, or the Israeli Basketball Premier League) for the first time in the 1990–91 season, while being coached by Arik Shivek.

In the 1996–97 season, the team lost to Maccabi Tel Aviv in the playoff semi-finals. The following season, the team reached the finals, in which it lost 0-3 to Maccabi Tel Aviv for the second consecutive year.

In early 2000, the team found itself in serious financial difficulties, which resulted in relegation to the Second Division (Liga Leumit, or the National League). Later the team disbanded, and re-established in the lowest league.

In the 2010–11 season, the team won the Association Cup, the cup of the lower leagues, after beating Maccabi Kiryat Bialik in the final.

In June 2012, the team gained the license of Habik'a B.C. to play in the Israeli Basketball Super League, starting with the 2012–13 season.

In June 2015, the team knocked out Israeli basketball powerhouse Maccabi Tel Aviv in the Israeli Basketball Premier League semi-finals, winning 3–2 in a best-of-five series. The team faced Hapoel Jerusalem in the finals, but lost.

At the end of the 2023–24 season, Hapoel Eilat were relegated to the Liga Leumit.

In August 2024, Hapoel Eilat merged with Maccabi Eilat into a joint team called Hapoel Ironi Eilat.

In the 2025–26 season, Eilat finished with a record of 29–1 in Liga Leumit, earning promotion back to the top division.

== Season by season ==
Season	Tier	League	Pos.	Postseason	State Cup	League Cup	European competitions	
2010–11	3	Liga Artzit	4th	—	—	—	—	
2011–12	3	Liga Artzit	3rd	—	—	—	—	
2012–13	1	Premier League	3rd	Semifinalist	Quarterfinalist	—	—	
2013–14	1	Premier League	5th	Semifinalist	Runners-up	Semifinalist	—	
2014–15	1	Premier League	4th	Runners-up	Semifinalist	Quarterfinalist	—	
2015–16	1	Premier League	4th	Semifinalist	Round of 16	Runners-up	—	
2016–17	1	Premier League	2nd	Quarterfinalist	Round of 16	Quarterfinalist	—	
2017–18	1	Premier League	7th	Quarterfinalist	Quarterfinalist	Quarterfinalist	—	
2018–19	1	Premier League	4th	Semifinalist	Quarterfinalist	Quarterfinalist	—	
2019–20	1	Premier League	10th	—	Round of 16	Quarterfinalist	—	
2020–21	1	Premier League	4th	Semifinalist	Round of 16	Quarterfinalist	Balkan League	RS
2021–22	1	Premier League	9th	—	—	Runners-up	3 Champions League	Qualifying rounds
2021–22	1	Premier League	9th	—	—	Runners-up	4 Europe Cup	Regular season
2022–23	1	Premier League	11th	—	—	Quarterfinalist	—	
2023–24	1	Premier League	13th	—	First round	First round	—	

Source: Eurobasket.com

== Players ==
=== Current roster ===
Note: Flags indicate national team eligibility at FIBA-sanctioned events. Players may hold other non-FIBA nationalities not displayed.

Hapoel Ironi Eilat roster
Players
Coaches

Pos.	No.	Nat.	Name	Ht.	Age
F	1	(United States)	Wheeler, Aaron	2.05 m (6 ft 9 in)	28 – 24 September 1998
PF	2	(South Sudan)	Omot, Nuni	2.04 m (6 ft 8 in)	32 – 3 October 1994
G/F	3	(France) (Israel)	Elinger, Dean	1.86 m (6 ft 1 in)	22 – 10 June 2004
PG	4	(United States)	Crawford, Bryant	1.90 m (6 ft 3 in)	29 – 21 March 1997
G	5	(Israel)	Rosenbaum, Daniel	1.97 m (6 ft 6 in)	29 – 11 February 1997
F	6	(Israel)	Mizrahi, Eliya	1.93 m (6 ft 4 in)	18 – 29 March 2008
F/C	7	(Israel)	Ruina, Miron	2.03 m (6 ft 8 in)	28 – 25 March 1998
SG	8	(Israel)	Ben Moshe, Tzuf	1.94 m (6 ft 4 in)	29 – 31 July 1997
G	10	(United States)	McCullum, Kendale	1.84 m (6 ft 0 in)	30 – 31 May 1996
F/C	11	(United States)	Dickey, James	2.07 m (6 ft 9 in)	29 – 28 November 1996
F/C	12	(United States)	Lieb, Brandon	2.16 m (7 ft 1 in)	24 – 19 April 2002
G	13	(United States)	Hawkins, Javontae	1.96 m (6 ft 5 in)	32 – 13 November 1993
G	15	(Israel)	Pinchas, Sagi	1.85 m (6 ft 1 in)	21 – 9 May 2005
G/F	23	(Israel)	Tal, Eliad	1.95 m (6 ft 5 in)	24 – 14 May 2002
PG	50	(Israel)	Sznajderman, Yuval	1.85 m (6 ft 1 in)	23 – 9 December 2002

Head coach

- (Israel) Oren Aharoni

Assistant coach(es)

- (Israel) Uriya Mizrahi
- (Israel) Adam Kaplan

Legend

- (C) Team captain
- Injured

- Roster
Updated: September 30, 2026

=== Depth chart ===
Pos.	Starting 5	Bench 1	Bench 2
C	James Dickey	Brandon Lieb	Nuni Omot
PF	Aaron Wheeler	Miron Ruina	Eliya Mizrahi
SF	Javontae Hawkins	Eliad Tal	Dean Elinger
SG	Daniel Rosenbaum	Tzuf Ben Moshe	Sagi Pinchas
PG	Bryant Crawford	Yuval Sznajderman	Kendale McCullum

- The Israeli League rule requires every team to have at least one Israeli on the court at any time.
- There should be at least 7 Israelis and up to 5 foreigners on a 12-men game sheet.

Source: basket.co.il

== Honours ==
=== Domestic competitions ===
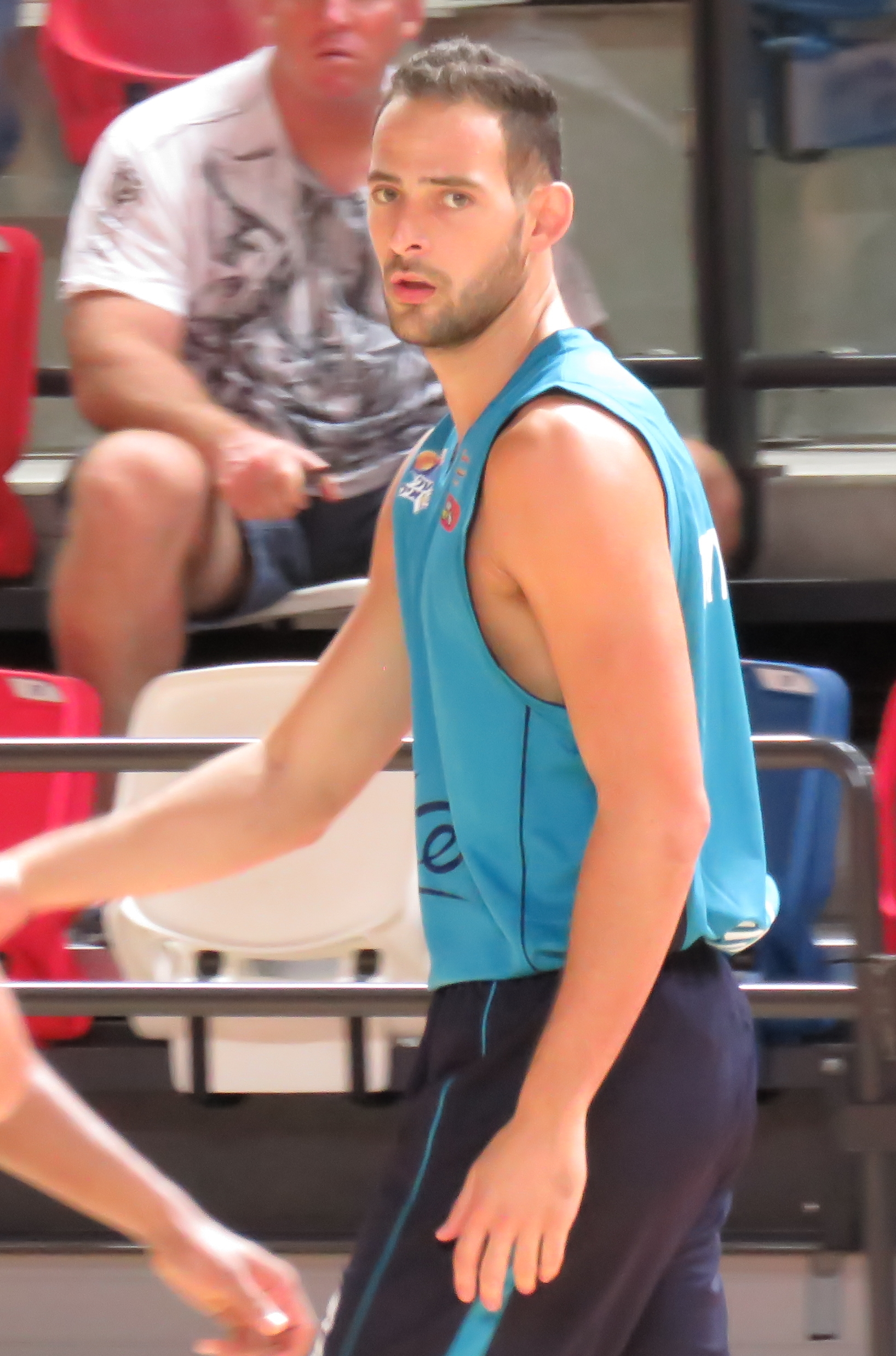
Amit Simhon

- Israeli Championship

Runners-up: 1998, 2015

- State Cup

Runners-up: 2014

- League Cup

Runners-up: 2015, 2021

==== Lower division competitions ====
- Liga Artzit (2nd)

Winners: 1991 (South Division)

- Association Cup

Champions (1): 2011

== Notable players ==
Note: Flags indicate national team eligibility at FIBA-sanctioned events. Players may hold other non-FIBA nationalities not displayed.

Criteria

To appear in this section a player must have either:

- Set a club record or won an individual award while at the club
- Played at least one official international match for their national team at any time
- Played at least one official NBA match at any time.

- (Israel) Lior Arditty 2 seasons: '91–'93
- (United States) Brian Rowsom 4 seasons: '91–'95
- (United States) (Israel) Joe Dawson 5 seasons: '91–'94, '96–'98
- (United States) (Israel) Willie Sims 4 seasons: '92–'96
- (Bosnia and Herzegovina) Nenad Marković 1 season: '96
- (United States) Corey Gaines 1 season: '96–'97
- (Israel) Meir Tapiro 2 seasons: '96–'98
- (Israel) Amir Katz 3 seasons: '96–'99
- (United States) Dennis Hopson 1 season: '97
- (United States) Ed Elisma 1 season: '97–'98
- (United States) Derrick Hamilton 1 season: '97–'98
- (Canada) Greg Newton 1 season: '98–'99
- (United States) Scotty Hopson 1 season: '12–'13
- (Israel) Afik Nissim 6 seasons: '12–'18
- (United States) Christian Watford 1 season: '13–'14
- (United States) Yancy Gates 1 season: '13–'14
- (Israel) Niv Berkowitz 3 seasons: '13–'15, '17–'18
- (Israel) Elishay Kadir 3 seasons: '13–'16
- (United States) Kevin Palmer 3 seasons: '13–'16
- (Jamaica) Adrian Uter 1 season: '14–'15
- (United States) Khalif Wyatt 2 seasons: '14–'16
- (Israel) Amit Simhon 3 seasons: '14–'16, '17–'18
- (United States) DeAndre Kane 1 season: '16
- (Nigeria) Alade Aminu 1 season: '15–'16
- (United States) Landon Milbourne 1 season: '16–'17
- (United States) Pierriá Henry 1 season: '16–'17
- (United States) Jordan Loyd 1 season: '17–'18
- (United States) Demetrius Treadwell 1 season: '17–'18
- (France) (Israel) Frédéric Bourdillon 2 seasons: '17–'19
- (United States) Elijah Bryant 1 season: '18–'19
- (United States) JP Tokoto 1 season: '18–'19
- (Nigeria) (United States) Suleiman Braimoh 1 season: '18–'19
- (Israel) Shimon Amsalem
- (Israel) Ari Rosenberg

== Participation in Europe ==
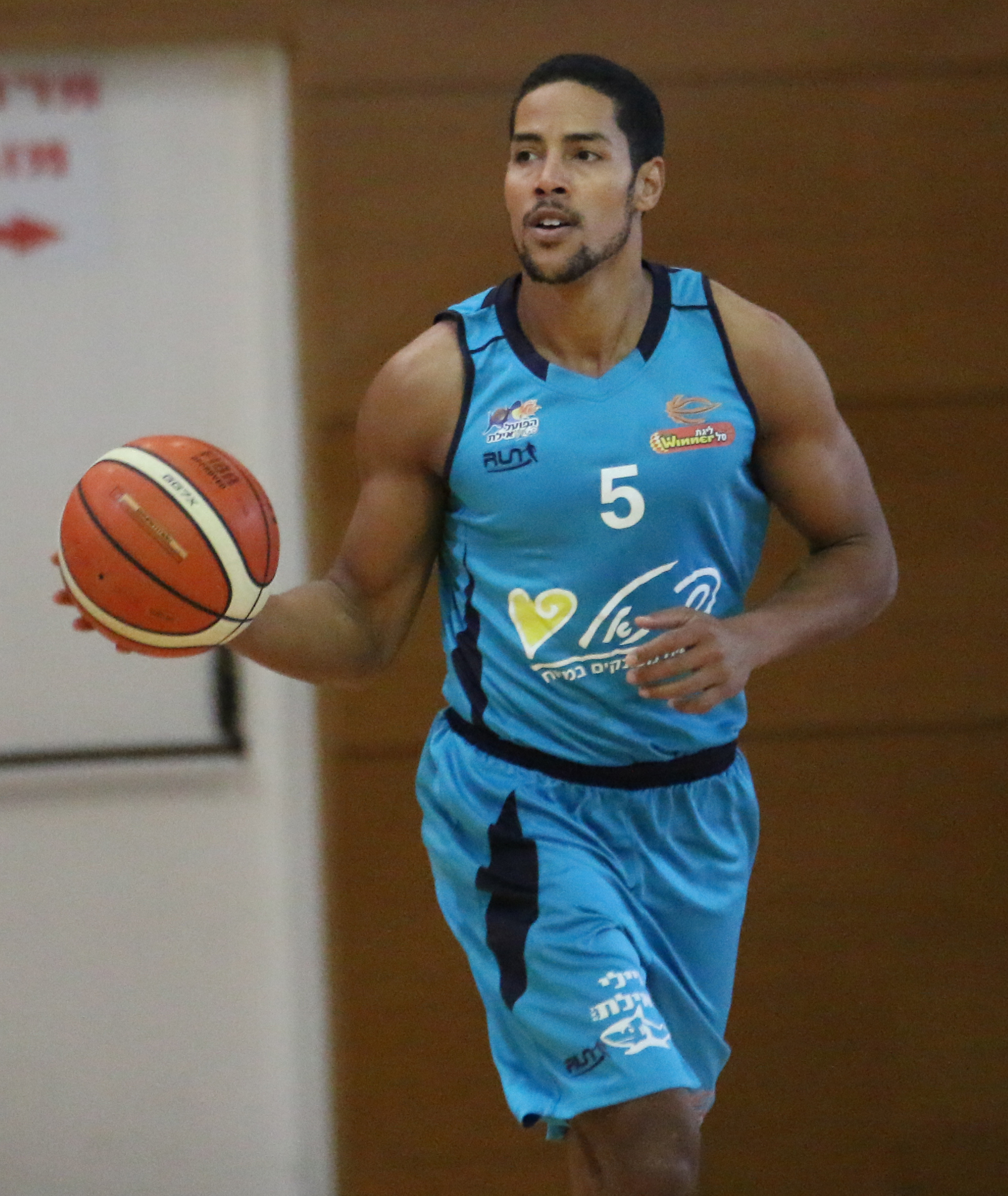
Chanan Colman

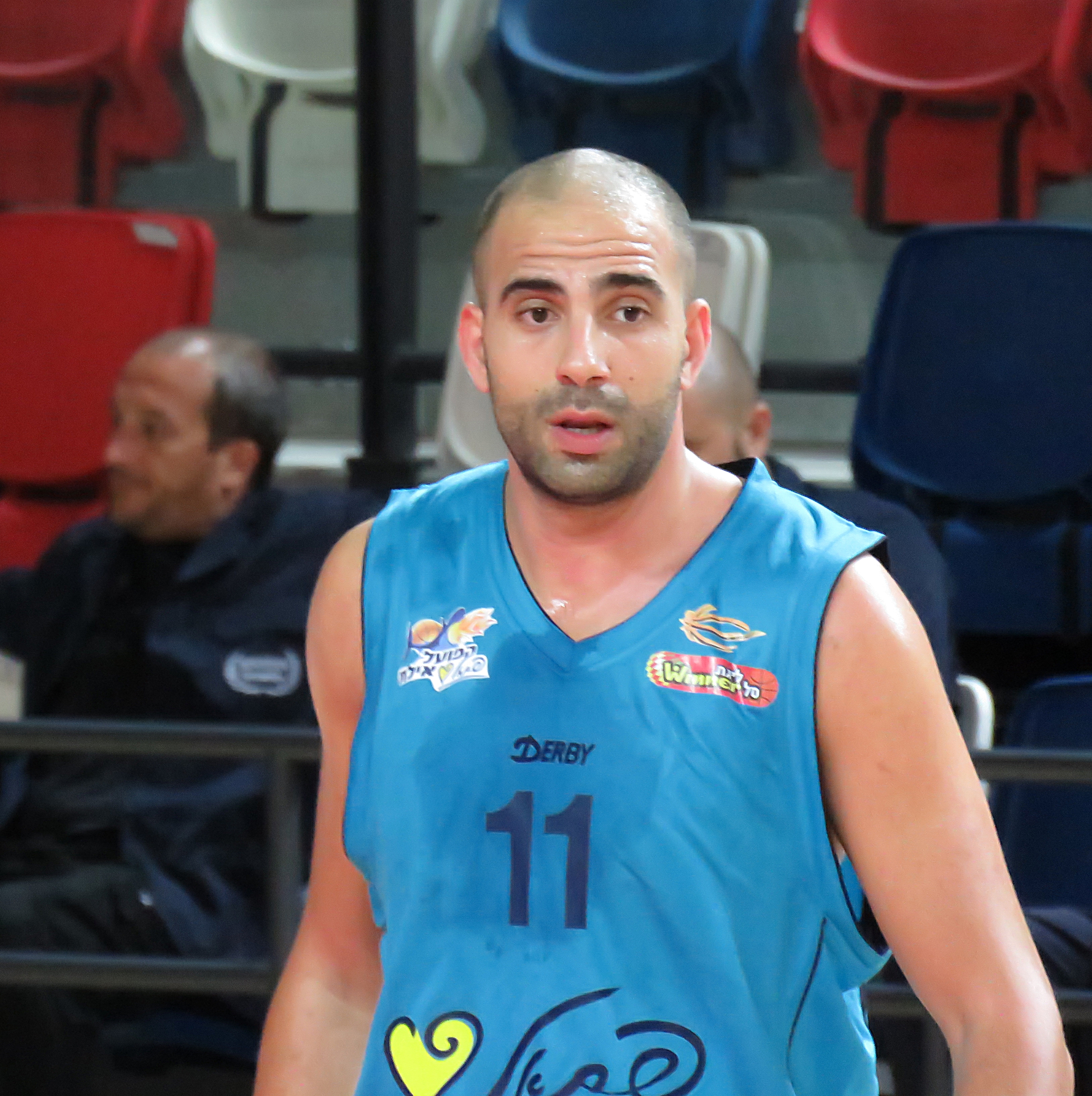
Elishay Kadir

- 1993–1994: Korać Cup
- 1994–1995: Korać Cup
- 1997–1998: ULEB Eurocup
- 1998–1999: Saporta Cup

Even though Eilat has constantly qualified for European basketball, they choose not to participate due to financial difficulties.

== Former managers ==
- Israel Lev
- Ralf Klein
- Effi Birnbaum
- Sharon Drucker
- Arik Shivek
- Udi Segal
- Moshe Weinkrantz
