= 2019–20 Israeli Basketball National League =

Israeli Basketball National League
- Season: 2019–20
- Dates: October 29, 2019 – March 16, 2020
- Teams: 14
- TV partner(s): Sport 5

The 2019–20 Israeli Basketball National League (or the Liga Leumit) is the 20th season of the Israeli Basketball National League.

== Teams ==
The following teams had changed divisions after the 2018–19 season:

Relegated from Premier League

- Bnei Herzliya

Promoted from Liga Artzit

- A.S. Ramat Hasharon
- Hapoel Hevel Modi'in

=== Venues and locations ===
League Map

| Team | City | Arena | Capacity |
|---|---|---|---|
| A.S. Ramat HaSharon | Ramat HaSharon | Oranim Hall | 900 |
| Bnei Herzliya | Herzliya | HaYovel Herzliya | 1,500 |
| Elitzur Eito Ashkelon | Ashkelon | Ashkelon Sports Arena | 3,000 |
| Elitzur Netanya | Netanya | Yeshurun Hall | 1,000 |
| Elitzur Yavne | Yavne | Ralf Klain Hall | 600 |
| Hapoel Afula | Afula | Nir Ha'emak Hall | 1,000 |
| Hapoel Galil Elyon | Upper Galilee and Kiryat Shmona | HaPais Kfar Blum | 2,200 |
| Hapoel Haifa | Haifa | Romema Arena | 5,000 |
| Hapoel Hevel Modi'in | Hevel Modi'in Regional Council | Nahshon Hall | 370 |
| Hapoel Ramat Gan Givatayim | Ramat Gan and Givatayim | Zisman Hall | 1,400 |
| Ironi Kiryat Ata | Kiryat Ata | Ramaz Hall | 1,000 |
| Maccabi Hod HaSharon | Hod HaSharon | Atidim Hall | 400 |
| Maccabi Kiryat Motzkin | Kiryat Motzkin | Goshen Hall | 750 |
| Maccabi Ra'anana | Ra'anana | Metro West | 1,850 |

== League table ==
=== Regular season ===
| Pos | Team | Pld | W | L | PF | PA | PD | Pts | Qualification or relegation |
|---|---|---|---|---|---|---|---|---|---|
| 1 | Bnei Herzliya | 18 | 13 | 5 | 1583 | 1481 | +102 | 31 | Advance to playoffs |
| 2 | Hapoel Afula | 18 | 13 | 5 | 1546 | 1463 | +83 | 31 | Advance to playoffs |
| 3 | Hapoel Haifa | 18 | 12 | 6 | 1587 | 1535 | +52 | 30 | Advance to playoffs |
| 4 | Elitzur Yavne | 18 | 12 | 6 | 1511 | 1449 | +62 | 30 | Advance to playoffs |
| 5 | Ironi Kiryat Ata | 18 | 10 | 8 | 1516 | 1527 | −11 | 28 | Advance to playoffs |
| 6 | Maccabi Hod HaSharon | 18 | 10 | 8 | 1561 | 1532 | +29 | 28 | Advance to playoffs |
| 7 | Hapoel Galil Elyon | 18 | 9 | 9 | 1489 | 1459 | +30 | 27 | Advance to playoffs |
| 8 | Maccabi Kiryat Motzkin | 18 | 9 | 9 | 1478 | 1435 | +43 | 27 | Advance to playoffs |
| 9 | Elitzur Eito Ashkelon | 18 | 8 | 10 | 1576 | 1578 | −2 | 26 | Advance to playouts |
| 10 | Maccabi Ra'anana | 18 | 7 | 11 | 1431 | 1511 | −80 | 25 | Advance to playouts |
| 11 | Elitzur Netanya | 18 | 7 | 11 | 1454 | 1454 | 0 | 25 | Advance to playouts |
| 12 | Hapoel Ramat Gan Givatayim | 18 | 6 | 12 | 1551 | 1629 | −78 | 24 | Advance to playouts |
| 13 | Hapoel Hevel Modi'in | 18 | 6 | 12 | 1547 | 1638 | −91 | 24 | Advance to playouts |
| 14 | A.S. Ramat HaSharon | 18 | 4 | 14 | 1449 | 1588 | −139 | 22 | Advance to playouts |

Updated to match(es) played on February 11, 2020. Source: iBasketball.co.il

==== Rounds 1 to 26 ====
| Home \ Away | ASR | BNH | EAS | ENE | EYA | HAF | HGE | HHA | HHM | HRG | IKA | MHH | MKM | MRA |
|---|---|---|---|---|---|---|---|---|---|---|---|---|---|---|
| A.S. Ramat HaSharon | | 72–99 | 84–93 | 85–83 | 89–96 | | 70–73 | | | 79–99 | 82–88 | 75–89 | | 96–72 |
| Bnei Herzliya | 95–86 | | | 79–75 | 77–72 | 78–93 | 88–72 | 99–107 | 84–83 | | | 81–76 | | 87–54 |
| Elitzur Eito Ashkelon | 85–78 | 101–90 | | 84–90 | 92–106 | 72–74 | | 80–73 | 132–126 | 100–92 | | | 73–75 | |
| Elitzur Netanya | 94–70 | | | | 74–78 | 75–77 | 74–75 | 79–69 | | 98–81 | 73–84 | 74–63 | | 68–83 |
| Elitzur Yavne | 86–65 | | 88–84 | 91–80 | | 99–86 | 79–87 | | | 99–84 | 77–65 | 76–89 | | 78–70 |
| Hapoel Afula | 93–73 | | 82–92 | | 66–67 | | 101–95 | 79–83 | 114–94 | 97–92 | | | 91–76 | 88–82 |
| Hapoel Galil Elyon | | 89–91 | 74–77 | | | 82–73 | | 94–96 | 72–64 | 100–74 | 95–70 | 87–78 | 85–87 | |
| Hapoel Haifa | 93–80 | 68–94 | 91–89 | 81–84 | 85–84 | | | | 92–73 | | 110–96 | 92–100 | 96–78 | |
| Hapoel Hevel Modi'in | 94–89 | 91–88 | | 89–80 | 82–90 | | 83–79 | | | 89–92 | 86–90 | 81–87 | 66–77 | 72–94 |
| Hapoel Ramat Gan Givatayim | | 81–86 | 96–84 | 85–81 | 94–85 | 79–83 | | 88–99 | | | 70–85 | | 87–82 | |
| Ironi Kiryat Ata | 80–90 | 73–86 | 79–77 | | | 74–78 | | 75–77 | 95–82 | 99–98 | | | 83–81 | 75–87 |
| Maccabi Hod HaSharon | | | 85–74 | | | 88–101 | 92–75 | 91–89 | 101–106 | 105–82 | 98–112 | | 74–77 | 74–73 |
| Maccabi Kiryat Motzkin | 76–86 | 98–77 | | 106–97 | 80–60 | 62–70 | 68–77 | | 82–86 | | | 94–78 | | 108–77 |
| Maccabi Ra'anana | | 90–104 | 95–88 | 74–75 | | | 94–78 | 72–86 | | 78–77 | 80–93 | 84–93 | 72–71 | |

Updated to match(es) played on February 7, 2020. Source: ibasketball.co.il
Legend: Blue = home team win; Red = away team win.

== Awards ==
=== MVP of the Round ===
| Round | Player | Team | EFF | Ref. |
October
| 1 | (United States) (Israel) Gabe Levin | Bnei Herzliya | 38 | |
November
| 2 | (United States) Cameron Naylor | Elitzur Netanya | 36 | |
| 3 | (United States) Billy McShepard (1/3) | Elitzur Yavne | 35 | |
| 4 | (United States) Jimmy Hall | Maccabi Hod HaSharon | 48 | |
| 5 | (Jamaica) Quintrell Thomas | Ironi Kiryat Ata | 37 | |
December
| 6 | (United States) Al'lonzo Coleman | Hapoel Afula | 43 | |
| 7 | (United States) Rakeem Buckles | Hapoel Haifa | 39 | |
| 8 | (United States) LaceDarius Dunn | Hapoel Afula | 40 | |
| 9 | (United States) Deondre Parks | Hapoel Hevel Modi'in | 37 | |
| 10 | (United States) Tyrell Nelson (1/2) | A.S. Ramat HaSharon | 39 | |
January
| 11 | (United States) Larry Anderson | Maccabi Ra'anana | 26 | |
| 12 | (United States) Paul Delaney | Elitzur Eito Ashkelon | 54 | |
| 13 | (United Kingdom) Laurence Ekperigin | Maccabi Kiryat Motzkin | 40 | |
| 14 | (United States) Tyrell Nelson (2/2) | A.S. Ramat HaSharon | 44 | |
| 15 | (United States) Billy McShepard (2/3) | Elitzur Yavne | 32 | |
February
| 16 | (United States) Kevin Capers | Hapoel Ramat Gan Givatayim | 34 | |
| 17 | (United States) Jason Siggers | Hapoel Haifa | 34 | |
| 18 | (United States) Billy McShepard (3/3) | Elitzur Yavne | 34 | |

== See also ==
- 2019–20 Israeli Basketball Premier League
- 2019–20 Israeli Basketball State Cup
