= 2017–18 Israeli Basketball State Cup =

Israeli Basketball State Cup
- Season: 2017–18
- Dates: October 18, 2017 – February 15, 2018
- Games played: 25
- Teams: 26

Finals
- Champions: Hapoel Holon (2nd title)
- Runners-up: Maccabi Tel Aviv
- Finals MVP: (United States) Glen Rice Jr.

The 2017–18 Israeli Basketball State Cup was the 58th edition of the Israeli Basketball State Cup, organized by the Israel Basketball Association.

The Final Four of the tournament was held from February 12–15 in the Menora Mivtachim Arena in Tel Aviv.

Hapoel Holon won its second State Cup title after an 86–84 win over Maccabi Tel Aviv in the Final. Glen Rice Jr. was named Final MVP

== First round ==
Maccabi Tel Aviv, Hapoel Jerusalem, Hapoel Holon, Maccabi Ashdod, Maccabi Haifa and Hapoel Be'er Sheva B.C. were pre-qualified for the Round of 16 and did not have to play in the first round.

Date	Home team	Score	Away team	Top performers	Ref
October 18, 2017	Hapoel Galil Elyon	83-93	Ironi Nahariya	Galil Elyon: Courtney Fells 19 pts, 5 ast, 4 stl Nahariya: Alex Young 25 pts, 6 reb	
October 18, 2017	Hapoel Afula/Gilboa	67-101	Hapoel Tel Aviv	Afula: Wayne Langston 21 pts, 9 reb H. Tel Aviv: Tomer Ginat 18 pts, 6 reb	
October 18, 2017	Elitzur Kiryat Ata	72-80	Maccabi Rishon LeZion	Kiryat Ata: Rodney Alexander 20 pts, 7 reb Rishon LeZion: Mark Tollefsen 20 pts, 7 reb	
October 18, 2017	Hapoel Migdal HaEmek	110-112	Maccabi Hod HaSharon	Migdal Haemek: Taylor Jones 26 pts, 11 reb, 6 ast Hod Hasharon: Yotam Shiran 28 pts, 9 reb	
October 19, 2017	Elitzur Yavne	72-89	Hapoel Eilat	Yavne: Germain Jordan 30 pts, 14 reb Eilat: Mike Rosario 24 pts, 5 reb, 6 ast	
October 19, 2017	Maccabi Kiryat Motzkin	67-80	Ironi Nes Ziona	Kiryat Motzkin: Folarin Campbell 15 pts, 6 ast Nes Ziona: Talib Zanna 14 pts, 7 reb, 3 stl	
October 19, 2017	Hapoel Ramat Gan/Givatayim	96-59	Hapoel Haifa	Ramat Gan: Robert Glenn 25 pts, 7 reb H. Haifa: Ismael Romero 19 pts, 7 reb	
October 19, 2017	Maccabi Rehovot	82-56	Hapoel Kfar Saba	Rehovot: Marcus Relphorde 23 pts, 4 reb, 3 stl Kfar Saba: Byron Wesley 24 pts, 4 reb, 3 stl	
October 25, 2017	Maccabi Ra'anana	81-80	Hapoel Gilboa Galil	Ra'anana: Samme Givens 20 pts, 6 reb, 7 ast Gilboa Galil: Zach LeDay 29 pts, 14 reb, 3 blk	
November 30, 2017	Maccabi Kiryat Gat	72-95	Bnei Herzliya	Kiryat Gat: Robert Rothbart 23 pts, 5 reb Herzliya: Jeff Adrien 23 pts, 11 reb	

== Round of 16 ==
Date	Home team	Score	Away team	Top performers	Ref
December 23, 2017	Bnei Herzliya	60-74	Hapoel Tel Aviv	Herzliya: Jeff Adrien 19 pts, 6 reb H. Tel Aviv: Matt Howard 14 pts, 13 reb	
December 23, 2017	Maccabi Rehovot	67-95	Hapoel Eilat	Rehovot: Al'lonzo Coleman 21 pts, 9 reb Eilat: Demetrius Treadwell 15 pts, 13 reb, 4 stl	
December 23, 2017	Ironi Nahariya	74-90	Hapoel Jerusalem	Nahariya: Corey Webster 18 pts, 6 ast Jerusalem: Yotam Halperin 20 pts, 6 reb	
December 24, 2017	Maccabi Hod HaSharon	77-91	Hapoel Holon	H. Hasharon: Vernon Teel 24 pts, 16 reb, 8 ast Holon: Tashawn Thomas 21 pts, 10 reb	
December 24, 2017	Maccabi Haifa	70-77	Maccabi Ashdod	M. Haifa: Reginald Buckner 17 pts, 9 reb Ashdod: Cameron Long 21 pts, 4 stl	
December 24, 2017	Maccabi Rishon LeZion	92-87	Ironi Nes Ziona	Rishon LeZion: Drew Crawford 24 pts Nes Ziona: Jaron Johnson 15 pts, 6 reb	
December 24, 2017	Hapoel Be'er Sheva	81-69	Hapoel Ramat Gan/Givatayim	Be'er Sheva: Storm Warren 35 pts, 9 reb Ramat Gan: Noam Laish 25 pts, 4 ast	
December 24, 2017	Maccabi Ra'anana	73-97	Maccabi Tel Aviv	Ra'anana: Samme Givens 12 pts, 11 reb, 4 ast M. Tel Aviv: Jonah Bolden 15 pts, 7 reb	

== Quarterfinals ==
Date	Home team	Score	Away team	Top performers	Ref
December 30, 2017	Maccabi Ashdod	89-56	Hapoel Eilat	Ashdod: Sek Henry 15 pts, 8 reb, 9 ast Eilat: Jordan Loyd 14 pts, 4 reb	
December 30, 2017	Hapoel Holon	100-98	Maccabi Rishon LeZion	Holon: Glen Rice Jr. 33 pts, 7 reb, 7 ast, 4 stl Rishon LeZion: Avi Ben-Chimol 20 pts, 9 ast	
December 31, 2017	Hapoel Be'er Sheva	62-79	Hapoel Jerusalem	Be'er Sheva: Storm Warren 23 pts, 6 reb, 5 blk Jerusalem: Ronald Roberts 16 pts, 7 reb, 3 blk	
December 31, 2017	Hapoel Tel Aviv	85-96	Maccabi Tel Aviv	H. Tel Aviv: Adrian Banks 28 pts M. Tel Aviv: Alex Tyus 20 pts, 12 reb	

== Final Four ==
=== Bracket ===
Semifinals; February 12
Maccabi Tel Aviv	76
Maccabi Ashdod	73
Hapoel Jerusalem	67
Hapoel Holon	76

Final; February 15
Maccabi Tel Aviv	84
Hapoel Holon	86

=== Semifinals ===
February 12, 2018	Maccabi Tel Aviv	76–73	Maccabi Ashdod	Tel Aviv
18:45	Scoring by quarter: 16-19, 17-16, 19-18, 24-20
Sport 5	Pts: DiBartolomeo 18; Rebs: Parakhouski 8 Asts: Roll 6 PIR: DiBartolomeo 19	Box Score; Report	Pts: Chubrevich 18; Rebs: Chubrevich 18; Asts: Henry, Long 4 PIR: Chubrevich 29	Arena: Menora Mivtachim Arena; Attendance: 9,000; Referees: Gili Cohen, Erez Gurion, Nir Meirson

February 12, 2018	Hapoel Jerusalem	67–76	Hapoel Holon	Tel Aviv
21:15	Scoring by quarter: 19-26, 18-10, 11-20, 19-20
Sport 5	Pts: Lucas 18; Rebs: Howell 10; Asts: Howell 4 PIR: Lucas 16	Box Score; Report	Pts: Rice Jr. 23; Rebs: Rice Jr. 10; Asts: Rice Jr. 6 PIR: Rice Jr. 25	Arena: Menora Mivtachim Arena; Attendance: 10,136; Referees: Omer Esteron, Amit Ballack, Tzachi Havdali

=== Final ===
February 15, 2018	Maccabi Tel Aviv	84–86	Hapoel Holon	Tel Aviv
21:00	Scoring by quarter: 18-20, 22-24, 22-17, 22-25
Sport 5	Pts: Tyus 17; Rebs: Tyus 9 Asts: Jackson 7 PIR: Tyus 27	Box Score; Report	Pts: Rice Jr. 28; Rebs: Alexander, Rice Jr. 8 Asts: Rice Jr. 7 PIR: Rice Jr. 29	Arena: Menora Mivtachim Arena; Attendance: 10,444; Referees: Sefi Shemesh, Kfir Mualem, Ofer Manheim

Starters:			Pts	Reb	Ast
G	55	(United States) Pierre Jackson	11	5	7
G	12	(Israel) John DiBartolomeo	10	2	4
G/F	7	(United States) DeAndre Kane	8	6	1
F	1	(United States) Deshaun Thomas	12	6	2
C	9	(Israel) Alex Tyus	17	9	0
Reserves:					
G	30	(United States) Norris Cole	12	2	2
G/F	5	(United States) Michael Roll	10	5	1
F/C	15	(Israel) Jake Cohen	4	1	1
F/C	18	(Israel) Itay Segev	0	2	0
F	4	(Israel) Karam Mashour	DNP		
G/F	50	(Israel) Yovel Zoosman	DNP		
Head coach:
(Croatia) Neven Spahija

Maccabi FOX Tel Aviv	Hapoel UNET Holon

Starters:			Pts	Reb	Ast
G	0	(United States) Tu Holloway	18	1	4
G	5	(Israel) Chanan Colman	3	0	1
G/F	41	(United States) Glen Rice Jr.	28	8	7
F	10	(Israel) Guy Pnini	15	2	2
F/C	11	(Israel) Joe Alexander	13	8	1
Reserves:					
F/C	35	(United States) TaShawn Thomas	9	5	1
G	12	(Israel) Shlomi Harush	0	1	0
G	6	(Israel) Tamir Blatt	0	0	0
F/C	1	(Israel) T. J. Cline	0	0	0
G	8	(Israel) Harel Dadon	DNP		
F/C	14	(Israel) Tal Zach	DNP		
Head coach:
(Israel) Dan Shamir

2018 Israeli State Cup Winners Hapoel Holon (2nd title)

== See also ==
- 2017–18 Israeli Basketball Premier League
