= 2018–19 Israeli Basketball National League =

Israeli Basketball National League
- Season: 2018–19
- Dates: October 31, 2018 – May 24, 2019
- Teams: 14
- TV partner: Sport 5

Regular season
- Season MVP: (United States) Jarmar Gulley
- Relegated: Hapoel Kfar Saba; Maccabi Rehovot

Finals
- Champions: Maccabi Haifa
- Runners-up: Hapoel Galil Elyon
- Finals MVP: (United States) Keron DeShields

Statistical leaders
Points	(Jamaica) Quintrell Thomas	23.5
Rebounds	(Jamaica) Quintrell Thomas	12.1
Assists	(Israel) Naor Sharon	8.8
Index Rating	(Jamaica) Quintrell Thomas	29.3

The 2018–19 Israeli Basketball National League (or the Liga Leumit) is the 19th season of the Israeli Basketball National League. It started on October 31, 2018 with the first round of the regular season and ended on May 24, 2019 with the finals. Maccabi Haifa have won the championship after defeating Hapoel Galil Elyon 3–1 in a best of five series.

== Teams ==
The following teams had changed divisions after the 2017–18 season:

Relegated from Premier League

- Maccabi Haifa

Promoted from Liga Artzit

- Elitzur Netanya
- Elitzur Eito Ashkelon

=== Venues and locations ===
League Map

Team	City	Arena	Capacity
Elitzur Eito Ashkelon	Ashkelon	Ashkelon Sports Arena	3,000
Elitzur Netanya	Netanya	Yeshurun Hall	1,000
Elitzur Yavne	Yavne	Ralf Klain Hall	600
Hapoel Afula	Afula	Nir Ha'emak Hall	1,000
Hapoel Galil Elyon/Safed	Upper Galilee and Safed	HaPais Kfar Blum	2,200
Hapoel Haifa	Haifa	Romema Arena	5,000
Hapoel Kfar Saba	Kfar Saba	HaYovel Kfar Saba	680
Hapoel Ramat Gan Givatayim	Ramat Gan and Givatayim	Zisman Hall	1,400
Ironi Kiryat Ata	Kiryat Ata	Ramaz Hall	1,000
Maccabi Haifa	Haifa	Romema Arena	5,000
Maccabi Kiryat Motzkin	Kiryat Motzkin	Goshen Hall	750
Maccabi Ra'anana	Ra'anana	Metro West	1,850
Maccabi Rehovot	Rehovot	Katzir Hall	500
Maccabi Hod HaSharon	Hod HaSharon	Atidim Hall	400

== League table ==
=== Regular season ===
Pos	Team	Pld	W	L	PF	PA	PD	Pts	Qualification or relegation
1	Maccabi Ra'anana	26	22	4	2441	2224	+217	48	Advance to playoffs
2	Maccabi Kiryat Motzkin	26	17	9	2210	2073	+137	43	Advance to playoffs
3	Hapoel Galil Elyon	26	17	9	2084	1996	+88	43	Advance to playoffs
4	Maccabi Haifa	26	16	10	2226	2110	+116	42	Advance to playoffs
5	Hapoel Afula	26	15	11	2301	2221	+80	41	Advance to playoffs
6	Elitzur Eito Ashkelon	26	14	12	2101	2111	−10	40	Advance to playoffs
7	Ironi Kiryat Ata	26	13	13	2141	2120	+21	39	Advance to playoffs
8	Elitzur Yavne	26	12	14	2092	2116	−24	38	Advance to playoffs
9	Elitzur Netanya	26	12	14	2214	2166	+48	38	Advance to playouts
10	Hapoel Haifa	26	11	15	2348	2414	−66	37	Advance to playouts
11	Maccabi Hod HaSharon	26	10	16	2189	2238	−49	36	Advance to playouts
12	Hapoel Ramat Gan Givatayim	26	10	16	2069	2222	−153	36	Advance to playouts
13	Maccabi Rehovot	26	9	17	2151	2211	−60	35	Advance to playouts
14	Hapoel Kfar Saba	26	4	22	2047	2392	−345	30	Advance to playouts

Updated to match(es) played on April 2, 2019. Source: ibasketball.co.il

=== Playouts ===
Pos	Team	Pld	W	L	PF	PA	PD	Pts	Qualification or relegation
1	Hapoel Haifa	31	15	16	2806	2856	−50	46	
2	Elitzur Netanya	31	14	17	2664	2620	+44	45	
3	Maccabi Hod HaSharon	31	13	18	2629	2679	−50	44	
4	Hapoel Ramat Gan Givatayim	31	13	18	2506	2650	−144	44	
5	Maccabi Rehovot (R)	31	11	20	2608	2646	−38	42	Relegation to Liga Artzit
6	Hapoel Kfar Saba (R)	31	5	26	2441	2828	−387	36	Relegation to Liga Artzit

Updated to match(es) played on May 1, 2019. Source: ibasketball.co.il
(R) Relegated

== Playoffs ==
Quarter-finals
1 Maccabi Ra'anana	2
8 Elitzur Yavne	1
4 Maccabi Haifa	2
5 Hapoel Afula	1
2 Maccabi Kiryat Motzkin	2
7 Ironi Kiryat Ata	1
3 Hapoel Galil Elyon	2
6 Elitzur Eito Ashkelon	1

Semi-finals
Maccabi Ra'anana	0
Maccabi Haifa	3
Maccabi Kiryat Motzkin	1
Hapoel Galil Elyon	3

Final
Maccabi Haifa	3
Hapoel Galil Elyon	1

== Statistical leaders ==
=== Points ===
Pos	Player	Club	PPG
1	(Jamaica) Quintrell Thomas	Maccabi Hod HaSharon	23.5
2	(United States) Jarmar Gulley	Maccabi Ra'anana	23.4
3	(United States) Jahmar Young	Hapoel Haifa	22.6
4	(United States) Sammy Yeager	Hapoel Afula	21.8
5	(United States) Marcus Relphorde	Maccabi Rehovot	20.0

=== Assists ===
Pos	Player	Club	APG
1	(Israel) Naor Sharon	Hapoel Haifa	8.8
2	(Israel) Guni Israeli	Hapoel Galil Elyon	7.7
3	(Israel) Ziv Ben-Zvi	Maccabi Kiryat Motzkin	6.6
4	(Israel) Yuval Naimy	Maccabi Rehovot	6.3
5	(Israel) Niv Berkowitz	Elitzur Eito Ashkelon	5.8

=== Rebounds ===
Pos	Player	Club	RPG
1	(Jamaica) Quintrell Thomas	Maccabi Hod HaSharon	12.1
2	(United States) Jeff Allen	Hapoel Haifa	11.7
3	(United States) Marvin Jefferson	Elitzur Netanya	11.5
4	(United States) Billy McShepard	Elitzur Eito Ashkelon	11.4
5	(United States) Brandon Edwards	Elitzur Yavne	11.0

=== Efficiency ===
Pos	Player	Club	PIR
1	(Jamaica) Quintrell Thomas	Maccabi Hod HaSharon	29.3
2	(United States) Jarmar Gulley	Maccabi Ra'anana	24.6
3	(United States) Jeff Allen	Hapoel Haifa	24.2
4	(United States) Brandon Edwards	Elitzur Yavne	24.1
5	(United States) Billy McShepard	Elitzur Eito Ashkelon	24.0

=== Other statistics ===
Category	Player	Team	Average
Steals	(United States) Jarmar Gulley	Maccabi Ra'anana	2.5
Blocks	(Australia) Jo Lual-Acuil	Hapoel Galil Elyon	2.3
Turnovers	(Israel) Naor Sharon	Hapoel Haifa	3.7
Minutes	(Israel) Naor Sharon	Hapoel Haifa	36:36
2P%	(United States) Tyler Smith	Elitzur Eito Ashkelon	66.0%
3P%	(Israel) Noam Laish	Hapoel Haifa	44.1%
FT%	(Israel) Eyal Shulman	Hapoel Ramat Gan Givatayim	88.9%

Source: ibasketball.co.il

== Awards ==
=== Finals MVP ===
Pos.	Player	Team
G	(United States) Keron DeShields	Maccabi Haifa

Source: @LeumitBBall

=== Regular season Best Import ===
Pos.	Player	Team
F	(United States) Jarmar Gulley	Maccabi Ra'anana

Source: @LeumitBBall

=== Most Improved Player ===
Pos.	Player	Team
F	(Israel) Hen Halfon	Elitzur Eito Ashkelon

Source: @LeumitBBall

=== Rising Star ===
Pos.	Player	Team
G	(Israel) Eidan Alber	Hapoel Kfar Saba

Source: @LeumitBBall

=== Coach of the Year ===
Coach	Team
(Israel) Avner Yaor	Maccabi Ra'anana

Source: @LeumitBBall

=== All-League First Team ===
First Team
Pos.	Player	Team
G	(Israel) Guni Israeli	Hapoel Galil Elyon
G	(Israel) Ziv Ben-Zvi	Maccabi Kiryat Motzkin
G	(Israel) Niv Berkowitz	Elitzur Eito Ashkelon
F	(United States) Jarmar Gulley	Maccabi Ra'anana
C	(Jamaica) Quintrell Thomas	Maccabi Hod HaSharon

Source: @LeumitBBall

== See also ==
- 2018–19 Israeli Basketball Premier League
- 2018–19 Israeli Basketball State Cup
