= Niv Berkowitz =

Israeli basketball player (born 1986)

Niv Berkowitz ניב ברקוביץ
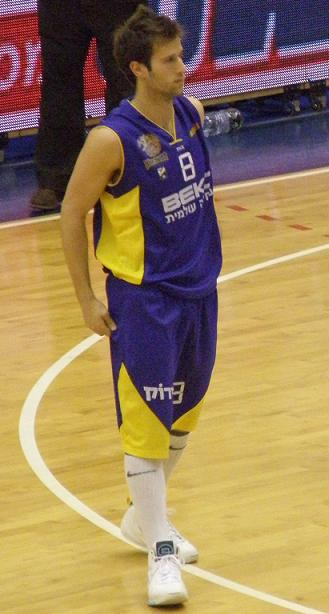
- Berkowitz playing for Hapoel Holon in 2010

Personal information
- Born: April 25, 1986 (age 40) Ramat HaSharon, Israel
- Listed height: 1.91 m (6 ft 3 in)
- Listed weight: 84 kg (185 lb)

Career information
- College: Marquette (2004)
- NBA draft: 2008: undrafted
- Playing career: 2004–2022
- Position: Point guard / shooting guard

Career history
- 2004–2006: Ramat HaSharon
- 2006–2007: Hapoel Holon
- 2007–2008: Hapoel Yokneam/Meggido
- 2008–2009: Elitzur Kiryat Ata
- 2009: Hapoel Afula
- 2009–2010: Hapoel Holon
- 2010–2011: Maccabi Ashdod
- 2011–2012: Ironi Ashkelon
- 2012–2013: Bnei Herzliya
- 2013–2015: Hapoel Eilat
- 2015–2017: Ironi Nahariya
- 2017–2018: Hapoel Eilat
- 2018–2019: Elitzur Eito Ashkelon
- 2019–2020: Hapoel Haifa
- 2020–2021: Elitzur Yavne
- 2021–2022: Maccabi Hod HaSharon

Career highlights
- 2× Israeli Premier League All-Star (2012, 2016); All-Israeli National League First team (2019)

Niv Berkowitz (Hebrew: ניב ברקוביץ; born April 25, 1986) is an Israeli former professional basketball player. He played for 18 season at various Israeli clubs in the Israeli Basketball Premier League, and the Liga Leumit. Niv is the son of former basketball player Miki Berkowitz. He has a son, Ariel, who is currently in the youth team at Maccabi Ironi Ramat Gan.

== Early years ==
Berkowitz was born in Ramat HaSharon, Israel, he played for Hapoel Ramat HaSharon and Maccabi Tel Aviv youth teams. In 2004, Berkowitz joined Marquette University in Milwaukee, Wisconsin, he played in 7 games before starting his professional career.

== Professional career ==
On July 4, 2013, Berkowitz signed with Hapoel Eilat for the 2013–14 season.

On July 4, 2014, Berkowitz signed a one-year contract extension with Hapoel Eilat. he helped Eilat reach the Israeli League Finals, where they eventually lost to Hapoel Jerusalem.

On July 19, 2015, Berkowitz signed with Ironi Nahariya for the 2015–16 season. That season, he led the league in assists by averaging 6.7 per game. Berkowitz was also selected to the Israeli League All-Star game.

On July 5, 2016, Berkowitz signed a one-year contract extension with Nahariya.

On August 1, 2017, Berkowitz returned to Hapoel Eilat for a second stint, signing a one-year contract.

On August 17, 2018, Berkowitz signed a one-year deal with Elitzur Eito Ashkelon of the National League. In 29 games played for Asheklon, he averaged 10.6 points, 3.5 rebounds, 5.8 assists and 1.4 steals per game, earning a spot in the All-National League First Team.

On June 24, 2019, Berkowitz signed with Hapoel Haifa for the 2019–20 season.

== Israeli national team ==
Berkowitz was a member of the Israeli U-18 and U-20 national teams.
