= Keron DeShields =

American-Syrian basketball player (born 1992)

No. 55 – Al Ittihad Sc
- Position: Point guard / Shooting guard
- League: Libyan Division I Basketball League

Personal information
- Born: December 4, 1992 (age 33) Baltimore, Maryland, U.S.
- Listed height: 6 ft 2 in (1.88 m)
- Listed weight: 190 lb (86 kg)

Career information
- High school: St. Vincent Pallotti (Laurel, Maryland); Towson Catholic (Baltimore, Maryland); Vermont Academy (Saxtons River, Vermont)
- College: Montana (2011–2014); Tennessee State (2015–2016)
- NBA draft: 2016: undrafted
- Playing career: 2016–present

Career history
- 2016–2017: Latina Basket
- 2017: Jászberényi KSE
- 2018: Debreceni EAC
- 2018: Hapoel Afula
- 2018: Rethymno Cretan Kings
- 2018–2019: Maccabi Haifa
- 2019–2020: Šiauliai
- 2020: Hapoel Afula
- 2020–2021: Ironi Ramat Gan
- 2021: Hapoel Afula
- 2021: Cestistica San Severo
- 2021: Trotamundos B.B.C.
- 2022: Hapoel Afula
- 2022: Héroes de Falcón
- 2022–2023: Hapoel Hevel Modi'in
- 2023: Metros de Santiago
- 2023–2024: Comunicaciones
- 2024: Maccabi Rishon LeZion
- 2024–2025: Al-Ittihad Jeddah
- 2025: Al Riyadi
- 2025: Panionios
- 2026–present: Al Ahli Tripoli

Career highlights
- Israeli National League champion (2019); Israeli National League Finals MVP (2019); SPB League scoring champion (2021); Saudi Basketball League MVP (2025); Saudi Basketball League champion (2025); Bahrain League champion (2025); Bahrain League Finals MVP (2025); Lebanese Basketball League champion (2025); Libyan Super Cup champion (2025); Libyan Super Cup MVP (2025); First-team All-OVC (2016)

Keron Melique DeShields (born December 4, 1992) is an American–born naturalized Syrian professional basketball player for Al Ittihad SC of the Libyan Division I Basketball League. He played college basketball for the Montana Grizzlies and Tennessee State Tigers. Also has represented the Syrian national team for Fiba Asian Cup Qualifiers 2025.

== Early life and college career ==
DeShields attended Vermont Academy in Saxtons River, Vermont, where he averaged a team-high 20 points and 5.0 assists per game, and was a first team all-conference selection as a senior.

Deshields played three years at Montana. He helped the Grizzlies reach the Big Sky Tournament Championships and NCAA Tournament berths in 2012 and 2013. On March 10, 2014, DeShields was named Honorable Mention All-Big Sky, alongside his teammate Jordan Gregory.

On May 30, 2014, Deshields was transferred from Montana to Tennessee State, but sat out first season at Tennessee State per NCAA Transfer rules.

In his senior year at Tennessee State, DeShields led the team and ranked seventh in the Ohio Valley Conference with 16.5 points per game and also averaged 3.3 rebounds and 3.0 assists in 32.8 minutes per game. DeShields was named First Team All-OVC, OVC All-Newcomer Team and NABC First Team All-District 19.

== Professional career ==
=== 2016–17 season ===
On July 16, 2016, DeShields started his professional career with Latina Basket of the Italian Serie A2 Basket, signing a one-year deal. On December 11, 2016, DeShields recorded a season-high 30 points, shooting 12-of-21 from the field, in a 93–90 win over Viola Reggio Calabria. In 30 games played for Latina, DeShields averaged 15.5 points, 4.7 rebounds, 3.8 assists and 1.1 steals per game.

=== 2017–18 season ===
On September 11, 2017, DeShields signed a one-year deal with the Hungarian team Jászberényi KSE. On January 12, 2018, DeShields parted ways with Jászberényi to join Debreceni EAC. On February 6, 2018, he parted ways with Debreceni after appearing in four games.

On February 19, 2018, DeShields signed with the Israeli team Hapoel Afula for the rest of the Israeli National League season, as injury cover for Tre Simmons. On March 20, 2018, DeShields recorded a career-high 32 points, shooting 11-of-18 from the field, along with nine rebounds and eight assists in a 93–86 win over Maccabi Hod HaSharon.

On April 30, 2018, DeShields signed with the Greek team Rethymno Cretan Kings for the rest of the season, replacing Malcolm Armstead.

=== 2018–19 season ===
On June 28, 2018, DeShields returned to Israel for a second stint, signing a two-year deal with Maccabi Haifa. On April 23, 2019, DeShields recorded a season-high 30 points, shooting 11-of-22 from the field, along with four rebounds and seven assists in an 85–82 playoff win over Maccabi Ra'anana. On May 24, 2019, DeShields led Haifa to win the 2019 Israeli National League Championship after averaging 18.2 points in four games played in the final series against Hapoel Galil Elyon. He was subsequently named the Finals MVP.

=== 2019–20 season ===
On October 7, 2019, DeShields signed a one-year deal with Šiauliai of the Lithuanian Basketball League. He averaged 7.4 points and 2.9 assists per game.

On March 6, 2020, he signed with Hapoel Afula of the Israeli National League.

=== 2020–21 season ===
On July 19, 2020, DeShields signed with Ironi Ramat Gan in Israel.

=== 2021–22 season ===
On September 22, 2021, DeShields signed with Cestistica San Severo on the Serie A2 Basket, and played six games for the team.

He subsequently joined Trotamundos B.B.C. of the Venezuelan league for 12 games, and averaged 20.8 points, 4.8 assists, 3.8 rebounds, and 1.2 steals per game.

On January 5, 2022, DeShields signed with Hapoel Afula of the Israeli National League. In 19 games during the remainder of the 2021–22 season, he averaged 20.7 points, 4.3 rebounds, and 6.6 assists in 35.8 minutes per game while shooting 48.6% from the field and 39.3% from three-point range.

== National team career ==
DeShields joined the Syria national team as a naturalized player for the 2025 FIBA Asia Cup. On August 8, 2025, he scored 21 points in his tournament debut against Japan. He went on to average 22.0 points, 7.0 rebounds , 5.3 assists in the Asian Cup Qualifiers.
