= Elitzur Ramla =

Elitzur Ramla may refer to:

- Elitzur Ramla B.C., a basketball club based in Ramla in Israel
- Elitzur Ramla (women's basketball), a women's basketball team from Ramla, Israel
