= Billy McShepard =

American basketball player

Personal information
- Born: August 10, 1987 (age 39)
- Listed height: 6 ft 10 in (2.08 m)
- Listed weight: 230 lb (104 kg)

Career information
- High school: Bertie (Windsor, North Carolina)
- College: Louisburg College (2007–2009); Valdosta State (2009–2011)
- NBA draft: 2011: undrafted
- Playing career: 2011–2022
- Position: Power forward / center

Career history
- 2011–2012: Sioux Falls Skyforce
- 2012–2013: Texas Legends
- 2013–2014: BIS Baskets Speyer
- 2014–2015: Swans Gmunden
- 2015–2016: Ramat HaSharon
- 2016: San Lorenzo de Almagro
- 2016–2017: Ironi Nes Ziona
- 2017–2018: Passlab Yamagata Wyverns
- 2018: Yulon Luxgen Dinos
- 2018–2019: Elitzur Eito Ashkelon
- 2019–2020: Elitzur Yavne
- 2020–2022: Maccabi Ashdod
- 2022: Maccabi Hod HaSharon

Billy McShepard (born August 10, 1987) is an American former professional basketball player. He spent the majority of his career playing in the NBA G League and overseas in Israel. McShepard played college basketball for Louisburg College and Valdosta State.

== Early life and college career ==
McShepard attended Bertie High School in Windsor, North Carolina. He played college basketball for Louisburg College and Valdosta State.

In his senior year at Valdosta State, he averaged 9.8 points, 8.6 rebounds and 1 block per game.

== Professional career ==
On August 3, 2016, McShepard signed a one-year deal with Ironi Nes Ziona. In 18 games played for Nes Ziona, he averaged 14.1 points, 9.9 rebounds and 1.2 steals per game.

On November 26, 2018, McShepard returned to Israel for a third stint, signing with Elitzur Eito Ashkelon. McShepard finished the season as the league fourth best rebounder with 11.4 rebounds per game, to go with 19.2 points per game.

On August 18, 2019, McShepard signed with Elitzur Yavne for the 2019–20 season.

== Career statistics ==
Legend
GP	Games played	GS	Games started	MPG	Minutes per game
FG%	Field goal percentage	3P%	3-point field goal percentage	FT%	Free throw percentage
RPG	Rebounds per game	APG	Assists per game	SPG	Steals per game
BPG	Blocks per game	PPG	Points per game	**Bold**	Career high

Year	Team	GP	GS	MPG	FG%	3P%	FT%	RPG	APG	SPG	BPG	PPG
2017-18	Yamagata	56	7	24.4	.444	.302	.738	8.9	1.8	1.1	0.9	16.8
