= Glen Rice Jr. =

American basketball player (born 1991)

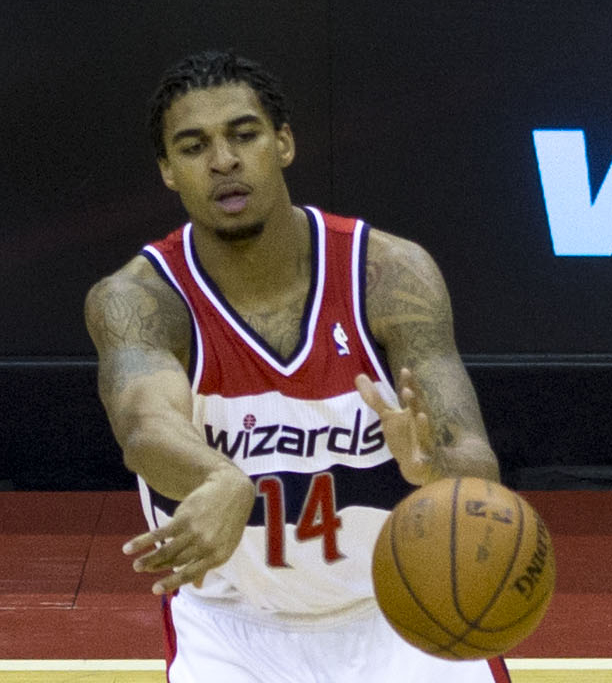
- Rice with the Washington Wizards in 2013

No. 41 – Flecheros de Matagalpa
- Position: Shooting guard / small forward
- League: LSB

Personal information
- Born: January 1, 1991 (age 35) Miami, Florida, U.S.
- Listed height: 6 ft 6 in (1.98 m)
- Listed weight: 210 lb (95 kg)

Career information
- High school: Walton (Marietta, Georgia)
- College: Georgia Tech (2009–2012)
- NBA draft: 2013: 2nd round, 35th overall pick
- Drafted by: Philadelphia 76ers
- Playing career: 2012–present

Career history
- 2012–2013: Rio Grande Valley Vipers
- 2013–2015: Washington Wizards
- 2014: →Iowa Energy
- 2014–2015: →Fort Wayne Mad Ants
- 2015: Rio Grande Valley Vipers
- 2016–2017: Halcones de Ciudad Obregón
- 2017: TNT KaTropa
- 2017–2018: Hapoel Holon
- 2018: Caciques de Humacao
- 2018: Aguacateros de Michoacán
- 2019: Instituto ACC
- 2019: Halcones de Ciudad Obregón
- 2019: Plaza Valerio
- 2019: New Zealand Breakers
- 2020: Al-Fateh
- 2020: Juventus Utena
- 2021–2022: Maccabi Haifa
- 2022–2024: Brillantes del Zulia
- 2024: Cocodrilos de Caracas
- 2024–2025: Real Estelí
- 2025: Brillantes del Zulia
- 2025–2026: Flecheros de Matagalpa
- 2026–present: Hapoel Safed

Career highlights
- Israeli Cup winner (2018); Israeli Cup MVP (2018); Israeli League Top scorer (2018); Israeli League All-Star (2018); CIBACOPA champion (2017); CIBACOPA Finals MVP (2017); CIBACOPA All-Star (2017); NBA D-League champion (2013); NBA D-League All-Rookie Second Team (2013)
- Stats at NBA.com
- Stats at Basketball Reference

Glen Anthony Rice Jr. (born January 1, 1991) is an American professional basketball player for the Hapoel Safed of the Liga Leumit. He was drafted by the Philadelphia 76ers in the 2013 NBA draft, but was immediately traded on draft night to the Washington Wizards. Rice played college basketball for the Georgia Tech Yellow Jackets, but was dismissed from the team during his junior season. He is the son of NBA All-Star Glen Rice.

Rice was the Cobb County, Georgia player of the year as a high school junior at George Walton Comprehensive High School, and was an All-State selection in both his junior and senior years. He joined a highly recruited class at Georgia Tech, but was dismissed from school during his junior year following an alleged shooting. Prior to being drafted, he played a year for the Rio Grande Valley Vipers of the NBA Development League (D-League), and led the Vipers to a D-League championship in 2013. He was MVP of the 2018 Israeli State Cup and led the Israeli League in scoring.

== High school career ==
As a junior, Rice was the 2008 Cobb County high school basketball boy's player of the year, according to the Marietta Daily Journal, as well as a third team (honorable mention) All-State selection by The Atlanta Journal-Constitution. When he signed his National Letter of Intent in November 2008, Rice was described as a late bloomer. As a senior, he was a Class AAAAA All-state selection (2nd team by The Atlanta Journal-Constitution and 1st team by the Georgia Sportswriters Association).

Rice was ranked as the 13th, 32nd, and 35th-best high school basketball shooting guard in the country as a senior in 2009 by Rivals.com, Scout.com, and ESPN, respectively. His father's alma mater, University of Michigan did not recruit him for their basketball team until after he had already committed to Georgia Tech. Rice was part of a Georgia Tech recruiting class that was ranked 21st in the nation, and included Derrick Favors.

Rice's Georgia Tech biography credits him with leading his high school to a state title in basketball as a senior, but the Georgia High School Association records show that his high school did not win a state championship in any sport during his senior season. The Atlanta Journal-Constitution confirms that his basketball team was eliminated in the second round of the class AAAAA tournament.

College recruiting
Name	Hometown	School	Height	Weight	Commit date
Glen Rice Jr. SG	Marietta, Georgia	Walton (GA)	6 ft 4 in (1.93 m)	177.5 lb (80.5 kg)	Jul 24, 2008
Glen Rice Jr. SG	Recruit ratings: Scout: Rivals: (89)				
Overall recruit ranking: Scout: 32 (SG) Rivals: 45, 13 (SG) ESPN: 35 (SG)
Note: In many cases, Scout, Rivals, 247Sports, On3, and ESPN may conflict in their listings of height and weight.; In these cases, the average was taken. ESPN grades are on a 100-point scale.; Sources: "Georgia Tech 2009 Basketball Commitments". Rivals.; "2009 Georgia Tech Basketball Commits". Scout.; "ESPN". ESPN.; "Scout.com Team Recruiting Rankings". Scout.; "2009 Team Ranking". Rivals.

== College career ==
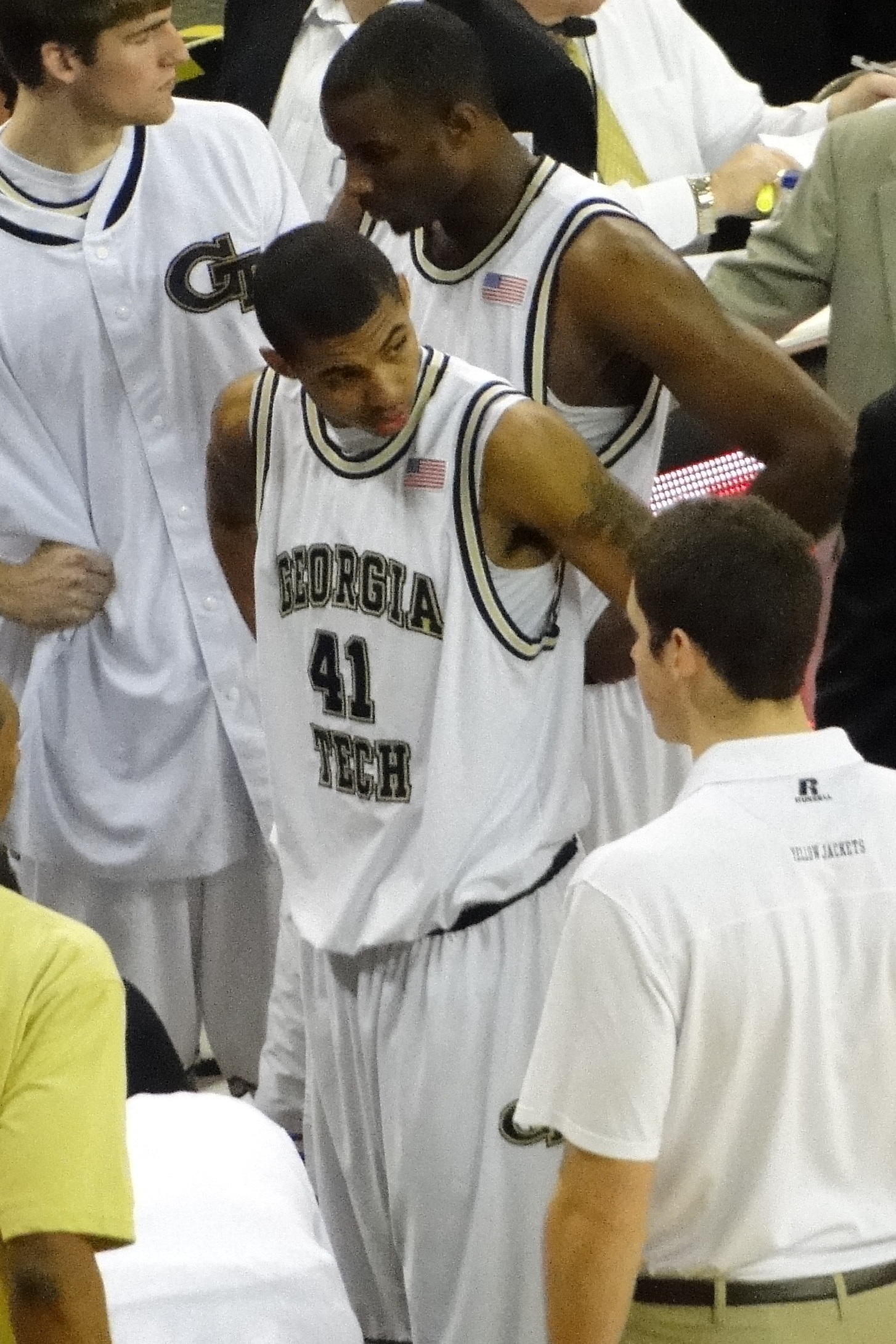
Rice (#41) vs. Kentucky State (2010-01-30)

Rice began his freshman season on the bench, but he became a starter and played in all but one game for the 2009–10 Georgia Tech Yellow Jackets men's basketball team. He scored in double figures six times, including the 2010 NCAA Men's Division I Basketball Tournament second-round game against Ohio State. He had season highs for points (17), rebounds (8) and assists (4) in the March 2, 2010 game against Clemson. He started the final 11 games of his freshman season. Rice earned ACC All-Academic team recognition. Although he was one of four people to receive at least one first place vote for ACC Rookie of the year, he was not on the five-player ACC All-Rookie team.

As a sophomore, Rice posted six 20-point games, but three times (all Georgia Tech victories) he played at least 10 minutes while scoring no points. He started 23 of 31 games that year. Rice ranked second on the team in terms of minutes, points, rebounds, assists and steals. He ranked 17th in the ACC in scoring and 6th in steals. Three times Rice had more than 10 rebounds, giving him three double-doubles. Early in his sophomore season, the 2010–11 Yellow Jackets team was in the same Legends Classic Tournament as the 2010–11 Michigan Wolverines men's basketball team, but since the Wolverines did not qualify for the championship game, he did not get to play against his father's alma mater. In mid-January, Rice had his first back-to-back twenty-point scoring nights on January 16 and 19 against North Carolina and Wake Forest. Later in the season, he posted season highs in rebounds and point in back-to-back games: Rice had 12 rebounds on January 30 against the Maryland Terrapins and 28 points on February 3 against the Miami Hurricanes. Coach Paul Hewitt suspended him for the final three games of the season.

Following the 2011 NBA draft selection of Iman Shumpert, Rice was the leading returning scorer for the 2011–12 Yellow Jackets. He was suspended for the first three games of the 2011–12 season for an undisclosed violation of team rules. When he returned to the lineup following his suspension on November 18, he assumed the role of a sixth man. In his return to the starting lineup on December 3 against the Tulane Green Wave, Rice not only posted his first double-double of the season with 11 points and 11 rebounds, but also had his first career 4-blocked shot effort. He posted his second double-double of the season on December 19 against Alabama A&M when he tallied 21 points, 10 rebounds and 3 blocks. Rice followed that with a double-double in his next outing on December 22 against Mercer when he posted 19 points and 11 rebounds. The ACC requires that a player play in 75% of his team's games to be qualified for statistical rankings. After his 9th game on December 22, Rice qualified despite the three-game suspension, Rice ranked among the conference leaders in points, rebounds, blocks and steals per game plus field goal percentage. On December 29, Rice had a scoreless night during a loss to Fordham. On January 7 against #3 Duke, he posted a career-high-tying 28 points with 8 rebounds. On January 11, against NC State, he had 22 points to mark his second career back-to-back 20-point performances. On January 29, Rice was hobbled with a big toe injury that limited him to 4 points in 22 minutes. At the beginning of February, Rice was sidelined with a foot injury. He returned to the lineup for three games before being suspended indefinitely for non-basketball issues. The suspension was Rice's second of the season and third in his college career. Coach Brian Gregory dismissed him from the team on March 13 following an incident involving driving under the influence and discharging a firearm while under the influence in which Rice was charged with permitting unlawful operation. Following the bad publicity Bo Ryan received about blocking a transfer, Gregory stated that he would not block a transfer to any university. Following his dismissal, CBS Sports regarded him as one of the top 20 potential transfers in the country.

== Professional career ==
=== Rio Grande Valley Vipers (2012–2013) ===
Rice was drafted in the fourth round of the November 2, 2012 NBA Development League draft by the Rio Grande Valley Vipers. He made the opening day roster and made his professional debut on November 23 against the Bakersfield Jam. Rice did not play much early in the year, totalling only 147 minutes in the first 22 games. On February 4, Rice posted professional career highs of 35 points and 15 rebounds against Springfield Armor. The day before the 2013 NBA All-Star Game, he participated in the 2013 D-League Dream Factory Dunk Contest. On March 5, Rice posted 20 points, 14 rebounds and 4 assists against the Iowa Energy. On March 6, he posted 29 points, 11 rebounds and 3 blocks against the Austin Toros. On March 10, he posted 23 points, 8 rebounds, 3 assists and a steal against the Reno Bighorns. On March 11, Rice was named D-League Player of the Week after averaging 24.0 points, 11.0 rebounds, and 2.3 assists in three victories that week. Following the regular season, Rice was named 2012–13 NBA D-League All-Rookie second team. Rice emerged as a starter and helped the Vipers win their final 16 consecutive games, including three consecutive D-League playoff series sweeps on the way the 2013 NBA D-League championship. Rice averaged 25 points, 9.5 rebounds, 4.3 assists, 2 blocks and 2 steals in the playoffs including averaging 29 points, 11.5 rebounds, 4 assists, 3 steals and 3.5 blocks in the D-League finals.

=== Washington Wizards (2013–2015) ===
As the D-League season wound down, Rice emerged as a sleeper draft choice for the 2013 NBA draft. His performances ended up helping him go from the possibility of being undrafted to being taken as early as the late first round. He was one of 60 players invited to the NBA Draft Combine. On June 27, 2013, Rice was selected with the 35th overall pick of the NBA Draft by the Philadelphia 76ers, but was traded to the Washington Wizards for the 38th and 54th selections, which turned out to be Nate Wolters and Arsalan Kazemi, respectively. He became the fourth player with D-League experience to be drafted and at 35th overall was the highest D-League veteran to have been drafted to that point. However, P. J. Hairston became the first D-League first-rounder when he was drafted 26th in the 2014 NBA draft to eclipse this record.

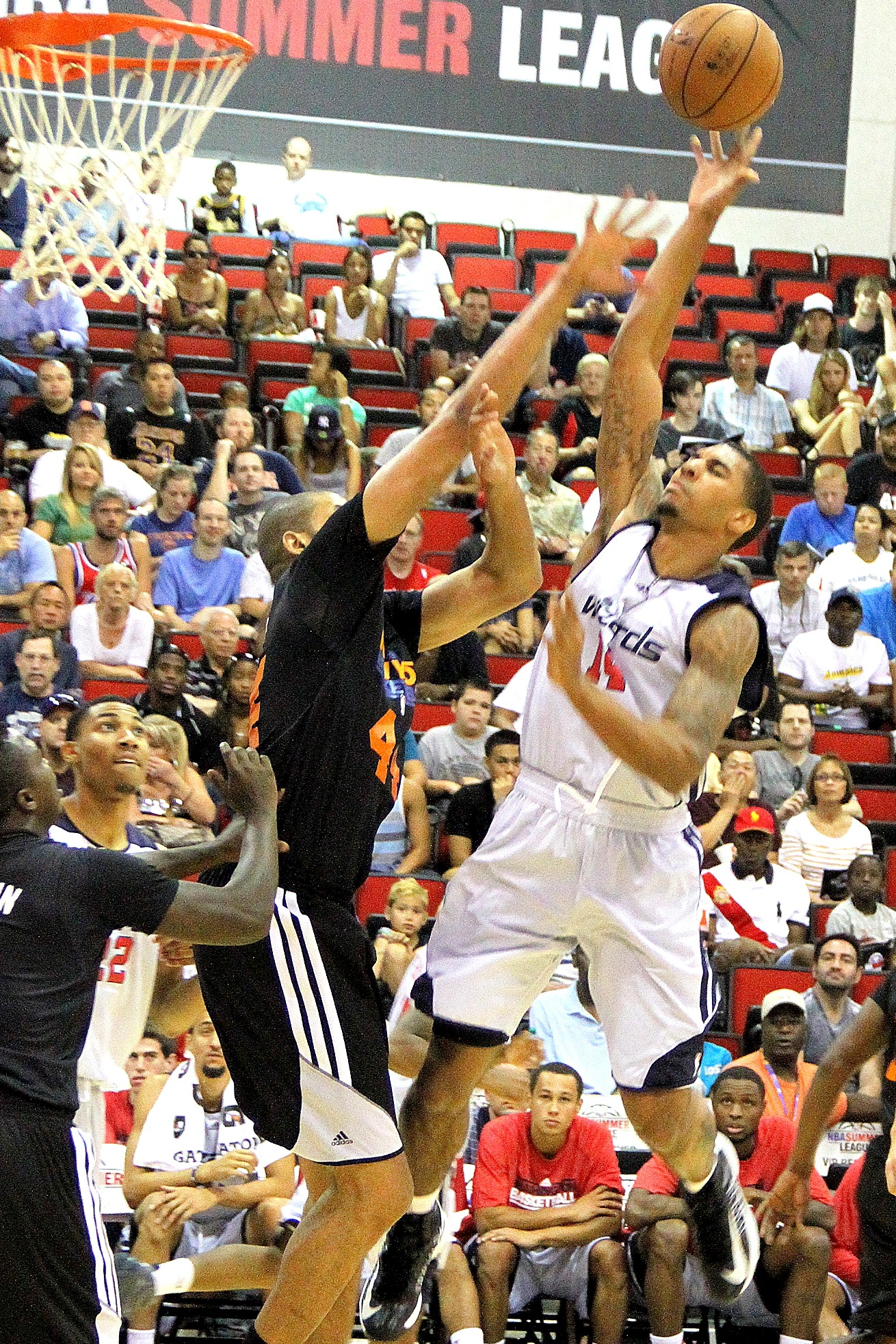
Rice playing for the Washington Wizards' 2013 NBA Summer League team

On July 8, 2013, Rice signed with the Washington Wizards. In the 2013 NBA Summer League, he twice registered the Summer League Sprite Dunk of the Day (July 14 and 19). Rice made his professional debut in the Wizards' seventh game of the season on November 12, 2013, against the Dallas Mavericks, making his only shot (a three-pointer) and adding a rebound. After Rice's debuted by playing the final 79 seconds of a loss that caused the Wizards to fall to 2–5, head coach Randy Wittman said he would probably shuffle the lineup. In the following game against San Antonio on November 13, Rice played 13 minutes and tallied 3 rebounds while registering his first NBA steal. On December 9, with Bradley Beal injured and Martell Webster sitting out, Rice who had totaled 11 points in his first 8 games, was given his first NBA start against Denver. Rice scored 7 points to go along with 3 rebounds and 3 steals. On December 18, Rice had an outpatient procedure in New York to repair a fractured right wrist suffered two days earlier. He was expected to miss 3–6 weeks.

On January 20, 2014, Rice was assigned to the Iowa Energy of the NBA D-League, in what was regarded more as a rehab assignment than a demotion. On January 28, 2014, he was recalled by the Wizards after averaging 24.3 points, 10.3 rebounds, 2.7 blocks and 2.0 steals in three NBADL games. On February 27, 2014, Rice was reassigned to the Iowa Energy. On April 5, he was recalled by the Wizards.

Following his first season, Rice was available to the Wizards on a team option for a salary of $816,000. Rice joined the team for the 2014 NBA Summer League, where he averaged a league-leading 25 points as well as 7.8 rebounds, 2.5 steals and 2.3 assists. He earned NBA All-Summer League 1st team (along with Wizards teammate Otto Porter) and NBA Summer League MVP recognition. One of his highlights was a game-tying three-point shot in double overtime of the Summer League playoff quarterfinal game. However, with the offseason acquisition of Paul Pierce, both Rice and Porter were expected to see limited minutes at small forward during the 2014–15 regular season. Rice was the recipient of what the league ruled was a November 4 groin strike by J. R. Smith that led to a one-game suspension for Smith. Rice had been called for a personal foul on the play in a game against the New York Knicks. On November 20, 2014, he was assigned to the Fort Wayne Mad Ants of the NBA Development League. On January 7, 2015, he was waived by the Wizards.

=== Return to Rio Grande Valley (2015) ===
On January 12, 2015, Rice was acquired by the Rio Grande Valley Vipers, returning to the team for a second stint.

=== TNT KaTropa (2017) ===
On August 15, 2017, Rice signed with TNT KaTropa of the Philippine Basketball Association as the team's import for the 2017 PBA Governors' Cup. His stint ended in disarray, as he was thrown out of TNT's do-or-die game against Barangay Ginebra in the semifinals after shoving Kevin Ferrer to the court then throwing the ball at him. On October 10, 2017, he left the country without talking to any team official. A day later, the team fined Rice $10,000 for "undesirable, unprofessional, unruly and unsportsmanlike behavior", adding to his P26,000 that the PBA docked from Rice for various infractions. Later that month, he sent a letter of apology to TNT management, in a reported attempt to gain TNT clearance for him to be able to play in another league.

=== Hapoel Holon (2017–2018) ===
On October 23, 2017, Rice signed with the Israeli team Hapoel Holon for the 2017–18 season. On November 18, 2017, Rice recorded a season-high 43 points and 11 rebounds, shooting 17-of-28 from the field in a 109–106 win over Maccabi Ashdod. On February 16, 2018, Rice recorded 28 points, 8 rebounds and 7 assists, including a game-winning shot with 1.6 seconds left in the 2018 Israeli Cup Final and led Holon to win its second Israeli Cup title after an 86–84 win over Maccabi Tel Aviv. Rice was subsequently named Final MVP. Three days later, Rice recorded 27 points, along with 12 rebounds and 7 assists, including a buzzer-beating shot after a missed free-throw to send the game into overtime, in a 102–97 win over Maccabi Rishon LeZion.

During his season with Holon, Rice led the league in scoring with 24.5 points and also averaged 7.9 rebounds, 4.7 assists and 1.9 steals per game. He was named two-time Israeli League Player of the Month (for games played in November and February) and four-time MVP of the Round.

On April 9, 2018, Rice was released by Holon due to disciplinary reasons, after punching his teammate Guy Pnini in the face in the locker room.

On June 8, 2018, Rice officially returned to Hapoel Holon for the 2018 Israeli League Final Four, where they eventually lost to Maccabi Tel Aviv.

=== Central and South America (2018–2019) ===
==== Caciques de Humacao (2018) ====
On June 26, 2018, Rice signed with Caciques de Humacao for the rest of the 2018 BSN season. However, he parted ways with the team after appearing in two games due to a back injury.

==== Aguacateros de Michoacán (2018) ====
On November 17, 2018, Rice returned to Mexico for a second stint, joining the Aguacateros de Michoacán. One day later, Rice recorded 34 points in his debut, shooting 12-of-21 from the field, along with 5 rebounds, 3 assists and 4 steals, leading the Aguacateros to a 94–89 win over Fuerza Regia de Monterrey.

==== Instituto Atlético Central Córdoba (2019) ====
On February 4, 2019, Rice signed with the Argentine team Instituto Atlético Central Córdoba. On March 1, Rice was ejected in a game against Bahía Basket for double technical fouls in less than three minutes of action. One day later, Rice parted ways with Instituto after appearing in five games.

==== Plaza Valerio (2019) ====
On March 9, 2019, Rice signed with Plaza Valerio of the Dominican Santiago League.

=== New Zealand Breakers (2019) ===
On November 5, 2019, Rice signed with the New Zealand Breakers of the Australian NBL as an injury replacement for Scotty Hopson. After appearing in two games for the Breakers, he was arrested on November 14 and charged with assault following an incident at an Auckland bar. Rice was subsequently suspended indefinitely by the Breakers, but was cleared to return to the roster on December 6 after sitting out three games following an investigation by Basketball Australia. He appeared in one game upon being reinstated, but on December 9, his contract was terminated after he was arrested for breaching his bail conditions the previous night. In his three games with the Breakers, Rice averaged 25 points per game.

=== Al-Fateh (2020) ===
In January 2020, Rice moved to Saudi Arabia to play for Al-Fateh.

=== Juventus Utena (2020) ===
On August 19, 2020, Rice signed with Juventus Utena of the Lithuanian Basketball League. Rice made his debut in a friendly game against Lithuanian champions BC Žalgiris, scoring 10 points and dishing out 4 assists in a 102–71 loss. Just a few days later, and spending a total of 10 days with the team, Juventus and Glen Rice Jr parted ways. Juventus managers reported that Rice had alcoholism problems and conflicted with his coaches, managers, and teammates (e.g., invited teammate Mindaugas Kupšas to fight outside after the practice due to his poor pass).

=== Maccabi Haifa (2021–22) ===
On December 3, 2021, Rice signed with Maccabi Haifa from the Israeli Basketball National League. On January 26, 2022, the club released Rice after hitting Ironi Ramat Gan player Ariel Tarotzki during a match the night before.

=== Power (2022) ===
On May 25, 2022, Rice was drafted by Power in the first round as the first overall pick of the 2022 BIG3 draft.

=== Hapoel Safed ===
On April 7, 2026 Rice officially Joined to Hapoel Safed. He finished his debut with 21 points.

== Career statistics ==
Legend
GP	Games played	GS	Games started	MPG	Minutes per game
FG%	Field goal percentage	3P%	3-point field goal percentage	FT%	Free throw percentage
RPG	Rebounds per game	APG	Assists per game	SPG	Steals per game
BPG	Blocks per game	PPG	Points per game	**Bold**	Career high

=== NBA ===
==== Regular season ====
Year	Team	GP	GS	MPG	FG%	3P%	FT%	RPG	APG	SPG	BPG	PPG
2013–14	Washington	**11**	**1**	**9.9**	**.297**	**.294**	**.714**	**1.8**	**.6**	**.5**	**.1**	**2.9**
2014–15	Washington	5	0	8.6	.200	.143	.667	.8	.4	.0	.0	2.2
Career		16	1	9.5	.269	.250	.692	1.5	.6	.4	.1	2.7

=== NBA D-League ===
==== Regular season ====
Year	Team	GP	GS	MPG	FG%	3P%	FT%	RPG	APG	SPG	BPG	PPG
2012–13	Rio Grande Valley	**42**	**25**	23.7	**.491**	**.385**	.752	6.2	1.9	.9	.7	13.0
2013–14	Iowa	19	19	**27.9**	.464	.351	**.805**	6.2	1.9	**1.7**	**.8**	**17.2**
Career		61	44	25.0	.481	.372	.773	6.2	1.9	1.1	.8	14.3

==== Playoffs ====
Year	Team	GP	GS	MPG	FG%	3P%	FT%	RPG	APG	SPG	BPG	PPG
2013	Rio Grande Valley	6	6	39.2	.473	.358	.692	9.5	4.3	2.0	2.0	25.0
Career		6	6	39.2	.473	.358	.692	9.5	4.3	2.0	2.0	25.0

== Personal life ==
Rice is the son of Glen Rice Sr. and Tracey Starwood. Glen Rice Sr. was the all-time leading scorer for Michigan who led the 1988–89 Wolverines to the National Championship, played 15 seasons in the NBA, and was a member of the 1999–2000 Los Angeles Lakers championship team. Rice has a younger brother name G'mitri. On October 25, 2015, Rice was shot in the leg at an Atlanta restaurant and was later charged with reckless conduct and possession of 240.4 grams (0.53 lb) marijuana. In December 2015, he appeared in season 8 of The Real Housewives of Atlanta. On July 28, 2016, Rice was arrested for battery.
