= Joe Alexander =

American basketball player (born 1986)

Joe Alexander ג'ו אלכסנדר
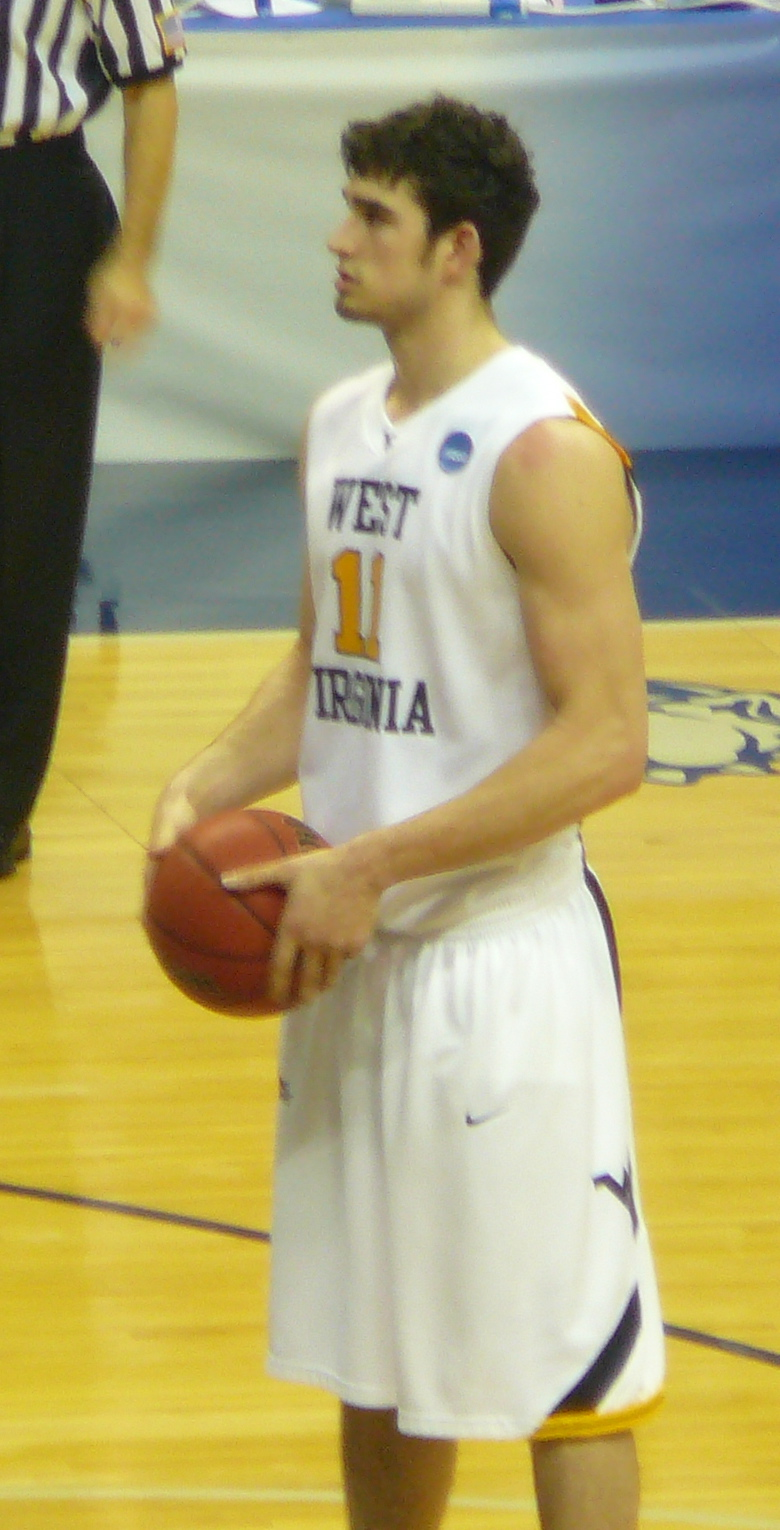
- Alexander with West Virginia in March 2008

Personal information
- Born: December 26, 1986 (age 39) Kaohsiung, Taiwan
- Listed height: 6 ft 8 in (2.03 m)
- Listed weight: 220 lb (100 kg)

Career information
- High school: Linganore (Frederick, Maryland)
- College: West Virginia (2005–2008)
- NBA draft: 2008: 1st round, 8th overall pick
- Drafted by: Milwaukee Bucks
- Playing career: 2008–2023
- Position: Power forward
- Number: 11, 20

Career history
- 2008–2010: Milwaukee Bucks
- 2010: →Fort Wayne Mad Ants
- 2010: Chicago Bulls
- 2010–2011: Texas Legends
- 2011: Krasnye Krylya Samara
- 2013–2014: Santa Cruz Warriors
- 2014–2015: Maccabi Tel Aviv
- 2015–2016: Dinamo Sassari
- 2016–2017: Maccabi Tel Aviv
- 2017–2018: Hapoel Holon
- 2018–2019: Beşiktaş
- 2019: ESSM Le Portel
- 2019–2020: Hapoel Holon
- 2020–2021: Ironi Nahariya
- 2021: Jeonju KCC Egis
- 2021: Hapoel Holon
- 2021: Maccabi Rishon LeZion
- 2023: Maccabi Haifa
- 2023: Hapoel Jerusalem

Career highlights
- 3× Israeli Cup winner (2015, 2017, 2018); All-Israeli League First Team (2018); All-NBA D-League First Team (2011); First-team All-Big East (2007); AP Honorable Mention All-American (2007)
- Stats at NBA.com
- Stats at Basketball Reference

Joseph Anthony Alexander (Hebrew: ג'ו אלכסנדר; born December 26, 1986) is a Taiwan-born American-Israeli former professional basketball player. Alexander, at 6 ft 8 in (2.03 m) played both forward positions, was selected for the 2007 All-Big East squad during his collegiate career with West Virginia and was an All-American Honorable Mention. He was selected eighth overall in the 2008 NBA draft by the Milwaukee Bucks, and became the first Taiwanese-born NBA player.

== Early life and education ==
Born in Kaohsiung, Taiwan, Alexander moved to Silver Spring, Maryland, when he was two. When he was eight, his family relocated to China when his father got a job working for Nestlé.

His maternal grandfather was Jewish, which made him eligible for Israeli citizenship while playing for Maccabi Tel Aviv.

Alexander lived in Hong Kong for six months and then in mainland China for six years, becoming conversant in Mandarin. While Alexander lived in Hong Kong, he attended the Hong Kong International School in Tai Tam. Alexander and his family lived in a separated ex-pat community with other Americans in Beijing. There he attended the International School of Beijing from 1996 to 2002, where he first became acquainted with basketball. His brothers, John and Jeremy, became the first foreigners to win the Beijing High School basketball MVP award and did so in successive seasons. In 2010, the ISB Dragons basketball team officially retired Alexander's jersey in an elaborate ceremony in the school gym, a ceremony where Alexander himself was present.

Alexander then returned to the U.S. to live in Mount Airy, Maryland, where he spent his junior and senior seasons playing for Linganore High School. While he only played a minor role coming off the bench his junior year, his senior season he boasted averages of 14.8 points, 7.0 rebounds and 2.8 assists per game, which earned him first-team Monocacy Valley Athlete League Chesapeake conference honors. Alexander was named team captain his senior year and selected to the Frederick County all-star first team. He was named Mt. Airy Gazette player of the year, 2004 Frederick Gazette player of the year, earned first-team honors from the Frederick Gazette and Frederick News Post, and was on The Washington Post's honorable mention all-Met team. Alexander also set school records for blocks in a season (90) and season field-goal percentage (58.0).

After high school, Alexander gained only limited attention from Division III schools (including Washington College, where his brothers were playing) and some Division II programs despite having a good senior season. At that point, Alexander was 6 ft 6 in (1.98 m) and only 170 lb (77 kg); a Division I athletic scholarship was out of the question.

Determined to make his dream a reality, he opted to attend Hargrave Military Academy in Chatham, Virginia. Playing behind Pitt star Sam Young and Villanova's Shane Clark, Alexander saw limited playing time while at Hargrave.

== College career ==
=== Freshman season ===
Alexander enrolled at West Virginia University in 2005 after attending Hargrave Military Academy for the 2004–2005 season. As a freshman, he played in 10 games, while starters Kevin Pittsnogle and Mike Gansey led the starting senior class. On November 13, 2005, Alexander scored his first collegiate basket against Wofford. His best game his freshman year was against Washington & Jefferson College where he scored five points and blocked five shots on December 3.

=== Sophomore season ===
Alexander finally started in the 2006–2007 season. Against DePaul on January 28, 2007, Alexander posted a career-high 23 points. With 90 seconds left in the game, West Virginia led 61–48 after Alexander's shot-clock-beating 3-pointer and a three-point play. But from what looked to be a good season, Alexander's season declined in the second half. After an 11-point performance versus Providence on February 2, Alexander went without scoring over double-digits for the rest of the regular season and the Big East tournament. Alexander also only totaled 18 points in the Mountaineers' NIT run, which ended with a championship win over Clemson on March 29. Alexander scored no points and grabbed one rebound in 16 minutes. His performances included a 4-point game in a 74–50 victory over Delaware State on March 13, a 3-point game in a 71–66 win over North Carolina State on March 20, a 2-point game in a 63–62 win over Mississippi State on March 27. He averaged 10.3 points per game, 1.9 assists per game, and 4.3 rebounds per game for the season.

=== Junior season ===
After the NIT championship, head coach John Beilein left the team for the head coaching job at Michigan. Afterwards, West Virginia alumnus Bob Huggins left Kansas State for the head coaching job at WVU. Huggins emphasizes strength training and as a result Alexander went from 210 pounds to 230 pounds and has often remarked that the training allowed him to avoid fatigue and weight loss.

In the season-opening exhibition game against Mountain State, Alexander scored 19 points, grabbed 6 rebounds, totaled 5 blocks, and had one steal in the 88–65 win. In the 75–61 victory over New Mexico State, Alexander scored 16 points and grabbed 10 rebounds. The next game, a victory over UMES, Alexander scored 22 points with 8 rebounds. In the 70–53 victory over Winthrop, Alexander scored 19 points and again grabbed 10 rebounds. Alexander then scored 17 points in the victory over Auburn and a then career-high 26 points over Duquesne. Alexander scored 20 points and grabbed 8 rebounds against Maryland-Baltimore County on December 15, then followed up with 20 points and 6 rebounds against Canisius on December 22, 2007. In the 88–82 loss to Oklahoma on December 29, Alexander scored 21 points and grabbed 7 rebounds, and in the loss to Notre Dame he only scored 9 points. He then put up 19 points, 4 rebounds, and 5 assists in the victory over Marquette on January 6, 2008. However, in the January 10 loss to Louisville, Alexander scored 22 points, including 14 straight in the second half. In the 73–64 victory over St. John's on January 17, he scored 15 points.

After dealing with injuries, Alexander bounced back on February 2, 2008, with 19 points and 8 rebounds in West Virginia's 77–65 away win against Providence. On February 14 in the 81–63 victory against Rutgers, Alexander totaled 15 points and 9 rebounds. Then in the 89–68 victory against Seton Hall on February 17, he registered 13 points and 9 rebounds. In the 78–56 loss to Villanova on February 20, Alexander scored 11 points with 4 rebounds and 3 assists. In the February 23 home game versus Providence, Alexander scored 21 points and grabbed 7 rebounds in West Virginia's 80–53 win. In the 85–73 victory over DePaul on February 27, Alexander scored 17 points to reach the 20-win mark for the season. In the 79–71 loss to Connecticut on March 1, he scored a career-high 32 points and added 10 rebounds for his third double-double of the season. The following game, on March 3, a 76–62 home victory over Pittsburgh, Alexander tied his career-high of 32 points (on 10 of 16 field goals) set the previous game and also added 6 rebounds. He began his performance with his team up 40–30, when he scored six consecutive points to raise the score to 47–30 in the second half. Alexander finished the regular season in the 83–74 overtime victory over St. John's at Madison Square Garden on March 8 with 29 points and 10 rebounds, including 7 in the extra period. For his efforts on the season—averaging team-highs of 16.2 points and 6.1 rebounds per game—Alexander was named to the first-team All-Big East squad. He was the sixth Mountaineer in school history to earn first-team All-Big East honors.

In the start of the Big East tournament, the Mountaineers beat Providence again, 58–53. Alexander contributed with 22 points and 6 rebounds. In the second round of the tourney, the Mountaineers upset the #15-ranked Connecticut Huskies on March 13, 78–72. Alexander contributed with a career-high 34 points, the most ever by a Mountaineer in a Big East championship. He also added 7 rebounds. The game marked his third 30-point game of the season. However, as the Mountaineers lost in the semifinal matchup against the No. 8 Georgetown Hoyas, Alexander finished the Big East tournament with 12 points on 5-of-16 shooting, and 5 rebounds.

The Mountaineers' run to the semifinal round of the Big East Tourney propelled the team to a #7 seed in the NCAA tournament, with a first-round matchup against the #10 seed Arizona Wildcats. ESPN, in their West region breakdown, named Alexander the best player in the region next to UCLA's Kevin Love. In the first-round victory over Arizona, Alexander scored 14 points and grabbed 8 rebounds. In the second-round victory over the #2-seed Duke Blue Devils, he scored 22 points and grabbed 11 rebounds as the Mountaineers won 73–67. In the Sweet 16 75–79 overtime loss to No. 3 Xavier on March 27, Alexander scored 18 points and grabbed 10 rebounds for his second double-double of the tournament.

Alexander finished his junior season leading the team with 16.9 points per game and 6.4 rebounds per game. Alexander was second on the team with 1.5 blocks per game and third with 2.4 assists per game and 31.6 minutes played per game. He finished the NCAA Tournament by averaging 18 points and 9.6 rebounds per game.

== Professional career ==
=== Milwaukee Bucks (2008–2010) ===
On April 9, 2008, Alexander declared himself eligible for the 2008 NBA draft, and later signed with an agent, forfeiting his remaining college eligibility. Alexander was described as the best athlete on paper at the draft overall, by having the second-most number of 185-pound bench reps (24), the second-highest max touch (12' ½") and the second-fastest three-quarter sprint time (2.99 seconds). He was drafted 8th overall in the NBA draft by the Milwaukee Bucks in June, and was signed by the team on July 8. In the 2008 NBA Summer League, Alexander averaged 9.2 points, 3.6 rebounds and 1.2 blocks per game while starting all five games. In a December 7, 2008 Bucks loss to the Lakers, Alexander led the team in scoring with 15 points. Following the All-Star break, Alexander saw a streak of four consecutive games where he did not play. However, he rebounded in a loss to the Miami Heat by totaling 13 points, 5 rebounds and 5 assists in 20 minutes of playing time. He averaged 5.8 points for the month of January, the most of his rookie season in a month. In a March 30, 2009 win over the New Jersey Nets, Alexander scored a career-high 16 points. Alexander finished the season averaging 4.7 points in his 12.1 minutes per game.

In the offseason prior to the 2009–2010 season, starting forward Richard Jefferson was traded to the San Antonio Spurs, potentially freeing up playing time for Alexander.

On October 30, 2009, the Bucks declined Alexander's rookie contract option that would have added a third season to his rookie contract.

After missing time because of a hamstring injury, Alexander was assigned to the NBA D-League's Fort Wayne Mad Ants on January 20, 2010.

=== Chicago Bulls (2010) ===
On February 18, 2010, Alexander was traded to the Chicago Bulls along with Hakim Warrick for John Salmons.

=== New Orleans Hornets (2010) ===
On September 20, 2010, Alexander signed with the New Orleans Hornets, but he was waived on November 13, 2010.

=== Texas Legends (2010–2011) ===
On November 26, Alexander was signed by the NBA D-League's Texas Legends. He had a successful 2010–11 season with the Legends averaging 20.2 points and 8.9 rebounds per game and was awarded a spot at the D-League's 2011 All-Star game. He was in an Atlanta Hawks minicamp before the 2011 NBA lockout occurred.

In June 2011, Alexander was listed as one of the NBA's "Biggest Draft Busts" by the New York Daily News, due to his struggles to transition from college to the NBA.

=== Krasnye Krylia (2011) ===
In July 2011, Alexander signed with BC Krasnye Krylya Samara of Russia. He left in December 2011, after an X-ray revealed Alexander had a stress fracture in his left tibia. After a sabbatical year hoping the injury would heal itself, Alexander opted to fix his tibia through surgery in 2012.

=== Santa Cruz Warriors (2013–2014) ===
On September 27, 2013, Alexander signed with the Golden State Warriors. On October 25, 2013, Alexander was waived by the Warriors. The reason was a magnetic resonance imaging showed his leg was not fully recovered yet. Instead Alexander was signed by team's D-League affiliate, the Santa Cruz Warriors, where treatment was administered to both his leg and overall muscle performance. A recovered Alexander played 13 games for Santa Cruz in the 2013–14 regular season. In the playoffs, Alexander appeared in 4 games through the Warriors' D-League runners-up campaign.

In November 2014, he was reacquired by Santa Cruz. Alexander played 13 games through the 2014–15 NBA Development League season.

=== Maccabi Tel Aviv (2014–2015) ===
On December 25, 2014, Alexander left Santa Cruz and signed with Maccabi Tel Aviv of the Israeli Premier League and the Euroleague for the rest of the season. Alexander won the 2015 Israeli State Cup with Maccabi, as well as reaching the 2015 EuroLeague Quarterfinals, where they eventually were eliminated by Fenerbahçe.

=== Dinamo Sassari (2015–2016) ===
On August 3, 2015, Alexander signed a one-year deal with the Italian club Dinamo Sassari. On January 24, 2016, Alexander recorded a season-high 27 points, shooting 11-of-15 from the field, along with four rebounds and two steals in a 78–86 loss to Red October Cantù. In 47 games played during the 2015–16 season, he averaged 12 points, 4.4 rebounds and 1 assist per game.

=== Return to Maccabi (2016–2017) ===
On August 3, 2016, Alexander returned to Maccabi Tel Aviv for a second stint, signing a one-year deal with an option for another one. On May 6, 2017, Alexander recorded a season-high 25 points, shooting 10-of-11 from the field, along with three rebounds and two assists in an 88–74 win over Maccabi Rishon LeZion. Alexander won the 2017 Israeli State Cup title with Maccabi.

=== Hapoel Holon (2017–2018) ===
On July 22, 2017, Alexander signed with Hapoel Holon for the 2017–18 season. On November 12, 2017, Alexander recorded a then career-high 29 points, shooting 12-of-16 from the field, in a 104–74 win over Maccabi Rishon LeZion. On November 30, 2017, Alexander was named Israeli Player of the Month for games played in November. On May 3, 2018, Alexander recorded a career-high 34 points, shooting 13-of-20 from the field, along with 8 rebounds in an 81–75 win over Hapoel Eilat. He was subsequently named Israeli League Round 28 MVP.

Alexander won the 2018 Israeli State Cup title with Holon, as well as reaching the 2018 Israeli League Final, where they eventually were lost to his former team Maccabi Tel Aviv. In 50 games played during the 2017–18 season, he averaged 13.8 points, 5.2 rebounds, 1.4 assists and 1.4 blocks per game. On June 8, 2018, Alexander earned a spot in the All-Israeli League First Team.

=== Beşiktaş (2018–2019) ===
On August 24, 2018, Alexander signed a one-year deal with Beşiktaş of the Turkish Basketball Super League. On April 21, 2019, Alexander recorded a season-high 26 points, shooting 10-of-19 from the field, along with eight rebounds in a 67–76 loss to Teksüt Bandırma. In 31 games played for Beşiktaş, he averaged 9.5 points and 4.3 rebounds, shooting 44.5 percent from three-point range.

=== ESSM Le Portel (2019) ===
On November 11, 2019, Alexander signed with ESSM Le Portel of the French LNB Pro A. On December 23, 2019, he parted ways with Le Portel after appearing in five games.

=== Return to Hapoel Holon (2019–2020) ===
On December 29, 2019, Alexander returned to Hapoel Holon for a second stint, signing for the rest of the season.

=== Ironi Nahariya (2020–2021) ===
On August 13, 2020, Alexander signed with Ironi Nahariya of the Israeli Premier League.

=== Jeonju KCC Egis (2021) ===
On March 25, 2021, Alexander signed with Jeonju KCC Egis of the Korean Basketball League.

=== Third stint with Hapoel Holon (2021) ===
On May 24, 2021, Alexander signed for the third time with Hapoel Holon.

=== Maccabi Rishon LeZion (2021–2022) ===
On October 11, 2021, Alexander signed with Maccabi Rishon LeZion.

== The Basketball Tournament (TBT) ==
In the summer of 2017, Alexander played in The Basketball Tournament on ESPN for The Stickmen. He competed for the $2 million prize, and for The Stickmen, he averaged 6.0 points per game. Alexander helped take The Stickmen to the second round of the tournament, where they then lost to Team Challenge ALS, 87–73.

== Career statistics ==
Legend
GP	Games played	GS	Games started	MPG	Minutes per game
FG%	Field-goal percentage	3P%	3-point field-goal percentage	FT%	Free-throw percentage
RPG	Rebounds per game	APG	Assists per game	SPG	Steals per game
BPG	Blocks per game	PPG	Points per game	PIR	Performance index rating
**Bold**	Career high

=== NBA ===
==== Regular season ====
Year	Team	GP	GS	MPG	FG%	3P%	FT%	RPG	APG	SPG	BPG	PPG
2008–09	Milwaukee	**59**	0	**12.1**	**.416**	**.348**	**.699**	**1.9**	**.7**	**.3**	**.5**	**4.7**
2009–10	Chicago	8	0	3.6	.167	.000	.667	.6	.3	.1	.1	.5
Career		67	0	11.1	.410	.340	.698	1.8	.7	.2	.4	4.2

=== Euroleague ===
Year	Team	GP	GS	MPG	FG%	3P%	FT%	RPG	APG	SPG	BPG	PPG	PIR
2014–15	Maccabi	15	0	11.9	.472	.412	.917	2.2	.5	.1	.4	4.5	3.9
2015–16	Sassari	9	4	26.5	.366	.304	.862	4.9	.8	.4	1.4	10.9	9.6
2016–17	Maccabi	17	5	11.0	.474	.636	.778	1.5	.4	.2	.2	3.8	2.9
Career		15	0	11.9	.472	.412	.917	2.2	.5	.1	.4	4.5	3.9

== See also ==
- List of select Jewish basketball players
