= Liga Artzit (basketball) =

Israeli 3rd basketball league

- Sport: Basketball
- Founded: 1957; 69 years ago
- No. of teams: 28 (Two districts)
- Country: Israel
- Continent: FIBA Europe
- Most recent champions: Maccabi Haifa (North); Maccabi Ashdod (South)
- Level on pyramid: 3rd Tier (Israel)
- Promotion to: Liga Leumit
- Relegation to: Liga Alef
- Domestic cup: Association Cup
- Website: ibasketball.co.il

Liga Artzit (Hebrew: ליגה ארצית. Artzit) is the third tier level league of basketball competition in Israel. It is the league level that is below the second tier level Liga Leumit.

Until the 1991-92 season it was the second tier level league of basketball competition in Israel.

== League system ==
The league contains 14 clubs (in two districts), which compete in a home-and-away round-robin. At the end of the season, the first team from each district (South/North) is promoted to the Liga Leumit.

The three teams that finish at the bottom of the table are relegated to the fourth tier, Liga Alef.

== Promoted ==
| Season | North champion | South champion | Other Promoted ['s] |
|---|---|---|---|
| 1992/1993 | Hapoel Haifa | | |
| 1993/1994 | Hapoel Safed | Ironi Ra'anana | |
| 1994/1995 | Maccabi Karmiel | Elitzur Rishon LeZion | |
| 1995/1996 | Hapoel Afula | Maccabi Rehovot | |
| 1996/1997 | Maccabi Haifa | Ironi Ashkelon | Beitar Migdal ha-Emek; Elitzur Bat Yam |
| 1997/1998 | Hapoel Beit Eli'ezer | Maccabi Ashdod | |
| 1998/1999 | Elitzur Kiryat Ata | Elitzur Ramla | |
| 1999/2000 | Hapoel Nahariya | Ironi Kiryat Ono | Hapoel Lev HaSharon |
| 2000/2001 | Maccabi Hod HaSharon | | |
| 2001/2002 | Maccabi Kiryat Bialik | Hapoel Kfar Saba | |
| 2002/2003 | Hapoel Migdal ha-Emek | Hapoel Holon | |
| 2003/2004 | Hapoel Yarka | B.C. Ramat Ef'al | |
| 2004/2005 | Barak Netanya | Hapoel Giv'atayim | Beitar Binyamina; Maccabi Hod HaSharon |
| 2005/2006 | Hapoel Nazareth Illit | Hapoel Be'er Sheva | Hapeol Yokneam/Megiddo |
| 2006/2007 | Maccabi Haifa | Elitzur Yavne | |
| 2007/2008 | Elitzur Kokhav Ya'ir | Ironi Ness Ziona | Hapoel Kiryat Tiv'on; Hapoel Kfar Saba; Hapoel Be'eri |
| 2008/2009 | Hapoel Haifa | Maccabi Be'er Ya'akov | |
| 2009/2010 | Hapoel Ussishkin | Maccabi Petah Tikva | |
| 2010/2011 | Ironi Kiryat Ata | Ironi Ness Ziona | |
| 2011/2012 | Maccabi Kiryat Bialik | Maccabi Kiryat Gat | Hapoel Galil Elyon |
| 2012/2013 | Hapoel Migdal ha-Emek | A.S. Ramat HaSharon | |
| 2013/2014 | Ironi Ra'anana | Maccabi Kiryat Gat | |
| 2014/2015 | Hapoel Ramat Gan Givatayim | Hapoel Be'er Sheva | |
| 2015/2016 | Hapoel Haifa | Maccabi Rehovot | |
| 2016/2017 | Maccabi Kiryat Motzkin | Elitzur Yavne | |
| 2017/2018 | Elitzur Netanya | Elitzur Eito Ashkelon | |
| 2018/2019 | A.S. Ramat HaSharon | Hapoel Hevel Modi'in | |
| 2019/2020 | Hapoel Acre/Mateh Asher | Maccabi Ironi Ramat Gan | |
| 2020/2021 | Hapoel Migdal ha-Emek | Maccabi Ma'ale Adumim | |
| 2021/2022 | Elitzur Shomron | Maccabi Rehovot | |
| 2022/2023 | F.C. Safed | Hapoel Bnei Kafr Qasim | |
| 2023/2024 | Hapoel Migdal ha-Emek | Elitzur Yavne | Hapoel Kfar Saba |
| 2024/2025 | Maccabi Haifa | Maccabi Ashdod/Gederot | A.S. Ashkelon/Kiryat Gat; Maccabi Elitzur Petah Tikva; Maccabi Ma'ale Adumim |
| 2025/2026 | Maccabi Kiryat Motzkin | Hapoel Hevel Modi'in | |

== Current teams ==
=== North ===
| Team | City | Arena | Capacity |
|---|---|---|---|
| Hapoel Kfar Saba | Kfar Saba | Hayovel Hall | 680 |
| Hapoel Kfar Saba/Kokhav Ya'ir | Kfar Saba and Kokhav Ya'ir–Tsur Yig'al | Hayovel Hall | 680 |
| Hapoel Megiddo | Megiddo Regional Council | Mishmar HaEmek Sports Hall | 1,000 |
| Hapoel Nof HaGalil | Nof HaGalil | HaPais Alon Sports Hall | 350 |
| Hapoel Tel Aviv "Uri" | Tel Aviv | Ironi Tet High School Sport Hall | 250 |
| Hapoel Tiberias | Tiberias | Yeshiva High School | 250 |
| Ironi Elizur Givatayim | Givatayim | Telem Sport Hall | 473 |
| Ironi Kiryat Ono "Shikko" | Kiryat Ono | Sport Hall School Alumim | 500 |
| Maccabi Hadera | Hadera | Enerbox Ha'pais Toto | 2,582 |
| Maccabi Haifa | Haifa | Romema Arena | 5,000 |
| Maccabi Hod HaSharon | Hod HaSharon | Atidim Sports Hall | 400 |
| Maccabi Ironi Karmiel | Karmiel | Horowitz Hall | 498 |
| Maccabi Kiryat Bialik | Kiryat Bialik | Matnas Givat HaRakafot | 200 |
| S.C. Zafed | Zafed | HaPais Hall Zafed | 608 |

=== South ===
| Team | City | Arena | Capacity |
|---|---|---|---|
| Elitzur Neve David Ramla | Ramla | Kiryat Menacham Sport Hall | 2,000 |
| Hapoel Be'er Tuvia | Be'er Tuvia | Be'er Tuvia High School Sports Hall | 400 |
| Hapoel Brenner | Brenner Regional Council | Beit Or School Hall | 250 |
| Hapoel Gezer/Na'an/Netzer Sereni | Gezer Regional Council, Netzer Sereni and Na'an | Na'an Basketball Hall | 500 |
| Hapoel Hevel Eilot | Hevel Eilot Regional Council | Yotvata Sport Hall | 600 |
| Maccabi Ma'ale Adumim | Ma'ale Adumim | HaPais Hall Ma'ale Adumim | 498 |
| Hapoel Mateh Yehuda | Mateh Yehuda Regional Council | HaRotev High School, Tzora | 250 |
| Hapoel Netzer Sereni Arik/Gezer | Netzer Sereni and Gezer Regional Council | Netzer Sereni Sport Hall | 250 |
| Hapoel Petah Tikva | Petah Tikva | Uzi Hitman School Sports Hall | 380 |
| Hapoel Ramat Gan Givatayim | Ramat Gan and Givatayim | Ort Ebin Sport Hall | 450 |
| B.C. Kiryat Malachi | Kiryat Malachi | Country Club Kiryat Malachi | 500 |
| Maccabi Be'er Ya'akov | Be'er Ya'akov | Max Center | 450 |
| Maccabi Dimona | Dimona | Noam Haim Sport Hall | 650 |
| Maccabi Tel Aviv/Shoham | Tel Aviv and Shoham | Nitzanim Sport Hall | 500 |
