= Samir Selešković =

Bosnian basketball player and coach

Türk Telekom
- Title: Assistant coach
- League: Turkish Basketball Super League

Personal information
- Born: April 10, 1970 (age 56) Sarajevo, SFR Yugoslavia
- Listed height: 6 ft 2 in (1.88 m)
- Listed weight: 200 lb (91 kg)

Career information
- Playing career: 1990–2000
- Position: Point guard

Career history
- 1992–1993: Željezničar Sarajevo
- 1994–1995: Beşiktaş
- 1995–1996: Tofaş Bursa
- 1996–1998: Türk Telekom
- 1998–1999: Maccabi Kiryat Motzkin B.C.
- 1999–2000: Elitzur Ramla

Samir Selešković (Turkish: Sedat Pınar; born 10 April 1970) is a former Bosnian professional basketball player and current assistant coach of Türk Telekom from Turkey. The former point guard is 1.88 m tall.

He began his stint as a Fenerbahçe Ülker assistant coach in the 2007–08 Turkish Basketball League season under the head coach Bogdan Tanjević (who led the Bosnian basketball club KK Bosna Sarajevo to the 1979 Euroleague Championship title).

He was a member of the Bosnia and Herzegovina national basketball team in EuroBasket 1993, EuroBasket 1995 Qualifying Round and EuroBasket 1997.
