= Quintrell Thomas =

American basketball player

Personal information
- Born: February 21, 1990 (age 36) New York City, New York, U.S.
- Listed height: 6 ft 8 in (2.03 m)
- Listed weight: 245 lb (111 kg)

Career information
- High school: St. Patrick (Elizabeth, New Jersey)
- College: Kansas (2008–2009); UNLV (2010–2013)
- NBA draft: 2013: undrafted
- Playing career: 2013–present
- Position: Power forward / center

Career history
- 2013–2014: Kirovgrad
- 2014–2016: Interclube
- 2016–2017: Al-Hilal
- 2017: Al-Ittihad Jeddah
- 2018: Oliveirense
- 2018–2019: Maccabi Hod HaSharon
- 2019–2020: Ironi Kiryat Ata
- 2020–2021: Al Khor
- 2021: Maccabi Ra'anana
- 2021–2022: Nardò
- 2022–2023: Defensor Sporting
- 2023: Força Lleida

Career highlights
- All-Israeli National League First Team (2019); Portuguese League champion (2018); Portuguese Supercup champion (2018); Saudi Premier League champion (2017); Ukrainian Higher League champion (2014)

Quintrell Daron Thomas (born February 21, 1990) is an American professional basketball player. He played college basketball for the University of Kansas and the University of Nevada in Las Vegas before playing professionally in Ukraine, Angola, Saudi Arabia, Portugal, Israel and Qatar.

== Early life and college career ==
Thomas was born in New York City, New York. He attended St. Patrick High School in Elizabeth, New Jersey, where he averaged 16 points, 10 rebounds, two blocks and two steals per game as a senior. Thomas was named his team's MVP.

Thomas started his college basketball career at the University of Kansas, where he played in 26 games and made one start, averaging 1.5 points and 2.0 rebounds per game. On July 7, 2009, Thomas transferred from Kansas to the University of Nevada in Las Vegas, but sat out the 2009–10 season at UNLV per NCAA Transfer rules. Thomas played three years at UNLV, where he averaged 3.6 points and 3.5 rebounds in 12.4 minutes per game in his senior year.

== Professional career ==
After going undrafted in the 2013 NBA draft, he started his professional career with Kirovgrad of the Ukrainian Basketball Higher League, where he became the second best scorer in the League. Thomas averaged an impressive 19.8 points and 10.5 rebounds per game, leading his team to win the Ukrainian Higher League championship title.

On October 24, 2014, Thomas signed with G.D. Interclube of Angolan Basketball League, where he finished his second season with Interclube as the league best rebounder (10.4 rebounds per game) and the second-leading scorer (17.1 points per game), while shooting 52.4% from the field and 82.3% from the free throw line.

On December 24, 2016, Thomas signed with Al-Hilal of the Saudi Premier League, where he led the league in rebounds with 12.7 per game, to go with 24.1 points, 2.4 assists, and 1.3 blocked shots per game. In April 2017, he joined Al-Ittihad for the rest of the season. Thomas won the 2017 Saudi Premier League championship, leading his team in scoring and rebounding during the Playoffs.

On March 1, 2018, Thomas signed with U.D. Oliveirense of the Portuguese Basketball League. In 22 games played for Oliveirense, he averaged 12 points, 7.2 rebounds and 1 block per game. Thomas won the 2018 Portuguese League Championship title with Oliveirense.

On August 9, 2018, Thomas signed a one-year deal with Maccabi Hod HaSharon of the Israeli National League. In 30 games played during the 2018–19 season, he led the league in scoring (23.5), rebounding (12.1) and efficiency rating (29.3) per game. On April 7, 2019, Thomas earned a spot in the Israeli National League First-Team.

On July 4, 2019, Thomas signed with Ironi Kiryat Ata for the 2019–20 season. He averaged 18.2 points, 12.1 rebounds and 1.2 assists per game. On October 8, 2020, Thomas signed with Al Khor of the Qatari Basketball League. In July 2021, Quintrell Thomas signed a contract with Next Nardò of the Serie A2
