= Jarmar Gulley =

American basketball player

No. 15 – Gaziantep Basketbol
- Position: Shooting guard / small forward
- League: TBL

Personal information
- Born: March 12, 1991 (age 35) Beaumont, Texas, U.S.
- Listed height: 6 ft 5 in (1.96 m)
- Listed weight: 218 lb (99 kg)

Career information
- High school: Central (Beaumont, Texas)
- College: Highland CC (2009–2011); Missouri State (2011–2014)
- NBA draft: 2014: undrafted
- Playing career: 2014–present

Career history
- 2014–2018: Musel Pikes
- 2018–2019: Maccabi Ra'anana
- 2019–2020: Hapoel Gilboa Galil
- 2020–2021: Darüşşafaka
- 2021–2022: Gaziantep
- 2022–2024: Zhejiang Golden Bulls
- 2024–2025: Shandong Hi-Speed Kirin
- 2025–2026: Jilin Northeast Tigers
- 2026: Trabzonspor
- 2026–present: Gaziantep

Career highlights
- Turkish Basketball League Scoring Leader (2022); Israeli National League Best Import (2019); All-Israeli National League First-team (2019); Second-team All-MVC (2014)

Jarmar Otis Gulley (born March 12, 1991) is an American professional basketball player for Gaziantep Basketbol of the Türkiye Basketbol Ligi (TBL). He played college basketball for Highland CC and Missouri State before playing professionally in Luxembourg, Israel, and Turkey. Standing at 6 ft 5 in (1.96 m), he plays at the shooting guard and small forward positions.

== Early life and college career ==
Gulley attended Central High School in Beaumont, Texas, where he averaged 18 points, 6 rebounds, 3 assists and 2 blocked shots a game in his senior year. Gulley was also the co-MVP of Texas District 20 in Class 4A and also earned all-conference honors as a junior and was a three-year starter for the Jaguars.

Gulley started his college basketball at Highland Community College in Highland, Kansas, where he averaged 23.1 points, 5.8 rebounds, 2.3 assists and 2.2 steals per game in his sophomore year. Gulley earned NJCAA Division II first-team All-America honors in 2010–11 after helping Coach Scotties to a 22–14 record and Region VI title.

On April 15, 2011, Gulley signed national letter of intent to attend Missouri State. In his senior year, he averaged 14.3 points, 6.3 rebounds, 1.5 assists and 1.5 steals per game, earning a spot in the second-team All-Missouri Valley Conference.

== Professional career ==
=== Musel Pikes (2014–2018) ===
On August 5, 2014, Gulley signed his professional contract with the Musel Pikes of Luxembourg's Total League.

On December 8, 2017, Gulley recorded a double-double of 11 rebounds and a career-high 50 points, shooting 18–24 from the field and 9-of-10 from three-point range, along with eight steals and two assists in a 106–74 win over US Heffingen. In 27 games played during the 2017–18 season, he averaged 25.9 points, 8.7 rebounds, 3.0 assists and 2.2 steals per game, while shooting 42.2 percent from three-point range.

=== Maccabi Ra'anana (2018–2019) ===
On July 15, 2018, Gulley signed a one-year deal with Maccabi Ra'anana of the Israeli National League. In 31 games played for Ra'anana, he finished the season as the league second-leading scorer (23.7 points per game) and second in efficiency rating (24.6 per game), to go with 6.5 rebounds, 4.9 assists and 2.6 steals per game. Gulley led Ra'anana to the 2019 Israeli National League Semifinals, where they eventually were eliminated by Maccabi Haifa.

On April 5, 2019, Gulley earned the Israeli National League Regular Season Best Import and the All-National League First Team honors.

=== Hapoel Gilboa Galil (2019–2020) ===
On July 17, 2019, Gulley signed a one-year deal with Hapoel Gilboa Galil of the Israeli Premier League. On October 27, 2019, Gully recorded 26 points, 5 rebounds, 5 assists and 3 steals, including a three-pointer at the buzzer to give Gilboa Galil a 91–89 overtime win over Maccabi Ashdod. On December 1, 2019, Gulley recorded 32 points, while shooting 12-of-24 from the field, along with eight rebounds, nine assists and five steals for 42 PIR, leading Gilboa Galil to a 115–106 double overtime win over Ironi Nes Ziona. Two days later, he was named co-Israeli League Round 8 MVP, alongside his teammate Justin Tillman. On January 18, 2020, Gulley recorded a double-double of 30 points with a career-high 16 rebounds, while shooting 11-of-17 from the field, along with five assists for 51 PIR in a 96–80 win over Ironi Nes Ziona. He was named the Israeli League Round 16 MVP. On January 31, 2020, Gulley was named Israeli League Player of the Month after averaging 19.4 points, 8.4 rebounds, 5.4 assists and 1.6 steals in four games played in January. On the season he averaged 18.7 points, 5.9 rebounds, 4.3 assists and 1.8 steals for Hapoel Gilboa Galil.

=== Darüşşafaka (2020–2021) ===
On July 26, 2020, Gulley signed with Darüşşafaka of the Basketball Super League.

=== Gaziantep (2021–2022) ===
On July 6, 2021, Gulley signed with Gaziantep Basketbol of the Turkish Basketball Super League (BSL).

=== Trabzonspor (2026) ===
On March 15, 2026, he signed with Trabzonspor of the Basketbol Süper Ligi (BSL).

=== Gaziantep (2026–present) ===
On August 9, 2021, Gulley signed with Gaziantep Basketbol of the Türkiye Basketbol Ligi (TBL).

== Personal life ==
He is the son of former basketball player James Gulley who played college basketball for the Lamar Cardinals. He has also played for Maccabi Rishon LeZion in Israel, where he led the Israeli League in rebounds for three consecutive years.
