= Hapoel Afula =

Hapoel Afula may refer to:

- Hapoel Afula F.C. - football club
- Hapoel Afula B.C. - basketball club
