= A.S. Kiryat Gat/Ashkelon =

Israeli basketball team

Maccabi Kiryat Gat
- Leagues: Liga Leumit
- Founded: 2003, 2024
- Dissolved: 2018
- History: Maccabi Kiryat Gat (2003–2018); A.S. Ashkelon Kiryat Gat (2024–2025); Maccabi Kiryat Gat/Ashkelon (2025–present)
- Arena: Alon Sport Hall
- Capacity: 500
- Location: Kiryat Gat, Israel
- Team colors: White and Blue
Home	Away

A.S. Kiryat Gat/Ashkelon is an Israeli basketball team from the city of Kiryat Gat, which existed for 15 years, disbanded in 2018, and was re-established in 2024. The team's greatest achievement is winning the Liga Leumit in the 2014–2015 season, earning promotion to the Israeli Basketball Premier League. At the end of the 2024–2025 season, the team returned to play in the Liga Leumit as Maccabi Kiryat Gat.

== History ==
In 2013, the club was relegated to the Liga Artzit, due to financial issues. In 2014, they promoted back to the second division. In 2015, they promoted back to the Premier League after winning the Finals against Kiryat Ata.

On July 16, 2018, Maccabi Kiryat Gat was dissolved due to financial issues.

In the 2024/2025 season, Yehi Biton was appointed as the chairman of the team. The club acquired the management rights of A.S. Ashkelon after the latter merged with Elitzur "Itzu" Ashkelon and began playing in the Liga Artzit (Third Division). At the end of that season, the team finished in 2nd place and advanced to the playoff games, where it defeated Maccabi Be’er Ya’akov 2–0 in the quarterfinals and Maccabi Ma’ale Adumim 2–0 in the semifinals. In the first game of the finals series, it beat Maccabi Ashdod, but before the series was completed, it was promoted to the Liga Leumit (basketball) due to the end of the season following Operation Rising Lion.

== Arenas ==
The team is playing home games at the Alon Sport Hall.

== Honors ==
- Liga Leumit

Champions (1): 2014–15

== Season by season ==
Season	Tier	Division	Pos.	Israeli State Cup
2011–12	3	Liga Artzit	1st	
2012–13	3	Liga Leumit	12th	
2013–14	3	Liga Artzit	1st	
2014–15	2	Liga Leumit	1st	
2015–16	1	Super League	11th	
2016–17	1	Super League	12th	
2017–18	2	Liga Leumit	2nd	

== Notable players ==
Note: Flags indicate national team eligibility at FIBA-sanctioned events. Players may hold other non-FIBA nationalities not displayed.

Criteria

To appear in this section a player must have either:

- Set a club record or won an individual award while at the club
- Played at least one official international match for their national team at any time
- Played at least one official NBA match at any time.

- (Israel) Robert Rothbart
- (Israel) Meir Tapiro
- (Israel) Nimrod Tishman
- (United States) Brandon Bowman
- (United States) Justin Carter
- (United States) Paul Delaney
- (United States) Muhammad El-Amin
- (United States) Marco Killingsworth
- (United States) Keddric Mays
- (United States) Travis Releford
- (United States) Josh Selby
- (United States) Tyshawn Taylor
- (United States) Alando Tucker
- (United States) (Israel) Stu Douglass
- (United States) (Israel) Terrence Watson

== See also ==
- Maccabi Kiryat Gat F.C.
- FC Kiryat Gat
