= Beitar Jerusalem B.C. =

Betar Jerusalem Basketball Club
- Leagues: Liga Alef
- Founded: 2012 (re-foundation)
- History: 1971 – 1976, present
- Arena: Malha Arena
- Location: Jerusalem
- CEO: Jacob Cohen
- Head coach: Gabi Gefen
- Website: http://betar.co.il/
Home	Away

Betar Jerusalem B.C. (Hebrew: בית״ר ירושלים כדורסל) is an Israeli basketball club that is based in Jerusalem. The club currently plays in the IBBA 3rd league.

In the 1970s the club played five consecutive seasons in the Premier League (1971–1976). The club disbanded in 1976 after finishing last place in the league. The club chairman at the time was Moshe Dadash, who was also chairman of Beitar Jerusalem F.C.

The greatest achievement of the club was participate State Cup final season 1972–73, where they lost to Maccabi Tel Aviv 118:79. The star of the club was Jack Eisner, who scored 2,370 points on 110 games in the Premier League.

In March 2012 announced the coaches Gabi Gefen and Tzur Lavi, and businessman Jacob Cohen that they will re-establish of the club, with the assistance of the Chairman of the former club, Moshe Dadash. They recruited players and resources necessary for the re-operation of the club.

In March 2021 businessman Naum Koen became Chairman Of Honor of The club.

The club now compete in the first league, as well as train children, adult men and women in the home arena.

== Arena ==
Currently the club hosts its home games at the Ort Polinski High School hall in Kiryat HaYovel. Previously, games were hosted in Philip Leon Community Center in the same suburb.

== Honors ==
- Israeli Basketball State Cup
  - Finalists: 1972–73
- IBA Cup (5th League)
  - Winners: 2012–13

== 2012/13 Roster ==
Beitar Jerusalem B.C. roster
Players
Coaches

Pos.	No.	Nat.	Name	Ht.	Wt.	Age
		(Israel)	Benbenisti, Avraham
		(Israel)	Shechter, Eli
		(Israel)	Sitsmer, Eliav
		(Israel)	Kochai, Amitai
		(Israel)	Teichthal, Asi
		(Israel)	Cohen, Asaf
		(Israel)	Yadid, Ariel
		(Israel)	Avrahami, Doron
		(Israel)	Kalderon, Dan
		(Israel)	Ben Hemo, Toni
		(Israel)	Sachar, Yehonatan
		(Israel)	Molcho, Yoav
		(Israel)	Holtz, Yosef
		(Israel)	Peterzeil, Yosef
		(Israel)	Beit Yosef, Netanel
		(Israel)	Ben Meir, Ezra
		(Israel)	Nechama, Amit
		(Israel)	Nechama, Roi
		(Israel)	Alush, Shai
		(Israel)	Elmakais, Shimon

Head coach

- (Israel) Gabi Gefen

Assistant coach(es)

- (Israel) Asi Teichthal

Legend

- (C) Team captain
- Injured
