= Hapoel Ramat Gan Givatayim B.C. =

Hapoel Ramat Gan Givatayim
- Nickname: Urduns
- Leagues: Israeli National League
- Founded: 2011; 14 years ago
- Arena: Zisman
- Capacity: 1,200
- Location: Ramat Gan and Givatayim, Israel
- President: Tsahi ben yossef
- Head coach: Matan Harush
- Team captain: Itay Lerer
- Ownership: The Crater Association
- Website: hapoelrgg.com
| Home | Away |

Hapoel Ramat Gan Givatayim B.C. is a professional basketball club based in Ramat Gan and Givatayim, Israel. The club currently plays in the Israeli National League, the second division in Israel.

== History ==
The team was founded in 1957. In 1960 the team was promoted for the first time to the Israeli Basketball Premier League, under the name Hapoel Ramat Gan - Givatayim, and relegated after only one season. In 1964 the group rose again, the first snowfall, but the temporal change Nsra League second group. In 1966 the group fell in League (League then the third), after one season it was back to League Group A, but in 1969 it again fell in the group League. It was back in Group A League in 1971.

In 1973 it rose League first group (then called for the group of Ramat Gan and Hapoel Ramat Gan - Givatayim) movement has already finished the first group and the fourth place until the year 1984 the group did not do worse than fourth place.

Prominent players for the team were: Steve Kaplan, Hanan Keren, Or Goren, Avigdor Moskovitch (also played in Mtazrhim and abroad as well): Steve Slachter, Neal Walk, Cliff Fondkstr, and Steve Malovik. In addition Aimno the group of senior trainers such as: Zvika Sherf and Arie Maliniak, but despite everything the team failed to win a championship. The team finished second six times instead of daring Cup finals five times in the country, but never managed to win a Cup.

The biggest surprise in 1984 was an amazing team to Maccabi Tel Aviv in the semifinal of the State Cup after it defeated 76–80. and It seems group would finally win the title, but missed the final to Hapoel Tel Aviv B.C. 73–79.

After the 1984 broke the association concerned to cover the debt each year groups the team began its deterioration. In 1987 League second group fell a new year fell another group broke third League final. At the end of the 1987/88 season Ramat Gan has dissolved due to financial reasons.

In 2011, Elizitur Ramat Gan B.C. and Hapoel Givatayim B.C. merged to form Hapoel Ramat Gan Givatayim B.C.. In the 2011–12 season, the team debuted in the Liga Bet, the fifth tier in Israel.

== Season by season ==
| Season | Tier | League | Pos. | Israeli State Cup | Other competitions |
|---|---|---|---|---|---|
| 2011-12 | 5 | Liga Bet | 1st | X | |
| 2012-13 | 4 | Liga Alef | 1st | X | |
| 2013-14 | 3 | liga Artzit | 2st | X | |
| 2014–15 | 3 | Liga Artzit | 1st | X | |
| 2015–16 | 2 | National League | 12th | Quarter Final | |
| 2016–17 | 2 | National League | 14th | First round | |
| 2017–18 | 2 | National League | 7th | Round of 16 | |
| 2018–19 | 2 | National League | 12th | X | |
| 2019–20 | 2 | National League | | First round | |

== Roster ==
Hapoel Ramat-Gan Givatayim roster
Players
Coaches

| Pos. | No. | Nat. | Name | Ht. | Age |
|---|---|---|---|---|---|
| G | 1 | (United States) | Lemon, Stedmon | 1.98 m (6 ft 6 in) | 32 – 31 December 1992 |
| PF | 4 | (Israel) | Ariely, Roy | 2.02 m (6 ft 8 in) | 25 – 10 April 2000 |
| C | 6 | (Israel) | Haim, Yuval | 2.04 m (6 ft 8 in) | 26 – 1 June 1999 |
| PF | 7 | (Israel) | Shterenberg, Gal | 2.03 m (6 ft 8 in) | 26 – 27 August 1999 |
| G | 8 | (Israel) | Drucker, Tomer | 1.85 m (6 ft 1 in) | 26 – 10 November 1998 |
| G | 9 | (Israel) | Rabinowitz, Nimrod | 1.80 m (5 ft 11 in) | 25 – 11 October 1999 |
| G | 10 | (Israel) | Lavie, Guy | 1.90 m (6 ft 3 in) | 33 – 27 February 1992 |
| PF | 11 | (United States) | Combs, Jeremy | 2.01 m (6 ft 7 in) | 29 – 24 November 1995 |
| G | 12 | (Israel) | Elkayam, Nadav | 1.82 m (6 ft 0 in) | 25 – 16 December 1999 |
| G | 13 | (Israel) | Yerushalmy, Shaked | 1.91 m (6 ft 3 in) | 27 – 8 March 1998 |
| SF | 22 | (Israel) | Rinski, Harel | 1.99 m (6 ft 6 in) | 23 – 26 June 2002 |
| C | 24 | (United States) | Warren, Storm | 2.11 m (6 ft 11 in) | 36 – 4 November 1988 |
| G | 25 | (Israel) | Noyovitch, Gil | 1.82 m (6 ft 0 in) | 24 – 1 September 2001 |

Head coach

- (Israel) Matan Haroush

Assistant coach(es)

- (Israel) Liam Acharkan

Legend

- (C) Team captain
- Injured

- Roster
Updated: September 1, 2022

== Notable players ==
- Albert Hemmo
- Chaim Zlotikman (born 1957)
