= Jacob Eisner =

Israeli basketball player (born 1947)

Jacob Eisner גיי'קוב (ג'ק) אייזנר
Personal information
- Born: December 18, 1947 (age 78) Łódź, Poland
- Listed height: 2.05 m (6 ft 9 in)

Career information
- College: University of Cincinnati
- Position: Center

Career history
- 1971-76: Beitar Jerusalem

Career highlights
- 1974 Asian Games gold medal

Jacob Eisner (Hebrew: גיי'קוב (ג'ק) אייזנר; born December 18, 1947) is an Israeli former basketball player. He played the center position. He played in the Israel Basketball Premier League and for the Israeli national basketball team.

== Biography ==
Eisner was born on December 18, 1947, in Łódź, Poland. At 13 years of age he along with his family moved to the Cincinnati in the United States; he subsequently attended the University of Cincinnati. He later immigrated to Israel. He is 2.05 m (6 ft 9 in) tall.

He played in the Israel Basketball Premier League for Beitar Jerusalem from 1971 to 1976.

Eisner also played for the Israeli national basketball team in the 1972 Pre-Olympic Basketball Tournament, 1973 European Championship for Men, 1975 European Championship for Men, and 1976 European Olympic Qualifying Tournament for Men.
