= Israeli Basketball State Cup =

Sports competition

- Current season, competition or edition: 2025–26 Israeli Basketball State Cup
- Sport: Basketball
- First season: 1955
- CEO: Shay Shani
- No. of teams: 26
- Country: Israel
- Continent: (European Union) Europe
- Most recent champion: Maccabi Tel Aviv (47 titles)
- Most titles: Maccabi Tel Aviv (47 titles)
- Broadcaster: Sport 5
- Related competitions: Ligat Winner Sal; Liga Leumit
- Website: ibasketball.co.il

The Israeli Basketball State Cup (Hebrew: גביע המדינה בכדורסל) is the second most important professional basketball competition in Israel, after the Israeli Super League. It is the national federation cup of Israel. The tournament began in the 1955–56 season, and is run by the Israel Basketball Association.

In the 21–22 season, the tournament format was changed so that only the first 8 teams at the end of the first rotation of the Israeli Basketball Premier League will compete. The quarter-final matches will be drawn between the teams in places 1-4 against 5-8 for a one-game elimination match. The winners advances to the semi-final matches which also consists of one game elimination match. the winners of the semi-final advances to the final match. Until the 21–22, The tournament format consists of teams from the Israeli Basketball Premier League and the National League facing each other for a one-game elimination match. The winner advances to the second round, which also consists of one game elimination match. The winner of the second round advances to the quarter-final stage.

== Titles by team ==
Team	Winners	Runner-Up
Maccabi Tel Aviv	47	8
Hapoel Jerusalem	8	9
Hapoel Tel Aviv	4	13
Hapoel Holon	2	5
Bnei Herzliya	2	4
Hapoel Galil Elyon	2	3
Hapoel Gvat/Yagur	1	1
Hapoel Ramat Gan	0	5
Maccabi Haifa	0	4
Maccabi Rishon LeZion	0	4
Ironi Ramat Gan	0	2
Elitzur Netanya	0	2
Beitar Jerusalem	0	1
Hapoel Eilat	0	1
Hapoel Givatayim	0	1
Maccabi Ashdod	0	1
Maccabi Giv'at Shmuel	0	1
Ironi Nahariya	0	1

== Finals ==
Season	Winner	Runner-up	Score
1955–56	Maccabi Tel Aviv	Hapoel Tel Aviv	52–49, 56–50
1956–57	Cancelled due to the Suez Crisis		
1957–58	Maccabi Tel Aviv	Hapoel Tel Aviv	53–44
1958–59	Maccabi Tel Aviv	Hapoel Holon	53–47
1959–60	Not held		
1960–61	Maccabi Tel Aviv	Hapoel Holon	74–46
1961–62	Hapoel Tel Aviv	Maccabi Tel Aviv	50–48
1962–63	Maccabi Tel Aviv	Hapoel Tel Aviv	55–51
1963–64	Maccabi Tel Aviv	Hapoel Tel Aviv	50–47
1964–65	Maccabi Tel Aviv	Hapoel Tel Aviv	55–47
1965–66	Maccabi Tel Aviv	Hapoel Tel Aviv	66–62
1966–67	Cancelled due to the Six-Day War		
1967–68	Cancelled due to the War of Attrition		
1968–69	Hapoel Tel Aviv	Maccabi Tel Aviv	88–70
1969–70	Maccabi Tel Aviv	Hapoel Tel Aviv	73–52
1970–71	Maccabi Tel Aviv	Maccabi Haifa	70–51
1971–72	Maccabi Tel Aviv	Maccabi Ironi Ramat Gan	108–99
1972–73	Maccabi Tel Aviv	Betar Jerusalem	118–79
1973–74	Cancelled due to the Yom Kippur War		
1974–75	Maccabi Tel Aviv	Hapoel Gvat/Yagur	89–74
1975–76	Hapoel Gvat/Yagur	Hapoel Tel Aviv	90–76
1976–77	Maccabi Tel Aviv	Hapoel Tel Aviv	78–77
1977–78	Maccabi Tel Aviv	Hapoel Tel Aviv	93–90
1978–79	Maccabi Tel Aviv	Hapoel Ramat Gan	73–66
1979–80	Maccabi Tel Aviv	Hapoel Ramat Gan	105–87
1980–81	Maccabi Tel Aviv	Hapoel Ramat Gan	105–95
1981–82	Maccabi Tel Aviv	Hapoel Ramat Gan	90–77
1982–83	Maccabi Tel Aviv	Hapoel Tel Aviv	99–94
1983–84	Hapoel Tel Aviv	Hapoel Ramat Gan	79–73
1984–85	Maccabi Tel Aviv	Maccabi Haifa	121–81
1985–86	Maccabi Tel Aviv	Hapoel Holon	90–86
1986–87	Maccabi Tel Aviv	Hapoel Galil Elyon	95–86
1987–88	Hapoel Galil Elyon	Maccabi Elitzur Netanya	79–77
1988–89	Maccabi Tel Aviv	Maccabi Ironi Ramat Gan	107–85
1989–90	Maccabi Tel Aviv	Hapoel Galil Elyon	92–90
1990–91	Maccabi Tel Aviv	Hapoel Holon	100–90
1991–92	Hapoel Galil Elyon	Maccabi Rishon LeZion	84–76
1992–93	Hapoel Tel Aviv	Hapoel Givatayim	71–65
1993–94	Maccabi Tel Aviv	Hapoel Tel Aviv	64–53
1994–95	Bnei Herzlia	Hapoel Holon	88–77
1995–96	Hapoel Jerusalem	Maccabi Tel Aviv	67–65
1996–97	Hapoel Jerusalem	Maccabi Tel Aviv	89–82
1997–98	Maccabi Tel Aviv	Hapoel Galil Elyon	83–70
1998–99	Maccabi Tel Aviv	Hapoel Jerusalem	69–68
1999–00	Maccabi Tel Aviv	Hapoel Jerusalem	68–57
2000–01	Maccabi Tel Aviv	Hapoel Jerusalem	82–78
2001–02	Maccabi Tel Aviv	Hapoel Jerusalem	99–73
2002–03	Maccabi Tel Aviv	Maccabi Giv'at Shmuel	96–83
2003–04	Maccabi Tel Aviv	Hapoel Jerusalem	108–85
2004–05	Maccabi Tel Aviv	Bnei HaSharon	108–89
2005–06	Maccabi Tel Aviv	Hapoel Jerusalem	96–91
2006–07	Hapoel Jerusalem	Bnei HaSharon	103–85
2007–08	Hapoel Jerusalem	Maccabi Tel Aviv	93–89
2008–09	Hapoel Holon	Maccabi Haifa	69–68
2009–10	Maccabi Tel Aviv	Bnei HaSharon	77–70
2010–11	Maccabi Tel Aviv	Barak Netanya	106–70
2011–12	Maccabi Tel Aviv	Maccabi Rishon LeZion	82–69
2012–13	Maccabi Tel Aviv	Maccabi Haifa	76–68
2013–14	Maccabi Tel Aviv	Hapoel Eilat	80–73
2014–15	Maccabi Tel Aviv	Hapoel Jerusalem	94–76
2015–16	Maccabi Tel Aviv	Maccabi Ashdod	83–75
2016–17	Maccabi Tel Aviv	Hapoel Jerusalem	82–68
2017–18	Hapoel Holon	Maccabi Tel Aviv	86–84
2018–19	Hapoel Jerusalem	Maccabi Rishon LeZion	82–67
2019–20	Hapoel Jerusalem	Ironi Nahariya	92–89
2020–21	Maccabi Tel Aviv	Maccabi Rishon LeZion	86–69
2022	Bnei Herzliya	Hapoel Tel Aviv	87–82
2023	Hapoel Jerusalem	Maccabi Tel Aviv	67–61
2024	Hapoel Jerusalem	Maccabi Tel Aviv	85–72
2025	Maccabi Tel Aviv	Hapoel Jerusalem	87–72
2026	Maccabi Tel Aviv	Bnei Herzliya	109–90

== Israeli State Cup Finals MVPs ==
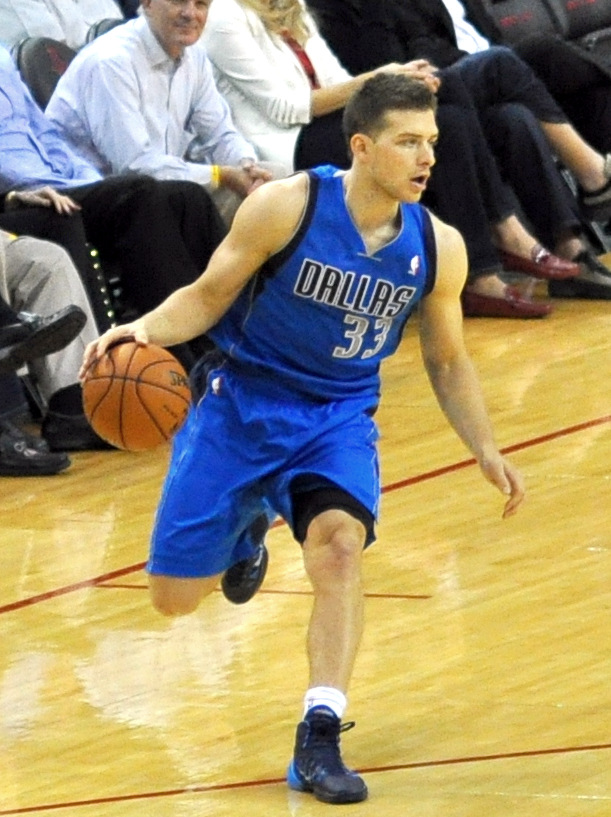
Gal Mekel

Season	Cup Finals MVP	Club
2015–16	(Israel) Gal Mekel	Maccabi Tel Aviv
2016–17	(Israel) Gal Mekel	Maccabi Tel Aviv
2017–18	(United States) Glen Rice Jr.	Hapoel Holon
2018–19	(United States) TaShawn Thomas	Hapoel Jerusalem
2019–20	(United States) J'Covan Brown	Hapoel Jerusalem
2020–21	(Israel) Yovel Zoosman	Maccabi Tel Aviv
2022	(United States) Chinanu Onuaku	Bnei Herzliya
2023	(United States) Speedy Smith	Hapoel Jerusalem
2024	(United States) Speedy Smith	Hapoel Jerusalem
2025	(Lithuania) Rokas Jokubaitis	Maccabi Tel Aviv
2026	(Israel) Roman Sorkin	Maccabi Tel Aviv
