= Elitzur Ramla B.C. =

Elitzur Ramla
- Leagues: Liga Artzit; State Cup
- Founded: 1970; 55 years ago
- Arena: Kiriat Menahem Arena (capacity: 2,000)
- Location: Ramla, Israel
- Team colors: white and Blue
- President: Moti Cohen
- Head coach: Avi Sucar
| Home | Away |

Elitzur Neve David Ramla (Hebrew: אליצור נווה-דוד רמלה) is a basketball club based in Ramla in Israel. The club plays Liga Artzit in the third division of Israeli basketball. The club played in the Israeli Basketball Premier League in the 1987–88 season.
