= Maccabi Kiryat Motzkin B.C. =

Maccabi Kiryat Motzkin
- Leagues: Israeli National League
- Founded: 1955; 70 years ago
- Arena: Goshen Hall
- Capacity: 800
- Location: Kiryat Motzkin
- Team colors: Yellow and Blue
- Head coach: Shlomi Abuhatzeira
- Team captain: Shalev Lugasi
Home	Away

Maccabi Kiryat Motzkin (Hebrew: מכבי קריית מוצקין) is a professional basketball club based in Kiryat Motzkin in the Haifa District of Israel. The team plays in the Israeli National League.

== History ==
Maccabi Kiryat Motzkin was founded in 1955. They have played in the Israeli Premier League from 1958 until 1966.

In the 2018-19 season, They have reached the 2019 Israeli National League Playoffs as the second seed, but they eventually were eliminated by Hapoel Galil Elyon in the Semifinals.

== Current roster ==
Maccabi Kiryat Motzkin roster
Players
Coaches

Pos.	No.	Nat.	Name	Ht.	Age
PG	5	(Israel)	Alon, Amit	1.85 m (6 ft 1 in)	25 – 9 February 2000
G/F	12	(Israel)	Pappo, Noam
G/F	6	(Israel)	Cornelius, Rom	1.98 m (6 ft 6 in)	32 – 5 February 1993
G	7	(Israel)	Uzan, Niv	1.90 m (6 ft 3 in)	26 – 10 July 1998
G/F	12	(Israel)	Pappo, Noam
F	8	(United States)	Stevens, Amin	1.98 m (6 ft 6 in)	34 – 26 October 1990
G	9	(Israel)	Maayan, Tom	1.88 m (6 ft 2 in)	31 – 5 July 1993
F	10	(Israel)	Farber, Guy	2.00 m (6 ft 7 in)	31 – 25 June 1993
G	11	(Israel)	Matalon, Noam (C)	1.97 m (6 ft 6 in)	37 – 8 April 1987
F/C	12	(Israel)	Shoshani, Omer	2.02 m (6 ft 8 in)	28 – 8 August 1996
G	13	(Israel)	Tesler, Gal	1.86 m (6 ft 1 in)	32 – 25 February 1993
F/C	15	(United Kingdom)	Ekperigin, Laurence	2.03 m (6 ft 8 in)	37 – 21 February 1988

Head coach

- (Israel) Roy Pearl

Assistant coach(es)

- (Israel) Elad Fogel

Legend

- (C) Team captain
- Injured

- Roster
Updated: September 22, 2019

== Notable players ==
Note: Flags indicate national team eligibility at FIBA-sanctioned events. Players may hold other non-FIBA nationalities not displayed.

Criteria

To appear in this section a player must have either:

- Set a club record or won an individual award while at the club
- Played at least one official international match for their national team at any time
- Played at least one official NBA match at any time.

- (Serbia) Miloš Babić
- (Panama) Javier Carter
- (United States) Jo Jo English
- (United States) (Israel) David Bernsley (born 1969)
- (United States) (Israel) Terry Fair
- (United States) (France) Marcus Gaither
- (United States) Derrick Gervin
- (United States) Dennis Hopson
- (Serbia) Rade Milutinović
- (United States) (Israel) Jeron Roberts
- (United States) Jamar Samuels
- (Bosnia and Herzegovina) Samir Selešković
- (Israel) Alon Stein
- (Israel) Meir Tapiro
