= Liga Leumit (basketball) =

Israeli 2nd basketball league

- Founded: 1966; 60 years ago
- First season: 1966–67
- Country: Israel
- Federation: IBBA
- Confederation: FIBA Europe
- Number of teams: 16
- Level on pyramid: 2
- Promotion to: Israeli Premier League
- Relegation to: Liga Artzit
- Domestic cup: Israeli Basketball Leumit Cup
- Current champions: Ironi Eilat (2025–26)
- Website: ibasketball.co.il
- 2026–27 Israeli Basketball National League

Liga Leumit (Hebrew: ליגה לאומית, lit. National League) is the second tier of professional league basketball competition in Israel. The teams compete for promotion to the Israeli Basketball Premier League, the first tier, and fight to avoid relegation to the Liga Artzit, the third tier.

== League system ==
On 30 July, 2024 the Israel Basketball Association announces new game system. The regular season be played in a home-and-away round-robin format. The top 6 finishers will advance to the Top-teams League Group, and the rest of the teams will advance to the Bottom-Teams League Group. The winner of the Top-teams League Group will be promoted to the Premier League, while the 2nd to 9th ranked teams will advance to the playoff to determine the second team that will be promoted. The two teams that finish at the bottom of the Bottom-Teams League Group will be relegated to the Liga Artzit.

== Current teams ==
=== Venues and locations ===
League Map

Team	City	Arena	Capacity
A.S. Elitzur Ashkelon	Ashkelon	Ashkelon Sports Arena	3,000
A.S. Ramat HaSharon	Ramat HaSharon	Kiryat Yearim Hall	900
Elitzur Netanya	Netanya	Arena Netanya	2,500
Elitzur Shomron	Shomron Regional Council	Yeshivet Amit, Brukhin	280
Elitzur Yavne	Yavne	Ralf Klain Hall	930
Hapoel Haifa	Haifa	Romema Arena	5,000
Hapoel Hevel Modi'in	Hevel Modi'in Regional Council	Nachshon Hall	
Hapoel Migdal HaEmek/Jezreel	Migdal HaEmek and Jezreel Valley Regional Council	Yearot HaEmek, Migdal HaEmek	900
Ironi Nahariya	Nahariya	Ein Sara Sport Hall	2,500
Maccabi Kiryat Gat/Ashkelon	Kiryat Gat and Ashkelon	Kramim Sport Hall, Kiryat Gat	400
Maccabi Kiryat Motzkin	Kiryat Motzkin	Goshen Hall	600
Maccabi Mendal Petah Tikva	Petah Tikva	Rozmarin Sport Hall	500
Maccabi Ra'anana	Ra'anana	Metro West	1,650
Maccabi Rehovot	Rehovot	Barzilai Sports Center	700
Otef Darom B.C.	Gaza Envelope	Rotem Hall, Kibutz Magen	500

== Promotion and relegation ==
Season	Premier League		Liga Artzit	
Season	Promoted to	Relegated from	Promoted from	Relegated to
2025–26	Ironi Eilat; Maccabi Ashdod	Elitzur Netanya; Maccabi Ironi Ra'anana	Hapoel Hevel Modi'in; Maccabi Kiryat Motzkin	S.C. Zafed; Maccabi Ma'ale Adumim; Maccabi Haifa
2024–25	Ironi Ra'anana; Maccabi Rishon LeZion	Hapoel Haifa; ~~Elitzur Netanya~~	Maccabi Haifa; Maccabi Ashdod; Maccabi Kiryat Gat/Ashkelon; Maccabi Mendal Petah Tikva; Maccabi Ma'ale Adumim	~~Elitzur Shomron~~; Hapoel Kfar Saba; Hapoel Bnei Kafr Qasim (Note: Hapoel Bnei Kafr Qasem has informed the Israeli Basketball Association that it will not fulfill its place in the National League in the 2025–26 season.)
2023–24	Elitzur Netanya; Hapoel Gilboa Galil	Hapoel Eilat	Hapoel Migdal HaEmek/Jezreel; Elitzur Yavne; Hapoel Kfar Saba	Maccabi Haifa; Maccabi Ma'ale Adumim
2022–23	Maccabi Ironi Ramat Gan; Hapoel Afula	Hapoel Gilboa Galil	F.C. Safed; Hapoel Bnei Kafr Qasim	Hapoel Ramat Gan Givatayim; Hapoel Hevel Modi'in
2021–22	Elitzur Kiryat Ata	Maccabi Rishon LeZion	Elitzur Shomron; Maccabi Rehovot	Maccabi Ashdod; Hapoel Migdal HaEmek/Jezreel; Maccabi Hod HaSharon
2020–21	Hapoel Galil Elyon; ~~Elitzur Netanya~~	Ironi Nahariya; Maccabi Haifa	Hapoel Migdal/Jezreel; Maccabi Ma'ale Adumim	Maccabi Kiryat Motzkin; Hapoel Acre/Mateh Asher; Elitzur Yavne
2019–20	Bnei Herzliya; Hapoel Haifa	Maccabi Ashdod	Hapoel Acre/Mateh Asher; Ironi Ramat Gan	None
2018–19	Maccabi Haifa	Bnei Herzliya	A.S. Ramat HaSharon; Hapoel Hevel Modi'in	Hapoel Kfar Saba; Maccabi Rehovot
2017–18	Hapoel Be'er Sheva	Maccabi Haifa	Elitzur Netanya; Elitzur Eito Ashkelon	Hapoel Migdal Haemek; ~~Hapoel Haifa~~
2016–17	Ironi Nes Ziona	Maccabi Kiryat Gat	Maccabi Kiryat Motzkin; Elitzur Yavne	A.S. Ramat HaSharon; Ironi Ramat Gan
2015–16	Hapoel Gilboa Galil	Ironi Nes Ziona	Hapoel Haifa; Maccabi Rehovot	Elitzur Yavne; Elitzur Ashkelon
2014–15	Maccabi Kiryat Gat	Hapoel Gilboa Galil	Hapoel Ramat Gan Givatayim; Hapoel Be'er Sheva	Elitzur Ramla
2013–14	Ironi Nahariya	Barak Netanya	Iron Ra'anana; Maccabi Kiryat Gat	Hapoel Kiryat Tiv'on; Maccabi Be'er Ya'akov
2012–13	Ironi Nes Ziona	Elitzur Ashkelon	Hapoel Migdal Haemek; A.S. Ramat HaSharon	Maccabi Kiryat Bialik; Maccabi Kiryat Gat
2011–12	Hapoel Tel Aviv	None	Hapoel Galil Elyon; Maccabi Kiryat Bialik; Maccabi Kiryat Gat	Hapoel Lev HaSharon; Hapeol Megiddo
2010–11	Habikaa B.C.	None	Ironi Nes Ziona; Ironi Kiryat Ata	Hapoel Be'eri
2009–10	Maccabi Ashdod	Ironi Nahariya; Ironi Ramat Gan	Hapoel Ussishkin	Ironi Kiryat Ata; Hapoel Nazareth Illit; Hapoel Haifa
2008–09	Barak Netanya; Hapoel Afula	Elitzur Givat Shmuel; Ironi Kiryat Ata	Hapoel Haifa; Maccabi Be'er Ya'akov	Ironi Nes Ziona; Beitar Binyamina
2007–08	Maccabi Givat Shmuel; Maccabi Haifa; Ironi Kiryat Ata	Hapoel Gilboa/Afula	Ironi Nes Ziona; Maccabi Kiryat Tiv'on; Hapoel Kfar Saba; Hapoel Be'eri	Hapoel Be'er Sheva; Maccabi Shoham
2006–07	Hapoel Holon	Maccabi Givat Shmuel	Maccabi Haifa; Elitzur Yavne	Hapoel Tel Aviv; Hapoel Giv'atayim
2005–06	Hapoel Gilboa/Afula	Hapoel Haifa/Ramat HaSharon	A.S. Ramat HaSharon; Hapoel Tel Aviv	Maccabi Rosh HaAyin; Maccabi Petah Tikva
2004–05	~~Ironi Ramat Ef'al~~; Ironi Ramat Gan	Maccabi Petah Tikva; B.C. Haifa/Nesher	Barak Netanya; Beitar Binyamina; Maccabi Hod HaSharon	Hapoel Yarka; Maccabi Kiryat Bialik; Ironi Ramat Ef'al; Hapoel Migdal Haemek
2003–04	Maccabi Petah Tikva	Ironi Ramat Gan	Ironi Ramat Ef'al; Hapoel Yarka	Maccabi Hadera; Bnei Herzliya
2002–03	Elitzur Ashkelon	Elitzur Kiryat Ata/Motzkin	Hapoel Holon; Hapoel Migdal Haemek	Hapoel Safed; Hapoel Kfar Saba
2001–02	Hapoel Tel Aviv; Ironi Nahariya	Bnei Herzliya	Maccabi Kiryat Bialik	Hapoel Holon; Maccabi Karmiel
2000–01	Elitzur Givat Shmuel	Elitzur Ashkelon; Maccabi Hadera; Hapoel Haifa/Nesher; Hapoel Holon; Hapoel Safed; Maccabi Karmiel	None	None

== See also ==
- Israel Basketball Association
- Basketball in Israel
