= Elitzur Yavne B.C. =

Israeli basketball team

Elitzur Yavne אליצור יבנה
- Nickname: EYV
- Leagues: Liga Leumit
- Founded: 1991; 35 years ago
- Arena: Ralf Klain Hall (capacity: 600)
- Location: Yavne, Israel
- Team colors: Yellow and Blue
- President: Shaul David
- Head coach: Shai Segalovich
Home	Away

Elitzur Yavne (Hebrew: אליצור יבנה) are a professional basketball team based in Yavne, Israel. The team currently plays in the Liga Leumit, the second tier of basketball in Israel, having been promoted from Liga Arzit (third division) at the end of the 2006–07 season. In 2005–06 and 2006–07, the team won the Igud Cup. The club runs a youth department with six teams, where NBA player Omri Casspi started out. The team hosts their games in the "Shabazi Hall", with 600 seats, in Yavne.

== Honors ==
- Igud Cup:
  - Winners (2): 2005–06, 2006–07

== Current roster ==
Note: Flags indicate national team eligibility at FIBA-sanctioned events. Players may hold other non-FIBA nationalities not displayed.

Elitzur Yavne roster
Players
Coaches

Pos.	No.	Nat.	Name	Ht.	Age
F	4	(Israel)	Goldenberg, Dor	2.05 m (6 ft 9 in)	31 – 31 May 1995
F	8	(Israel)	David, Sagiv	1.98 m (6 ft 6 in)	33 – 15 November 1992
F	9	(Israel)	Halfon, Hen	1.96 m (6 ft 5 in)	30 – 10 April 1996
G	10	(Israel)	Hamo, Guy	1.88 m (6 ft 2 in)	19 – 22 March 2007
G/F	11	(Israel)	Hoffman, Elad (C)	1.93 m (6 ft 4 in)	40 – 8 October 1985
PG	12	(Israel)	David, Jonathan	1.86 m (6 ft 1 in)	30 – 18 September 1995
G/F	13	(Israel)	Borsuk, Amir	1.94 m (6 ft 4 in)	28 – 6 May 1998
PF	14	(United States)	Walker, C. J.	2.03 m (6 ft 8 in)	25 – 29 March 2001
F/C	15	(United States)	Bowman, Brandon	2.06 m (6 ft 9 in)	41 – 15 October 1984
G	22	(Israel)	Bauman, Yair	1.86 m (6 ft 1 in)	26 – 2 November 1999

Head coach

- (Israel) Shai Segalovich

Assistant coach(es)

- (Israel) Isaac Aftaker

Legend

- (C) Team captain
- Injured

- Roster
Updated: August 1, 2026

== Notable players ==
- (Israel) Omri Casspi
- (Israel) / (Germany) Alon Stein
- (United States) Ray Willis
