= Maccabi Hod HaSharon =

Basketball team in Israel

- Leagues: Israeli National League
- Founded: 1968; 57 years ago
- Arena: Atidim
- Capacity: 400
- Location: Hod HaSharon, Israel
- Team colors: Blue and White
- President: Uri Ashkenazi
- Team manager: Menachem Baleli
- Head coach: Nati Cohen
- Team captain: Ido Davidi
- Website: http://www.hhbb.co.il
Home	Away

Maccabi Hod HaSharon (Hebrew: מכבי הוד השרון) is a professional basketball club based in Hod HaSharon in the Sharon region, Central District of Israel. The team plays in the Israeli National League.

== History ==
=== Alumni ===
Maccabi Hod Hasharon took the National League prior to 2005/2006 and its first season finished in 9th place. In 2006/07 the group was built by the professional director of the Association, Israel Heart, who coached many groups Premier League. Ami Nawi Group signed his first season on the sidelines as head coach. The group was named as one of the most surprising teams of the league after finishing 6th place (out of 14) and went to the playoffs the top.

The following season, 2007/2008 group built by Israel, Nawi and heart. From the previous season left three players - age in reindeer Engel and Daniel Gur Arie. They were joined by Guy Kantor old. Around Kantor brought young players When the goal is to survive in the league. During the season, the stranger returned last season, Stacey Moragne. Also, Pepi Turgeman and fan Hirsch joined the group, and the team finished the season in mid table.

Towards the 2008/2009 season it was decided to change the club concept. Professional manager and the coach did not continue, instead appointed the youngest coach Nati Cohen, reaped many successes as director of youth and youth team coach in the Upper Galilee Cohen, along with assistant coach appointed - Encourage Wolfson, former player at the club, built a new team almost from the beginning, with only two players have continued from the previous season, Eyal Engel and Moti Moskowitz. They were joined by Elena Sharon picked Lisfitz and Nir Golan And advance eye Shay Nahum and destination Kahane. Talented young point guard Oded Brandwein signed Ramla group, as did the high Yevgeny Liotrin came from Binyamina. Finally joined the group Pine Manski - a new immigrant from the U.S., and the U.S. Blake Hamilton came after several seasons throughout the European continent. This season was the peak season for the team which finished the season in the semi-final of the National League playoffs after competing against Barak Netanya came this season in the Premiership.

The following season, 2009/2010, it was decided to cut about 40% of the budget group. The team, trained by me Barkan grew up in the club, started the season well but towards the end of the first round began to get involved at the bottom of the league. In March It was decided for the first time in team history to shock the system and say goodbye Barkan. Hai David, who coached the boys team's youth department is called to help adults and leave the league. After a series of convincing wins in the group stayed in when she finishes Away from the red line.

In light of the great success the task of staying in the league, kept alive Davidi on the sidelines when it attaches underneath the Uri Hiitin coaching post. The group surprised when signing Gary Gendel, senior Israeli, who won season before the League Championship National. Throughout the first round group ranked at the top of the table. Like last season, the team began to get involved with a chain losses, and recycling before the end of the regular season, it was decided to shock the system, say goodbye to David, and replace Helps. The group reached the crucial game in week of the playoffs last lower against Hapoel Beeri, the loser of which will go down in the National League. The game, watched by 550 spectators, was stretching which ended Hood's dramatic victory Sharon 74:76, and stay for another season in the minors.

This summer (Jul - Aug 2011), signed between Maccabi Haifa and club agreement on cooperation for the upcoming season, which will participate with Haifa Hod HaSharon at the cost of 2 and 5 naturalized foreigners, were examined in Florida held the owner of the Jeffrey Rosen. At the same time, professional manager of the club, in Israel managed to surprise note when signed for the upcoming season the most respected coach in the league, Rami Hadar. Compared to past seasons, the group name for the purpose grab a playoff spot top National League, something that did happen, and the team even qualified for the finals series against Ness - Ziona.

=== Boys ===
In the mid-2000s, the concept was changed managerial and professional aspect of the youth department. The change was decided after the department, lagged behind neighboring youth departments, suffered the departure of players intense and accomplished little. After the change has been made Comprehensive management structure, was elected Israel's heart in the city, has a glorious past in Israeli basketball, as Director Professional.

After several years of wrestling on qualifying National League at the age of youth and age of youth, won the 2009/10 season the boys team championship and advanced to the Sharon Region first Little League team. The following season, won the youth group Youth department much respect, when a group of children A team finished last season state championship semi-final and semi-final Cup kids. In light of the many accomplishments and the constant upgrading of the youth department, ceased almost completely leaving Players, and instead join hands Season players competing in the youth department.

Today, the youth department is represented in all youth basketball senior leagues in the country, and has 17 teams and -270 actors and actresses age Hackett - Basket youth to age. Basketball school run by Itai Levi, a graduate of the club, currently playing 350 players across the city.

== Players ==
=== Current roster ===
Maccabi Hod HaSharon roster
Players
Coaches

Pos.	No.	Nat.	Name	Ht.	Age
G	4	(United States) (Puerto Rico)	Hughes, Trévon	1.83 m (6 ft 0 in)	38 – 4 April 1987
F/C	5	(Israel)	Amiram, Yariv	2.04 m (6 ft 8 in)	31 – 16 January 1994
PG	8	(Israel)	Harel, Omer	1.85 m (6 ft 1 in)	25 – 25 September 2000
F/C	9	(United States)	Hall, Jimmy	2.03 m (6 ft 8 in)	31 – 2 April 1994
G	10	(Israel)	Paz, Idan	1.88 m (6 ft 2 in)	30 – 24 January 1995
G	11	(Israel)	Davidi, Ido (C)	1.89 m (6 ft 2 in)	29 – 2 August 1996
PG	12	(Israel)	Noyovitz, Gil	1.82 m (6 ft 0 in)	24 – 1 September 2001
G	14	(Israel)	Amir, Shachar	1.88 m (6 ft 2 in)	26 – 11 March 1999
G/F	15	(Israel)	Aloush, Guy	1.96 m (6 ft 5 in)	25 – 14 February 2000
G	22	(Israel)	Dadon, Harel	1.93 m (6 ft 4 in)	27 – 4 May 1998
F	23	(Israel)	Arieli, Roei	1.97 m (6 ft 6 in)	25 – 10 April 2000
G	24	(Israel)	Zaracovitz, Niv	1.88 m (6 ft 2 in)	24 – 19 April 2001
F	25	(Israel)	Herson, Liam	2.04 m (6 ft 8 in)	24 – 21 January 2001

Head coach

- (Israel) Nati Cohen

Assistant coach(es)

- (Israel) Itay Barkan

Legend

- (C) Team captain
- Injured

- Roster
Updated: December 28, 2019
