= 2024–25 Israeli Basketball National League =

Israeli Basketball National League
- Season: 2024–25
- Teams: 14

Regular season
- Promoted: Maccabi Ironi Ra'anana; Maccabi Rishon LeZion
- Relegated: Elitzur Shomron; Hapoel Kfar Saba

Finals
- Champions: Maccabi Ironi Ra'anana

The 2024-2025 Israeli Basketball National League will be its 26th season as the second tier since its re-alignment in 2000 and the 71st season of second-tier basketball in Israel.

== Format ==
On 30 July, 2024 the Israel Basketball Association announces new game system for the National League. The regular season be played in a 26-round (13 round-robin format). The top 6 finishers will advance to the Top-teams League Group, and the 7th to 14th ranked teams will advance to the Bottom-Teams League Group. The winner of the Top-teams League Group will be promoted to the Premier League, while the 2nd to 9th ranked teams (2nd to 6th from the Top-teams League Group and 7th to 9th Bottom-Teams League Group) will advance to the playoff to determine the second team that will be promoted. The two teams that finish at the bottom of the Bottom-Teams League Group will be relegated to the Liga Artzit.

== Teams ==
The following teams have changed division since the 2023–2024 season.

=== To Liga Leumit ===
Promoted from Liga Artzit

- Hapoel Migdal HaEmek/Jezreel (North Division)
- Hapoel Kfar Saba (North Division)
- Elitzur Yavne (South Division)

Relegated from Premier League

- Ironi Eilat

=== From Liga Leumit ===
Promoted to Premier League

- Hapoel Gilboa Galil
- Elitzur Netanya

Relegated to Liga Artzit

- Maccabi Haifa
- Maccabi Ma'ale Adumim

On 29 July 2024, the Israeli Basketball Association decided to attach a new team to the league from Gaza Envelope. the team cannot be promoted or relegated.

=== Venues and locations ===
League Map

| Team | City | Arena | Capacity |
|---|---|---|---|
| A.S. Elitzur Ashkelon | Ashkelon | Ashkelon Sports Arena | 3,000 |
| A.S. Ramat HaSharon | Ramat HaSharon | Kiryat Yearim Hall | 900 |
| Elitzur Shomron | Shomron Regional Council | Leader Sport Center, Ganei Tikva | 1,000 |
| Elitzur Yavne | Yavne | Ralf Klain Hall | 930 |
| S.C. Safed | Safed | HaPais Hall Safed | 608 |
| Hapoel Bnei Kafr Qasim | Kafr Qasim | Zisman Hall, Ramat Gan | 1,500 |
| Hapoel Migdal HaEmek/Jezreel | Migdal HaEmek and Jezreel Valley Regional Council | Yearot HaEmek | 900 |
| Hapoel Kfar Saba | Kfar Saba | HaYovel Kfar Saba | 680 |
| Ironi Eilat | Eilat | Begin Arena | 1,490 |
| Ironi Nahariya | Nahariya | Ein Sara Sport Hall | 2,500 |
| Ironi Ra'anana | Ra'anana | Metro West | 1,668 |
| Maccabi Rehovot | Rehovot | Barzilai Sports-Center | 700 |
| Maccabi Rishon LeZion | Rishon LeZion | Beit Maccabi Rishon | 2,500 |
| Otef Darom BC | Gaza Envelope | Rotem Hall, Kibutz Magen | 500 |

== Regular season ==
=== League table ===
| Pos | Team | Pld | W | L | PF | PA | PD | Pts | Qualification or relegation |
|---|---|---|---|---|---|---|---|---|---|
| 1 | Maccabi Ironi Ra'anana | 26 | 22 | 4 | 2291 | 2047 | +244 | 48 | Advance to the Top-teams League Group |
| 2 | Maccabi Rishon LeZion | 26 | 19 | 7 | 2195 | 1992 | +203 | 45 | Advance to the Top-teams League Group |
| 3 | Ironi Eilat | 26 | 18 | 8 | 2304 | 2118 | +186 | 44 | Advance to the Top-teams League Group |
| 4 | A.S. Ramat HaSharon | 26 | 16 | 10 | 2311 | 2162 | +149 | 42 | Advance to the Top-teams League Group |
| 5 | Ironi Nahariya | 26 | 15 | 11 | 2099 | 2057 | +42 | 41 | Advance to the Top-teams League Group |
| 6 | Elitzur Yavne | 26 | 14 | 12 | 2348 | 2240 | +108 | 40 | Advance to the Top-teams League Group |
| 7 | A.S. Elitzur Ashkelon | 26 | 14 | 12 | 2196 | 2159 | +37 | 40 | Advance to the Bottom-Teams League Group |
| 8 | S.C. Safed | 26 | 13 | 13 | 2051 | 2152 | −101 | 39 | Advance to the Bottom-Teams League Group |
| 9 | Maccabi Rehovot | 26 | 13 | 13 | 2054 | 2008 | +46 | 39 | Advance to the Bottom-Teams League Group |
| 10 | Hapoel Migdal HaEmek/Jezreel | 26 | 11 | 15 | 2172 | 2239 | −67 | 37 | Advance to the Bottom-Teams League Group |
| 11 | Hapoel Bnei Kafr Qasim | 26 | 10 | 16 | 2051 | 2251 | −200 | 36 | Advance to the Bottom-Teams League Group |
| 12 | Elitzur Shomron | 26 | 8 | 18 | 2183 | 2286 | −103 | 34 | Advance to the Bottom-Teams League Group |
| 13 | Hapoel Kfar Saba | 26 | 8 | 18 | 2216 | 2327 | −111 | 34 | Advance to the Bottom-Teams League Group |
| 14 | Otef Darom BC | 26 | 1 | 25 | 1967 | 2400 | −433 | 27 | Advance to the Bottom-Teams League Group |

=== Rounds 1 to 26 ===
| Home \ Away | ARH | EAS | ESH | EYV | DAR | FCS | HKQ | HMJ | HKS | IEI | INA | IRA | MRH | MRL |
|---|---|---|---|---|---|---|---|---|---|---|---|---|---|---|
| A.S. Ramat HaSharon | | 88–95 | 96–93 | 89–104 | 95–74 | 87–93 | 78–64 | 101–95 | 84–81 | 101–82 | 101–84 | 92–84 | 103–65 | 83–85 |
| A.S. Elitzur Ashkelon | 71–86 | | 86–77 | 93–88 | 93–69 | 103–84 | 84–94 | 87–86 | 95–85 | 76–91 | 71–64 | 59–77 | 100–95 | 73–94 |
| Elitzur Shomron | 76–101 | 101–96 | | 87–96 | 96–76 | 80–82 | 92–97 | 82–69 | 90–79 | 68–94 | 69–80 | 93–90 | 82–77 | 78–92 |
| Elitzur Yavne | 101–109 | 97–90 | 99–83 | | 92–85 | 90–64 | 92–85 | 85–96 | 117–80 | 86–94 | 97–78 | 91–96 | 70–74 | 81–94 |
| Otef Darom BC | 82–100 | 72–94 | 86–92 | 89–101 | | 72–100 | 82–89 | 86–93 | 59–84 | 78–94 | 73–94 | 68–85 | 80–66 | 72–86 |
| S.C. Safed | 74–79 | 60–76 | 79–76 | 100–98 | 87–75 | | 93–82 | 81–73 | 62–79 | 75–95 | 58–78 | 88–94 | 85–89 | 75–84 |
| Hapoel Bnei Kafr Qasim | 94–78 | 97–92 | 74–102 | 52–102 | 85–78 | 60–74 | | 74–72 | 88–99 | 86–103 | 69–79 | 70–79 | 56–74 | 76–67 |
| Hapoel Migdal HaEmek/Jezreel | 100–99 | 77–68 | 91–86 | 87–66 | 96–63 | 81–71 | 98–94 | | 77–98 | 91–105 | 68–73 | 70–84 | 67–82 | 88–83 |
| Hapoel Kfar Saba | 84–93 | 105–111 | 88–81 | 88–104 | 99–76 | 81–85 | 103–70 | 87–97 | | 94–102 | 97–93 | 77–99 | 65–91 | 70–87 |
| Ironi Eilat | 85–78 | 68–78 | 92–82 | 68–81 | 94–76 | 102–62 | 86–88 | 92–79 | 95–91 | | 93–68 | 83–94 | 85–77 | 85–70 |
| Ironi Nahariya | 68–82 | 97–94 | 100–78 | 97–79 | 80–69 | 79–83 | 84–81 | 98–72 | 87–81 | 83–70 | | 68–90 | 77–76 | 66–71 |
| Maccabi Ironi Ra'anana | 77–71 | 78–65 | 92–89 | 96–70 | 105–81 | 100–84 | 86–82 | 107–94 | 99–70 | 96–88 | 71–69 | | 75–63 | 95–90 |
| Maccabi Rehovot | 81–77 | 59–78 | 82–64 | 86–70 | 87–69 | 71–76 | 76–79 | 87–74 | 89–71 | 81–92 | 94–59 | 91–77 | | 65–86 |
| Maccabi Rishon LeZion | 70–60 | 69–68 | 92–86 | 80–90 | 113–77 | 70–76 | 98–65 | 97–81 | 96–80 | 79–66 | 70–93 | 81–67 | 91–76 | |

Legend: Blue = home team win; Red = away team win.
Matches with lighter background shading were decided after overtime.

== Top-teams League Group ==
| Pos | Team | Pld | W | L | PF | PA | PD | Pts | Qualification or relegation | IRA | IEI | MRL | ARH | INA | EYV |
|---|---|---|---|---|---|---|---|---|---|---|---|---|---|---|---|
| 1 | Maccabi Ironi Ra'anana | 31 | 25 | 6 | 2724 | 2464 | +260 | 56 | Promoted to the Premier League | | | 91–76 | 92–69 | | 97–79 |
| 2 | Ironi Eilat | 31 | 22 | 9 | 2741 | 2496 | +245 | 53 | Advance to the playoffs | 91–64 | | | 80–83 | | 95–83 |
| 3 | Maccabi Rishon LeZion | 31 | 22 | 9 | 2614 | 2389 | +225 | 53 | Advance to the playoffs | | 70–74 | | | 87–80 | 102–77 |
| 4 | A.S. Ramat HaSharon | 31 | 18 | 13 | 2705 | 2584 | +121 | 49 | Advance to the playoffs | | | 75–84 | | 69–70 | |
| 5 | Ironi Nahariya | 31 | 17 | 14 | 2510 | 2489 | +21 | 48 | Advance to the playoffs | 102–89 | 78–97 | | | | |
| 6 | Elitzur Yavne | 31 | 15 | 16 | 2773 | 2713 | +60 | 46 | Advance to the playoffs | | | | 96–98 | 90–81 | |

== Bottom-Teams League Group ==
| Pos | Team | Pld | W | L | PF | PA | PD | Pts | Qualification or relegation | EAS | MRH | HMJ | FCS | HKQ | ESH | HKS | DAR |
|---|---|---|---|---|---|---|---|---|---|---|---|---|---|---|---|---|---|
| 7 | A.S. Elitzur Ashkelon | 33 | 19 | 14 | 2804 | 2738 | +66 | 52 | Advance to the playoffs | | | 99–86 | 101–88 | | 94–82 | | 83–68 |
| 8 | Maccabi Rehovot | 33 | 17 | 16 | 2697 | 2587 | +110 | 50 | Advance to the playoffs | 106–71 | | 92–100 | | | 91–96 | | 79–70 |
| 9 | Hapoel Migdal HaEmek/Jezreel | 33 | 16 | 17 | 2801 | 2836 | −35 | 49 | Advance to the playoffs | | | | 110–93 | 64–84 | | 95–75 | 87–79 |
| 10 | S.C. Safed | 33 | 16 | 17 | 2651 | 2792 | −141 | 49 | | | 85–77 | | | 98–87 | | 76–97 | 81–75 |
| 11 | Hapoel Bnei Kafr Qasim | 33 | 13 | 20 | 2611 | 2811 | −200 | 46 | | 80–62 | 71–95 | | | | 94–82 | | |
| 12 | Elitzur Shomron | 33 | 12 | 21 | 2793 | 2899 | −106 | 45 | Relegation to Liga Artzit | | | 75–87 | 93–79 | | | 99–93 | |
| 13 | Hapoel Kfar Saba | 33 | 11 | 22 | 2801 | 2948 | −147 | 44 | Relegation to Liga Artzit | 69–98 | 86–103 | | | 74–63 | | | |
| 14 | Otef Darom BC | 33 | 2 | 31 | 2506 | 2985 | −479 | 35 | Can't Relegated (Note: Israeli Basketball Association decided that the team from Gaza Envelope cannot be promoted or relegated.) | | | | | 85–81 | 75–83 | 87–91 | |

== Playoffs ==
Quarterfinals
2 | Ironi Eilat | 104 | 98 | – | 2
9 | Hapoel Migdal HaEmek/Jezreel | 79 | 75 | – | 0
5 | Ironi Nahariya | 88 | 97 | – | 2
6 | Elitzur Yavne | 84 | 84 | – | 0
3 | Maccabi Rishon LeZion | 73 | 96 | – | 2
8 | Maccabi Rehovot | 70 | 82 | – | 0
4 | A.S. Ramat HaSharon | 107 | 84 | 87 | 1
7 | A.S. Elitzur Ashkelon | 105 | 94 | 90 | 2

Semifinals
2 | Ironi Eilat | 100 | 99 | – | 2
5 | Ironi Nahariya | 86 | 72 | – | 0
3 | Maccabi Rishon LeZion | 69 | 86 | 96 | 2
7 | A.S. Elitzur Ashkelon | 75 | 69 | 72 | 1

Finals
2 | Ironi Eilat | 92 | 77 | 89 | 87 | 75 | 2
3 | Maccabi Rishon LeZion | 94 | 74 | 76 | 92 | 89 | 3

=== Quarterfinals ===
==== Game 1 ====
| 28 April | Ironi Eilat | 104–79 (Series: 1–0) | Hapoel Migdal HaEmek/Jezreel | Eilat |
| 18:40 | Scoring by quarter: 22–22, 27–15, 27–28, 28–14 |
| | Pts: Gutt 20; Rebs: Porat 8 Asts: Gutt, Tilghman 6 PIR: Gutt 27 | Boxscore | Pts: Edwards 26; Rebs: Edwards 12; Asts: Shabat 8 PIR: Edwards 35 | Arena: Begin Arena |

| 28 April | Ironi Nahariya | 88–84 (Series: 1–0) | Elitzur Yavne | Nahariya |
| 19:00 | Scoring by quarter: 16–24, 32–21, 22–14, 18–25 |
| | Pts: Binyamin, Turell 17; Rebs: Turell 13; Asts: Frazier 9 PIR: Turell 26 | Boxscore | Pts: Tabb 19; Rebs: Abaev 14; Asts: Gilinski 10; PIR: Abaev 35 | Arena: Ein Sara Sport Hall |

| 27 April | Maccabi Rishon LeZion | 73–70 (Series: 1–0) | Maccabi Rehovot | Rishon LeZion |
| 19:30 | Scoring by quarter: 17–22, 21–20, 17–14, 18–14 |
| | Pts: Grant 28; Rebs: Freund 10; Asts: Grant 6 PIR: Grant 30 | Boxscore | Pts: Treadwell 16; Rebs: Treadwell 7 Asts: David 5 PIR: Treadwell 23 | Arena: Beit Maccabi Rishon |

| 27 April | A.S. Ramat HaSharon | 107–105(OT) (Series: 1–0) | A.S. Elitzur Ashkelon | Ramat HaSharon |
| 18:40 | Scoring by quarter: 24–29, 24–15, 26–20, 17–27, Overtime: 10–8 |
| | Pts: Lee 29; Rebs: Lee 10; Asts: Williams 14; PIR: Lee 40 | Boxscore | Pts: Cohen 27; Rebs: Riley 17; Asts: Najar 11; PIR: Cohen 25 | Arena: Kiryat Yearim Hall |

==== Game 2 ====
| 5 May | Hapoel Migdal HaEmek/Jezreel | 75–98 (Series: 0–2) | Ironi Eilat | Migdal HaEmek |
| 19:00 | Scoring by quarter: 13–26, 25–14, 22–32, 15–26 |
| | Pts: Edwards 18; Rebs: Edwards 7 Asts: Shabat 8 PIR: Edwards 26 | Boxscore | Pts: Porat 29; Rebs: Porat 7 Asts: Tilghman 9 PIR: Porat 33 | Arena: Yearot HaEmek |

| 4 May | Elitzur Yavne | 84–97 (Series: 0–2) | Ironi Nahariya | Yavne |
| 18:10 | Scoring by quarter: 14–34, 22–21, 20–24, 28–18 |
| | Pts: Tabb 22; Rebs: Abaev 12; Asts: Gilinski 21; PIR: Gilinski 31 | Boxscore | Pts: Griffin 26; Rebs: Levinson 11; Asts: Frazier 8 PIR: Griffin 31 | Arena: Ralf Klain Hall |

| 2 May | Maccabi Rehovot | 85–96 (Series: 0–2) | Maccabi Rishon LeZion | Rehovot |
| 13:00 | Scoring by quarter: 21–21, 13–23, 21–24, 30–28 |
| | Pts: Treadwell 19; Rebs: Treadwell 15; Asts: Threatt, Drapic 4 PIR: Treadwell 33 | Boxscore | Pts: Grant 22; Rebs: Burns, Freund 6 Asts: Grant, Reuven 5 PIR: Grant 26 | Arena: Barzilai Sports-Center |

| 2 May | A.S. Elitzur Ashkelon | 94–84 (Series: 1–1) | A.S. Ramat HaSharon | Ashkelon |
| 13:30 | Scoring by quarter: 29–17, 19–22, 20–19, 26–26 |
| | Pts: Berman 22; Rebs: Riley 12; Asts: Najar 8 PIR: Riley 31 | Boxscore | Pts: Williams 18; Rebs: Lee 14; Asts: Williams 9 PIR: Williams 22 | Arena: Ashkelon Sports Arena |

==== Game 3 ====
| 6 May | A.S. Ramat HaSharon | 87–90 (Series: 1–2) | A.S. Elitzur Ashkelon | Ramat HaSharon |
| 19:00 | Scoring by quarter: 27–19, 22–25, 18–21, 20–25 |
| | Pts: Lee 33; Rebs: Lee 17; Asts: Williams 9 PIR: Lee 45 | Boxscore | Pts: Cohen 20; Rebs: Riley 10; Asts: Najar 10; PIR: Riley 22 | Arena: Kiryat Yearim Hall |

=== Semifinals ===
==== Game 1 ====
| 14 May | Ironi Eilat | 100–86 (Series: 1–0) | Ironi Nahariya | Eilat |
| 18:30 | Scoring by quarter: 23–19, 22–24, 24–26, 31–17 |
| | Pts: Hannahs 25; Rebs: Porat 11; Asts: Tilghman 7 PIR: Hannahs 30 | Boxscore | Pts: Binyamin 21; Rebs: Levinson, Griffin 6 Asts: Frazier 7 PIR: Binyamin 21 | Arena: Begin Arena |

| 13 May | Maccabi Rishon LeZion | 69–75 (Series: 0–1) | A.S. Elitzur Ashkelon | Rishon LeZion |
| 18:30 | Scoring by quarter: 22–17, 22–18, 10–23, 15–17 |
| | Pts: Burns 18; Rebs: Freund 8 Asts: Grant 10; PIR: Burns 21 | Boxscore | Pts: Riley 24; Rebs: Riley 15; Asts: Najar 7 PIR: Riley 38 | Arena: Beit Maccabi Rishon; Referees: Zahi Habdali, Rotem Kuza, Idan Stein |

==== Game 2 ====
| 18 May | Ironi Nahariya | 72–99 (Series: 0–2) | Ironi Eilat | Nahariya |
| 18:30 | Scoring by quarter: 12–26, 20–23, 16–25, 24–25 |
| | Pts: Griffin 25; Rebs: Griffin 10; Asts: Frazier 5 PIR: Griffin 31 | Boxscore | Pts: Hannahs 26; Rebs: Huffman 11; Asts: Akrish 5 PIR: Huffman 26 | Arena: Ein Sara Sport Hall |

| 16 May | A.S. Elitzur Ashkelon | 69–86 (Series: 1–1) | Maccabi Rishon LeZion | Ashkelon |
| 13:30 | Scoring by quarter: 13–26, 14–13, 17–24, 25–23 |
| | Pts: Berman 14; Rebs: Riley 9 Asts: Najar 10; PIR: Riley 22 | Boxscore | Pts: Romanov 23; Rebs: Burns 16; Asts: Grant 7 PIR: Burns 39 | Arena: Ashkelon Sports Arena |

==== Game 3 ====
| 20 May | Maccabi Rishon LeZion | 96–72 (Series: 2–1) | A.S. Elitzur Ashkelon | Rishon LeZion |
| 20:30 | Scoring by quarter: 24–14, 20–13, 29–24, 23–21 |
| | Pts: Burns 30; Rebs: Burns 10; Asts: Grant 6 PIR: Burns 50 | Boxscore | Pts: Riley 15; Rebs: Riley 8 Asts: Najar 15; PIR: Riley 18 | Arena: Beit Maccabi Rishon |

=== Finals ===
| 26 May Game 1 | Ironi Eilat | 92–94 (Series: 0–1) | Maccabi Rishon LeZion | Eilat |
| 18:45 | Scoring by quarter: 21–19, 23–21, 16–24, 32–30 |
| | Pts: Hannahs 24; Rebs: Tilghman 9 Asts: Tilghman 8 PIR: Tilghman 28 | Boxscore | Pts: Grant 31; Rebs: Grant 7 Asts: Burns, Grant 5 PIR: Grant 37 | Arena: Begin Arena |

| 29 May Game 2 | Maccabi Rishon LeZion | 74–77 (Series: 1–1) | Ironi Eilat | Rishon LeZion |
| 19:40 | Scoring by quarter: 11–19, 18–23, 26–13, 19–22 |
| | Pts: Reuven 19; Rebs: Burns 7 Asts: Burns 6 PIR: Reuven 14 | Boxscore | Pts: Tilghman, Gutt 18; Rebs: Tilghman, Huffman 9 Asts: Tilghman 5 PIR: Tilghman 30 | Arena: Beit Maccabi Rishon |

| 4 June Game 3 | Ironi Eilat | 89–76 (Series: 2–1) | Maccabi Rishon LeZion | Eilat |
| 19:30 | Scoring by quarter: 15–21, 30–12, 24–23, 20–20 |
| | Pts: Eisendorf 20; Rebs: Porat, Huffman 8 Asts: Gutt 10; PIR: Porat 24 | Boxscore | Pts: Freund 21; Rebs: Burns 12; Asts: Grant 8 PIR: Burns 19 | Arena: Begin Arena |

| 8 June Game 4 | Maccabi Rishon LeZion | 92–87 (Series: 2–2) | Ironi Eilat | Rishon LeZion |
| 20:00 | Scoring by quarter: 24–21, 19–21, 21–18, 28–27 |
| | Pts: Burns 26; Rebs: Freund 9 Asts: Grant, Romanov 6 PIR: Grant 30 | Boxscore | Pts: Tilghman 17; Rebs: Huffman 8 Asts: Gutt 5 PIR: Three players 13 | Arena: Beit Maccabi Rishon |

| 11 June Game 5 | Ironi Eilat | 75–89 (Series: 2–3) | Maccabi Rishon LeZion | Eilat |
| 20:00 | Scoring by quarter: 19–24, 20–16, 23–19, 13–30 |
| | Pts: Hannahs 30; Rebs: Porat 14; Asts: Tilghman, Gutt 7 PIR: Porat 17 | Boxscore | Pts: Grant 31; Rebs: Freund 10; Asts: Grant, Romanov 4 PIR: Grant 39 | Arena: Begin Arena |
