= Hiwassee College =

Methodist college in Madisonville, Tennessee, US (1849–2019)

- Seal of Hiwassee College
- Motto: Doctrina, Fide, Servus
- Motto in English: "Learning, Faith, Service"
- Type: Private college
- Active: 1849–2019
- Religious affiliation: United Methodist Church
- Location: Madisonville, Tennessee, United States; 35.559°N 84.364°W
- Campus: Rural
- Colors: Maroon and Gold
- Nickname: Tigers
- Sporting affiliations: NCCAA Division I - Mideast Region
- Website: www.hiwassee.edu (Archived)

Hiwassee College was a private college in Madisonville, Tennessee, United States. Founded in 1849, the college offered associate degrees as well as bachelor's degrees. The majority of its associate degree graduates went on to complete bachelor's degrees elsewhere. The college closed on May 10, 2019, due to financial issues.

== History ==
Hiwassee College's predecessor, an all-boys school, Tullagalla Academy, was founded in 1826. Its original home was 5 miles away from the present campus. In 1845, after enrollment had grown too large for its location, the school moved to the Methodist Bat Creek Campground. After the departure of the academy's director in 1848, five Methodists came together to reorganize the school as a college in the same location. Hiwassee College was officially organized in 1849, making it the oldest private two-year college in Tennessee until its closure in 2019. Despite its Methodist roots, the college's first president was Presbyterian Robert E. Doak. The college's first valedictorian was David M. Key, the future United States Postmaster General and U.S. Senator from Tennessee.

In 1854, John Hamilton Brunner became the second president of Hiwassee College. Brunner made the decision to close the college from 1861 to 1865 during the Civil War. In 1870, Francis Grace became president of the college; however, Brunner returned in 1872 and remained president until 1883.

During most of the 1880s, Hiwassee was associated with Victoria College for women in nearby Sweetwater, Tennessee. In 1891, Sidney Gilbreath would become president. Under his tenure, the college opened to women in 1894. In 1899, he was succeeded by Joseph E. Lowry. Under his tenure, Lawrence Hall dormitory was added and the college officially affiliated with the United Methodist Church. Electricity was first available on campus in 1917, and the Massey home, the New Administration building, and Key Chapel were all built. In 1924, Martin Reedy took over as president and oversaw the construction of the Gymnasium. Under the tenure of President Rudy Youell, the dining hall, Rawlings home, and Rymer Hall were built.

In 1955, Dr. Horace N. Barker became president of the college. Under his leadership, most of the current buildings on campus were constructed including the Lundy Science Hall (1961), the Rudy Youell Physical Education Facility (1965), Allison Hall dormitory (1965), Tom Black Hall dormitory (1965), the Barker Learning Center (1969), and Buckner Memorial Chapel (1969). The Barker Learning Center is named for him He retired in 1980. During Barker's tenure, Dr. James H. Amburgey served as the academic dean at the college. Upon Barker's retirement, Amburgey became the college president and served until 1984. Following Amburgey was Dr. Stephen Fritz.

In 2003, Dr. James A. Noseworthy became the college's 21st president. Hiwassee College was accredited with the Southern Association of Colleges and Schools, but in 2008 their accreditation was withdrawn. Noseworthy sought to save the school, despite its troubles. During this time, it went from 400 students to only 100. On November 3, 2009 it attained candidacy status for accreditation as a Category II institution by the Transnational Association of Christian Colleges and Schools (TRACS). Noseworthy retired in April 2010.

In 2011, Dr. Robin Tricoli was named the 22nd President of Hiwassee College. Under her tenure, the college attained full accreditation through TRACS in October 2013 and reaffirmed in 2018.

=== Affiliation with the Methodist Church ===
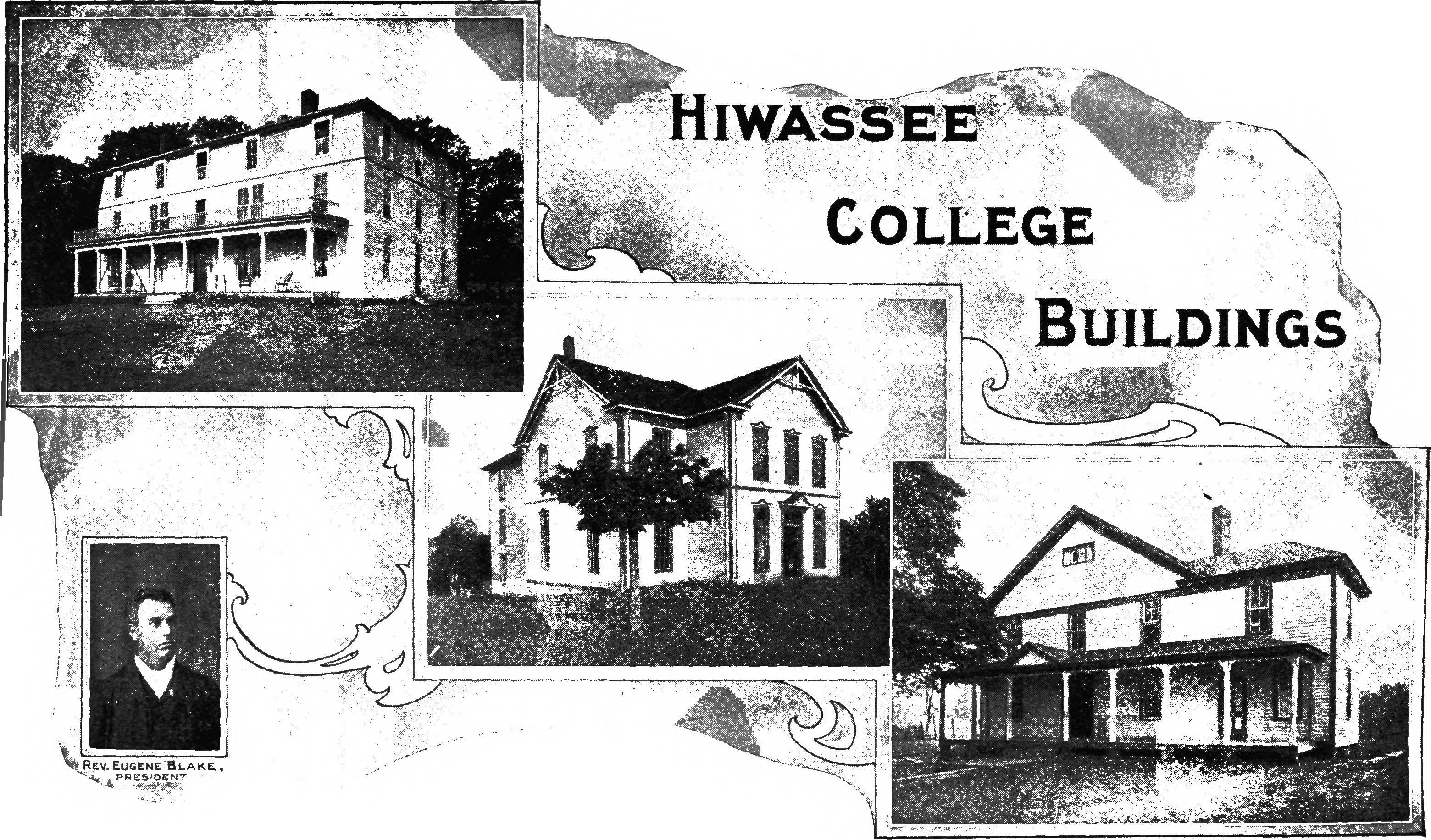
Photo from the book Holston Methodism

Although closely tied to the Methodist Church since its founding, it was not until 1908 that the Trustees of Hiwassee College and the Holston Conference of the Methodist Episcopal Church, South entered into an agreement for joint operation of the institution. Hiwassee College came under the complete control and ownership of the Methodist Church-South in 1937, shortly before its reunion with its northern counterpart in 1939. Prior to 1980, the three United Methodist-related colleges in the Holston Conference (a geographic region that includes East Tennessee and small parts of southwest Virginia and north Georgia) were governed by a unified board of trustees. In 1980, the Board of Trustees established a separate Board of Governors for each institution, and by 1990, each of the three colleges operated under a separate, independent board of trustees.

=== Closure and aftermath ===
The college closed on May 10, 2019 due to financial issues. Students and alumni protested the announcement of the closure and many parents of enrolled students raised concerns about the lack of communication from the board of trustees. Neighboring colleges, including Maryville College, Pellissippi State Community College, and South College offered students transfer assistance.

The Hiwassee College Alumni Association Inc. (HCAA) submitted a non-cash offer for the college and its debt in July 2019 with hopes of reopening the college. The campus was put up for sale on January 2, 2020 for $8.6 million dollars. The offering Memorandum states, "The Trustees of Hiwassee College now intend to divest the real property owned by the college, and as such are offering the property for sale."

In January 2020, a former trustee of the college, William Harmon, a Maryville, Tennessee doctor, sued the college for return of his $100,000 donation earmarked for construction of a new library which was to be named in his honor. According to its website, Harmon was the college's board of trustees secretary. Harmon wants the Monroe County, Tennessee Chancery Court to find that the donation must paid back to him once the college sells. In light of the suit, the Comptroller of the Treasury of Tennessee conducted an investigation of the college. The investigative report found "operating deficiencies related to disbursements, travel reimbursements, and the release of restrictions on monetary gifts."

The land and buildings were listed for sale with an asking price of $6 million. They were sold to the Bruderhof in late 2020.

== Campus ==
Hiwassee College's campus grew from the original 7 acres (28,000 m^{2}) donated by Reverend Daniel B. Carter to a campus comprising 18 buildings situated on 60 acres (240,000 m^{2}) of a 400-acre (1,600,000 m^{2}) tract of land located one mile (1.6 km) north of the town of Madisonville.

== Organization and administration ==
Hiwassee College was listed by the University Senate of the United Methodist Church. The Senate is an elected body of professionals in higher education created by the General Conference to determine which schools, colleges, universities, and theological schools meet the criteria for listing as institutions affiliated with the United Methodist Church.

== Academics ==
The college offered a variety of university-parallel and career/vocational programs leading to the Associate of Arts, Associate of Science, Associate of Applied Science, Bachelor of Arts, or Bachelor of Science degrees.

== Athletics ==
The Hiwassee athletic teams were called the Tigers. The college was a member of the Division I ranks of the National Christian College Athletic Association (NCCAA) until after the 2018–19 academic year. The school competed as an Independent in the Mideast Region.

Hiwassee competed in 12 intercollegiate varsity sports: Men's sports included baseball, basketball, cross country, golf, shooting and soccer; while women's sports included basketball, cross country, cheerleading, soccer, softball and volleyball.

== Notable alumni ==
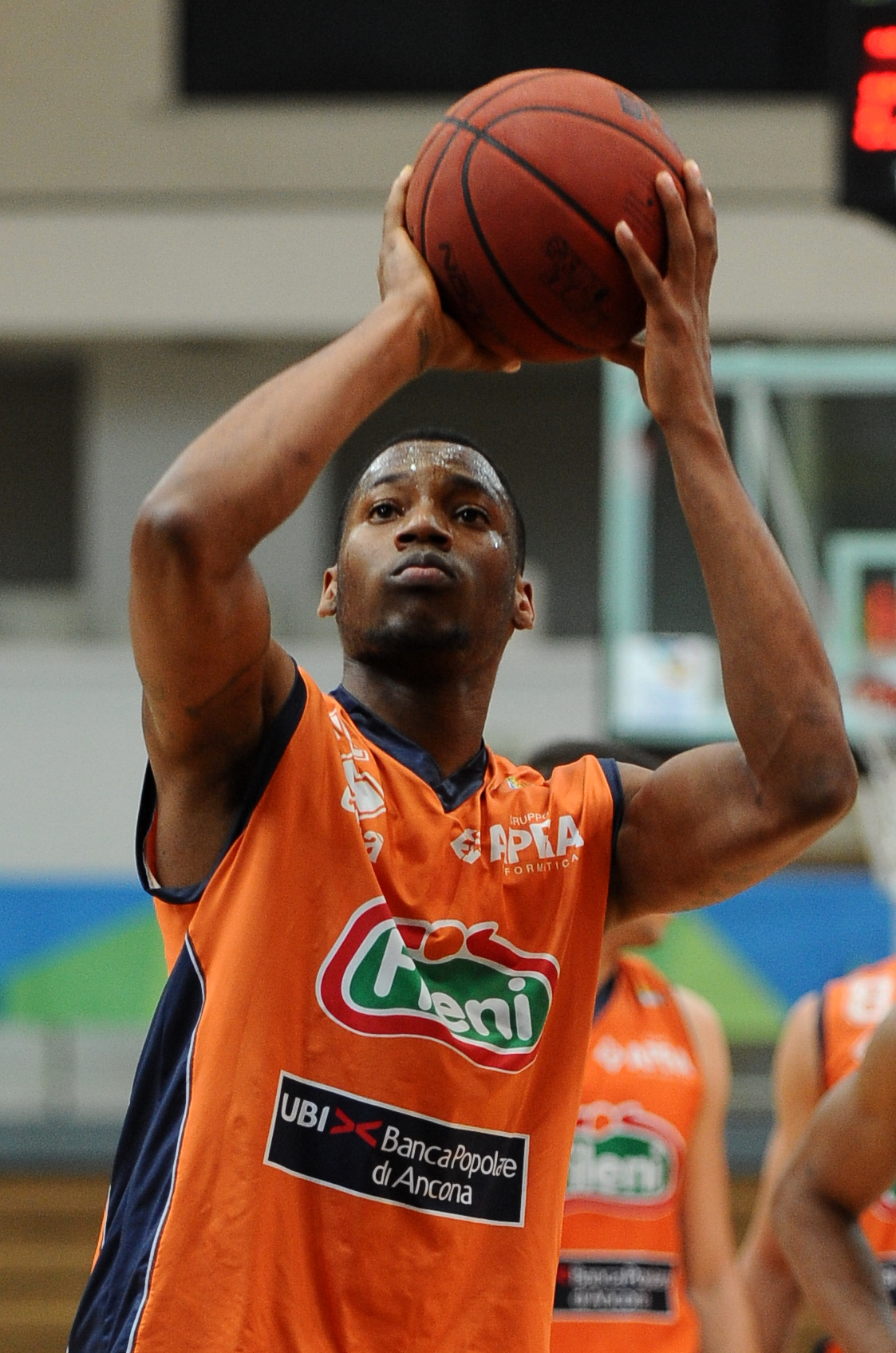
Eric Griffin

- Antonio Burks, professional basketball player
- Alexander Stephens Clay, former U.S. Senator
- Isaac Cline, founder of the US Weather Bureau
- Eric Griffin (born 1990), basketball player in the Israeli Basketball Premier League
- David M. Key, former U.S. Senator and Postmaster General
- Orlando Lightfoot, former professional basketball player
- Albert H. Roberts, former Governor of Tennessee
