= 2017 NBA Summer League =

- League: National Basketball Association
- Sport: Basketball
- Duration: July 1–17, 2017
- Games: 93 total games Orlando-20; Utah-6; Las Vegas-67
- Teams: Orlando-8; Utah-4; Las Vegas-24
- TV partner(s): NBA TV & ESPN

Orlando Pro Summer League
- Season champions: Dallas Mavericks
- Runners-up: Detroit Pistons
- Top scorer: Okaro White

Utah Jazz Summer League
- Season champions: Utah Jazz
- Runners-up: San Antonio Spurs
- Top scorer: Bryn Forbes

Las Vegas NBA Summer League
- Season champions: Los Angeles Lakers
- Runners-up: Portland Trail Blazers
- Top seed: Toronto Raptors
- Season MVP: Lonzo Ball (league); Kyle Kuzma (championship game)
- Top scorer: Donovan Mitchell

NBA Summer League seasons
- ← 2016 2018 →

The 2017 NBA Summer League consisted of three pro basketball leagues organized by the National Basketball Association (NBA): the Orlando Pro Summer League, Utah Jazz Summer League, and Las Vegas Summer League.

Eight teams participated in the week-long Orlando Pro Summer League at Amway Center in Orlando, Florida, from July 1 to 6, 2017. Each team played five games over the course of the week, with a championship day being played on the final day of the league. The Dallas Mavericks and Miami Heat also participated in the Las Vegas Summer League.

Four teams participated in the round-robin format of the Utah Jazz Summer League from July 3 to 6, 2017. All four teams (Utah Jazz, Boston Celtics, Philadelphia 76ers, and San Antonio Spurs) also participated in the Las Vegas Summer League.

The Las Vegas NBA Summer League is the official summer league of the National Basketball Association. It is the premier summer league of the three, with a total of 24 participating. A total of 67 games was played from July 7 to 17, 2017, at the Thomas & Mack Center and Cox Pavilion, both located in Paradise, Nevada (near Las Vegas).

== Orlando Pro Summer League ==
Officially known as the Mountain Dew Orlando Pro Summer League for sponsorship reasons, this 20-game, week-long event will feature eight teams. Each team will play five games over the six-day event, with a championship day being played on the final day of the league. A point system will establish the standings leading up to the final day, with eight points awarded each game based on: four points for winning the game and one point for winning a quarter (in the event of a tied quarter, each team will receive 0.5 points). In the event of ties in seeding heading into championship day, three tiebreakers will be in place: 1) total point differential; 2) total points allowed; 3) coin flip.

=== Teams ===
- Orlando Magic (host)
- Charlotte Hornets
- Dallas Mavericks
- Detroit Pistons
- Indiana Pacers
- Miami Heat
- New York Knicks
- Oklahoma City Thunder

=== Orlando Schedule ===
All times are in Eastern Daylight Time (UTC−4)

==== Day 1 ====
NBA TV

July 1
11:00 am

Boxscore

Charlotte Hornets 74, Miami Heat 67
Scoring by quarter: 27–18, 17–16, 16–18, 14–15
Pts: Weber 17; Rebs: Graham 13; Asts: Graham 5	Pts: White 20; Rebs: Adebayo 10; Asts: Perrantes 4

Amway Center, Orlando, Florida

NBA TV

July 1
1:00 pm

Boxscore

Orlando Magic 74, Indiana Pacers 85
Scoring by quarter: 16–23, 10–21, 30–20, 18–21
Pts: three players 10; Rebs: Isaac 8 Asts: Costello, Lucas 4	Pts: Leslie 20; Rebs: Johnson 12; Asts: Young 6

Amway Center, Orlando, Florida

NBA TV

July 1
3:00 pm

Boxscore

New York Knicks 75, Dallas Mavericks 80
Scoring by quarter: 16–25, 26–17, 19–17, 14–21
Pts: Randle; Rebs: Dotson 8 Asts: Rathan-Mayes 5	Pts: Buycks 16; Rebs: Warney 8 Asts: Buycks 6

Amway Center, Orlando, Florida

NBA TV

July 1
5:00 pm

Boxscore

Oklahoma City Thunder 92, Detroit Pistons 91
Scoring by quarter: 20–28, 23–23, 19–18, 30–22
Pts: Hunter 21; Rebs: Johnson 10; Asts: Christon 8	Pts: Ellenson 21; Rebs: Moreland 11; Asts: four players 3

Amway Center, Orlando, Florida

==== Day 2 ====
NBA TV

July 2
1:00 pm

Boxscore

New York Knicks 78, Detroit Pistons 103
Scoring by quarter: 16–26, 15–24, 16–27, 31–26
Pts: Randle 16; Rebs: Labeyrie 11; Asts: Dotson 4	Pts: Moreland 15; Rebs: Ellenson 7 Asts: Jackson 7

Amway Center, Orlando, Florida

NBA TV

July 2
3:00 pm

Boxscore

Orlando Magic 81, Miami Heat 68
Scoring by quarter: 32–9, 14–25, 16–17, 19–17
Pts: Isaac 15; Rebs: Isaac 13; Asts: Walton 3	Pts: White 16; Rebs: Adebayo 9 Asts: Perrantes 8

Amway Center, Orlando, Florida

NBA TV

July 2
5:00 pm

Boxscore

Indiana Pacers 84, Charlotte Hornets 77
Scoring by quarter: 16–17, 29–20, 14–18, 25–22
Pts: Leslie 16; Rebs: Johnson 6 Asts: Young 6	Pts: Graham 16; Rebs: Gill 5 Asts: O'Bryant III 4

Amway Center, Orlando, Florida

==== Day 3 ====
NBA TV

July 3
1:00 pm

Boxscore

New York Knicks 87, Oklahoma City Thunder 99
Scoring by quarter: 16–25, 28–30, 20–24, 23–20
Pts: Randle 20; Rebs: Dotson 5 Asts: Rathan-Mayes 4	Pts: Huestis 26; Rebs: Huestis 7 Asts: Hamilton 9

Amway Center, Orlando, Florida

NBA TV

July 3
3:00 pm

Boxscore

Orlando Magic 76, Dallas Mavericks 86
Scoring by quarter: 28–15, 11–24, 17–28, 20–19
Pts: Georges-Hunt 20; Rebs: Costello 9 Asts: Walton 5	Pts: Buycks 20; Rebs: Ashley 8 Asts: Wood, Warney 3

Amway Center, Orlando, Florida

NBA TV

July 3
5:00 pm

Boxscore

Indiana Pacers 86, Miami Heat 83
Scoring by quarter: 23–23, 13–23, 25–17, 25–20
Pts: Leaf 19; Rebs: Leaf 10; Asts: Young 6	Pts: Adebayo 29; Rebs: Adebayo 11; Asts: Odum 7

Amway Center, Orlando, Florida

==== Day 4 ====
NBA TV

July 4
1:00 pm

Boxscore

Charlotte Hornets 95, Oklahoma City Thunder 81
Scoring by quarter: 16–23, 33–17, 25–20, 21–21
Pts: Graham 19; Rebs: Graham 8 Asts: Corbin 3	Pts: Hunter 16; Rebs: Hunter 10; Asts: Hamilton 7

Amway Center, Orlando, Florida

NBA TV

July 4
3:00 pm

Boxscore

Indiana Pacers 79, Dallas Mavericks 94
Scoring by quarter: 24–12, 19–27, 18–31, 18–24
Pts: Stokes 15; Rebs: Stokes 7 Asts: Loyd 6	Pts: Warney 17; Rebs: Warney 4 Asts: Buycks 5

Amway Center, Orlando, Florida

NBA TV

July 4
5:00 pm

Boxscore

Miami Heat 71, Detroit Pistons 73 (2OT)
Scoring by quarter: 9–24, 11–10, 30–16, 21–21, Overtime: 0–0, 0–2
Pts: White 29; Rebs: Auguste 12; Asts: Perrantes 4	Pts: Ellenson, Kennard 18; Rebs: Moreland 10; Asts: Jackson 5

Amway Center, Orlando, Florida

==== Day 5 ====
NBA TV

July 5
1:00 pm

Boxscore

Dallas Mavericks 96, Oklahoma City Thunder 75
Scoring by quarter: 35–12, 10–18, 32–24, 19–21
Pts: Paul 20; Rebs: Paul 6 Asts: Montero 5	Pts: Johnson 18; Rebs: Huestis, Morin 7 Asts: Christon 8

Amway Center, Orlando, Florida

NBA TV

July 5
3:00 pm

Boxscore

Charlotte Hornets 82, Detroit Pistons 87
Scoring by quarter: 23–20, 13–18, 24–25, 22–24
Pts: O'Bryant III 26; Rebs: Mathiang 7 Asts: Weber 7	Pts: Ellenson 29; Rebs: Moreland 7 Asts: Jackson 6

Amway Center, Orlando, Florida

NBA TV

July 5
5:00 pm

Boxscore

Orlando Magic 84, New York Knicks 73
Scoring by quarter: 23–19, 21–18, 18–20, 22–16
Pts: Lucas 20; Rebs: Martin 7 Asts: Lucas 7	Pts: Artis 13; Rebs: Plumlee 9 Asts: Dotson 4

Amway Center, Orlando, Florida

=== Championship day ===
Each team will play one game on the league's final day for either first, third, fifth or seventh place.

Seeding Criteria

The seeding will be determined by a team's total points after the first five days. Eight points will be awarded in each game: four points for winning a game and one point for every quarter a team won. In the event of a tied quarter, each team is awarded half a point. If two or more teams had equal points, then the following tiebreakers applied:

1. Total point differential
2. Least total points allowed
3. Coin flip

Each odd-numbered seed will be paired with the team seeded immediately below it. For example, the top two seeds will play in the championship game, the third and fourth seeds will play in the third-place game, etc.

==== Standings/seedings ====
#	Team	GP	W	L	PTS	Tiebreaker Notes
1	Dallas Mavericks	4	4	0	25	
2	Detroit Pistons	4	3	1	21	
3	Indiana Pacers	4	3	1	20.5	
4	Oklahoma City Thunder	4	2	2	17	
5	Orlando Magic	4	2	2	16	
6	Charlotte Hornets	4	2	2	15.5	
7	Miami Heat	4	0	4	8	
8	New York Knicks	4	0	4	5	

==== Championship Day Schedule ====
All times are in Eastern Daylight Time (UTC−4)

===== Seventh-place game =====
NBA TV

July 6
8:00 am

Boxscore

New York Knicks 91, Miami Heat 72
Scoring by quarter: 22–14, 26–16, 21–20, 22–22
Pts: Dotson 20; Rebs: Dotson 9 Asts: Artis, Dotson 4	Pts: Williams 14; Rebs: White 12; Asts: Clavell 4

Amway Center, Orlando, Florida

===== Fifth-place game =====
NBA TV

July 6
10:00 am

Boxscore

Charlotte Hornets 86, Orlando Magic 78
Scoring by quarter: 21–22, 20–10, 24–23, 21–23
Pts: Bacon 29; Rebs: Bacon 8 Asts: Weber 2	Pts: Karnowski 20; Rebs: Karnowski 9 Asts: Gray 4

Amway Center, Orlando, Florida

===== Third-place game =====
NBA TV

July 6
12:00 pm

Boxscore

Oklahoma City Thunder 80, Indiana Pacers 89
Scoring by quarter: 11–16, 24–17, 18–23, 27–33
Pts: Christon 21; Rebs: Hamilton 7 Asts: Hamilton 8	Pts: Stokes, Long 17; Rebs: Loyd 10; Asts: Loyd 6

Amway Center, Orlando, Florida

===== Championship =====
NBA TV

July 6
2:00 pm

Boxscore

Detroit Pistons 81, Dallas Mavericks 83 (OT)
Scoring by quarter: 19–18, 23–19, 27–22, 5–15, Overtime: 7–9
Pts: Kennard 24; Rebs: Ellenson, Moreland 8 Asts: Jackson 8	Pts: Buycks 28; Rebs: Motley 10; Asts: Buycks 8

Amway Center, Orlando, Florida

=== Final standings ===
#	Team	GP	W	L	PCT
1	Dallas Mavericks	5	5	0	1.000
2	Detroit Pistons	5	3	2	.600
3	Indiana Pacers	5	4	1	.800
4	Oklahoma City Thunder	5	2	3	.400
5	Charlotte Hornets	5	3	2	.600
6	Orlando Magic	5	2	3	.400
7	New York Knicks	5	1	4	.200
8	Miami Heat	5	0	5	.000

=== Statistical leaders ===
Points

Player	Team	PPG
Okaro White	Miami Heat	19.0
Dakari Johnson	Oklahoma City Thunder	18.0
Dwight Buycks	Dallas Mavericks	17.8
Treveon Graham	Charlotte Hornets	17.7
Bam Adebayo	Miami Heat	17.5

Rebounds

Player	Team	RPG
Eric Moreland	Detroit Pistons	8.4
Treveon Graham	Charlotte Hornets	8.3
Bam Adebayo	Miami Heat	8.3
Jonathan Isaac	Orlando Magic	8.0
Okaro White	Miami Heat	8.0

Assists

Player	Team	APG
Daniel Hamilton	Oklahoma City Thunder	6.8
Semaj Christon	Oklahoma City Thunder	6.0
Joe Young	Indiana Pacers	5.8
Pierre Jackson	Detroit Pistons	5.8
London Perrantes	Miami Heat	4.8

== Utah Jazz Summer League ==
In its now third year, the Utah Jazz Summer League will host four teams. Each team will play each other in a round-robin format for a total of six games, with each team playing each day (July 3, 5, and 6).

=== Teams ===
- Boston Celtics
- Philadelphia 76ers
- San Antonio Spurs
- Utah Jazz

=== Utah Schedule ===
All times are in Mountain Daylight Time (UTC–6)

==== Day 1 ====
NBA TV

July 3
5:00 pm

Boxscore

Boston Celtics 89, Philadelphia 76ers 88
Scoring by quarter: 24–22, 20–22, 20–27, 25–17
Pts: Brown 29; Rebs: Brown 12; Asts: Jackson, Tatum 3	Pts: Fultz 17; Rebs: Poythress 8 Asts: Luwawu-Cabarrot, Drew II 5

Jon M. Huntsman Center, Salt Lake City, Utah

NBA TV

July 3
7:00 pm

Boxscore

San Antonio Spurs 74, Utah Jazz 87
Scoring by quarter: 19–26, 18–19, 18–23, 19–19
Pts: White 13; Rebs: Jefferson 10; Asts: Murray 5	Pts: Mitchell 23; Rebs: Wright 8 Asts: Exum, Mitchell 5

Jon M. Huntsman Center, Salt Lake City, Utah

==== Day 2 ====
NBA TV

July 5
5:00 pm

Boxscore

Boston Celtics 70, San Antonio Spurs 81
Scoring by quarter: 18–23, 16–20, 15–25, 21–13
Pts: Tatum 23; Rebs: Tatum 10; Asts: Smith 3	Pts: Forbes 31; Rebs: Murray 10; Asts: Murray 4

Jon M. Huntsman Center, Salt Lake City, Utah

NBA TV

July 5
7:00 pm

Boxscore

Philadelphia 76ers 94, Utah Jazz 100
Scoring by quarter: 16–22, 21–28, 26–27, 31–23
Pts: Fultz 23; Rebs: Poythress 8 Asts: Fultz 5	Pts: Exum 26; Rebs: Griffin 8 Asts: Exum 10

Jon M. Huntsman Center, Salt Lake City, Utah

==== Day 3 ====
NBA TV

July 6
5:00 pm

Boxscore

Philadelphia 76ers 94, San Antonio Spurs 86
Scoring by quarter: 23–21, 16–18, 29–31, 26–16
Pts: Miles 18; Rebs: Bolden 8 Asts: Drew II 5	Pts: Forbes 21; Rebs: Bertans, Blossomgame 7 Asts: Bertans 4

Jon M. Huntsman Center, Salt Lake City, Utah

NBA TV

July 6
7:00 pm

Boxscore

Boston Celtics 65, Utah Jazz 68
Scoring by quarter: 18–11, 16–18, 20–17, 11–22
Pts: Nader 17; Rebs: Tatum 12; Asts: Allen, Nader 2	Pts: Exum 16; Rebs: Southerland 7 Asts: Exum 4

Jon M. Huntsman Center, Salt Lake City, Utah

=== Final results ===
#	Team	GP	W	L	QW
1	Utah Jazz	3	3	0	8.5
2	San Antonio Spurs	3	1	2	5.5
3	Boston Celtics	3	1	2	5
4	Philadelphia 76ers	3	1	2	5

=== Statistical leaders ===
Points

Player	Team	PPG
Bryn Forbes	San Antonio Spurs	21.3
Markelle Fultz	Philadelphia 76ers	20.0
Dante Exum	Utah Jazz	20.0
Jayson Tatum	Boston Celtics	18.7
Jaylen Brown	Boston Celtics	17.5

Rebounds

Player	Team	RPG
Jaylen Brown	Boston Celtics	10.5
Jayson Tatum	Boston Celtics	9.7
Cory Jefferson	San Antonio Spurs	7.3
Isaiah Miles	Philadelphia 76ers	7.0
Julian Wright	Utah Jazz	6.5

Assists

Player	Team	APG
Dante Exum	Utah Jazz	6.3
Larry Drew II	Philadelphia 76ers	5.0
Dejounte Murray	San Antonio Spurs	4.5
Timothé Luwawu-Cabarrot	Philadelphia 76ers	4.0
Donovan Mitchell	Utah Jazz	3.3

== Las Vegas NBA Summer League ==
The Las Vegas NBA Summer League is the official summer league of the NBA. It is the premier summer league of the three, with a total of 24 teams participating. A total of 67 games were played from July 7 to 17, 2017, at the Thomas & Mack Center and Cox Pavilion, both located in Paradise, Nevada (near Las Vegas). Teams will compete in three preliminary games beginning on July 7 before being seeded in a tournament that leads to the Championship Game on July 17. Each team will play at least five games in Las Vegas.

=== Teams ===
- Atlanta Hawks
- Boston Celtics
- Brooklyn Nets
- Chicago Bulls
- Cleveland Cavaliers
- Dallas Mavericks
- Denver Nuggets
- Golden State Warriors
- Houston Rockets
- Los Angeles Clippers
- Los Angeles Lakers
- Memphis Grizzlies
- Miami Heat
- Milwaukee Bucks
- Minnesota Timberwolves
- New Orleans Pelicans
- Philadelphia 76ers
- Phoenix Suns
- Portland Trail Blazers
- Sacramento Kings
- San Antonio Spurs
- Toronto Raptors
- Utah Jazz
- Washington Wizards

=== Las Vegas Schedule ===
All times are in Pacific Daylight Time (UTC-7)

==== Day 1 ====
NBA TV

July 7
3:00 pm

Boxscore

Toronto Raptors 96, New Orleans Pelicans 93
Scoring by quarter: 23–23, 27–34, 21–16, 25–20
Pts: Siakam 24; Rebs: Pöltl 10; Asts: VanVleet 9	Pts: Diallo 27; Rebs: Diallo 10; Asts: Cousins 5

Cox Pavilion, Paradise, Nevada

ESPN2

July 7
3:30 pm

Boxscore

Milwaukee Bucks 53, Cleveland Cavaliers 82
Scoring by quarter: 14–22, 10–21, 21–21, 8–18
Pts: Vaughn 12; Rebs: Maker, Wilson 5 Asts: Payton II 3	Pts: Tavares 12; Rebs: Gill 11; Asts: Williams 3

Thomas and Mack Center, Paradise, Nevada

NBA TV

July 7
5:00 pm

Boxscore

Brooklyn Nets 75, Atlanta Hawks 72
Scoring by quarter: 23–21, 19–10, 22–17, 11–24
Pts: Goodwin, Whitehead 14; Rebs: Goodwin, Hollis-Jefferson, LeVert 6 Asts: Dinwiddie 3	Pts: Bembry 22; Rebs: Collins 11; Asts: Bembry, Cotton 2

Cox Pavilion, Paradise, Nevada

ESPN

July 7
5:30 pm

Boxscore

Los Angeles Clippers 96, Los Angeles Lakers 93 (OT)
Scoring by quarter: 18–21, 23–28, 25–21, 21–17, Overtime: 9–6
Pts: Thornwell 26; Rebs: Johnson 7 Asts: Marshall 11	Pts: Ingram 26; Rebs: Bryant 5 Asts: Ball 5

Thomas and Mack Center, Paradise, Nevada

NBA TV

July 7
7:00 pm

Boxscore

Houston Rockets 102, Denver Nuggets 99
Scoring by quarter: 26–17, 26–25, 25–29, 25–28
Pts: Williams 22; Rebs: Johnson 8 Asts: Taylor 10	Pts: Beasley 29; Rebs: Hernangomez 8 Asts: Morris 3

Cox Pavilion, Paradise, Nevada

ESPN2

July 7
7:30 pm

Boxscore

Phoenix Suns 89, Sacramento Kings 85
Scoring by quarter: 22–22, 22–19, 22–24, 23–20
Pts: Chriss 19; Rebs: Chriss 9 Asts: James 7	Pts: Fox, Jackson 18; Rebs: Papagiannis 11; Asts: Fox 4

Thomas and Mack Center, Paradise, Nevada

==== Day 2 ====
ESPNU

July 8
1:00 pm

Boxscore

Washington Wizards 88, Memphis Grizzlies 91
Scoring by quarter: 14–23, 24–25, 22–25, 28–18
Pts: Cunningham 26; Rebs: Ochefu 10; Asts: Pangos 7	Pts: Selden 28; Rebs: Davis 14; Asts: Simmons 4

Cox Pavilion, Paradise, Nevada

NBA TV

July 8
1:30 pm

Boxscore

Dallas Mavericks 91, Chicago Bulls 75
Scoring by quarter: 19–21, 19–22, 28–17, 25–15
Pts: Ashley 21; Rebs: Finney-Smith, Smith Jr. 7 Asts: Smith Jr. 6	Pts: Markkanen 14; Rebs: Markkanen 8 Asts: Payne 4

Thomas and Mack Center, Paradise, Nevada

ESPNU

July 8
3:00 pm

Boxscore

Portland Trail Blazers 72, Utah Jazz 63
Scoring by quarter: 18–12, 12–20, 24–12, 18–19
Pts: Swanigan 16; Rebs: Swanigan 13; Asts: Connaughton 6	Pts: Mitchell 19; Rebs: Bolomboy 8 Asts: Wallace 3

Cox Pavilion, Paradise, Nevada

NBA TV

July 8
3:30 pm

Boxscore

Toronto Raptors 97, Minnesota Timberwolves 72
Scoring by quarter: 25–20, 18–16, 30–15, 24–21
Pts: Siakam 17; Rebs: Pöltl 10; Asts: VanVleet 5	Pts: Paige 18; Rebs: Costello, Putney 7 Asts: Costello 2

Thomas and Mack Center, Paradise, Nevada

ESPNU

July 8
5:00 pm

Boxscore

Miami Heat 75, San Antonio Spurs 74
Scoring by quarter: 12–20, 24–25, 23–18, 16–11
Pts: Adebayo 18; Rebs: Adebayo 10; Asts: Perrantes 5	Pts: Forbes 18; Rebs: Murray 9 Asts: Forbes, Murray 4

Cox Pavilion, Paradise, Nevada

ESPN

July 8
5:30 pm

Boxscore

Boston Celtics 86, Los Angeles Lakers 81
Scoring by quarter: 14–20, 20–18, 29–19, 23–24
Pts: Tatum 27; Rebs: Tatum 11; Asts: Jackson 4	Pts: Kuzma 31; Rebs: Ball 11; Asts: Ball 11

Thomas and Mack Center, Paradise, Nevada

ESPNU

July 8
7:00 pm

Boxscore

Houston Rockets 90, Cleveland Cavaliers 95 (OT)
Scoring by quarter: 22–28, 18–16, 22–21, 26–23, Overtime: 2–7
Pts: Williams 21; Rebs: Johnson, Onuaku 8 Asts: Taylor 6	Pts: Felder 16; Rebs: Gill 10; Asts: Felder 6

Cox Pavilion, Paradise, Nevada

ESPN2

July 8
7:30 pm

Boxscore

Philadelphia 76ers 95, Golden State Warriors 93
Scoring by quarter: 27–27, 21–24, 24–27, 23–15
Pts: Korkmaz 15; Rebs: Bolden 10; Asts: Drew II 6	Pts: McCaw 25; Rebs: Looney 7 Asts: Hamilton 8

Thomas and Mack Center, Paradise, Nevada

==== Day 3 ====
NBA TV

July 9
4:00 pm

Boxscore

Atlanta Hawks 84, New Orleans Pelicans 82
Scoring by quarter: 26–22, 15–22, 24–20, 19–18
Pts: Collins 22; Rebs: Collins 10; Asts: Bembry 6	Pts: Cook 25; Rebs: Diallo 10; Asts: Cook 5

Cox Pavilion, Paradise, Nevada

ESPN

July 9
4:30 pm

Boxscore

Phoenix Suns 77, Dallas Mavericks 88
Scoring by quarter: 18–30, 18–20, 19–19, 22–19
Pts: James 19; Rebs: Chriss 10; Asts: five players 2	Pts: Smith Jr. 25; Rebs: Finney-Smith 10; Asts: Smith Jr. 4

Thomas and Mack Center, Paradise, Nevada

NBA TV

July 9
6:00 pm

Boxscore

Milwaukee Bucks 88, Brooklyn Nets 83
Scoring by quarter: 18–14, 17–21, 30–27, 23–21
Pts: Vaughn 31; Rebs: Wilson, Maker 8 Asts: Trice Jr. 3	Pts: LeVert 18; Rebs: Hollis-Jefferson 12; Asts: LeVert, Whitehead 3

Cox Pavilion, Paradise, Nevada

ESPN2

July 9
6:30 pm

Boxscore

Minnesota Timberwolves 90, Denver Nuggets 71
Scoring by quarter: 22–17, 28–19, 23–19, 17–16
Pts: Ellis 19; Rebs: Costello 15; Asts: Gibbs, Paige 6	Pts: Beasley 20; Rebs: Hernangómez 7 Asts: Morris 3

Thomas and Mack Center, Paradise, Nevada

NBA TV

July 9
8:00 pm

Boxscore

Utah Jazz 67, Los Angeles Clippers 86
Scoring by quarter: 18–9, 10–31, 19–22, 20–24
Pts: Bradley 16; Rebs: Bradley 9 Asts: Williams-Goss 8	Pts: Wilson 19; Rebs: Brown 7 Asts: Marshall 5

Cox Pavilion, Paradise, Nevada

ESPN2

July 9
8:30 pm

Boxscore

Portland Trail Blazers 64, Boston Celtics 70
Scoring by quarter: 15–18, 9–20, 20–16, 20–16
Pts: Swanigan 12; Rebs: Swanigan 7 Asts: Connaughton 4	Pts: Brown 13; Rebs: Žižić 11; Asts: Jackson 4

Thomas and Mack Center, Paradise, Nevada

NBA TV

July 9
10:00 pm

Boxscore

Memphis Grizzlies 81, Sacramento Kings 75
Scoring by quarter: 17–15, 24–17, 19–21, 21–22
Pts: Selden, Martin 21; Rebs: Baldwin IV, Martin 10; Asts: Selden, Baldwin IV 4	Pts: Fox 17; Rebs: Labissière 8 Asts: Fox 4

Cox Pavilion, Paradise, Nevada

ESPN2

July 9
10:30 pm

Boxscore

Philadelphia 76ers 95, San Antonio Spurs 101
Scoring by quarter: 23–25, 23–28, 21–25, 28–23
Pts: Harrison 14; Rebs: Poythress 6 Asts: Drew II 5	Pts: Forbes 35; Rebs: Blossomgame, Whittington 6 Asts: Hanlan 5

Thomas and Mack Center, Paradise, Nevada

==== Day 4 ====
ESPNU

July 10
4:00 pm

Boxscore

Atlanta Hawks 75, Chicago Bulls 55
Scoring by quarter: 17–14, 28–12, 14–18, 16–11
Pts: Bembry 17; Rebs: Collins 11; Asts: Bembry 4	Pts: Payne 12; Rebs: Markkanen, Valentine 9 Asts: Valentine 3

Cox Pavilion, Paradise, Nevada

NBA TV

July 10
4:30 pm

Boxscore

Miami Heat 91, Washington Wizards 87
Scoring by quarter: 16–20, 28–24, 23–20, 24–23
Pts: Williams 17; Rebs: Adebayo 7 Asts: Keene, Odum 5	Pts: McClellan 18; Rebs: McCullough 11; Asts: Keene, Pangos 3

Thomas and Mack Center, Paradise, Nevada

ESPNU

July 10
6:00 pm

Boxscore

Brooklyn Nets 95, New Orleans Pelicans 66
Scoring by quarter: 24–12, 27–15, 24–21, 20–18
Pts: Goodwin 18; Rebs: Poirier 11; Asts: Goodwin 8	Pts: Cook 20; Rebs: Diallo 8 Asts: Cousins 3

Cox Pavilion, Paradise, Nevada

NBA TV

July 10
6:30 pm

Boxscore

Houston Rockets 99, Phoenix Suns 94
Scoring by quarter: 15–26, 25–27, 35–23, 24–18
Pts: Williams 27; Rebs: Onuaku 10; Asts: Taylor 8	Pts: Chriss 26; Rebs: Chriss, Wood 7 Asts: James

Thomas and Mack Center, Paradise, Nevada

ESPNU

July 10
8:00 pm

Boxscore

Denver Nuggets 81, Toronto Raptors 82
Scoring by quarter: 18–20, 19–26, 28–17, 16–19
Pts: Beasley 19; Rebs: Hernangómez 7 Asts: Hernangómez, Morris 5	Pts: Pöltl, VanVleet 17; Rebs: McKinnie 11; Asts: Siakam 4

Cox Pavilion, Paradise, Nevada

NBA TV

July 10
8:30 pm

Boxscore

Golden State Warriors 74, Cleveland Cavaliers 91
Scoring by quarter: 19–30, 12–20, 19–24, 24–17
Pts: Hamilton 11; Rebs: Jones, Looney 9 Asts: Bell 3	Pts: Paul 21; Rebs: Thomas 10; Asts: Felder, Gill, Paul 2

Thomas and Mack Center, Paradise, Nevada

ESPN2

July 10
10:00 pm

Boxscore

Los Angeles Clippers 100, Milwaukee Bucks 93
Scoring by quarter: 19–21, 29–31, 23–23, 29–18
Pts: Harrell 21; Rebs: Wilson 8 Asts: Evans, Wilson 8	Pts: Vaughn 21; Rebs: Wilson 8 Asts: Wilson 4

Cox Pavilion, Paradise, Nevada

NBA TV

July 10
10:30 pm

Boxscore

Los Angeles Lakers 95, Sacramento Kings 92
Scoring by quarter: 21–22, 37–18, 15–24, 22–28
Pts: Blue 21; Rebs: Nwaba 9 Asts: Caruso 9	Pts: Mason 24; Rebs: Montero 7 Asts: Mason 6

Thomas and Mack Center, Paradise, Nevada

==== Day 5 ====
ESPNU

July 11
4:00 pm

Boxscore

San Antonio Spurs 99, Portland Trail Blazers 85
Scoring by quarter: 25–19, 29–22, 23–18, 22–26
Pts: Forbes 35; Rebs: Whittington 7 Asts: Forbes 4	Pts: Swanigan 19; Rebs: Swanigan 13; Asts: Gutiérrez 5

Cox Pavilion, Paradise, Nevada

NBA TV

July 11
4:30 pm

Boxscore

Utah Jazz 81, Memphis Grizzlies 84 (OT)
Scoring by quarter: 20–14, 19–29, 15–19, 24–16, Overtime: 3–6
Pts: Mitchell 37; Rebs: Griffin 11; Asts: Griffin 3	Pts: Brooks 24; Rebs: Martin 8 Asts: Baldwin IV 5

Thomas and Mack Center, Paradise, Nevada

ESPNU

July 11
6:00 pm

Boxscore

Chicago Bulls 82, Washington Wizards 73
Scoring by quarter: 33–15, 19–21, 10–17, 20–20
Pts: Blakeney 23; Rebs: Markkanen 10; Asts: Valentine 4	Pts: McClellan 20; Rebs: Ochefu 10; Asts: Wayns 3

Cox Pavilion, Paradise, Nevada

NBA TV

July 11
6:30 pm

Boxscore

Philadelphia 76ers 83, Boston Celtics 88
Scoring by quarter: 24–31, 17–17, 25–11, 17–29
Pts: Luwawu-Cabarrot 16; Rebs: Bolden 8 Asts: Drew II 5	Pts: Bird, Tatum 15; Rebs: Žižić 13; Asts: Jackson 4

Thomas and Mack Center, Paradise, Nevada

ESPNU

July 11
8:00 pm

Boxscore

Miami Heat 73, Dallas Mavericks 78
Scoring by quarter: 19–18, 12–13, 18–23, 24–24
Pts: Clavell 18; Rebs: White 13; Asts: Robinson 4	Pts: Ferrell 23; Rebs: Ashley, Motley 6 Asts: Smith Jr. 5

Cox Pavilion, Paradise, Nevada

NBA TV

July 11
8:30 pm

Boxscore

Golden State Warriors 76, Minnesota Timberwolves 78 (2OT)
Scoring by quarter: 9–13, 20–24, 29–15, 15–21, Overtime: 3–3, 0–2
Pts: McCaw 20; Rebs: Bell 11; Asts: Bell 5	Pts: Costello, Williams 14; Rebs: Costello 15; Asts: Paige 8

Thomas and Mack Center, Paradise, Nevada

=== Championship ===
The championship is determined by a single-elimination tournament; the top 8 teams receive a first-round bye.

Seeding criteria

Teams are seeded first by overall record, then by a tiebreaker system

1. Head-to-head result (applicable only to ties between two teams, not to multiple-team ties)
2. Quarter point system (1 point for win, .5 for tie, 0 for loss, 0 for overtime periods)
3. Point differential
4. Coin flip

First-round losers will play consolation games to determine 17th through 24th places based on the tiebreaker system stated above. Second-round losers will play consolation games to determine ninth through 16th places.

==== Standings/seedings ====
#	Team	GP	W	L	PCT	QP	PD
1	Toronto Raptors	3	3	0	1.000	9.5	
2	Cleveland Cavaliers	3	3	0	1.000	7.5	
3	Dallas Mavericks	3	3	0	1.000	7	+32
4	Memphis Grizzlies	3	3	0	1.000	7	+12
5	Los Angeles Clippers	3	3	0	1.000	6.5	+29
6	Boston Celtics	3	3	0	1.000	6.5	+16
7	Brooklyn Nets	3	2	1	.667	8	+27
8	San Antonio Spurs	3	2	1	.667	8	+19
9	Atlanta Hawks	3	2	1	.667	7	+19
10	Houston Rockets	3	2	1	.667	7	+3
11	Minnesota Timberwolves	3	2	1	.667	7	-4
12	Miami Heat	3	2	1	.667	6.5	
13	Phoenix Suns	3	1	2	.333	6	-12
14	Milwaukee Bucks	3	1	2	.333	6	-31
15	Los Angeles Lakers	3	1	2	.333	5	-5
16	Portland Trail Blazers	3	1	2	.333	5	-11
17	Chicago Bulls	3	1	2	.333	4.5	
18	Philadelphia 76ers	3	1	2	.333	4	
19	Sacramento Kings	3	0	3	.000	6.5	
20	Utah Jazz	3	0	3	.000	5	
21	Washington Wizards	3	0	3	.000	4.5	
22	Golden State Warriors	3	0	3	.000	3.5	
23	Denver Nuggets	3	0	3	.000	3	
24	New Orleans Pelicans	3	0	3	.000	2.5	

==== Bracket ====
First round (July 12)
16	Portland Trail Blazers	88
17	Chicago Bulls	77
9	Atlanta Hawks	95
24	New Orleans Pelicans	105
12	Miami Heat	89
21	Washington Wizards	88
13	Phoenix Suns	97
20	Utah Jazz	81
14	Milwaukee Bucks	65
19	Sacramento Kings	69
11	Minnesota Timberwolves	69
22	Golden State Warriors	77
10	Houston Rockets	81
23	Denver Nuggets	87
15	Los Angeles Lakers	103
18	Philadelphia 76ers	102

Second round (July 13)
1	Toronto Raptors	85
16	Portland Trail Blazers	91
24	New Orleans Pelicans	81
8	San Antonio Spurs	86
5	Los Angeles Clippers	84
12	Miami Heat	91
13	Phoenix Suns	98
4	Memphis Grizzlies	102
3	Dallas Mavericks	83
19	Sacramento Kings	76
22	Golden State Warriors	69
6	Boston Celtics	93
7	Brooklyn Nets	85
23	Denver Nuggets	74
15	Los Angeles Lakers	94
2	Cleveland Cavaliers	83

Quarterfinals (July 15)
16	Portland Trail Blazers	94
8	San Antonio Spurs	87
12	Miami Heat	95
4	Memphis Grizzlies (2OT)	98
3	Dallas Mavericks	91
6	Boston Celtics	74
7	Brooklyn Nets	106
15	Los Angeles Lakers	115

Semifinals (July 16)
16	Portland Trail Blazers	87
4	Memphis Grizzlies	82
3	Dallas Mavericks	98
15	Los Angeles Lakers	108

Final (July 17)
16	Portland Trail Blazers	98
15	Los Angeles Lakers	110

==== Tournament schedule ====
All times are in Eastern Daylight Time (UTC−4)

===== First round =====
NBA TV

July 12
4:00 pm

Boxscore

#24 New Orleans Pelicans 105, #9 Atlanta Hawks 95
Scoring by quarter: 24–26, 33–17, 20–26, 28–26
Pts: Cook 26; Rebs: Diallo 8 Asts: Cook 7	Pts: Collins 25; Rebs: Collins 9 Asts: Magette 6

Cox Pavilion, Paradise, Nevada

ESPNU

July 12
4:30 pm

Boxscore

#23 Denver Nuggets 87, #10 Houston Rockets 81
Scoring by quarter: 20–12, 21–24, 22–21, 24–24
Pts: Craig 27; Rebs: Craig 11; Asts: Morris 4	Pts: Johnson, Williams 20; Rebs: Onuaku 7 Asts: Taylor 7

Thomas & Mack Center, Paradise, Nevada

NBA TV

July 12
6:00 pm

Boxscore

#21 Washington Wizards 88, #12 Miami Heat 89
Scoring by quarter: 26–22, 23–19, 14–25, 25–23
Pts: Keene 18; Rebs: Diogu, Ochefu 5 Asts: Wayns 3	Pts: Robinson 19; Rebs: Auguste 9 Asts: Odum 4

Cox Pavilion, Paradise, Nevada

ESPN2

July 12
6:30 pm

Boxscore

#22 Golden State Warriors 77, #11 Minnesota Timberwolves 69
Scoring by quarter: 18–17, 20–18, 16–16, 23–18
Pts: McCaw 26; Rebs: Bell 16; Asts: McCaw 5	Pts: Williams 19; Rebs: Ellis 8 Asts: Paige 6

Thomas & Mack Center, Paradise, Nevada

NBA TV

July 12
8:00 pm

Boxscore

#20 Utah Jazz 81, #13 Phoenix Suns 97
Scoring by quarter: 13–15, 29–25, 22–29, 17–28
Pts: Griffin 18; Rebs: Griffin 10; Asts: Williams-Goss 4	Pts: Jackson 21; Rebs: Jackson 15; Asts: James 7

Cox Pavilion, Paradise, Nevada

ESPN2

July 12
8:30 pm

Boxscore

#19 Sacramento Kings 69, #14 Milwaukee Bucks 65
Scoring by quarter: 15–12, 13–12, 20–25, 21–16
Pts: Labissière 19; Rebs: Papagiannis 13; Asts: Jackson 5	Pts: Brown, Vaughn 12; Rebs: Upshaw Jr. 7 Asts: Brown 4

Thomas & Mack Center, Paradise, Nevada

NBA TV

July 12
10:00 pm

Boxscore

#17 Chicago Bulls 77, #16 Portland Trail Blazers 88
Scoring by quarter: 19–12, 22–23, 20–26, 16–27
Pts: Blakeney 27; Rebs: Blakeney 11; Asts: Valentine 4	Pts: Layman 22; Rebs: Stokes 17; Asts: Layman 3

Cox Pavilion, Paradise, Nevada

ESPN2

July 12
10:30 pm

Boxscore

#18 Philadelphia 76ers 102, #15 Los Angeles Lakers 103
Scoring by quarter: 26–24, 31–25, 26–26, 19–28
Pts: Korkmaz 19; Rebs: Bolden 7 Asts: Drew II 8	Pts: Ball 36; Rebs: Kuzma 12; Asts: Ball 11

Thomas & Mack Center, Paradise, Nevada

===== Second round =====
NBA TV

July 13
4:00 pm

Boxscore

#24 New Orleans Pelicans 81, #8 San Antonio Spurs 86
Scoring by quarter: 20–25, 20–15, 25–15, 16–31
Pts: Cook 16; Rebs: Diallo 13; Asts: Cook 7	Pts: Forbes 29; Rebs: Hanlan 10; Asts: Hanlan 6

Cox Pavilion, Paradise, Nevada

ESPNU

July 13
4:30 pm

Boxscore

#23 Denver Nuggets 74, #7 Brooklyn Nets 85
Scoring by quarter: 15–22, 22–23, 13–24, 24–16
Pts: Beasley 20; Rebs: Beasley 7 Asts: Morris 5	Pts: Whitehead 14; Rebs: Wiley 9 Asts: Whitehead 4

Thomas & Mack Center, Paradise, Nevada

NBA TV

July 13
6:00 pm

Boxscore

#22 Golden State Warriors 69, #6 Boston Celtics 93
Scoring by quarter: 5–20, 25–28, 17–27, 22–18
Pts: McCaw 20; Rebs: Bell 6 Asts: McCaw 2	Pts: Allen 18; Rebs: Zizic 10; Asts: Jackson 4

Cox Pavilion, Paradise, Nevada

ESPN2

July 13
6:30 pm

Boxscore

#12 Miami Heat 91, #5 Los Angeles Clippers 84
Scoring by quarter: 14–24, 26–19, 26–20, 25–21
Pts: White 23; Rebs: Hammons 9 Asts: Robinson 6	Pts: Johnson 13; Rebs: Thompson 7 Asts: Marshall 4

Thomas & Mack Center, Paradise, Nevada

NBA TV

July 13
8:00 pm

Boxscore

#13 Phoenix Suns 98, #4 Memphis Grizzlies 102
Scoring by quarter: 19–16, 27–37, 27–23, 25–26
Pts: James 32; Rebs: Jackson 8 Asts: Bender, James 5	Pts: Selden 33; Rebs: Baldwin IV, Hunter 7 Asts: Brooks 3

Cox Pavilion, Paradise, Nevada

ESPN2

July 13
8:30 pm

Boxscore

#19 Sacramento Kings 76, #3 Dallas Mavericks 83
Scoring by quarter: 15–23, 16–18, 23–23, 22–19
Pts: Jackson 25; Rebs: Montero 9 Asts: Jackson 4	Pts: Smith Jr. 25; Rebs: Finney-Smith, Smith Jr. 7 Asts: five players 2

Thomas & Mack Center, Paradise, Nevada

NBA TV

July 13
10:00 pm

Boxscore

#16 Portland Trail Blazers 91, #1 Toronto Raptors 85
Scoring by quarter: 23–19, 21–25, 23–24, 24–17
Pts: Johnson 17; Rebs: Swanigan 11; Asts: Gutiérrez 7	Pts: VanVleet 31; Rebs: McKinnie 9 Asts: Caupain, VanVleet 3

Cox Pavilion, Paradise, Nevada

ESPN2

July 13
10:30 pm

Boxscore

#15 Los Angeles Lakers 94, #2 Cleveland Cavaliers 83
Scoring by quarter: 29–19, 20–27, 23–22, 22–15
Pts: Kuzma 20; Rebs: Ball, Zubac 10; Asts: Ball 12	Pts: Felder 25; Rebs: Gill 10; Asts: Felder 4

Thomas & Mack Center, Paradise, Nevada

===== Consolation round =====
NBA TV

July 14
4:00 pm

Boxscore

#10 Houston Rockets 86, #9 Atlanta Hawks 92
Scoring by quarter: 16–14, 24–24, 24–20, 22–34
Pts: Peak 19; Rebs: Zhou 8 Asts: Taylor 6	Pts: Lockett 17; Rebs: Cordinier 6 Asts: Cordinier 7

Cox Pavilion, Paradise, Nevada

ESPN2

July 14
4:30 pm

Boxscore

#21 Washington Wizards 73, #11 Minnesota Timberwolves 80
Scoring by quarter: 21–17, 30–22, 11–20, 11–21
Pts: House 13; Rebs: Robinson 10; Asts: Diogu 2	Pts: Costello 14; Rebs: Costello 11; Asts: Gibbs 7

Thomas & Mack Center, Paradise, Nevada

NBA TV

July 14
6:00 pm

Boxscore

#20 Utah Jazz 97, #14 Milwaukee Bucks 76
Scoring by quarter: 27–17, 29–22, 20–19, 21–18
Pts: Bradley 19; Rebs: Bradley 8 Asts: Williams-Goss, Wallace 5	Pts: Payton II, Zimmerman 12; Rebs: Zimmerman 6 Asts: Trice Jr. 5

Cox Pavilion, Paradise, Nevada

ESPN2

July 14
6:30 pm

Boxscore

#22 Golden State Warriors 109, #5 Los Angeles Clippers 100
Scoring by quarter: 21–19, 35–35, 24–20, 29–26
Pts: Ennis 35; Rebs: Looney 11; Asts: Allen 5	Pts: Johnson 18; Rebs: Hicks 6 Asts: Marshall 11

Thomas & Mack Center, Paradise, Nevada

NBA TV

July 14
8:00 pm

Boxscore

#24 New Orleans Pelicans 91, #23 Denver Nuggets 96
Scoring by quarter: 22–23, 22–23, 23–27, 24–23
Pts: Jok 22; Rebs: Jones 12; Asts: Cousins 7	Pts: Morris 17; Rebs: Cornelie 11; Asts: Morris 6

Cox Pavilion, Paradise, Nevada

ESPN2

July 14
8:30 pm

Boxscore

#18 Philadelphia 76ers 82, #17 Chicago Bulls 99
Scoring by quarter: 20–20, 18–26, 18–23, 26–30
Pts: Korkmaz 22; Rebs: Korkmaz 8 Asts: Briscoe 4	Pts: Heslip 28; Rebs: Walker 11; Asts: Arcidiacono 7

Thomas & Mack Center, Paradise, Nevada

NBA TV

July 14
10:00 pm

Boxscore

#19 Sacramento Kings 93, #13 Phoenix Suns 87
Scoring by quarter: 13–22, 20–17, 28–27, 32–21
Pts: Jackson 29; Rebs: Cooley 11; Asts: Mitrou-Long 5	Pts: James 25; Rebs: Putney 7 Asts: James 4

Cox Pavilion, Paradise, Nevada

ESPN2

July 14
10:30 pm

Boxscore

#2 Cleveland Cavaliers 78, #1 Toronto Raptors 75 (OT)
Scoring by quarter: 22–17, 16–23, 15–17, 20–16, Overtime: 5–2
Pts: Williams 21; Rebs: Jones, Tavares 11; Asts: Pointer 6	Pts: Meeks 18; Rebs: Meeks 9 Asts: Loyd, Meeks 3

Thomas & Mack Center, Paradise, Nevada

===== Quarterfinals =====
ESPN2

July 15
4:00 pm

Boxscore

#16 Portland Trail Blazers 94, #8 San Antonio Spurs 87
Scoring by quarter: 22–24, 25–16, 18–25, 29–22
Pts: Layman 23; Rebs: Swanigan 9 Asts: Hunter 5	Pts: White 20; Rebs: Blossomgame 9 Asts: Hanlan 4

Thomas & Mack Center, Paradise, Nevada

ESPN2

July 15
6:00 pm

Boxscore

#12 Miami Heat 95, #4 Memphis Grizzlies 98 (2OT)
Scoring by quarter: 16–23, 23–18, 21–22, 30–27, Overtime: 2–2, 3–6
Pts: Clavell 20; Rebs: Mika 8 Asts: Clavell, Odum 4	Pts: Selden 24; Rebs: Hunter 12; Asts: Selden 4

Thomas & Mack Center, Paradise, Nevada

ESPN2

July 15
8:00 pm

Boxscore

#6 Boston Celtics 74, #3 Dallas Mavericks 91
Scoring by quarter: 15–20, 17–26, 24–30, 18–15
Pts: Allen 12; Rebs: Petteway, Wood 6 Asts: Allen 4	Pts: Ferrell 20; Rebs: Ashley, Finney-Smith 5 Asts: Ferrell 5

Thomas & Mack Center, Paradise, Nevada

ESPN2

July 15
10:00 pm

Boxscore

#15 Los Angeles Lakers 115, #7 Brooklyn Nets 106
Scoring by quarter: 30–37, 25–26, 28–18, 32–25
Pts: Blue 27; Rebs: Ball 9 Asts: Ball 7	Pts: LeVert 23; Rebs: Hollis-Jefferson 13; Asts: Dinwiddie 4

Thomas & Mack Center, Paradise, Nevada

===== Semifinals =====
ESPN2

July 16
6:00 pm

Boxscore

#16 Portland Trail Blazers 87, #4 Memphis Grizzlies 82
Scoring by quarter: 15–23, 23–22, 23–18, 26–19
Pts: Stokes 22; Rebs: Stokes 15; Asts: Gutiérrez 8	Pts: Brooks 16; Rebs: Davis 7 Asts: Morgan, Selden 4

Thomas & Mack Center, Paradise, Nevada

ESPN2

July 16
8:00 pm

Boxscore

#15 Los Angeles Lakers 108, #3 Dallas Mavericks 98
Scoring by quarter: 34–24, 28–16, 22–27, 24–31
Pts: Kuzma 24; Rebs: Zubac 7 Asts: Ball 10	Pts: Smith Jr. 21; Rebs: Motley 9 Asts: Smith Jr. 6

Thomas & Mack Center, Paradise, Nevada

===== Final =====
ESPN

July 17
7:00 pm

Boxscore

#16 Portland Trail Blazers 98, #15 Los Angeles Lakers 110
Scoring by quarter: 30–27, 29–31, 20–26, 19–26
Pts: Swanigan 25; Rebs: Swanigan 12; Asts: Swanigan 7	Pts: Kuzma 30; Rebs: Kuzma 10; Asts: Caruso 9

Thomas & Mack Center, Paradise, Nevada

=== Final standings ===
#	Team	GP	W	L	PCT	QP	Explanation
1	Los Angeles Lakers	8	6	2	.750	16.5	Won Championship Game
2	Portland Trail Blazers	8	5	3	.625	16	Lost Championship Game
3	Dallas Mavericks	6	5	1	.833	14.5	Lost in semifinals
4	Memphis Grizzlies	6	5	1	.833	12	Lost in semifinals
5	Boston Celtics	5	4	1	.800	10.5	Lost in quarterfinals
6	Miami Heat	6	4	2	.667	12.5	Lost in quarterfinals
7	Brooklyn Nets	5	3	2	.600	13	Lost in quarterfinals
8	San Antonio Spurs	5	3	2	.600	12	Lost in quarterfinals
9	Cleveland Cavaliers	5	4	1	.800	10.5	Lost in Second round
10	Toronto Raptors	5	3	2	.600	13.5	Lost in Second round
11	Los Angeles Clippers	5	3	2	.600	8	Lost in Second round
12	Sacramento Kings	6	2	4	.333	14	Lost in Second round
13	Golden State Warriors	6	2	4	.333	12.5	Lost in Second round
14	Phoenix Suns	6	2	4	.333	12	Lost in Second round
15	Denver Nuggets	6	2	4	.333	9.5	Lost in Second round
16	New Orleans Pelicans	6	1	5	.167	7.5	Lost in Second round
17	Atlanta Hawks	5	3	2	.600	10.5	Lost in First Round
18	Minnesota Timberwolves	5	3	2	.600	9.5	Lost in First Round
19	Houston Rockets	5	2	3	.400	11	Lost in First Round
20	Chicago Bulls	5	2	3	.400	9	Lost in First Round
21	Utah Jazz	5	1	4	.200	10	Lost in First Round
22	Philadelphia 76ers	5	1	4	.200	7	Lost in First Round
23	Milwaukee Bucks	5	1	4	.200	7	Lost in First Round
24	Washington Wizards	5	0	5	.000	9.5	Lost in First Round

=== Statistical leaders ===
Points

Player	Team	PPG
Donovan Mitchell	Utah Jazz	28.0
Brandon Ingram	Los Angeles Lakers	26.0
Bryn Forbes	San Antonio Spurs	26.0
Wayne Selden Jr.	Memphis Grizzlies	22.7
Troy Williams	Houston Rockets	22.0

Rebounds

Player	Team	RPG
Matt Costello	Minnesota Timberwolves	12.0
Caleb Swanigan	Portland Trail Blazers	10.6
Cheick Diallo	New Orleans Pelicans	9.8
Rondae Hollis-Jefferson	Brooklyn Nets	9.4
John Collins	Atlanta Hawks	9.2

Assists

Player	Team	APG
Lonzo Ball	Los Angeles Lakers	9.3
Kendall Marshall	Los Angeles Clippers	7.8
Isaiah Taylor	Houston Rockets	7.4
Larry Drew II	Philadelphia 76ers	6.0
London Perrantes	Miami Heat	5.0

=== Honors ===
The All-Summer League First and Second Teams were selected by a panel of media members in attendance at the Las Vegas NBA Summer League.

All-NBA Summer League First Team

- Lonzo Ball, Los Angeles Lakers (2017 Tournament MVP)
- John Collins, Atlanta Hawks
- Josh Jackson, Phoenix Suns
- Dennis Smith Jr., Dallas Mavericks
- Caleb Swanigan, Portland Trail Blazers

All-NBA Summer League Second Team

- Cheick Diallo, New Orleans Pelicans
- Bryn Forbes, San Antonio Spurs
- Kyle Kuzma, Los Angeles Lakers
- Wayne Selden Jr., Memphis Grizzlies
- Jayson Tatum, Boston Celtics

Championship Game MVP: Kyle Kuzma, Los Angeles Lakers
