= Maccabi Rishon LeZion (basketball) =

- Leagues: Israeli Basketball Premier League
- Founded: 1976; 50 years ago
- Arena: Beit Maccabi
- Capacity: 2,500
- Location: Rishon LeZion, Israel
- Team colors: Orange and White
- CEO: Gilad Ziv
- President: Erez Ben Haim
- Team manager: Ziv Cohen
- Head coach: Guy Kaplan
- Championships: 1 Israeli Championship; 1 Israeli League Cup
- Website: maccabirishon.co.il
Home	Away

Maccabi Rishon LeZion (Hebrew: מכבי ראשון לציון) is a basketball club based in Rishon LeZion, Israel. The team plays in the Israeli Basketball Premier League, the top tier of Israeli basketball. The greatest achievement of the team was winning the Israeli championship in 2016. Rishon LeZion is one of the more popular basketball clubs in Israel, and has played in the top division since 1989. Some notable players have included Miki Berkovich, Doron Jamchi, Guy Goodes, Motti Aroesti, Kevin Magee, Moran Roth, and Hen Lippin.

== History ==
=== Early years ===
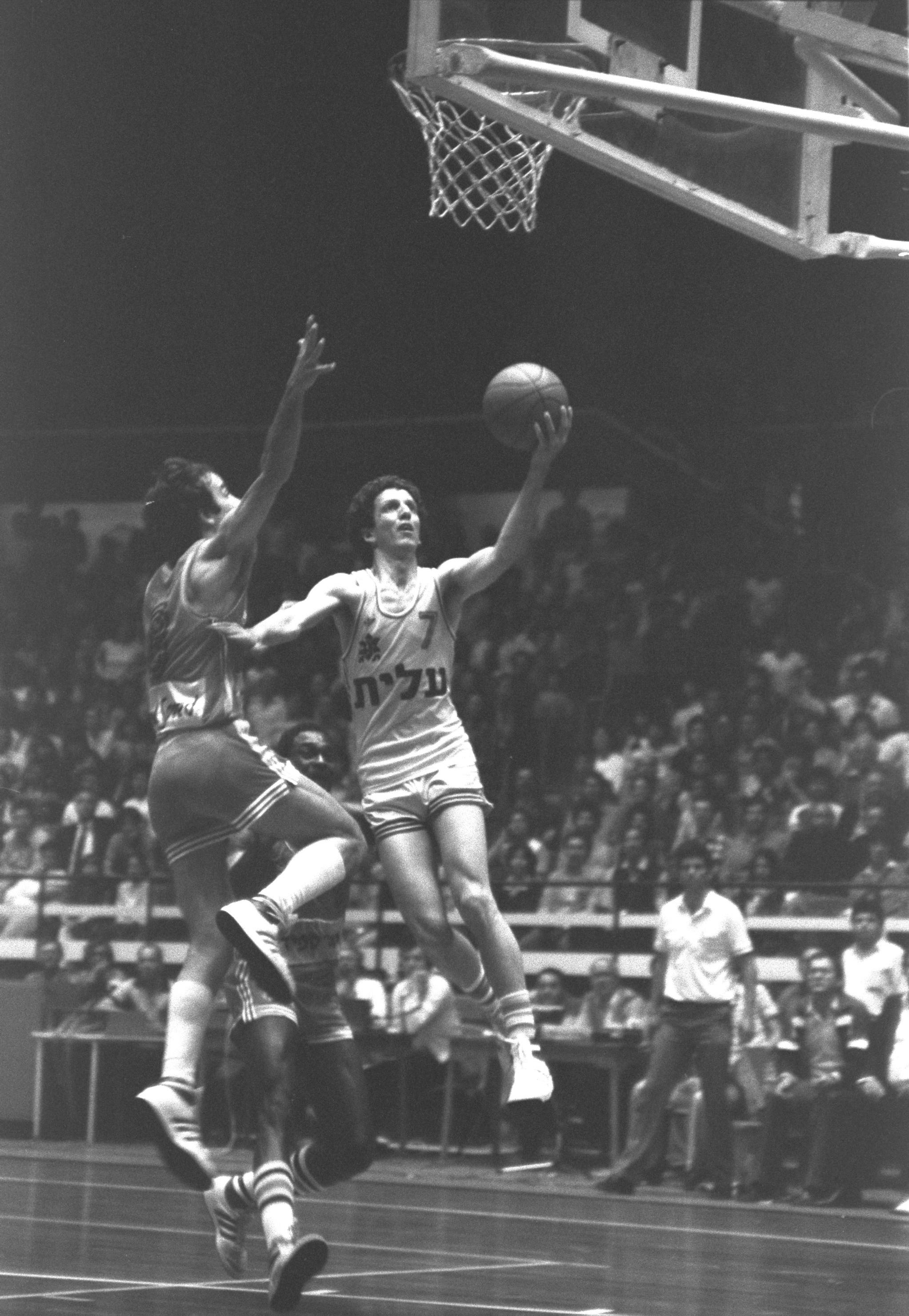
Motti Aroesti (right), 1983.

Maccabi Rishon LeZion was founded in 1976 by 28-year-old Itzhak Perry, and reached the top division Israeli Basketball Premier League, where they have remained since the 1988–89 season. At the start of their first season in the top division, Israeli star Miki Berkovich joined Richard Rellford, and they led the team. Their coach was Moshe Vainkretz, and they finished the season in 6th place. In the following season, Vainkretz was replaced by Tal Tzuker, and the team finished in 9th place.

=== 1990s ===
In 1990–91, Vainkretz returned to Maccabi Rishon LeZion. With some high-quality players such as Miki Berkovich, Gene Banks, Andre Spencer, and Motti Aroesti, the team finished the regular season in 2nd place in the league. In the semi-finals of the playoffs, Maccabi Rishon LeZion beat Hapoel Tel Aviv in a 3–0 sweep, and reached their first-ever final series. In the final, they lost in four games (3–1) to Maccabi Tel Aviv. One season later, in 1991–92, most of the key players stayed and the team ended the regular season again in 2nd place. This time, they lost in the semi-finals series to Hapoel Tel Aviv. However, Maccabi Rishon LeZion reached the final of the Israel State Cup, but lost 76:84 to Hapoel Galil Elyon. They also participated in the EuroLeague, but lost in the second qualifying round to Dutch champions Den Helder, and dropped to the European Cup, where they were eliminated in the group stage with a record of 3 wins and 7 losses. At the end of the season, some key players such as Banks, Spencer, and Chaim Zlotikman left the team, and as a result the team ended in 7th place during its 1992–93 campaign, and participated in the bottom playoffs.

The years passed and Pini Gershon returned for a second term with Maccabi Rishon LeZion in the 1997–98 season. Doron Jamchi led the team in points. Despite high expectations from Gershon, the team ended the regular season in 6th place. It lost to Hapoel Eilat in the quarterfinals. In the Korac Cup, the team lost in the third round to Polish side Stal Bobrek Bytom. In the following season, Vainkretz returned for a third term with the club and it finished the season in 9th place, and in the third round of the Korac Cup.

=== 2000s ===
The logo that the team used until 2017

After the team lost the first five games of 1999–00 season, Vainkretz resigned and was replaced by Hanan Keren. The club suffered from economic problems and injuries and finished the season in 10th place. They were not relegated, only because of league expansion.

In 2004–05, Guy Goodes was appointed head coach. The team lost to Maccabi Tel Aviv both in the league quarterfinals and in the semi-finals of the State Cup. With Goodes as head coach, the team "recovered" from the difficult years before. Omar Sneed, John Gilchrist, and Ryan Sidney joined as foreign players, the Israelis Or Eitan and Moran Roth joined as well, and they all led Maccabi Rishon LeZion to success in 2005–06 season. Rishon Lezion finished the regular season in 3rd place. They lost in the final four to Hapoel Jerusalem on a last-second shot by Horace Jenkins. However, they beat Ironi Nahariya in the 3rd place game. Eitan and Sneed were named to the Israeli All-League First Team, and Guy Goodes was named Head Coach of the Year.

=== 2010s ===
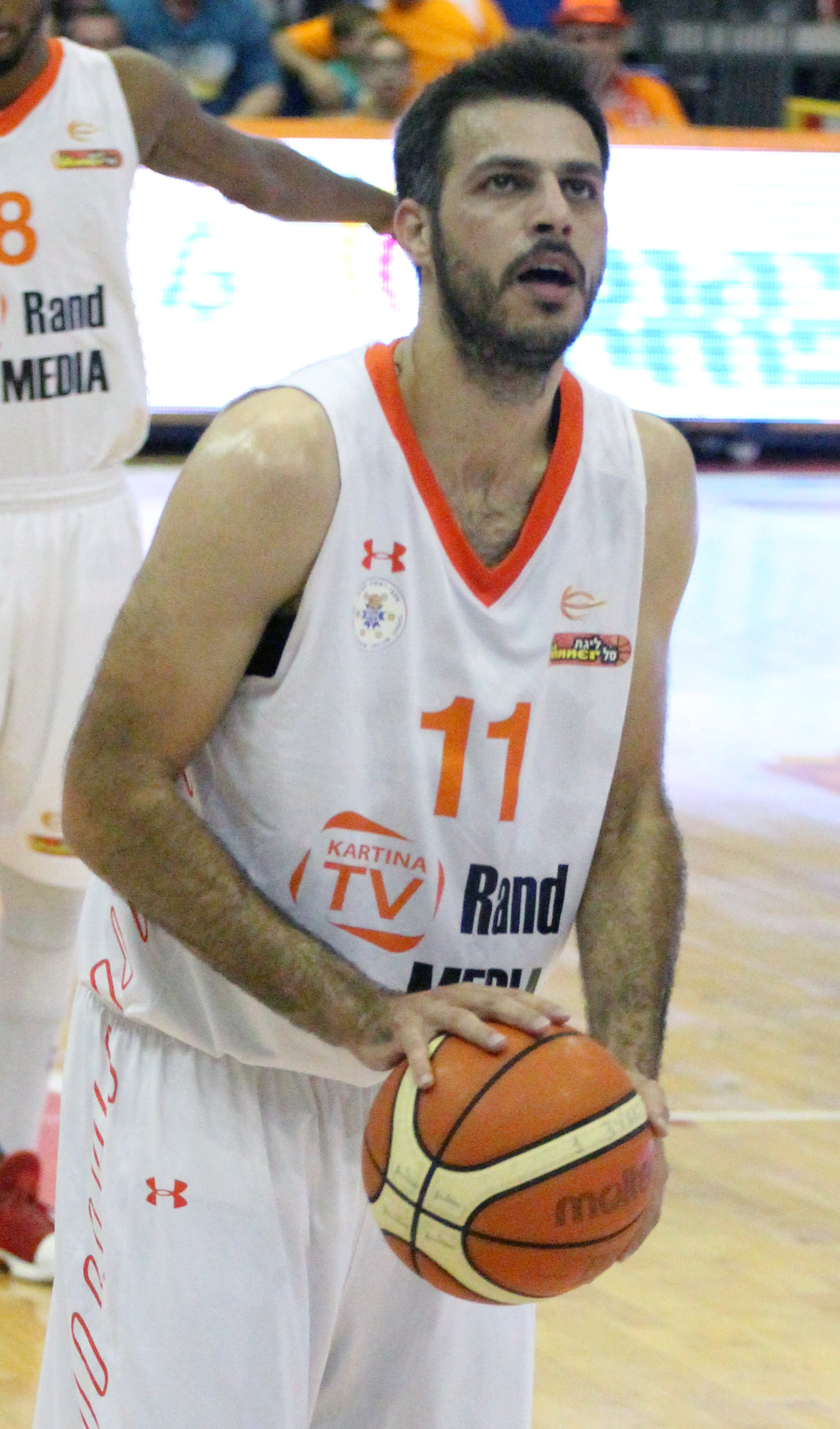
Avi Ben Chimol

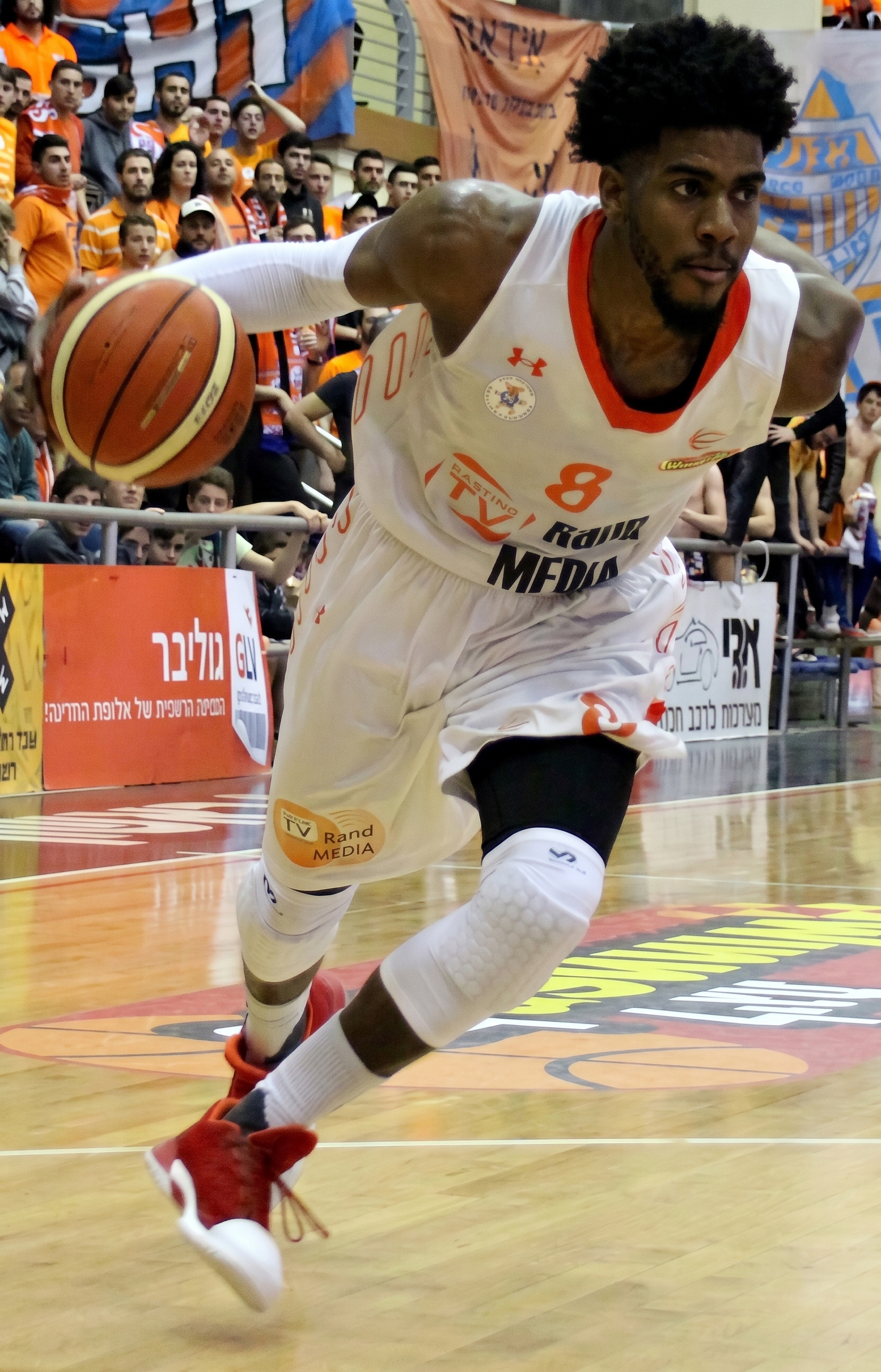
Shawn Dawson

Before the 2009–10 season, the team completely changed its front office. Effi Birnbaum was appointed head coach. Aaron McGhee, Ugonna Onyekwe, and Larry O'Bannon joined as foreign players alongside the Israeli players Avi Ben Chimol and Meir Tapiro. The team finished only 7th. They lost 3–1 to Hapoel Jerusalem in the quarterfinals. In 2010–11 Birnbaum stayed on as head coach, but the players' squad was refreshed. Magee and Tucker stayed, but the latter was later waived in the middle of the season. Isaiah Swann, Dwayne Mitchell, and Raymar Morgan arrived in addition to the Israeli forward Nitzan Hanochi. They finished a good season in 5th place, and beat Bnei Hasharon 3–2 in the quarterfinals. They qualified for the final four, where they were defeated by Maccabi Tel Aviv (100:77), and then by Hapoel Jerusalem in the 3rd place game. Dwayne Mitchell was named to the All-League First Team.

In the '11-'12 season, the team reached, for the second time in their history, the Israel State Cup final, 20 years after their first time. They lost to Maccabi Tel Aviv in Nokia Arena. In the league, Maccabi Rishon LeZion ended the regular season in 3rd place. In the quarterfinals of the playoffs, they met Ironi Ashkelon. Ashkelon won the first two games and were close to sweeping them, but Rishon won three games in a row and reached the final four. In the semi-finals, they lost 75:68 to Maccabi Ashdod, and lost also to Hapoel Holon in the 3rd place game. Kitchen was named to the All-League First Team.

Maccabi Rishon LeZion started the 2012–13 season with Effi Birnbaum as head coach. After 11 games, with only 5 wins, the board decided to terminate Birnbaum's contract and appoint former player and coach Roni Bosani as head coach. The team finished the regular season in 6th place, and lost 3–2 to Hapoel Eilat in the quarterfinals.

Rishon started the 2013–14 season very poorly. Former assistant coach Matan Harush was appointed head coach. He led the team for 11 games, only winning 3 games. The fans began to voice their disappointment, and Harush was fired. A few days later, he was replaced by former Maccabi Tel Aviv and Israel national basketball team coach Zvika Sherf. Even with Sherf, the team suffered from instability. The team replaced many players during the season, but Shawn Dawson and Dror Hajaj stayed. At the end of the season, Rishon and Sherf finished in 10th place, out of 12 teams. They were saved from relegation by a last matchday win.

In the following season, the team finished the regular season in 6th place. In the quarterfinals series, they beat Hapoel Holon (3:1), even without the home-court advantage. In the semi-finals, they lost to Hapoel Jerusalem, 3:0.

==== Champions after fairytale season (2015–16) ====
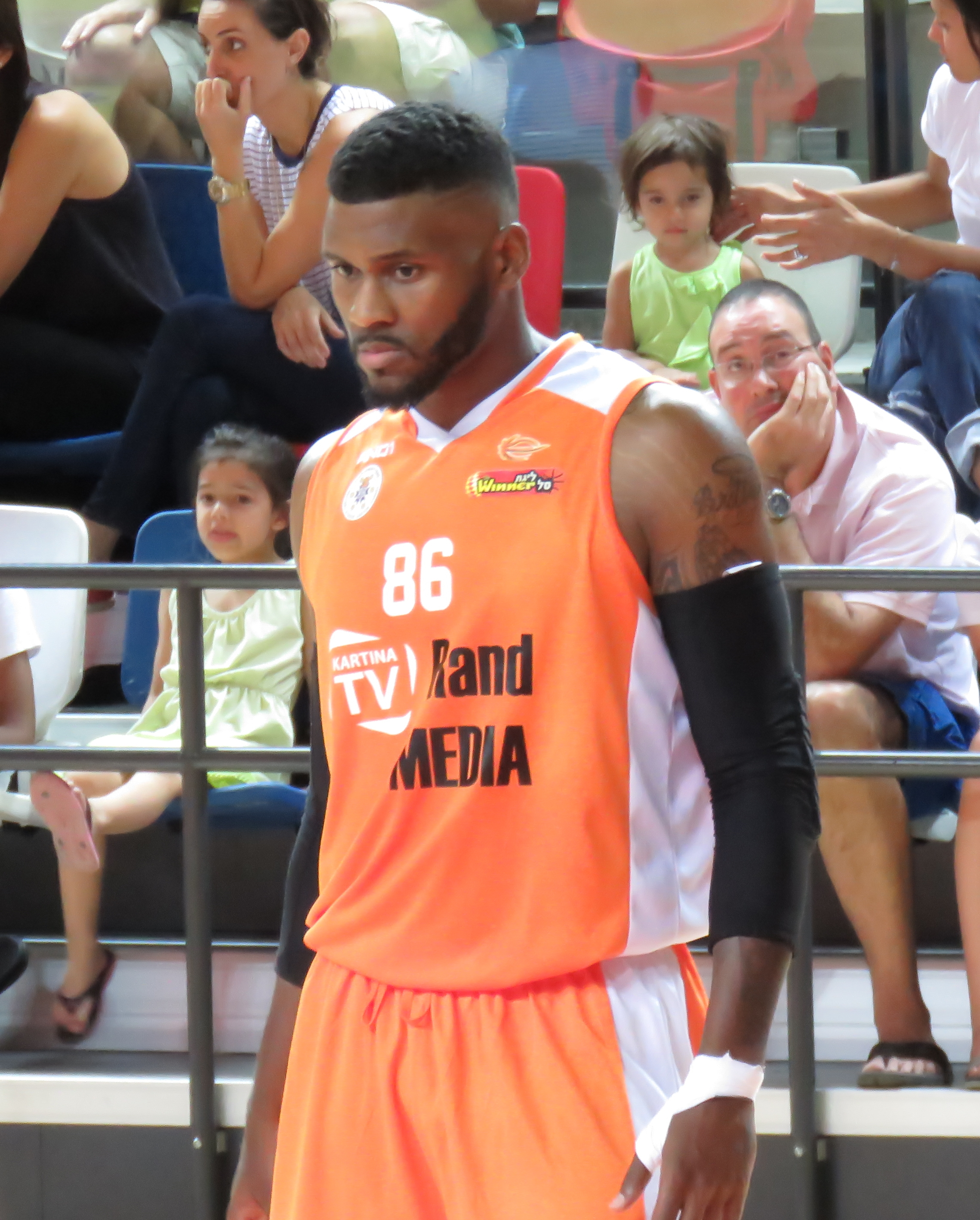
Darryl Monroe

The 2015–16 season was a remarkable one for Rishon LeZion. Sharon Drucker was fired on the 14th of April, and was replaced by Arik Shivek. With some high-quality players such as Darryl Monroe and Mark Lyons, the team finished in sixth place in the regular season and reached the quarter-finals of FIBA Europe Cup. After Rishon Lezion beat the higher-ranked Maccabi Haifa in the playoffs, the team faced Maccabi Tel Aviv in the semi-finals. Rishon stunned the powerhouse team from Tel Aviv, winning 71–69. Rishon LeZion had the right to play in the Israeli League Final for the first time since 1991. On 9 June 2016, the club won their first championship after beating Hapoel Jerusalem 83–77 in the Final, in front of 11,000 spectators at Jerusalem's home arena. Darryl Monroe was named Final Four MVP, after scoring 20 points against Maccabi Tel Aviv and 29 points against Jerusalem.

=== Modern era ===
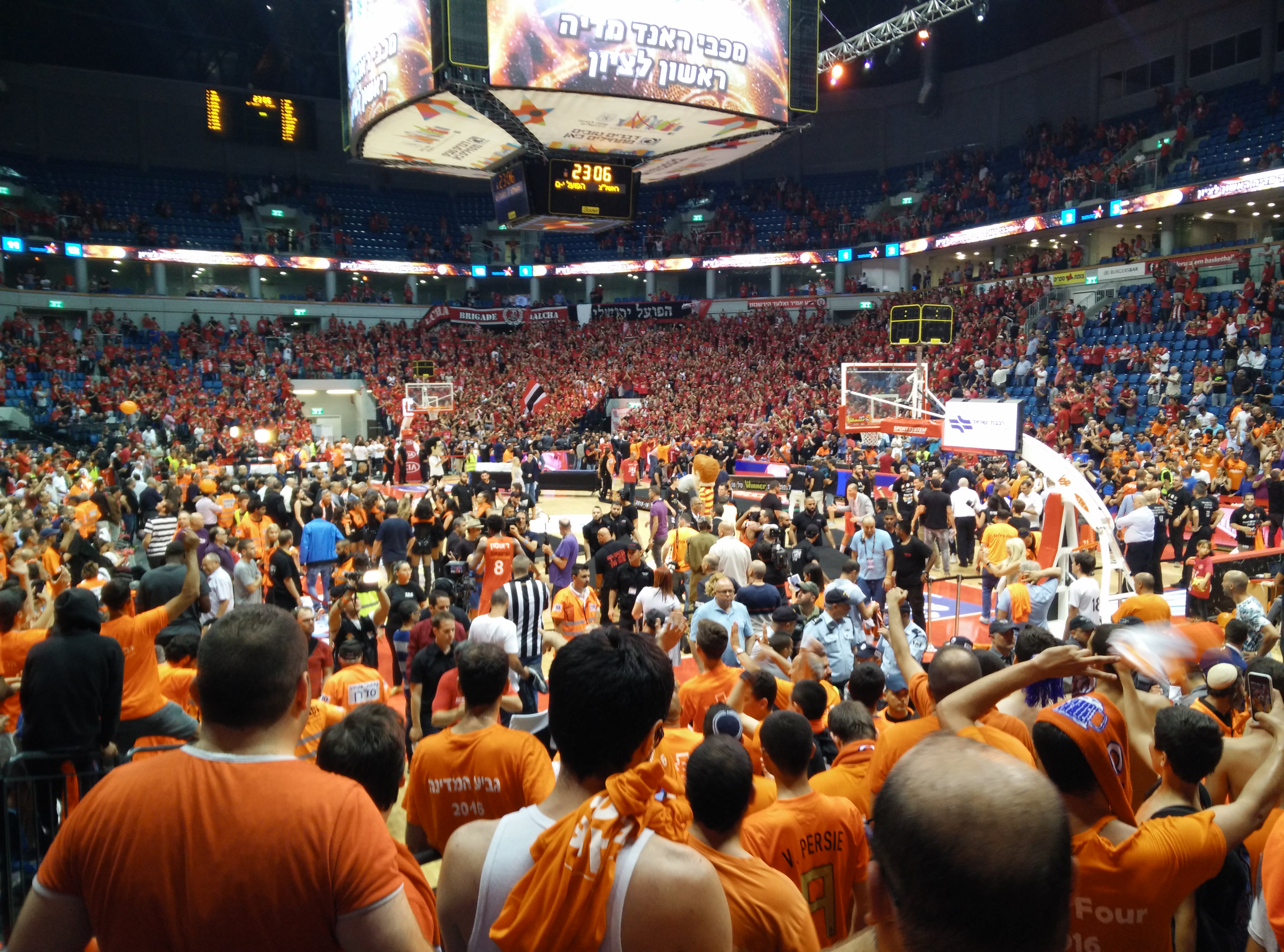
Maccabi Rishon celebrates its first-ever championship in Pais Arena Jerusalem.

At the start of the 2018–19 season, Rishon LeZion won the Israeli Basketball League Cup. In the 2018–19 Premier League season, Maccabi Rishon LeZion was the sixth seed in the regular season but managed to upset third-seeded Hapoel Holon in the playoffs, winning 1–3. In the semi-final of the Final Four, the team surprised Hapoel Jerusalem and won 92–86 to advance to their second-ever final, where they lost to Maccabi Tel Aviv.

In the 2019–20 season, Rishon LeZion advanced to its third-ever Israeli League final, after Adam Ariel hit a buzzer-beater to defeat Hapoel Jerusalem in the semifinal.

In the 2020–2021 season, the team spent most of the season at the bottom of the table, and two rounds before the end of the season, the team was officially relegated to the Liga Leumit, after 34 years in the Premier League.

== Fans and arena ==
=== Gush D ===
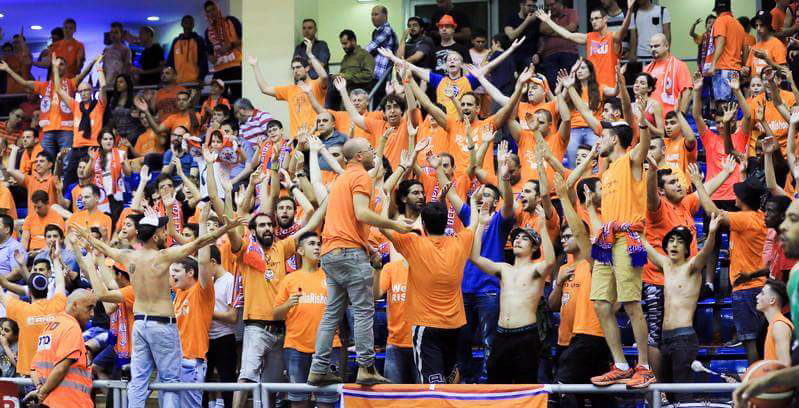
Gush D during a game.

Gush D is the organized group of supporters that follows the team in home games and in away games. The group was founded in 2001, and named after their seating section in the old arena of the club, Gan Nachum. In January 2014, they started to boycott the team's home games due to a conflict with the club's owner, Itzhak Perry. However, they returned to cheer the team only one year later, in January 2015.

=== Gan Nahum Municipal Hall (1984–2008) ===
Gan Nahum Municipal Hall was a multi-purpose sports arena with 1,500 seats. Since its opening in 1986, and until Bet Maccabi opened in 2008, it was the main sports hall in the city. It was the home arena of Maccabi Rishon since its opening day in 1986, and also hosted Maccabi and Hapoel Rishon LeZion handball clubs' home games.

The arena can host volleyball, handball, futsal, and basketball activities. It has only one stand, in the northern side of the building. In the upper floor there are 1,000 seats, and in the lower floor (which is removable) there are 500 seats. Today Gan Nahum Municipal Hall hosts the home games of the Hapoel Rishon LeZion women's basketball team.

== Sponsorship names ==
Due to sponsorship agreements, the club has known several names:

- Maccabi "Israeli Center for Furniture" Rishon LeZion (2006–2009)
- Maccabi "Offici" Rishon LeZion (2009–2012)
- Maccabi "Pandoor Doors" Rishon LeZion (2012–2015)
- Maccabi "RAND MEDIA" Rishon LeZion (2015–2017)
- Maccabi "ILAND.TV" Rishon LeZion (2017–2018)
- Maccabi "Mitcham 1000" Rishon LeZion (2019)
- Maccabi "Winner" Rishon LeZion (2019–present)

== Current roster ==
Maccabi Rishon LeZion roster
Players
Coaches

Pos.	No.	Nat.	Name	Ht.	Wt.	Age
SG	0	(United States)	Jenkins, Chaunce	1.93 m (6 ft 4 in)	80 kg (176 lb)	24 – 20 April 2002
G	1	(United States)	Grant, Qua	1.85 m (6 ft 1 in)	86 kg (190 lb)	26 – 11 December 1999
F/C	2	(United States)	Tillman, Justin	2.03 m (6 ft 8 in)	105 kg (231 lb)	30 – 2 February 1996
F	3	(Israel)	Nekrasevich, Maor	2.02 m (6 ft 8 in)	95 kg (209 lb)	21 – 4 November 2004
G	5	(Israel)	Brisker, Michael	1.85 m (6 ft 1 in)	80 kg (176 lb)	28 – 21 February 1998
F	8	(United States)	King, Tre	2.03 m (6 ft 8 in)	105 kg (231 lb)	27 – 1 October 1999
G	12	(Israel)	Goldman, Yaron	1.95 m (6 ft 5 in)	84 kg (185 lb)	20 – 19 June 2006
G/F	13	(United States)	King, V. J.	1.98 m (6 ft 6 in)	95 kg (209 lb)	29 – 22 January 1997
G/F	16	(Israel)	Zipper, Ron	1.94 m (6 ft 4 in)	95 kg (209 lb)	23 – 24 January 2003
C	20	(Israel)	Zalmanson, Idan	2.06 m (6 ft 9 in)	113 kg (249 lb)	31 – 18 April 1995
PF	22	(United States) (Israel)	Freund, Joshua	2.00 m (6 ft 7 in)	111 kg (245 lb)	29 – 14 May 1997
F/C	33	(Israel)	Gitta, Or	2.03 m (6 ft 8 in)	100 kg (220 lb)	26 – 12 April 2000
G/F	80	(Israel)	Cornelius, Or	1.99 m (6 ft 6 in)	95 kg (209 lb)	29 – 26 September 1997
G	99	(Israel)	Ziv, Yiftach	1.91 m (6 ft 3 in)	88 kg (194 lb)	31 – 9 July 1995

Head coach

- (Israel) Guy Kaplan

Assistant coach(es)

- (Israel) Shlomi Shaked

Legend

- (C) Team captain
- Injured

- Roster
Updated: October 30, 2026

=== Depth chart ===
Pos.	Starting 5	Bench 1	Bench 2
C	Justin Tillman	Idan Zalmanson	Or Gitta
PF	Tre King	Joshua Freund
SF	V. J. King	Or Cornelius	Maor Nekrasevich
SG	Ron Zipper	Chaunce Jenkins	Yaron Goldman
PG	Qua Grant	Michael Brisker	Yiftach Ziv

- The Israeli League rule requires every team to have at least one Israeli on the court at any time.
- There should be at least 7 Israelis and up to 5 foreigners on a 12-men game sheet.

Source: basket.co.il

== Notable players ==
Note: Flags indicate national team eligibility at FIBA-sanctioned events. Players may hold other non-FIBA nationalities not displayed.

Criteria

To appear in this section a player must have either:

- Set a club record or won an individual award while at the club
- Played at least one official international match for their national team at any time
- Played at least one official NBA match at any time.

- (United States) Richard Rellford 1 season: '88-'89
- (Israel) Haim Zlotikman 3 seasons: '88-'89, '90-'92
- (Israel) Miki Berkovich 5 seasons: '88-'93
- (Israel) Motti Aroesti 1 season: '90-'91
- (United States) Andre Spencer 2 seasons: '90-'92
- (United States) Gene Banks 2 seasons: '90-'92
- (United States) David Henderson 1 season: '91-'92
- (Israel) Hen Lippin 1 season: '92-'93
- (United States) Linton Townes 1 season: '92-'93
- (United States) Kevin Magee 1 season: '93-'94
- (United States) Steve Burtt Sr. 1 season: '93-'94
- (United States) Gerald Paddio 2 seasons: '94-'95, '00-'01
- (United States) James Gully 3 seasons: '94-'97
- (United States) (Italy) Brian Oliver 1 season: '95-'96
- (United States) Darren Daye 1 season: '96-'97
- (Israel) Doron Jamchi 3 seasons: '96-'99
- (United States) Dennis Hopson 1 season: '97-'98
- (United States) Brad Sellers 1 season: '97-'98
- (Lithuania) Tomas Pačėsas 1 season: '98-'99
- (United States) (Israel) Deon Thomas 1 season: '98-'99
- (United States) (Israel) Joe Dawson 3 seasons: '98-'01
- (Israel) Afik Nissim 4 seasons: '98-'02
- (United States) Corey Gaines 1 season: '99-'00
- (Israel) Avi Sukar 3 seasons: '00-'02, '08-'09
- (Canada) Rowan Barrett 1 season: '01-'02
- (Israel) Guy Goodes 2 seasons: '02-'04
- (United States) Lucius Davis 2 seasons: '02-'04
- (Israel) Amit Ben-David 5 seasons: '02-'03, '11-'15
- (United States) (Russia) Kelly McCarty 1 season: '03-'04
- (United States) Malik Dixon 1 season: '04-'05
- (United States) Erwin Dudley 1 season: '04-'05
- (United States) (Israel) Tony Younger 3 seasons: '04-'05, '14-'16
- (Israel) Moran Roth 1 season: '05-'06
- (United States) Ryan Sidney 2 seasons: '05-'07
- (United States) Omar Sneed 2 seasons: '05-'06, '07-'08
- (Israel) Oded Shaashoua 4 seasons: '06-'09, '10-'11
- (United States) Jerel Blassingame 1 season: '07-'08
- (United States) Cedrick Banks 1 season: '07-'08
- (Canada) (Dominican Republic) Juan Mendez 1 season: '07-'08
- (United States) Robert Conley 1 season: '08-'09
- (Israel) (Ukraine) Igor Nesterenko 7 seasons: '08-'15
- (Israel) Meir Tapiro 1 season: '09-'10
- (United States) Aaron McGhee 2 seasons: '09-'11
- (United States) Larry O'Bannon 2 seasons: '09-'10, '14
- (Israel) Avi Ben-Chimol 4 seasons: '09-'10, '15-'18
- (Israel) Nitzan Hanochi 7 seasons: '10-'13, '14-'18
- (United States) Isaiah Swann 2 seasons: '10-'11, '14-'15
- (United States) Dwayne Mitchell 2 seasons: '10-'11, '13
- (United States) Raymar Morgan 1 season: '10-'11
- (United States) Derwin Kitchen 1 season: '11-'12
- (United States) Joe Crawford 1 season: '11-'12
- (United States) Brandon Bowman 1 season: '11-'12
- (Jamaica) (United States) Adrian Uter 2 seasons: '11-'13
- (United States) Julian Wright 1 season: '12-'13
- (United States) Lazeric Jones 1 season: '12-'13
- (United States) Willie Warren 1 season: '12-'13
- (Israel) Shawn Dawson 5 seasons: '12-'17
- (United States) Davin White 1 season: '13-'14
- (United States) Jackie Carmichael 1 season: '14-'15
- (United States) Chris Wright 1 season: '15-'16
- (United States) Mark Lyons 1 season: '15-'16
- (United States) Darryl Monroe 2 seasons: '15-'16, '19-present
- (Israel) Idan Zalmanson 3 seasons: '15-'18
- (United States) Charles Thomas 1 season: '16-'17
- (United States) Cameron Long 2 seasons: '16-'17, '18-'19
- (United States) Keith Langford 1 season: '17-'18
- (Kosovo) Lis Shoshi 1 season: '21
- (Israel) Noam Dovrat (born 2002)
- (Israel) Erez Markovich (born 1978)

== Season by season ==
Season	Tier	League	Pos.	Israeli Cup	League Cup	European competitions		
2011–12	1	Premier League	3rd	Runner-up	Semifinalist			
2012–13	1	Premier League	6th	Round of 16	Quarterfinalist			
2013–14	1	Premier League	10th	Semifinalist	Quarterfinalist			
2014–15	1	Premier League	4th	Quarterfinalist	-			
2015–16	1	Premier League	1st	Semifinalist	Semifinalist	3 FIBA Europe Cup	QF	11–6
2016–17	1	Premier League	4th	Round of 16	Semifinalist	3 Champions League	POQ	7–9
2017–18	1	Premier League	11th	Quarterfinalist	Semifinalist			
2018–19	1	Premier League	2nd	Runner-up	Champion			
2019–20	1	Premier League	2nd	Semifinalist	First round	2 EuroCup	RS	2–8
2020–21	1	Premier League	9th	Runner-up	Semifinalist	R Balkan League	2RPO	3–2
2021–22	1	Premier League	16th	—	Quarterfinalist			
2022–23	2	Liga Leumit	QF	—	—			
2023–24	2	Liga Leumit	QF	—	—			
2024–25	2	Liga Leumit	1st	—	—			

== Honors ==
- Israeli Premier League
  - Champions (1): 2015–16
    - Runners-up (2): 2018–19, 2019–20
- Israeli Cup

- Runners-up (4): 1991–92, 2011–12, 2018–19, 2020–21

- Israeli League Cup
  - Winners (1): 2018
