= Eric Griffin (basketball) =

American basketball player (born 1990)

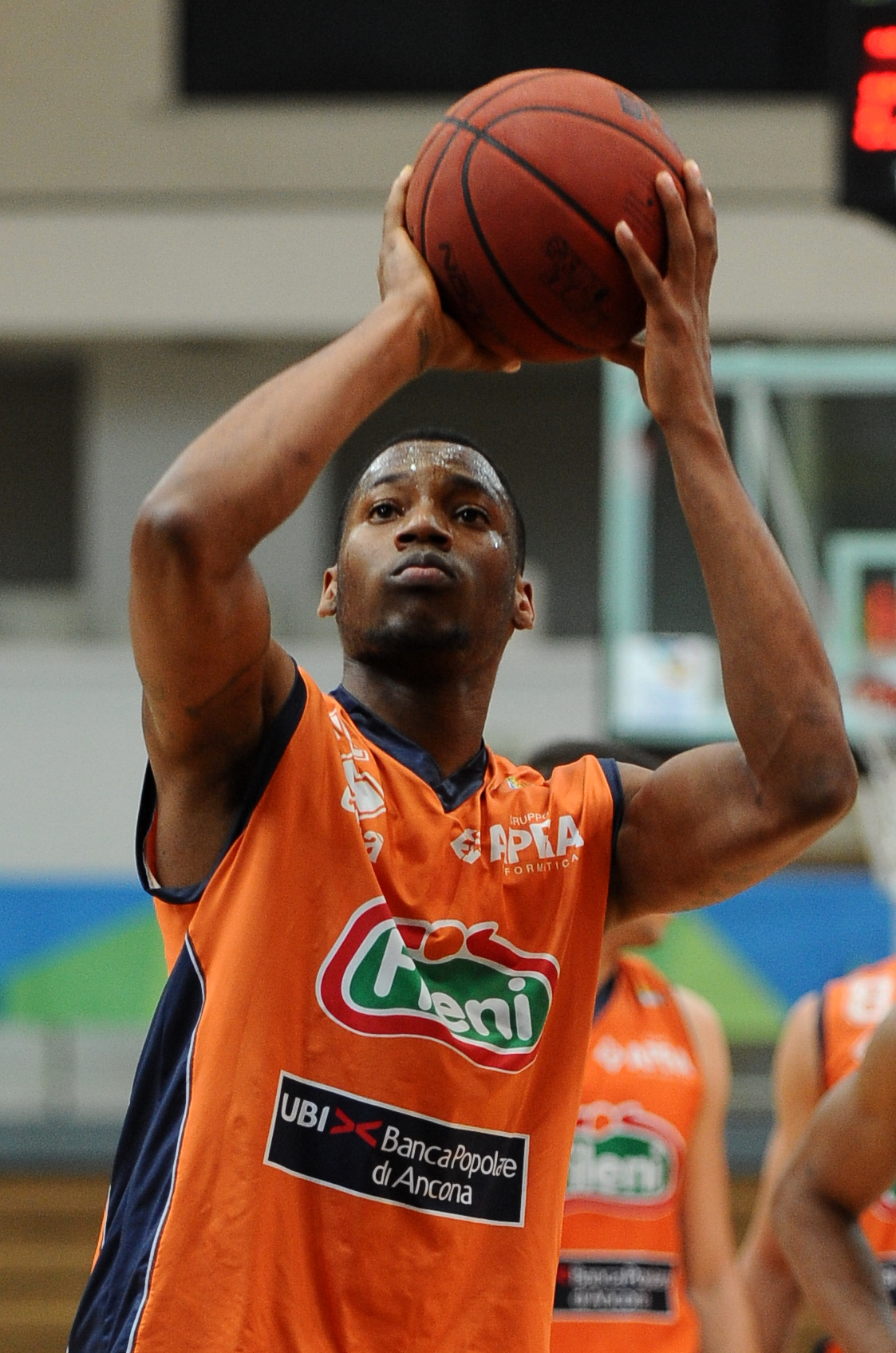
- Griffin with Fileni Jesi in December 2012

Free agent
- Position: Power forward

Personal information
- Born: May 26, 1990 (age 36) Orlando, Florida, U.S.
- Listed height: 6 ft 8 in (2.03 m)
- Listed weight: 205 lb (93 kg)

Career information
- High school: Evans (Orlando, Florida); Boone (Orlando, Florida)
- College: Hiwassee CC (2008–2009); Garden City CC (2009–2010); Campbell (2010–2012)
- NBA draft: 2012: undrafted
- Playing career: 2012–present

Career history
- 2012–2013: Fileni BPA Jesi
- 2014: Leones de Ponce
- 2014: Guaros de Lara
- 2014: Indios de San Francisco de Macorís
- 2014–2015: Texas Legends
- 2015: Leones de Ponce
- 2015–2016: Al-Nasr Dubai
- 2016–2017: Hapoel Gilboa Galil
- 2017: Salt Lake City Stars
- 2018: Hapoel Eilat
- 2018: Pallacanestro Reggiana
- 2019: Basket Zielona Góra
- 2019: Ironi Nahariya
- 2019–2020: Adelaide 36ers
- 2020: Leones de Ponce
- 2020–2021: Hapoel Be'er Sheva
- 2021–2022: AEK Athens
- 2022–2023: Hapoel Eilat
- 2023: Cariduros de Fajardo
- 2023: Peñarol
- 2023: Tainan TSG GhostHawks
- 2023–2024: Hapoel Haifa
- 2024: Piratas de Quebradillas
- 2024: Hapoel Be'er Sheva
- 2025: Paisas Basketball
- 2025: Ironi Nahariya
- 2026: Pioneros de Los Mochis
- 2026: Santos del Potosí

Career highlights
- Israeli League All-Star (2017); Israeli League slam dunk champion (2017); Israeli League blocks leader (2019); All-NBA D-League Third Team (2015); NBA D-League All-Defensive Second Team (2015); NBA D-League All-Star (2015); 2× Puerto Rican League champion (2014, 2015); First-team All-Big South (2012)
- Stats at Basketball Reference

Eric Londery Griffin (born May 26, 1990) is an American professional basketball player who last played for the Santos del Potosí of the Liga Nacional de Baloncesto Profesional. He played college basketball for Hiwassee College, Garden City CC, and Campbell University before playing professionally in Italy, Puerto Rico, Venezuela, the United Arab Emirates, Dominican Republic, Israel, Poland, Australia, Greece, Uruguay, Taiwan, Colombia and Mexico.

== High school and college career ==
Griffin attended Maynard Evans High School in Orlando, Florida, before transferring to Boone High School for his senior year after being cut multiple times from the basketball team at Evans.

Griffin played his first year of college basketball for Hiwassee College, where he averaged 16 points, six rebounds and two blocks per game in 2008–09. After Hiwassee lost its accreditation in 2009, he transferred to Garden City Community College where he averaged 8.1 points, 6.5 rebounds, and 1.6 blocks in 32 games in 2009–10.

In 2010, Griffin transferred to Campbell University. In his junior season, he scored in double figures 20 times, had five double-digit rebounding nights and set a school single-season Division I era (since 1977–78) record with 61 blocked shots. In 29 games (22 starts), he averaged 13.2 points, 6.9 rebounds, 1.0 assists, 1.7 steals and 2.1 blocks in 28.1 minutes per game.

As a senior in 2011–12, Griffin was named to the All-Big South Conference first team. In his two-year career at Campbell, he finished with the school's highest career field goal percentage (.559) and ranks third on the school's all-time blocks list with 134 rejections. In 31 games, he averaged 15.7 points, 8.6 rebounds, 1.5 assists and 2.4 blocks in 30.3 minutes per game.

== Professional career ==
=== 2012–13 season ===
After going undrafted in the 2012 NBA draft, Griffin joined the Los Angeles Lakers for the 2012 NBA Summer League. On July 27, 2012, he signed with Fileni BPA Jesi of Italy for the 2012–13 season. In 28 games for Fileni, he averaged 17.5 points, 7.1 rebounds, 1.2 assists, 1.8 steals and 1.3 blocks per game.

=== 2013–14 season ===
In July 2013, Griffin joined the Miami Heat for the 2013 NBA Summer League. On September 10, 2013, he signed with the Heat, but was later waived on October 26 after appearing in seven preseason games.

In December 2013, Griffin signed with Leones de Ponce of Puerto Rico for the 2014 Americas League. In February 2014, he signed with Guaros de Lara of Venezuela for the rest of the 2014 LPB season. He left Guaros de Lara the following month after appearing in just six games. He later signed with Indios de San Francisco de Macorís of the Liga Nacional de Baloncesto in May. In 17 games for Indios, he averaged 13.1 points, 4.3 rebounds and 1.1 assists and 1.3 blocks per game.

=== 2014–15 season ===
In July 2014, Griffin joined the Dallas Mavericks for the 2014 NBA Summer League. On July 18, he signed with the Mavericks, but was later waived on October 21 after appearing in two preseason games. On November 3, 2014, he was acquired by the Texas Legends of the NBA Development League as an affiliate player of the Mavericks. On February 4, 2015, he was named to the Futures All-Star team for the 2015 NBA D-League All-Star Game. In 49 games for Texas in 2014–15, he averaged 19.0 points, 6.6 rebounds, 1.9 assists, 1.3 steals and 2.4 blocks per game.

On April 15, 2015, Griffin returned to Leones de Ponce, signing with them for the rest of the 2015 BSN season. In 14 games for Leones, he averaged 10.1 points, 3.8 rebounds, 1.3 assists and 1.0 blocks per game.

=== 2015–16 season ===
In July 2015, Griffin joined the Los Angeles Clippers for the Orlando Summer League and the Cleveland Cavaliers for the Las Vegas Summer League. He signed with the Detroit Pistons on September 28, 2015, but was waived on October 7.

On November 10, 2015, Griffin signed with UAE basketball club Al-Nasr Dubai. His final game for Al-Nasr came on April 16, 2016.

=== 2016–17 season ===
On August 18, 2016, Griffin signed with Hapoel Gilboa Galil of the Israeli Basketball Premier League. On April 18, 2017, Griffin participated in the Israeli League All-Star Game and won the Slam Dunk Contest during the same event. Griffin played 33 games for Gilboa Galil and averaged 14.9 points, 7.1 rebounds, 1.6 assists, 1.0 steals and 1.8 blocks per game.

=== 2017–18 season ===
On July 3, 2017, Griffin signed with Pallacanestro Cantù of the Serie A. Prior to joining Cantù, he played for the Utah Jazz's Summer League team in both Utah and Las Vegas. After impressing during the Summer League, he opted out of his deal with Cantù and signed a two-way contract with the Jazz on July 20, 2017. He played 19 games for the Utah's G League affiliate, the Salt Lake City Stars, before being waived by the Jazz on December 21, 2017. He did not appear in a game for the Jazz during his time with them.

On January 26, 2018, Griffin returned to Israel for a second stint, signing with Hapoel Eilat for the rest of the season. On February 4, 2018, he made his debut in a 72–84 loss to Hapoel Jerusalem, recording 13 points and 8 rebounds off the bench. On June 3, 2018, Griffin recorded a season-high 30 points, shooting 10-of-13 from the field, along with 7 rebounds and 2 assists in an 81–87 playoff loss to Hapoel Holon.

=== 2018–19 season ===
On July 23, 2018, Griffin signed with the Italian club Pallacanestro Reggiana. On December 13, he parted ways with Reggiana after appearing in six games. On January 1, 2019, Griffin signed with the Polish team Stelmet Zielona Gora for the rest of the season. However, on January 16, 2019, Griffin parted ways with Zielona Góra after appearing in two games.

On January 17, 2019, Griffin returned to Israel for a third stint, signing with Ironi Nahariya for the rest of the season. Two days later, he made his debut in a 93–103 loss to Ironi Nes Ziona, recording 17 points, eight rebounds and three blocks off the bench.

=== 2019–20 season ===
On June 24, 2019, Griffin signed with the Adelaide 36ers for the 2019–20 NBL season. He averaged 14 points, 6.2 rebounds and 1.2 blocks per game.

In March 2020, Griffin had a three-game stint in Puerto Rico for Leones de Ponce.

=== 2020–21 season ===
On September 5, 2020, Griffin signed with Hapoel Be'er Sheva of the Israeli Premier League. In 25 games, he recorded 17.9 points, 6.8 rebounds, 1.5 assists and 1.0 blocks per game.

=== 2021–22 season ===
On August 23, 2021, Griffin signed a two-year deal with AEK Athens of the Greek Basket League and the Basketball Champions League. In 15 league games, he averaged 10 points, 4.3 rebounds, 0.9 assists, 0.5 steals and 1 block, playing around 27 minutes per contest. His contract was terminated on July 1, 2022.

=== 2022–23 season ===
On August 4, 2022, Griffin signed with Hapoel Eilat of the Israeli Basketball Premier League, returning to the team for a second stint.

Between May 21 and June 13, 2023, Griffin played nine games for Cariduros de Fajardo in Puerto Rico.

=== 2023–24 season ===
In October 2023, Griffin played three games for Peñarol in the Liga Sudamericana as well as one LUB game.

On November 22, 2023, Griffin signed with Tainan TSG GhostHawks of the T1 League. His contract was terminated on December 30 after he appeared in three games. That same day, he signed with Hapoel Haifa for the rest of the 2023–24 Israeli League season. He played seven games for Hapoel Haifa between January 5 and February 4, 2024.

In June 2024, Griffin joined Piratas de Quebradillas of the Baloncesto Superior Nacional.

=== 2024–25 season ===
On July 31, 2024, Griffin signed with Hapoel Be'er Sheva of the Israeli Premier League, returning to the club for a second stint. He left the team in December 2024 after appearing in seven games to start the 2024–25 Israeli Basketball Premier League.

In January 2025, Griffin joined Paisas Basketball of the Basketball Champions League Americas. After playing six games for Paisas, he returned to Israel and joined Ironi Nahariya, playing nine games between April 1 and May 18 to finish the 2024–25 Israeli Basketball National League.

=== 2025–26 season ===
In March 2026, Griffin joined Pioneros de Los Mochis of the Mexican CIBACOPA. In 24 games, he averaged 10.3 points, 5.9 rebounds and 1.2 assists per game.

=== 2026–27 season ===
In August 2026, Griffin joined Santos del Potosí of the Mexican Liga Nacional de Baloncesto Profesional (LNBP). He appeared in six games between August 15 and August 25.

== Personal life ==
Griffin is the son of James Martin and Alma Bracy, and has three siblings: Bacarrai Bracy, Damien King and Adrian King.

In June 2016, the State of Florida dropped a two-month-old charge of attempted first degree murder with a firearm against Griffin. Griffin and a friend had been arrested in late April 2016 for an Orlando-area shooting that involved 24-year-old Treavor Glover. The Florida State Attorney's Office determined that it was not suitable for prosecution, finding that Griffin was falsely identified (the victim described the man who shot him as being "around 6-foot to 6-2"; Griffin is 6-9) while determining that Griffin had an alibi (his alarm system was on the night of the shooting until the following morning, and a motion detector picked him up as movement in a hallway).
