= Ryan Sidney =

American basketball player

Ryan Geoffrey J. I. Sidney (born May 25, 1982) is an American former basketball player who played as a shooting guard (listed 6'2"/1.88 m).

== Early life ==
Sidney was born on May 25, 1982 in Ann Arbor, Michigan.

== College career ==
Sidney played college ball for Boston College from the Big East Conference between 2000 and 2003, where he based himself as the team's sixth man and was part in the college's transition from being last in the conference to winning it twice, and holding the Win-Lose odd record in the team's history. They managed to make it to the NCAA Division I but not to the higher stages in it. In one of the workouts he broke his jaw and played with a cast for two months. During his 3rd year there (2002/2003) his eldest son was born, and he was involved in a turning point event: his best friend and teammate, Andrew Bryant, was kept hostage in the Rubenstein Dorms just a few floors beneath Sidney's apartment by a man from another college, a man knocked on Sidney's door and informed him on the event, Sidney rushed down and tried to negotiate with the gun holder, the authorities arrested all three present in the scene, Sidney was cleared of charges but decided to drop out of college for "personal reasons", his chances of being picked in the NBA draft suffered a decline. He then decided to finish his degree in Cheyney University of Pennsylvania, the small school played in the NCAA Division II, by the end of the year (2003/2004) Sidney registered to the 2004 NBA draft and went undrafted.

== Professional career ==
He moved overseas and played for Mersin Büyükşehir Belediyesi S.K. from the Turkish 2nd Division, where he proven himself to be above the league's standards, leading the league with 30.2 points per game, his team won the title and advanced to the Turkish Premier League.

In the summer of 2005 Sidney signed with the Israeli medium-sized club Maccabi Rishon LeZion from the Israeli Basketball Super League coached by Guy Goodes, and managed to contribute in leading the team to the league's Final Four in 2005/2006 and alongside being the fans' favorite, he was named All-Israeli League Defensive Team. In the summer of 2006, following the Second Lebanon War, Sidney was the only foreign player from the previous season to be signed for the 2006/2007 season, where the team played in the FIBA Eurocup Challenge, however his stats were not the same during the year and he was released in January 2007 to make room for American power forward/center Brandon Kurtz and left for playing in a minor league in the United States.

He then proceeded for playing in Spain and Italy for brief stints and finished his career in Aliağa Petkim from the Turkish Premier League for the 2007/2008 season, when he decided to quit professional basketball.

== After retirement ==
Between 2008-2010 he worked as a bartender according to his LinkedIn profile. In 2009, he gave an interview about his career to the Boston College paper and stated he's now a contractor who own a construction company in his hometown of Ann Arbor, Michigan and that he's not regretting about his career choices (mentioning that by the age of 27 he already filled 3 passports, and traveled around the Middle East, Egypt, Dubai and Greece). In 2010, he played in the amateur Northville, Michigan league for the "Champs" team.
