= Maxim Romanov =

Russian rugby league footballer

Maxim Romanov (birth date unknown) is a Russian rugby league footballer who plays as a loose forward for the Kazan Arrows in the Championship of Russia competition.

== Background ==
Maxim Romanov was born in Kazan, Russia.

== Playing career ==
Romanov has represented the Russian national side on several occasions, most notably at the 2000 World Cup.
