= Qua Grant =

American basketball player

No. 1 – Maccabi Rishon LeZion
- Position: Point guard
- League: Israeli Basketball Premier League

Personal information
- Born: December 11, 1999 (age 26) Waxahachie, Texas, U.S.
- Listed height: 6 ft 1 in (1.85 m)
- Listed weight: 190 lb (86 kg)

Career information
- High school: Waxahachie (Waxahachie, Texas)
- College: West Texas A&M (2018–2021); Wichita State (2021–2022); Sam Houston (2022–2023)
- NBA draft: 2023: undrafted
- Playing career: 2023–present

Career history
- 2023–2024: Helsinki Seagulls
- 2024: Prishtina
- 2024–present: Maccabi Rishon LeZion

Career highlights
- WAC Player of the Year (2023); First-team All-WAC (2023); WAC All-Newcomer team (2023); LSC Player of the Year (2020); 2× First-team All-LSC (2020, 2021)

Mar'Qualen Grant (born 11 December, 1999) is an American professional basketball player for Maccabi Rishon LeZion of the Israeli Basketball Premier League. He played college basketball for the West Texas A&M Buffaloes, Wichita State Shockers and Sam Houston Bearkats.

== High school career ==
Grant attended Waxahachie High School. He did not have a single Division I offer out of high school and committed to play college basketball at Division II West Texas A&M.

== College career ==
As a freshman, Grant averaged 14.9 points and 5.0 rebounds per game, earning Lone Star Conference Freshman of the Year honors. He averaged 20.7 points and 7.5 rebounds per game as a sophomore. Grant earned Division II All-American honors and was named Lone Star Conference Player of the Year. As a junior, he averaged 22.4 points, 8 rebounds and 3.2 assists per game. Grant was named to the first team All-Lone Star Conference and LSC All-Defensive team. Following the season he transferred to Wichita State.

Grant averaged 4.5 points and 1.8 assists per game as a reserve guard. He transferred to Sam Houston for his final season of eligibility. Grant averaged 14.2 points, 4.2 rebounds, 4.1 assists and 1.9 steals per game at Sam Houston. At the conclusion of the season he was named WAC Player of the Year.

== Professional career ==
After going undrafted in the 2023 NBA draft, Grant signed a contract with the Helsinki Seagulls on July 27, 2023.
