= Turkish basketball clubs in international competitions =

Turkish basketball clubs in European and worldwide competitions is the performance record of men's professional basketball clubs from Turkey's top-tier level league, the Basketbol Süper Ligi (BSL), in international competitions.

== The finals ==
=== European-wide competitions ===
Season	Clubs	Result	Opponents	Date	Venue	
FIBA European Champions Cup & EuroLeague (1st tier)
1999–2000	Efes Pilsen (Turkey)	75–69	(Spain) FC Barcelona	20/04/2000	P.A.O.K. Sports Arena, Thessaloniki	
2000–01	Efes Pilsen (Turkey)	91–85	(Russia) CSKA Moscow	13/05/2001	Palais Omnisports de Paris-Bercy, Paris	
2015–16	Fenerbahçe (Turkey)	96–101	(Russia) CSKA Moscow	15/05/2016	Mercedes-Benz Arena, Berlin	
2016–17	Fenerbahçe (Turkey)	80–64	(Greece) Olympiacos	21/05/2017	Sinan Erdem Dome, Istanbul	
2017–18	Fenerbahçe Doğuş (Turkey)	80–85	(Spain) Real Madrid	20/05/2018	Štark Arena, Belgrade	
2018–19	Anadolu Efes (Turkey)	83–91	(Russia) CSKA Moscow	19/05/2019	Fernando Buesa Arena, Vitoria-Gasteiz	
2020–21	Anadolu Efes (Turkey)	86–81	(Spain) FC Barcelona	30/05/2021	Lanxess Arena, Cologne	
2021–22	Anadolu Efes (Turkey)	58–57	(Spain) Real Madrid	21/05/2022	Štark Arena, Belgrade	
2024–25	Fenerbahçe Beko (Turkey)	81–70	(France) Monaco	25/05/2025	Etihad Arena, Abu Dhabi	
FIBA Saporta Cup (2nd tier)
1992–93	Efes Pilsen (Turkey)	48–50	(Greece) Sato Aris	16/03/1993	PalaRuffini, Turin	
EuroCup Basketball (2nd tier)
2014–15	Banvit (Turkey)	n/a	semi-finalist			
2015–16	Galatasaray Odeabank (Turkey)	140–133 (two-leg)	(France) SIG Strasbourg	22 & 27/04/2016	Rhénus Sport, Strasbourg	Abdi İpekçi Arena, Istanbul
2017–18	Darüşşafaka (Turkey)	148–137 (two-leg)	(Russia) Lokomotiv Kuban	10 & 13/04/2018	Basket-Hall, Krasnodar	Volkswagen Arena, Istanbul
2021–22	Frutti Extra Bursaspor (Turkey)	67–80	(Italy) Virtus Segafredo Bologna	11/05/2022	Virtus Segafredo Arena, Bologna	
2022–23	Türk Telekom (Turkey)	67–71	(Spain) Gran Canaria	03/05/2023	Gran Canaria Arena, Las Palmas	
2023–24	Beşiktaş Emlakjet (Turkey)	n/a	semi-finalist			
2024–25	Bahçeşehir Koleji (Turkey)	n/a	semi-finalist			
FIBA Korać Cup (3rd tier)
1995–96	Efes Pilsen (Turkey)	146–145 (two-leg)	(Italy) Stefanel Milano	06 & 13/03/1996	Abdi İpekçi Arena, Istanbul	Forum di Milanofiori, Assago
1996–97	Tofaş (Turkey)	147–154 (two-leg)	(Greece) Aris	26/03 & 03/04/1997	Alexandreio Melathron, Thessaloniki	Bursa Atatürk Spor Salonu, Bursa
FIBA EuroChallenge (3rd tier)
2011–12	Beşiktaş Milangaz (Turkey)	91–86	(France) Élan Chalon	29/04/2012	Főnix Hall, Debrecen	
2012–13	Pınar Karşıyaka (Turkey)	76–77	(Russia) Krasnye Krylia	28/04/2013	Karşıyaka Arena, İzmir	
2013–14	Royal Halı Gaziantep (Turkey)	87–75	(Hungary) Szolnoki Olaj	27/04/2014	PalaDozza, Bologna	
2014–15	Trabzonspor Medical Park (Turkey)	63–64	(France) JSF Nanterre	26/04/2015	Hayri Gür Arena, Trabzon	
Basketball Champions League (3rd tier)
2016–17	Banvit (Turkey)	59–63	(Spain) Iberostar Tenerife	30/04/2017	Santiago Martín, San Cristóbal de La Laguna	
2020–21	Pınar Karşıyaka (Turkey)	59–64	(Spain) San Pablo Burgos	09/05/2021	Trade Union Sport Palace, Nizhny Novgorod	
2024–25	Galatasaray (Turkey)	67–83	(Spain) Unicaja	11/05/2025	SUNEL Arena, Athens	
FIBA EuroCup Challenge (4th tier)
2003–04	Tuborg Pilsener (Turkey)	94–53	(Russia) Dynamo Moscow Region	28/03/2004	İzmir Atatürk Sports Hall, İzmir	
FIBA Europe Cup (4th tier)
2019–20	Pınar Karşıyaka (Turkey)	n/a	semi-finalist^{1}			
2019–20	Bahçeşehir Koleji (Turkey)	n/a	semi-finalist^{1}			
2021–22	Bahçeşehir Koleji (Turkey)	162–143 (two-leg)	(Italy) UnaHotels Reggio Emilia	20 & 27/04/2022	Unipol Arena, Casalecchio di Reno	Ülker Sports Arena, Istanbul
2023–24	Bahçeşehir Koleji (Turkey)	179–180 (two-leg)	(Germany) Niners Chemnitz	17 & 24/04/2023	Messe Chemnitz, Chemnitz	Ülker Sports Arena, Istanbul

- ^Note 1 – Season not finished due to COVID-19 pandemic in Europe

=== World-wide competitions ===
Season	Clubs	Result	Opponents	Date	Venue
FIBA International Christmas Tournament
1996	Efes Pilsen (Turkey)	3rd in League stage	(Spain) Real Madrid Teka, (Greece) Olympiacos, (Italy) Scavolini Pesaro		
2003	Ülker (Turkey)	78–86	(Spain) Real Madrid	25/12/2003	Raimundo Saporta Pavilion, Madrid

== Turkish clubs in EuroLeague (1st tier) ==
=== Season to season ===
Year	Team	_______ Earlier stage _______	________ Last 24 to 32 ________	________ Last 12 to 16 ________	_________ Last 6 to 8 _________	_________ Semifinals _________	____________ Final ____________
1958	Modaspor		(Socialist Federal Republic of Yugoslavia) AŠK Olimpija				
1958–59
1959–60	Fenerbahçe		(Israel) Maccabi Tel Aviv	(Bulgaria) Academic			
1960–61	Galatasaray		(Greece) Olympiacos	(Israel) Hapoel Tel Aviv			
1961–62	Darüşşafaka			(Israel) Hapoel Tel Aviv	(Soviet Union) Dinamo Tbilisi		
1962–63	Darüşşafaka			(Hungary) Honvéd			
1963–64	Galatasaray		(Greece) AEK	(Romania) Steaua București			
1964–65	Galatasaray		(Bulgaria) Lokomotiv Sofia				
1965–66	Fenerbahçe		(Romania) Dinamo București				
1966–67	Galatasaray		(Hungary) Honvéd				
1967–68	Altinordu			(Czechoslovakia) Spartak ZJŠ Brno			
1968–69	İTÜ		(Poland) Wisła Kraków	(Israel) Maccabi Tel Aviv			
1969–70	Galatasaray		(Austria) Engelmann Wien				
1970–71	İTÜ		(Albania) Partizani Tirana	(Czechoslovakia) Slavia VŠ Praha			
1971–72	İTÜ		(Austria) Radio Koch Wien				
1972–73	İTÜ		(Austria) Wienerberger				
1973–74	İTÜ		(Belgium) Ford Antwerpen				
1974–75	Muhafızgücü		(Netherlands) Transol RZ				
1975–76	Beşiktaş		(Switzerland) Federale				
1976–77	Eczacıbaşı		3rd of 4 teams				
1977–78	Eczacıbaşı		3rd of 4 teams				
1978–79	Eczacıbaşı		3rd of 3 teams				
1979–80	Efes Pilsen		4th of 4 teams				
1980–81	Eczacıbaşı		3rd of 4 teams				
1981–82	Eczacıbaşı		3rd of 4 teams				
1982–83	Eczacıbaşı		(Italy) Billy Milano				
1983–84	Efes Pilsen		(Spain) FC Barcelona				
1984–85	Efes Pilsen		(Czechoslovakia) Rudá hvězda Pardubice	(Italy) Banco di Roma Virtus			
1985–86	Galatasaray		(Socialist Federal Republic of Yugoslavia) Cibona				
1986–87	Galatasaray		(Poland) Zagłębie	(Soviet Union) Žalgiris			
1987–88	Karşıyaka			(France) Orthez			
1988–89	Eczacıbaşı		(Czechoslovakia) Zbrojovka Brno				
1989–90	Eczacıbaşı		(Poland) Lech Poznań				
1990–91	Galatasaray		(Albania) Vllaznia	(Socialist Federal Republic of Yugoslavia) Pop 84			
1991–92	Fenerbahçe		(Spain) FC Barcelona				
1992–93	Efes Pilsen	(Switzerland) Benetton Fribourg Olympic	(France) Pau-Orthez				
1993–94	Efes Pilsen		(Lithuania) Žalgiris	1st of 8 teams	(Spain) Banca Catalana FC Barcelona		
1994–95	Efes Pilsen		(Sweden) Kärcher Hisings-Kärra	6th of 8 teams			
1995–96	Ülker		(Belgium) Sunair Oostende	4th of 8 teams	(Spain) Banca Catalana FC Barcelona		
1996–97	Efes Pilsen	1st of 6 teams	1st of 6 teams	(Israel) Maccabi Tel Aviv	(France) ASVEL		
1996–97	Ülker	4th of 6 teams	5th of 6 teams				
1997–98	Efes Pilsen	2nd of 6 teams	2nd of 6 teams	(Croatia) Cibona	(Italy) Benetton Treviso		
1997–98	Türk Telekom PTT	4th of 6 teams	5th of 6 teams				
1997–98	Ülker	5th of 6 teams	5th of 6 teams				
1998–99	Ülker	4th of 6 teams	4th of 6 teams	(Lithuania) Žalgiris			
1998–99	Efes Pilsen	2nd of 6 teams	2nd of 6 teams	(Russia) CSKA Moscow	(Lithuania) Žalgiris		
1998–99	Fenerbahçe	2nd of 6 teams	2nd of 6 teams	(Spain) Real Madrid Teka			
1999–00	Tofaş	5th of 6 teams	5th of 6 teams				
1999–00	Efes Pilsen	1st of 6 teams	1st of 6 teams	(Germany) Alba Berlin	(France) ASVEL	(Greece) Panathinaikos	(Spain) FC Barcelona
1999–00	Ülker	4th of 6 teams	4th of 6 teams	(Spain) FC Barcelona			
2000–01	Efes Pilsen		2nd of 10 teams	(Lithuania) Lietuvos rytas	(Croatia) Split CO	(Greece) Panathinaikos	(Russia) CSKA Moscow
2000–01	Ülker		4th of 10 teams	(Italy) Scavolini Pesaro			
2001–02	Ülker		4th of 8 teams	4th of 4 teams			
2001–02	Efes Pilsen		4th of 8 teams	2nd of 4 teams			
2002–03	Efes Pilsen		3rd of 8 teams	2nd of 4 teams			
2002–03	Ülker		2nd of 8 teams	4th of 4 teams			
2003–04	Efes Pilsen		1st of 8 teams	2nd of 4 teams			
2003–04	Ülker		3rd of 8 teams	4th of 4 teams			
2004–05	Efes Pilsen		2nd of 8 teams	2nd of 4 teams	(Greece) Panathinaikos		
2004–05	Ülker		4th of 8 teams	2nd of 4 teams	(Russia) CSKA Moscow		
2005–06	Efes Pilsen		2nd of 8 teams	2nd of 4 teams	(Russia) CSKA Moscow		
2005–06	Ülker		5th of 8 teams	4th of 4 teams			
2006–07	Fenerbahçe Ülker		7th of 8 teams				
2006–07	Efes Pilsen		4th of 8 teams	3rd of 4 teams			
2007–08	Fenerbahçe Ülker		4th of 8 teams	2nd of 4 teams	(Italy) Montepaschi Siena		
2007–08	Efes Pilsen		4th of 8 teams	4th of 4 teams			
2008–09	Fenerbahçe Ülker		3rd of 6 teams	4th of 4 teams			
2008–09	Efes Pilsen		5th of 6 teams				
2009–10	Efes Pilsen		4th of 6 teams	4th of 4 teams			
2009–10	Fenerbahçe Ülker		6th of 6 teams				
2010–11	Fenerbahçe Ülker		2nd of 6 teams	3rd of 4 teams			
2010–11	Efes Pilsen		3rd of 6 teams	3rd of 4 teams			
2011–12	Fenerbahçe Ülker		1st of 6 teams	4th of 4 teams			
2011–12	Galatasaray Medical Park	(Lithuania) Lietuvos rytas	4th of 6 teams	3rd of 4 teams			
2011–12	Anadolu Efes		3rd of 6 teams	4th of 4 teams			
2012–13	Beşiktaş		3rd of 6 teams	7th of 8 teams			
2012–13	Anadolu Efes		3rd of 6 teams	3rd of 8 teams	(Greece) Olympiacos		
2012–13	Fenerbahçe Ülker		4th of 6 teams	8th of 8 teams			
2013–14	Galatasaray Liv Hospital		2nd of 6 teams	4th of 8 teams	(Spain) FC Barcelona		
2013–14	Anadolu Efes		4th of 6 teams	8th of 8 teams			
2013–14	Fenerbahçe Ülker		1st of 6 teams	6th of 8 teams			
2014–15	Fenerbahçe Ülker		2nd of 6 teams	2nd of 8 teams	(Israel) Maccabi Tel Aviv	(Spain) Real Madrid	(Russia) CSKA Moscow (4th)
2014–15	Galatasaray Liv Hospital		4th of 6 teams	8th of 8 teams			
2014–15	Anadolu Efes		2nd of 6 teams	4th of 8 teams	(Spain) Real Madrid		
2015–16	Pınar Karşıyaka		5th of 6 teams				
2015–16	Anadolu Efes		2nd of 6 teams	5th of 8 teams			
2015–16	Fenerbahçe		1st of 6 teams	1st of 8 teams	(Spain) Real Madrid	(Spain) Laboral Kutxa	(Russia) CSKA Moscow
2015–16	Darüşşafaka Doğuş		4th of 6 teams	6th of 8 teams			
2016–17	Fenerbahçe			4th of 16 teams	(Greece) Panathinaikos Superfoods	(Spain) Real Madrid	(Greece) Olympiacos
2016–17	Anadolu Efes			6th of 16 teams	(Greece) Olympiacos		
2016–17	Galatasaray Odeabank			12th of 16 teams			
2016–17	Darüşşafaka Doğuş			8th of 16 teams	(Spain) Real Madrid		
2017–18	Fenerbahçe Doğuş			2nd of 16 teams	(Spain) Kirolbet Baskonia	(Lithuania) Žalgiris	(Spain) Real Madrid
2017–18	Anadolu Efes			16th of 16 teams			
2018–19	Fenerbahçe Beko			1st of 16 teams	(Lithuania) BC Žalgiris	(Turkey) Anadolu Efes	(Spain) Real Madrid Baloncesto (4th)
2018–19	Anadolu Efes			4th of 16 teams	(Spain) FC Barcelona	(Turkey) Fenerbahçe Beko	(Russia) CSKA Moscow
2018–19	Darüşşafaka Tekfen			16th of 16 teams			
2019–20	Fenerbahçe Beko			8th of 18 teams			
2019–20	Anadolu Efes			1st of 18 teams			
2020–21	Anadolu Efes			3rd of 18 teams	(Spain) Real Madrid	(Russia) CSKA Moscow	(Spain) FC Barcelona
2020–21	Fenerbahçe Beko			7th of 18 teams	(Russia) CSKA Moscow		
2021–22	Anadolu Efes			6th of 15 teams	(Italy) AX Armani Exchange Milan	(Greece) Olympiacos B.C.	(Spain) Real Madrid
2021–22	Fenerbahçe Beko			12th of 15 teams			

== Turkish clubs in FIBA Saporta Cup (2nd tier) ==
=== Season to season ===
Year	Team	_______ Earlier stage _______	___________ Last 48 ___________	________ Last 24 to 32 ________	________ Last 12 to 16 ________	_________ Last 6 to 8 _________	_________ Semifinals _________	____________ Final ____________
1966–67	İTÜ				(Socialist Federal Republic of Yugoslavia) Partizan			
1967–68	Fenerbahçe				(France) ASVEL			
1968–69	Altinordu			(Socialist Federal Republic of Yugoslavia) AŠK Olimpija				
1969–70	İTÜ				(Socialist Federal Republic of Yugoslavia) Lokomotiva			
1970–71	Galatasaray			(Romania) Steaua București				
1971–72	Beşiktaş			(Greece) AEK				
1972–73	Galatasaray		(Albania) Vllaznia	(Poland) Śląsk Wrocław				
1973–74	TED Ankara Kolejliler			(Israel) Beitar Jerusalem	(Italy) Saclà Asti			
1974–75	Şekerspor			(Hungary) Honvéd				
1975–76	Galatasaray				(England) Sutton & Crystal Palace			
1976–77	Beşiktaş			(Switzerland) Fribourg Olympic	(Romania) Steaua București			
1977–78	Beşiktaş			(Bulgaria) Levski-Spartak				
1978–79	Tofaş			(Socialist Federal Republic of Yugoslavia) Radnički Belgrade				
1979–80	Eczacıbaşı			(Romania) Steaua București	(Belgium) Sunair Oostende	4th of 4 teams		
1980–81	Efes Pilsen				(Bulgaria) Levski-Spartak	4th of 4 teams		
1981–82	Beşiktaş			(Romania) Dinamo București				
1982–83	Beşiktaş			(Hungary) Soproni MAFC				
1983–84	Fenerbahçe			(Romania) Steaua București				
1984–85	Karşıyaka			(Bulgaria) Spartak Pleven				
1985–86	Fenerbahçe			(Czechoslovakia) Chemosvit				
1986–87	Efes Pilsen			(Switzerland) Champel Genève	(Bulgaria) Balkan Botevgrad	3rd of 4 teams		
1987–88	Galatasaray				(England) Polycell Kingston			
1988–89	Çukurova Üniversitesi			(Bulgaria) CSKA Sofia				
1989–90	Çukurova Üniversitesi			(Hungary) Honvéd	(Italy) Knorr Bologna			
1990–91	Paşabahçe				(Socialist Federal Republic of Yugoslavia) Crvena zvezda			
1991–92	Tofaş		(Italy) Glaxo Verona					
1991–92	Fenerbahçe			(Germany) Alba Berlin				
1992–93	Nasaş	(Belgium) Bobcat Gent	(Portugal) Ovarense					
1992–93	Efes Pilsen			(Romania) Dinamo București	1st of 6 teams	Bye	(Israel) Hapoel Galil Elyon	(Greece) Sato Aris
1993–94	Tofaş		(Bulgaria) CSKA Sofia	(Italy) Olitalia Siena	5th of 6 teams			
1994–95	Fenerbahçe		(Austria) UBC Sankt Pölten	(Sweden) Kärcher Hisings-Kärra	3rd of 6 teams			
1995–96	Galatasaray		(Slovakia) AŠK Inter Bratislava					
1996–97	Türk Telekom PTT		2nd of 6 teams	(Finland) Torpan Pojat	(Greece) Dexim Apollon Patras	(France) PSG Racing		
1996–97	Fenerbahçe		1st of 6 teams	(Slovenia) Bavaria Volltex	(Israel) Hapoel Jerusalem			
1997–98	Fenerbahçe		4th of 6 teams	(Spain) Festina Joventut				
1997–98	Tofaş		2nd of 6 teams	(Slovenia) Pivovarna Laško	(Lithuania) Žalgiris			
1998–99	Türk Telekom		2nd of 6 teams	(Slovenia) Kovinotehna Savinjska Polzela	(Federal Republic of Yugoslavia) Partizan			
1998–99	Tofaş		1st of 6 teams	(Germany) TBB Trier	(Germany) Ratiopharm Ulm	(Federal Republic of Yugoslavia) Budućnost		
1999–00	Fenerbahçe		5th of 6 teams					
1999–00	Darüşşafaka		1st of 6 teams	(Federal Republic of Yugoslavia) Radnički Belgrade	(Portugal) Porto			
2000–01	Beşiktaş			4th of 6 teams	(Spain) Pamesa Valencia			
2000–01	Pınar Karşıyaka			5th of 6 teams				
2001–02	Türk Telekom			3rd of 6 teams	(Greece) Panionios			
2001–02	Darüşşafaka			6th of 6 teams				

== Turkish clubs in FIBA Korać Cup (3rd tier) ==
=== Season to season ===
Year	Team	_______ Earlier stage _______	________ Last 64 to 48 ________	________ Last 24 to 32 ________	________ Last 12 to 16 ________	_________ Last 6 to 8 _________	_________ Semifinals _________	____________ Final ____________
1972
1973
1973–74
1974–75	Galatasaray		(Israel) Hapoel Gvat/Yagur					
1975–76	Karşıyaka			(Bulgaria) Cherno More Port Varna				
1976–77	Karşıyaka		(Italy) Canon Venezia					
1977–78	İTÜ			(Socialist Federal Republic of Yugoslavia) Bosna				
1977–78	Şekerspor			(Czechoslovakia) Inter Slovnaft				
1978–79	Karşıyaka		(West Germany) Wolfenbüttel					
1979–80	Karşıyaka		(Belgium) CEPF					
1979–80	Tofaş			(Belgium) Éveil Monceau	4th of 4 teams			
1979–80	Ziraat Fakültesi			(Socialist Federal Republic of Yugoslavia) Cibona				
1980–81	Beşiktaş			(Socialist Federal Republic of Yugoslavia) Zadar				
1980–81	İstanbul Bankası Yenişehir			(Israel) Hapoel Tel Aviv				
1980–81	Karşıyaka		(Hungary) Vasas					
1981–82	Efes Pilsen			(Belgium) Spa Verviers-Pepinster	4th of 4 teams			
1981–82	Karşıyaka		(Hungary) Vasas					
1982–83	Efes Pilsen		(Czechoslovakia) Nová huť Ostrava					
1982–83	Tofaş		(Socialist Federal Republic of Yugoslavia) Crvena zvezda					
1982–83	Galatasaray		(Hungary) ZTE					
1982–83	Karşıyaka		(Belgium) Maes Pils					
1983–84	Eczacıbaşı			(Socialist Federal Republic of Yugoslavia) Partizan	3rd of 4 teams			
1983–84	Beşiktaş		(Bulgaria) Spartak Pleven					
1983–84	İTÜ			(France) Tours				
1984–85	Fenerbahçe		(Hungary) ZTE	(Socialist Federal Republic of Yugoslavia) Borac Čačak	4th of 4 teams			
1984–85	İTÜ		(Bulgaria) Akademik Varna					
1985–86	Çukurova Üniversitesi		(Italy) Berloni Torino					
1985–86	Eczacıbaşı		(West Germany) Steiner Bayreuth					
1986–87	Çukurova Üniversitesi		(Hungary) Videoton					
1986–87	Karşıyaka		(Belgium) Renault Gent	(Socialist Federal Republic of Yugoslavia) Budućnost				
1987–88	Efes Pilsen			(France) Monaco				
1987–88	Beslen Makarna			(Socialist Federal Republic of Yugoslavia) Jugoplastika				
1987–88	Beşiktaş		(Bulgaria) Akademik Varna	(Socialist Federal Republic of Yugoslavia) Crvena zvezda				
1988–89	Galatasaray		(Switzerland) Nyon	(Spain) CAI Zaragoza				
1988–89	Efes Pilsen		(Austria) Regenerin Klagenfurt	(Socialist Federal Republic of Yugoslavia) Zadar				
1988–89	Fenerbahçe		(Socialist Federal Republic of Yugoslavia) Crvena zvezda					
1988–89	Tofaş		(Hungary) Szolnoki Honvéd	(Italy) Wiwa Vismara Cantù				
1989–90	Beslen Makarna		(West Germany) TTL Bamberg					
1989–90	Efes Pilsen		(Austria) WAT Wieden	(Switzerland) Bellinzona	1st of 4 teams	(Socialist Federal Republic of Yugoslavia) Bosna		
1989–90	Fenerbahçe		(Socialist Federal Republic of Yugoslavia) Bosna					
1989–90	Paşabahçe		(Hungary) Oroszlányi Bányász	(Greece) Iraklis Thessaloniki				
1990–91	Efes Pilsen		(Hungary) Tungsram	(France) Mulhouse				
1990–91	Fenerbahçe		(Belgium) Go Pass Verviers-Pepinster					
1990–91	Çukurova Üniversitesi		(Hungary) Honvéd					
1990–91	Tofaş		(Italy) Phonola Caserta					
1991–92	Paşabahçe		(Sweden) Alvik	(Italy) Shampoo Clear Cantù				
1991–92	TED Ankara Kolejliler		(Poland) Stal Bobrek Bytom	(Croatia) Zadar				
1991–92	Efes Pilsen		(Hungary) ZTE Heraklith	(Israel) Hapoel Jerusalem				
1991–92	Çukurova Üniversitesi		(Czechoslovakia) Baník Cígeľ Prievidza	(Italy) Benetton Treviso				
1992–93	Fenerbahçe	(Georgia (country)) Merani Tbilisi	(Romania) Politehnica Timișoara	(Israel) Maccabi Rishon LeZion	3rd of 4 teams			
1992–93	Çukurova Üniversitesi		(France) Olympique Antibes					
1992–93	TED Ankara Kolejliler		(Israel) Hapoel Jerusalem	(Croatia) Zagreb				
1992–93	Tofaş		(Spain) Grupo Libro Valladolid	(Belgium) Spirou Charleroi				
1993–94	Fenerbahçe		(Czech Republic) Sparta Praha	(Belgium) Kessel-Lo Leuven	3rd of 4 teams			
1993–94	TED Ankara Kolejliler	(North Macedonia) Nemetali Ogražden	(Belgium) Sunair Oostende	(Germany) Alba Berlin				
1993–94	Galatasaray	(Slovakia) Baník Cígeľ Prievidza	(Spain) NatWest Zaragoza					
1993–94	Ülker		(Russia) Avtodor Saratov	(Croatia) Zagreb				
1994–95	Ülker		(Belgium) Spirou Charleroi	(France) PSG Racing	2nd of 4 teams	(France) Pau-Orthez		
1994–95	PTT	(Ukraine) Shakhtar Donetsk	(Germany) Bramsche Osnabrück	(France) Pitch Cholet				
1994–95	Galatasaray		(Lithuania) Lavera	(Spain) TDK Manresa				
1994–95	Tofaş	(North Macedonia) Nemetali Strumica	(Sweden) Borås Basket	(Spain) Estudiantes Argentaria				
1995–96	Fenerbahçe		(Belgium) Racing Basket Antwerpen	(France) JDA Dijon	2nd of 4 teams	(Turkey) Efes Pilsen		
1995–96	Efes Pilsen		(Slovenia) Kovinotehna Savinjska Polzela	(Israel) Maccabi Rishon LeZion	1st of 4 teams	(Turkey) Fenerbahçe	(Italy) Teamsystem Bologna	(Italy) Stefanel Milano
1995–96	Tofaş	(Slovenia) Satex Maribor	(England) London Towers	(Spain) TDK Manresa				
1995–96	PTT		(Bulgaria) Ficosota Shumen	(Italy) Scavolini Pesaro				
1996–97	Tofaş		2nd of 4 teams	(Estonia) Kalev	(Croatia) Benston Zagreb	(Spain) Cáceres	(Poland) Mazowzanka	(Greece) Aris
1996–97	Galatasaray		3rd of 4 teams					
1996–97	Beşiktaş		2nd of 4 teams	(Greece) Aris				
1996–97	Meysu		1st of 4 teams	(Croatia) Telecomp Vinkovci	(Poland) Mazowzanka			
1997–98	Kombassan Konya		2nd of 4 teams	(France) SLUC Nancy	(Greece) Papagou Katselis	(Federal Republic of Yugoslavia) Crvena zvezda		
1997–98	Tuborg		3rd of 4 teams					
1997–98	Galatasaray		2nd of 4 teams	(Latvia) Ventspils				
1997–98	Darüşşafaka		1st of 4 teams	(Poland) Komfort Stargard Szczeciński	(Federal Republic of Yugoslavia) Crvena zvezda			
1998–99	Beşiktaş		1st of 4 teams	(Spain) Fórum Valladolid	(Bosnia and Herzegovina) Brotnjo	(Belgium) Sunair Oostende		
1998–99	Darüşşafaka		1st of 4 teams	(Lithuania) Neptūnas	(Spain) FC Barcelona			
1998–99	Galatasaray		1st of 3 teams	(Lithuania) Alita Alytus	(Belgium) Sunair Oostende			
1998–99	Tuborg		4th of 4 teams					
1999–00	Galatasaray		1st of 4 teams	(Switzerland) Vacallo Win	(Spain) Unicaja			
1999–00	Beşiktaş	(Bosnia and Herzegovina) Posušje	3rd of 4 teams					
1999–00	Türk Telekom		2nd of 4 teams	(Turkey) Pinar Karşıyaka	(Greece) Aris	(France) Limoges CSP		
1999–00	Pinar Karşıyaka	(Bulgaria) Yambolgaz 92	1st of 3 teams	(Turkey) Türk Telekom				
2000–01	Darüşşafaka		(Bosnia and Herzegovina) Feal Široki	1st of 4 teams	(Federal Republic of Yugoslavia) Hemofarm			
2000–01	Türk Telekom		(Croatia) Sava Osiguranje Rijeka	3rd of 4 teams				
2000–01	Galatasaray		(Bosnia and Herzegovina) Sloboda Dita					
2000–01	Fenerbahçe		(Bosnia and Herzegovina) Igokea	3rd of 4 teams	(Bulgaria) Levski Sofia	(Netherlands) Ricoh Astronauts		
2001–02	Fenerbahçe		(Russia) EvrAz					
2001–02	Beşiktaş		(Federal Republic of Yugoslavia) Zdravlje	4th of 4 teams				
2001–02	Büyük Kolej		(Bosnia and Herzegovina) Zenica Čelik	4th of 4 teams				

== See also ==
European basketball clubs in European and worldwide competitions from:

- Croatia
- Czechoslovakia
- France
- Greece
- Israel
- Italy
- Russia
- Spain
- USSR
- Yugoslavia

Turkish basketball clubs in European and worldwide competitions from:

- Anadolu Efes SK in European club competitions
