= Pero Dujmović =

Bosnian basketball player (born 1977)

Personal information
- Born: November 14, 1977 (age 49) Mostar, SFR Yugoslavia
- Listed height: 6 ft 6.5 in (1.99 m)

Career information
- Playing career: 1996–2009
- Position: Forward

Career history
- 1995–1996: Zrinjski Mostar
- 1996–2001: Zrinjevac
- 2001–2002: Hapoel Galil Elyon
- 2002–2003: Union Olimpija
- 2003: Fenerbahçe Ülker
- 2003–2004: Union Olimpija
- 2004–2006: Spirou Charleroi
- 2006: Cholet
- 2006–2008: Cedevita
- 2008–2009: Široki Eronet

Petar "Pero" Dujmović (born November 14, 1977, in Mostar, SFR Yugoslavia) is a Croatian basketball agent, businessman and former pro basketball player.

== Basketball career ==
Dujmović started playing at Zrinjski. In 1996 he moved to Zagreb team KK Zrinjevac. After five seasons he moved to Israel team Hapoel Galil Elyon, before in 2002 he signed with Euroleague team Union Olimpija. After one year with Olimpija, he signed with Fenerbahçe Ülker, but in November 2003 he moved back to Ljubljana. He also played for Charleoi, Cholet, Cedevita and HKK Široki. His career ended after an Achilles' heel injury.

== Post-basketball ==
In 2009 he established basketball agency Pepi Sport Agency, that covers players in Bosnia&Herzegovina, Croatia and Slovenia. He is also director of fashion shop Locker.
