= 2020–21 Israeli Basketball National League =

Israeli Basketball National League
- Season: 2020–21
- Dates: 17 November 2020 – 17 June 2021
- Games played: 254
- Teams: 15

Regular season
- Promoted: Hapoel Galil Elyon; Elitzur Netanya
- Relegated: Hapoel Acre/Mateh Asher; Elitzur Yavne; Maccabi Kiryat Motzkin

Finals
- Champions: Hapoel Galil Elyon
- Runners-up: Elitzur Netanya
- Semifinalists: Elitzur Eito Ashkelon; Hapoel Afula
- All statistics correct as of 17 June 2021.

The 2020–21 Israeli Basketball National League (or the Liga Leumit) is the 21st season of the Israeli Basketball National League.

== Teams ==
The following teams had changed divisions after the 2019–20 season:

=== To National League ===
Promoted from Liga Artzit

- Hapoel Acre/Mateh Asher
- Maccabi Ironi Ramat Gan

Relegated from Premier League

- Maccabi Ashdod

=== From National League ===
Promoted to Premier League

- Hapoel Haifa
- Bnei Herzliya

=== Venues and locations ===
League Map

Team	City	Arena	Capacity
A.S. Ramat HaSharon	Ramat HaSharon	Oranim Hall	900
Elitzur Eito Ashkelon	Ashkelon	Ashkelon Sports Arena	3,000
Elitzur Netanya	Netanya	Yeshurun Hall	1,000
Elitzur Yavne	Yavne	Ralf Klain Hall	600
Hapoel Acre/Mateh Asher	Acre and Mateh Asher Regional Council	Goshen Hall	750
Hapoel Afula	Afula	Nir Ha'emak Hall	1,000
Hapoel Galil Elyon	Upper Galilee and Kiryat Shmona	HaPais Kfar Blum	2,200
Hapoel Hevel Modi'in	Hevel Modi'in Regional Council	Nahshon Hall	370
Hapoel Ramat Gan Givatayim	Ramat Gan and Givatayim	Zisman Hall	1,400
Ironi Kiryat Ata	Kiryat Ata	Ramaz Hall	1,000
Maccabi Ironi Ramat Gan	Ramat Gan	Zisman Hall	1,400
Maccabi Ashdod	Ashdod	HaKiriya Arena	2,200
Maccabi Hod HaSharon	Hod HaSharon	Atidim Hall	400
Maccabi Kiryat Motzkin	Kiryat Motzkin	Goshen Hall	750
Maccabi Ra'anana	Ra'anana	Metro West	1,850

== Regular season ==
=== League table ===
Pos	Team	Pld	W	L	PF	PA	PD	Pts	Qualification or relegation
1	Elitzur Eito Ashkelon	28	22	6	2401	2181	+220	50	Advance to playoffs
2	Maccabi Ashdod	28	20	8	2380	2259	+121	48	Advance to playoffs
3	Hapoel Galil Elyon	28	17	11	2378	2197	+181	45	Advance to playoffs
4	Ironi Kiryat Ata	28	16	12	2358	2325	+33	44	Advance to playoffs
5	Elitzur Netanya	28	16	12	2278	2260	+18	44	Advance to playoffs
6	Hapoel Hevel Modi'in	28	16	12	2477	2447	+30	44	Advance to playoffs
7	Hapoel Afula	28	16	12	2412	2310	+102	44	Advance to playoffs
8	Maccabi Ironi Ramat Gan	28	15	13	2414	2395	+19	43	Advance to playoffs
9	A.S. Ramat HaSharon	28	14	14	2262	2220	+42	42	Advance to playouts
10	Hapoel Ramat Gan Givatayim	28	13	15	2377	2430	−53	41	Advance to playouts
11	Maccabi Hod HaSharon	28	11	17	2230	2387	−157	39	Advance to playouts
12	Maccabi Ra'anana	28	10	18	2285	2368	−83	38	Advance to playouts
13	Elitzur Yavne	28	9	19	2297	2436	−139	37	Advance to playouts
14	Hapoel Acre/Mateh Asher	28	8	20	2431	2561	−130	36	Advance to playouts
15	Maccabi Kiryat Motzkin	28	7	21	2345	2549	−204	35	Advance to playouts

==== Rounds 1 to 30 ====
Home \ Away	EAS	MAS	HGE	IKA	ENE	HHM	HAF	IRG	ARH	HRG	MHH	MRA	EYA	HAA	MKM
Elitzur Eito Ashkelon		73–74	86–78	105–91	85–66	87–74	82–85	93–82	62–81	109–80	98–81	90–75	79–72	95–84	99–78
Maccabi Ashdod	72–89		89–78	105–78	94–81	80–61	76–70	86–94	86–78	89–72	70–74	82–72	89–81	87–78	104–84
Hapoel Galil Elyon	70–72	92–74		78–66	88–65	77–72	101–84	85–92	80–78	77–81	70–79	88–83	106–82	86–67	96–80
Ironi Kiryat Ata	78–88	82–90	79–100		93–83	86–78	85–79	87–67	94–67	101–93	99–77	84–67	90–69	97–101	85–81
Elitzur Netanya	88–69	90–63	76–67	97–79		84–86	81–73	85–78	59–73	85–94	74–72	78–75	69–65	102–91	81–88
Hapoel Hevel Modi'in	92–88	79–95	87–84	88–91	94–95		77–116	119–112	88–84	103–89	74–67	84–74	90–106	85–73	100–101
Hapoel Afula	75–78	94–89	72–74	71–73	82–90	85–105		106–73	91–83	95–92	89–69	95–93	94–86	97–100	79–93
Maccabi Ironi Ramat Gan	68–87	92–98	92–110	84–81	72–71	84–96	76–80		70–66	84–79	72–75	94–71	101–86	95–86	95–81
A.S. Ramat HaSharon	77–90	73–83	81–76	82–72	87–58	87–84	70–71	94–71		87–92	82–70	87–79	80–72	92–77	87–96
Hapoel Ramat Gan Givatayim	75–92	100–95	87–82	84–70	76–81	75–93	69–79	80–84	76–70		78–82	92–78	85–89	100–95	90–80
Maccabi Hod HaSharon	70–87	86–76	64–95	75–78	78–75	88–96	75–82	96–91	78–83	80–98		84–96	76–77	94–108	92–84
Maccabi Ra'anana	73–74	70–76	69–86	77–64	82–77	82–78	80–76	77–95	90–66	76–79	108–110		90–75	86–112	92–81
Elitzur Yavne	70–81	89–96	73–79	63–73	86–99	84–93	80–99	73–104	81–78	109–103	104–74	73–74		79–90	93–86
Hapoel Acre/Mateh Asher	72–80	75–83	101–98	89–96	96–99	99–109	84–100	75–92	84–89	77–88	71–83	97–110	68–85		100–89
Maccabi Kiryat Motzkin	100–83	74–79	66–77	87–106	74–89	74–92	76–94	72–100	90–102	97–84	83–88	91–84	90–95	69–83	

Legend: Blue = home team win; Red = away team win.

== Non-playoff teams ==
Pos	Team	Pld	W	L	PF	PA	PD	Pts	Qualification or relegation	ARH	HRG	MRA	MHH	HAA	EYA	MKM
9	A.S. Ramat HaSharon	34	18	16	2802	2696	+106	52			90–77	88–66		86–94		
10	Hapoel Ramat Gan Givatayim	34	15	19	2849	2944	−95	49					82–68		81–76	90–92
11	Maccabi Ra'anana	34	15	19	2812	2821	−9	49			87–75				87–67	115–87
12	Maccabi Hod HaSharon	34	14	20	2697	2865	−168	48		82–81		56–83		82–86		
13	Hapoel Acre/Mateh Asher	34	13	21	3025	3092	−67	47	Relegation to Liga Artzit		101–67	80–89				141–119
14	Elitzur Yavne	34	10	24	2785	2984	−199	44	Relegation to Liga Artzit	82–102			71–101	88–92		
15	Maccabi Kiryat Motzkin	34	8	26	2878	3170	−292	42	Relegation to Liga Artzit	75–93			75–78		85–104	

== Playoffs ==
Quarterfinals
1	Elitzur Eito Ashkelon	89	63	89	2
8	Maccabi Ironi Ramat Gan	77	66	85	1
4	Ironi Kiryat Ata	85	55	84	1
5	Elitzur Netanya	76	83	85	2
3	Hapoel Galil Elyon	96	82	84	2
6	Hapoel Hevel Modi'in	88	86	75	1
2	Maccabi Ashdod	62	83	79	1
7	Hapoel Afula	69	81	81	2

Semifinals
1	Elitzur Eito Ashkelon	72	74	87	56	75	2
5	Elitzur Netanya	70	62	88	65	83	3
3	Hapoel Galil Elyon	74	73	72	70	88	3
7	Hapoel Afula	73	92	70	87	84	2

Finals
3	Hapoel Galil Elyon	92
5	Elitzur Netanya	80
