= Anadolu Efes SK in European club competitions =

== 1979-80 Champions Cup ==
Group Matches: (finished bottom of Group D with 1-5)

1. (11.10.1979) Maccabi Tel Aviv - Efes Pilsen: 100 - 53 (L)
2. (18.10.1979) Efes Pilsen - Aris Thessaloniki: 66 - 63 (W)
3. (01.11.1979) Dinamo Bucharest - Efes Pilsen: 102 - 63 (L)
4. (08.11.1979) Efes Pilsen - Maccabi Tel Aviv: 56 - 96 (L)
5. (22.11.1979) Aris Thessaloniki - Efes Pilsen: 112 - 87 (L)
6. (29.11.1979) Efes Pilsen - Dinamo Bucharest: 73 - 91 (L)

== 1980-81 Cup Winners' Cup ==
Preliminary Round:

1. (04.11.1980) Levski Spartak Sofia - Efes Pilsen: 73 - 66 (L)
2. (11.11.1980) Efes Pilsen - Levski Spartak Sofia: 91 - 82 (W)

Group Matches: (finished bottom of Group A with 0-6)

1. (09.12.1980) FC Barcelona - Efes Pilsen: 104 - 66 (L)
2. (17.12.1980) Efes Pilsen - Turisanda Varese: 74 - 84 (L)
3. (14.01.1981) Efes Pilsen - Parker Leiden: 86 - 90 (L)
4. (20.01.1981) Efes Pilsen - FC Barcelona: 66 - 100 (L)
5. (28.01.1981) Turisanda Varese - Efes Pilsen: 88 - 69 (L)
6. (04.02.1981) Parker Leiden - Efes Pilsen: 91 - 72 (L)

== 1981-82 Korać Cup ==
Preliminary Round:

1. (03.11.1981) Spa Verviers Pepinster - Efes Pilsen: 91 - 90 (L)
2. (11.11.1981) Efes Pilsen - Spa Verviers Pepinster: 92 - 87 (W)

Group Matches: (finished bottom of Group D with 2-4)

1. (16.12.1981) Fortitudo Latte Sole Bologna - Efes Pilsen: 89 - 84 (L)
2. (29.12.1981) Efes Pilsen - Crvena Zvezda Belgrade: 81 - 90 (L)
3. (12.01.1982) ASPO Tours - Efes Pilsen: 94 - 75 (L)
4. (21.01.1982) Crvena Zvezda Belgrade - Efes Pilsen: 103 - 82 (L)
5. (27.01.1982) Efes Pilsen - Fortitudo Latte Sole Bologna: 99 - 92 (W)
6. (02.02.1982) Efes Pilsen - ASPO Tours: 90 - 87 (W)

== 1982-83 Korać Cup ==
Preliminary Round:

1. (06.10.1982) Efes Pilsen - Nova Hut Ostrava: 83 - 80 (W)
2. (13.10.1982) Nova Hut Ostrava - Efes Pilsen: 76 - 66 (L)

== 1983-84 Champions Cup ==
Preliminary Round:

1. (29.09.1983) Efes Pilsen - FC Barcelona: 96 - 111 (L)
2. (06.10.1983) FC Barcelona - Efes Pilsen: 100 - 87 (L)

== 1984-85 Champions Cup ==
First Preliminary Round:

1. (04.10.1984) Efes Pilsen - Ruda Hvezda Pardubice: 80 - 62 (W)
2. (11.10.1984) Ruda Hvezda Pardubice - Efes Pilsen: 72 - 77 (W)

Second Preliminary Round:

1. (01.11.1984) Efes Pilsen - Virtus Banco di Roma: 75 - 73 (W)
2. (08.11.1984) Virtus Banco di Roma - Efes Pilsen: 90 - 55 (L)

== 1986-87 Cup Winners' Cup ==
First Preliminary Round:

1. (30.09.1986) Efes Pilsen - Champel Geneve Basket: 91 - 75 (W)
2. (07.10.1986) Champel Geneve Basket - Efes Pilsen: 72 - 88 (W)

Second Preliminary Round:

1. (28.10.1986) Balkan Botevgrad - Efes Pilsen: 85 - 77 (L)
2. (06.11.1986) Efes Pilsen - Balkan Botevgrad: 76 - 61 (W)

Group Matches: (finished 3rd in Group B with 2-4)

1. (02.12.1986) Maes Pils Mechelen - Efes Pilsen: 111 - 90 (L)
2. (09.12.1986) Efes Pilsen - Scavolini Pesaro: 87 - 64 (W)
3. (06.01.1987) Efes Pilsen - Cibona Zagreb: 70 - 86 (L)
4. (13.01.1987) Efes Pilsen - Maes Pils Mechelen: 89 - 63 (W)
5. (20.01.1987) Scavolini Pesaro - Efes Pilsen: 103 - 66 (L)
6. (27.01.1987) Cibona Zagreb - Efes Pilsen: 125 - 78 (L)

== 1987-88 Korać Cup ==
Preliminary Round:

1. (14.10.1987) Efes Pilsen - AS Monaco Basket: 69 - 67 (W)
2. (21.10.1987) AS Monaco Basket - Efes Pilsen: 59 - 54 (L)

== 1988-89 Korać Cup ==
First Preliminary Round:

1. (12.10.1988) Regenerin Klagenfurt - Efes Pilsen: 96 - 130 (W)
2. (19.10.1988) Efes Pilsen - Regenerin Klagenfurt: 101 - 49 (W)

Second Preliminary Round:

1. (02.11.1988) Efes Pilsen - KK Zadar: 84 - 123 (L)
2. (06.11.1988) KK Zadar - Efes Pilsen: 85 - 96 (W)

== 1989-90 Korać Cup ==
First Preliminary Round:

1. (27.09.1989) WAT Wieden Vienna - Efes Pilsen: 66 - 80 (W)
2. (04.10.1989) Efes Pilsen - WAT Wieden Vienna: 111 - 47 (W)

Second Preliminary Round:

1. (25.10.1989) Efes Pilsen - Bellinzona Basket: 103 - 75 (W)
2. (01.11.1989) Bellinzona Basket - Efes Pilsen: 81 - 79 (L)

Group Matches: (finished 1st in Group B with 4-2)

1. (06.12.1989) Efes Pilsen - SKA Alma Ata: 77 - 71 (W)
2. (13.12.1989) Efes Pilsen - Hapoel Holon: 81 - 79 (W)
3. (17.01.1990) Panionios Athens - Efes Pilsen: 93 - 95 (W)
4. (24.01.1990) SKA Alma Ata - Efes Pilsen: 100 - 98 (L) (after overtime)
5. (31.01.1990) Hapoel Holon - Efes Pilsen: 97 - 95 (L)
6. (07.02.1990) Efes Pilsen - Panionios Athens: 94 - 84 (W)

Quarterfinal:

1. (21.02.1990) Efes Pilsen - Bosna Sarajevo: 91 - 107 (L)
2. (28.02.1990) Bosna Sarajevo - Efes Pilsen: 117 - 78 (L)

== 1990-91 Korać Cup ==
First Preliminary Round:

1. (26.09.1990) Tungsram Budapest - Efes Pilsen: 70 - 90 (W)
2. (03.10.1990) Efes Pilsen - Tungsram Budapest: 97 - 77 (W)

Second Preliminary Round:

1. (24.10.1990) Mulhouse Basket - Efes Pilsen: 87 - 70 (L)
2. (31.10.1990) Efes Pilsen - Mulhouse Basket: 96 - 87 (W)

== 1991-92 Korać Cup ==
First Preliminary Round:

1. (02.10.1991) ZTE Heraklith Zalaegerszeg - Efes Pilsen: 73 - 112 (W)
2. (09.10.1991) Efes Pilsen - ZTE Heraklith Zalaegerszeg: 99 - 88 (W)

Second Preliminary Round:

1. (30.10.1991) Hapoel Jerusalem - Efes Pilsen: 99 - 78 (L)
2. (06.11.1991) Efes Pilsen - Hapoel Jerusalem: 103 - 96 (W)

== 1992-93 European League & European Cup ==
EUROPEAN LEAGUE

First Preliminary Round:

1. (10.09.1992) Efes Pilsen - Sisley Fribourg: 91 - 59 (W)
2. (17.09.1992) Sisley Fribourg - Efes Pilsen: 64 - 83 (W)

Second Preliminary Round:

1. (01.10.1992) Efes Pilsen - EB Pau Orthez: 65 - 67 (L)
2. (08.10.1992) EB Pau Orthez - Efes Pilsen: 64 - 55 (L)

EUROPEAN CUP

Preliminary Round:

1. (27.10.1992) Efes Pilsen - Dinamo Bucharest: 96 - 54 (W)
2. (03.11.1992) Dinamo Bucharest - Efes Pilsen: 64 - 81 (W)

Group Matches: (finished 1st in Group A with 9-1)

1. (24.11.1992) Efes Pilsen - Smelt Olimpija Ljubljana: 69 - 52 (W)
2. (01.12.1992) Broceni Riga - Efes Pilsen: 72 - 93 (W)
3. (08.12.1992) NatWest Zaragoza - Efes Pilsen: 63 - 65 (W)
4. (15.12.1992) Efes Pilsen - CSKA Moscow: 85 - 82 (W)
5. (05.01.1993) Hapoel Tel Aviv - Efes Pilsen: 87 - 90 (W)
6. (12.01.1993) Smelt Olimpija Ljubljana - Efes Pilsen: 77 - 75 (L)
7. (19.01.1993) Efes Pilsen - Broceni Riga: 89 - 72 (W)
8. (26.01.1993) Efes Pilsen - NatWest Zaragoza: 50 - 49 (W)
9. (02.02.1993) CSKA Moscow - Efes Pilsen: 87 - 96 (W)
10. (09.02.1993) Efes Pilsen - Hapoel Tel Aviv: 75 - 66 (W)

Semifinal:

1. (18.02.1993) Hapoel Galil Elyon - Efes Pilsen: 71 - 73 (W)
2. (23.02.1993) Efes Pilsen - Hapoel Galil Elyon: 65 - 62 (W)

Final: (in Turin, Italy)

1. (16.03.1993) Aris Thessaloniki - Efes Pilsen: 50 - 48 (L)

== 1993-94 European League ==
Preliminary Round:

1. (30.09.1993) Žalgiris Kaunas - Efes Pilsen: 60 - 77 (W)
2. (07.10.1993) Efes Pilsen - Žalgiris Kaunas: 57 - 72 (L)

Group Matches: (finished 1st in Group B with 10-4)

1. (28.10.1993) Efes Pilsen - EB Pau Orthez: 81 - 74 (W)
2. (04.11.1993) Benfica Lisboa - Efes Pilsen: 61 - 77 (W)
3. (25.11.1993) Panathinaikos Athens - Efes Pilsen: 67 - 82 (W)
4. (02.12.1993) Efes Pilsen - Clear Cantù: 88 - 70 (W)
5. (09.12.1993) Virtus Buckler Bologna - Efes Pilsen: 85 - 65 (L)
6. (16.12.1993) Efes Pilsen - Cibona Zagreb: 69 - 75 (L) (after overtime)
7. (06.01.1994) Efes Pilsen - Joventut Badalona: 76 - 74 (W) (after overtime)
8. (13.01.1994) EB Pau Orthez - Efes Pilsen: 56 - 68 (W)
9. (20.01.1994) Efes Pilsen - Benfica Lisboa: 80 - 67 (W)
10. (27.01.1994) Efes Pilsen - Panathinaikos Athens: 68 - 59 (W)
11. (03.02.1994) Clear Cantù - Efes Pilsen: 54 - 58 (W)
12. (10.02.1994) Efes Pilsen - Virtus Buckler Bologna: 83 - 77 (W)
13. (17.02.1994) Cibona Zagreb - Efes Pilsen: 72 - 57 (L)
14. (24.02.1994) Joventut Badalona - Efes Pilsen: 66 - 53 (L)

Quarterfinal:

1. (10.03.1994) FC Barcelona - Efes Pilsen: 54 - 50 (L)
2. (15.03.1994) Efes Pilsen - FC Barcelona: 73 - 64 (W)
3. (17.03.1994) Efes Pilsen - FC Barcelona: 62 - 76 (L)

== 1994-95 European League ==
Preliminary Round:

1. (29.09.1994) Karcher Hisings Karra - Efes Pilsen: 81 - 85 (W)
2. (06.10.1994) Efes Pilsen - Karcher Hisings Karra: 88 - 63 (W)

Group Matches: (finished 6th in Group B with 8-6)

1. (27.10.1994) Efes Pilsen - Olympiacos Piraeus: 42 - 77 (L)
2. (03.11.1994) Joventut Badalona - Efes Pilsen: 70 - 84 (W)
3. (24.11.1994) TSV Bayer 04 Leverkusen - Efes Pilsen: 58 - 68 (W)
4. (01.12.1994) CSP Limoges - Efes Pilsen: 76 - 57 (L)
5. (08.12.1994) Efes Pilsen - Virtus Buckler Bologna: 54 - 48 (W)
6. (15.12.1994) FC Barcelona - Efes Pilsen: 61 - 53 (L)
7. (05.01.1995) Efes Pilsen - Cibona Zagreb: 67 - 62 (W)
8. (12.01.1995) Olympiacos Piraeus - Efes Pilsen: 56 - 79 (W)
9. (19.01.1995) Efes Pilsen - Joventut Badalona: 61 - 46 (W)
10. (26.01.1995) Efes Pilsen - TSV Bayer 04 Leverkusen: 77 - 66 (W)
11. (02.02.1995) Efes Pilsen - CSP Limoges: 64 - 69 (L)
12. (09.02.1995) Virtus Buckler Bologna - Efes Pilsen: 68 - 54 (L)
13. (16.02.1995) Efes Pilsen - FC Barcelona: 81 - 76 (W)
14. (23.02.1995) Cibona Zagreb - Efes Pilsen: 79 - 59 (L)

== 1995-96 Korać Cup ==
First Preliminary Round:

1. (27.09.1995) Kovinotehna Savinjska Polzela - Efes Pilsen: 66 - 76 (W)
2. (04.10.1995) Efes Pilsen - Kovinotehna Savinjska Polzela: 68 - 52 (W)

Second Preliminary Round:

1. (25.10.1995) Maccabi Rishon LeZion - Efes Pilsen: 59 - 79 (W)
2. (01.11.1995) Efes Pilsen - Maccabi Rishon LeZion: 82 - 59 (W)

Group Matches: (finished 1st in Group B with 5-1)

1. (22.11.1995) Efes Pilsen - Cagiva Varese: 80 - 60 (W)
2. (29.11.1995) Efes Pilsen - Panionios Athens: 68 - 66 (W)
3. (06.12.1995) Festina Andorra - Efes Pilsen: 63 - 72 (W)
4. (13.12.1995) Cagiva Varese - Efes Pilsen: 80 - 56 (L)
5. (19.12.1995) Panionios Athens - Efes Pilsen: 68 - 75 (W)
6. (03.01.1996) Efes Pilsen - Festina Andorra: 78 - 52 (W)

Quarterfinal:

1. (17.01.1996) Fenerbahçe Istanbul - Efes Pilsen: 68 - 95 (W)
2. (24.01.1996) Efes Pilsen - Fenerbahçe Istanbul: 56 - 74 (L)

Semifinal:

1. (07.02.1996) Efes Pilsen - Fortitudo Teamsystem Bologna: 102 - 78 (W)
2. (14.02.1996) Fortitudo Teamsystem Bologna - Efes Pilsen: 97 - 91 (L)

Final:

1. (06.03.1996) Efes Pilsen - Olimpia Stefanel Milano: 76 - 68 (W)
2. (13.03.1996) Olimpia Stefanel Milano - Efes Pilsen: 77 - 70 (L)

== 1996-97 Euroleague ==
Group Matches: (finished 1st in Group H with 12-4)

1. (20.09.1996) Efes Pilsen - Virtus Kinder Bologna: 75 - 60 (W)
2. (27.09.1996) Partizan Belgrade - Efes Pilsen: 76 - 72 (L)
3. (04.10.1996) Efes Pilsen - Dynamo Moscow: 87 - 84 (W)
4. (10.10.1996) EB Pau Orthez - Efes Pilsen: 80 - 78 (L)
5. (17.10.1996) Efes Pilsen - Caja San Fernando Sevilla: 69 - 66 (W)
6. (07.11.1996) Virtus Kinder Bologna - Efes Pilsen: 75 - 89 (W)
7. (14.11.1996) Efes Pilsen - Partizan Belgrade: 93 - 77 (W)
8. (21.11.1996) Dynamo Moscow - Efes Pilsen: 73 - 82 (W)
9. (05.12.1996) Efes Pilsen - EB Pau Orthez: 78 - 76 (W) (after overtime)
10. (12.12.1996) Caja San Fernando Sevilla - Efes Pilsen: 68 - 70 (W)
11. (08.01.1997) TSV Bayer 04 Leverkusen - Efes Pilsen: 72 - 73 (W)
12. (15.01.1997) Efes Pilsen - Croatia Osiguranje Split: 74 - 64 (W)
13. (22.01.1997) FC Barcelona - Efes Pilsen: 69 - 67 (L)
14. (05.02.1997) Efes Pilsen - TSV Bayer 04 Leverkusen: 91 - 68 (W)
15. (12.02.1997) Croatia Osiguranje Split - Efes Pilsen: 78 - 56 (L)
16. (19.02.1997) Efes Pilsen - FC Barcelona: 96 - 70 (W)

1/8 Final:

1. (06.03.1997) Efes Pilsen - Maccabi Tel Aviv: 76 - 67 (W)
2. (11.03.1997) Maccabi Tel Aviv - Efes Pilsen: 78 - 65 (L)
3. (13.03.1997) Efes Pilsen - Maccabi Tel Aviv: 84 - 69 (W)

Quarterfinal:

1. (27.03.1997) Efes Pilsen - ASVEL Villeurbanne: 87 - 71 (W)
2. (01.04.1997) ASVEL Villeurbanne - Efes Pilsen: 80 - 70 (L)
3. (03.04.1997) Efes Pilsen - ASVEL Villeurbanne: 57 - 62 (L)

== 1997-98 Euroleague ==
Group Matches: (finished 2nd in Group E with 12-4)

1. (18.09.1997) Efes Pilsen - Olympiacos Piraeus: 67 - 70 (L)
2. (25.09.1997) CSP Limoges - Efes Pilsen: 62 - 77 (W)
3. (02.10.1997) Real Madrid - Efes Pilsen: 66 - 76 (W)
4. (09.10.1997) Efes Pilsen - Maccabi Tel Aviv: 81 - 69 (W)
5. (23.10.1997) CSKA Moscow - Efes Pilsen: 77 - 73 (L)
6. (06.11.1997) Olympiacos Piraeus - Efes Pilsen: 61 - 60 (L)
7. (13.11.1997) Efes Pilsen - CSP Limoges: 65 - 64 (W)
8. (20.11.1997) Efes Pilsen - Real Madrid: 78 - 81 (L) (after overtime)
9. (11.12.1997) Maccabi Tel Aviv - Efes Pilsen: 61 - 70 (W)
10. (18.12.1997) Efes Pilsen - CSKA Moscow: 71 - 63 (W)
11. (08.01.1998) Croatia Osiguranje Split - Efes Pilsen: 82 - 93 (W)
12. (14.01.1998) Efes Pilsen - Turk Telekom Ankara: 74 - 68 (W)
13. (21.01.1998) FC Porto - Efes Pilsen: 67 - 98 (W)
14. (04.02.1998) Efes Pilsen - Croatia Osiguranje Split: 86 - 75 (W)
15. (12.02.1998) Turk Telekom Ankara - Efes Pilsen: 69 - 83 (W)
16. (18.02.1998) Efes Pilsen - FC Porto: 80 - 71 (W)

1/8 Final:

1. (04.03.1998) Efes Pilsen - Cibona Zagreb: 75 - 59 (W)
2. (06.03.1998) Cibona Zagreb - Efes Pilsen: 98 - 102 (W) (after 3 overtimes)

Quarterfinal:

1. (24.03.1998) Benetton Treviso - Efes Pilsen: 67 - 57 (L)
2. (26.03.1998) Efes Pilsen - Benetton Treviso: 59 - 58 (W)
3. (02.04.1998) Benetton Treviso - Efes Pilsen: 76 - 68 (L)

== 1998-99 Euroleague ==
Group Matches: (finished 2nd in Group F with 11-5)

1. (24.09.1998) TDK Manresa - Efes Pilsen: 67 - 68 (W)
2. (01.10.1998) Maccabi Tel Aviv - Efes Pilsen: 66 - 68 (W)
3. (08.10.1998) Efes Pilsen - Crvena Zvezda Belgrade: 73 - 60 (W)
4. (14.10.1998) Efes Pilsen - Cibona Zagreb: 80 - 57 (W)
5. (22.10.1998) Panathinaikos Athens - Efes Pilsen: 77 - 63 (L)
6. (05.11.1998) Efes Pilsen - TDK Manresa: 82 - 74 (W)
7. (12.11.1998) Efes Pilsen - Maccabi Tel Aviv: 81 - 74 (W)
8. (19.11.1998) Crvena Zvezda Belgrade - Efes Pilsen: 71 - 72 (W)
9. (09.12.1998) Cibona Zagreb - Efes Pilsen: 76 - 70 (L)
10. (16.12.1998) Efes Pilsen - Panathinaikos Athens: 53 - 80 (L)
11. (07.01.1999) Varese Roosters - Efes Pilsen: 67 - 57 (L)
12. (13.01.1999) Efes Pilsen - TAU Ceramica Vitoria: 71 - 67 (W)
13. (21.01.1999) Avtodor Saratov - Efes Pilsen: 66 - 77 (W)
14. (03.02.1999) Efes Pilsen - Varese Roosters: 83 - 72 (W)
15. (11.02.1999) TAU Ceramica Vitoria - Efes Pilsen: 83 - 61 (L)
16. (18.02.1999) Efes Pilsen - Avtodor Saratov: 107 - 91 (W)

1/8 Final:

1. (02.03.1999) Efes Pilsen - CSKA Moscow: 73 - 58 (W)
2. (04.03.1999) CSKA Moscow - Efes Pilsen: 98 - 105 (W) (after 2 overtimes)

Quarterfinal:

1. (23.03.1999) Žalgiris Kaunas - Efes Pilsen: 69 - 68 (L)
2. (25.03.1999) Efes Pilsen - Žalgiris Kaunas: 70 - 84 (L)

== 1999-00 Euroleague ==
Group Matches: (finished 1st in Group H with 11-5)

1. (23.09.1999) Caja San Fernando Sevilla - Efes Pilsen: 62 - 43 (L)
2. (29.09.1999) Fortitudo PAF Bologna - Efes Pilsen: 76 - 56 (L)
3. (06.10.1999) Efes Pilsen - Buducnost Podgorica: 73 - 67 (W)
4. (20.10.1999) Efes Pilsen - EB Pau Orthez: 69 - 65 (W)
5. (27.10.1999) Cibona Zagreb - Efes Pilsen: 71 - 69 (L)
6. (04.11.1999) Efes Pilsen - Caja San Fernando Sevilla: 73 - 57 (W)
7. (10.11.1999) Efes Pilsen - Fortitudo PAF Bologna: 99 - 63 (W)
8. (17.11.1999) Buducnost Podgorica - Efes Pilsen: 86 - 80 (L)
9. (08.12.1999) EB Pau Orthez - Efes Pilsen: 71 - 76 (W)
10. (15.12.1999) Efes Pilsen - Cibona Zagreb: 69 - 60 (W)
11. (05.01.2000) Pivovarna Lasko - Efes Pilsen: 79 - 91 (W)
12. (13.01.2000) Efes Pilsen - Varese Roosters: 84 - 74 (W)
13. (20.01.2000) Ulker Istanbul - Efes Pilsen: 93 - 87 (L)
14. (03.02.2000) Efes Pilsen - Pivovarna Lasko: 78 - 68 (W)
15. (09.02.2000) Varese Roosters - Efes Pilsen: 76 - 79 (W)
16. (17.02.2000) Efes Pilsen - Ulker Istanbul: 95 - 74 (W)

1/8 Final:

1. (29.02.2000) Efes Pilsen - Alba Berlin: 90 - 81 (W)
2. (03.03.2000) Alba Berlin - Efes Pilsen: 73 - 93 (W)

Quarterfinal:

1. (21.03.2000) Efes Pilsen - ASVEL Villeurbanne: 93 - 85 (W)
2. (23.03.2000) ASVEL Villeurbanne - Efes Pilsen: 77 - 60 (L)
3. (30.03.2000) Efes Pilsen - ASVEL Villeurbanne: 68 - 66 (W)

FINAL FOUR (in Thessaloniki, Greece)

Semifinal:

1. (18.04.2000) Panathinaikos Athens - Efes Pilsen: 81 - 71 (L)

Third-Place Game:

1. (20.04.2000) Efes Pilsen - FC Barcelona: 75 - 69 (W)

== 2000-01 Suproleague ==
Group Matches: (finished 2nd in Group B with 13-5)

1. (19.10.2000) Telindus Oostende - Efes Pilsen: 79 - 65 (L)
2. (26.10.2000) Krka Novo Mesto - Efes Pilsen: 64 - 72 (W)
3. (01.11.2000) Efes Pilsen - TSV Bayer 04 Leverkusen: 97 - 88 (W)
4. (09.11.2000) Maccabi Tel Aviv - Efes Pilsen: 69 - 59 (L)
5. (16.11.2000) Efes Pilsen - EB Pau Orthez: 88 - 76 (W)
6. (06.12.2000) Iraklis Thessaloniki - Efes Pilsen: 72 - 87 (W)
7. (20.12.2000) Scavolini Pesaro - Efes Pilsen: 82 - 80 (L)
8. (28.12.2000) Efes Pilsen - Partizan Belgrade: 93 - 82 (W)
9. (04.01.2001) Efes Pilsen - Plannja Luleå: 104 - 75 (W)
10. (10.01.2001) Efes Pilsen - Telindus Oostende: 89 - 80 (W)
11. (18.01.2001) Efes Pilsen - Krka Novo Mesto: 84 - 70 (W)
12. (31.01.2001) TSV Bayer 04 Leverkusen - Efes Pilsen: 69 - 71 (W)
13. (08.02.2001) Efes Pilsen - Maccabi Tel Aviv: 72 - 66 (W)
14. (15.02.2001) EB Pau Orthez - Efes Pilsen: 94 - 73 (L)
15. (21.02.2001) Efes Pilsen - Iraklis Thessaloniki: 88 - 65 (W)
16. (01.03.2001) Partizan Belgrade - Efes Pilsen: 79 - 68 (L)
17. (08.03.2001) Efes Pilsen - Scavolini Pesaro: 96 - 92 (W)
18. (15.03.2001) Plannja Luleå - Efes Pilsen: 84 - 92 (W)

1/8 Final:

1. (27.03.2001) Efes Pilsen - Lietuvos Rytas Vilnius: 89 - 78 (W)
2. (29.03.2001) Lietuvos Rytas Vilnius - Efes Pilsen: 73 - 69 (L)
3. (05.04.2001) Efes Pilsen - Lietuvos Rytas Vilnius: 86 - 67 (W)

Quarterfinal:

1. (17.04.2001) Efes Pilsen - Croatia Osiguranje Split: 95 - 69 (W)
2. (19.04.2001) Croatia Osiguranje Split - Efes Pilsen: 72 - 64 (L)
3. (26.04.2001) Efes Pilsen - Croatia Osiguranje Split: 82 - 59 (W)

FINAL FOUR (in Paris, France)

Semifinal:

1. (11.05.2001) Panathinaikos Athens - Efes Pilsen: 74 - 66 (L)

Third-Place Game:

1. (13.05.2001) Efes Pilsen - CSKA Moscow: 91 - 85 (W)

== 2001-02 Euroleague ==
Regular Season Group: (finished 4th in Group A with 9-5)

1. (10.10.2001) Olympiacos Piraeus - Efes Pilsen: 87 - 72 (L)
2. (17.10.2001) Efes Pilsen - Benetton Treviso: 87 - 78 (W)
3. (24.10.2001) Efes Pilsen - Alba Berlin: 78 - 72 (W)
4. (31.10.2001) Idea Śląsk Wrocław - Efes Pilsen: 74 - 79 (W)
5. (07.11.2001) Efes Pilsen - Unicaja Málaga: 75 - 71 (W)
6. (14.11.2001) Spirou Charleroi - Efes Pilsen: 79 - 75 (L)
7. (06.12.2001) Efes Pilsen - Maccabi Tel Aviv: 68 - 72 (L)
8. (12.12.2001) Efes Pilsen - Olympiacos Piraeus: 79 - 80 (L)
9. (19.12.2001) Benetton Treviso - Efes Pilsen: 88 - 86 (L)
10. (09.01.2002) Alba Berlin - Efes Pilsen: 73 - 74 (W)
11. (16.01.2002) Efes Pilsen - Idea Śląsk Wrocław: 63 - 51 (W)
12. (30.01.2002) Unicaja Málaga - Efes Pilsen: 66 - 67 (W)
13. (06.02.2002) Efes Pilsen - Spirou Charleroi: 78 - 65 (W)
14. (14.02.2002) Maccabi Tel Aviv - Efes Pilsen: 76 - 78 (W)

Top 16 Group: (finished 2nd in Group F with 3-3)

1. (28.02.2002) Efes Pilsen - Virtus Kinder Bologna: 73 - 76 (L)
2. (07.03.2002) Efes Pilsen - Real Madrid: 63 - 67 (L)
3. (20.03.2002) Ural Great Perm - Efes Pilsen: 85 - 89 (W)
4. (28.03.2002) Virtus Kinder Bologna - Efes Pilsen: 77 - 71 (L)
5. (04.04.2002) Efes Pilsen - Ural Great Perm: 101 - 84 (W)
6. (17.04.2002) Real Madrid - Efes Pilsen: 92 - 109 (W)

== 2002-03 Euroleague ==
Regular Season Group: (finished 3rd in Group A with 8-6)

1. (10.10.2002) Alba Berlin - Efes Pilsen: 63 - 84 (W)
2. (16.10.2002) Efes Pilsen - Benetton Treviso: 84 - 83 (W)
3. (24.10.2002) Cibona VIP Zagreb - Efes Pilsen: 64 - 56 (L)
4. (30.10.2002) Efes Pilsen - FC Barcelona: 91 - 92 (L) (after 2 overtimes)
5. (06.11.2002) Fortitudo Skipper Bologna - Efes Pilsen: 72 - 73 (W)
6. (14.11.2002) Efes Pilsen - AEK Athens: 74 - 79 (L)
7. (04.12.2002) EB Pau Orthez - Efes Pilsen: 74 - 85 (W)
8. (12.12.2002) Efes Pilsen - Alba Berlin: 74 - 62 (W)
9. (19.12.2002) Benetton Treviso - Efes Pilsen: 87 - 75 (L)
10. (08.01.2003) Efes Pilsen - Cibona VIP Zagreb: 91 - 57 (W)
11. (16.01.2003) FC Barcelona - Efes Pilsen: 73 - 60 (L)
12. (29.01.2003) Efes Pilsen - Fortitudo Skipper Bologna: 75 - 57 (W)
13. (06.02.2003) AEK Athens - Efes Pilsen: 64 - 81 (W)
14. (12.02.2003) Efes Pilsen - EB Pau Orthez: 69 - 71 (L)

Top 16 Group: (finished 2nd in Group D with 4-2)

1. (26.02.2003) Efes Pilsen - Cibona VIP Zagreb: 68 - 62 (W)
2. (05.03.2003) Unicaja Málaga - Efes Pilsen: 74 - 75 (W)
3. (19.03.2003) Efes Pilsen - CSKA Moscow: 71 - 69 (W)
4. (26.03.2003) Cibona VIP Zagreb - Efes Pilsen: 82 - 75 (L) (after overtime)
5. (09.04.2003) CSKA Moscow - Efes Pilsen: 66 - 54 (L)
6. (16.04.2003) Efes Pilsen - Unicaja Málaga: 82 - 78 (W)

== 2003-04 Euroleague ==
Regular Season Group: (finished 1st in Group C with 10-4)

1. (06.11.2003) TAU Ceramica Vitoria - Efes Pilsen: 83 - 87 (W)
2. (12.11.2003) Efes Pilsen - Adecco ASVEL Villeurbanne: 69 - 44 (W)
3. (19.11.2003) Efes Pilsen - Benetton Treviso: 78 - 89 (L)
4. (27.11.2003) Olympiacos Piraeus - Efes Pilsen: 57 - 69 (W)
5. (03.12.2003) Efes Pilsen - Alba Berlin: 79 - 68 (W)
6. (11.12.2003) Idea Śląsk Wrocław - Efes Pilsen: 76 - 69 (L)
7. (17.12.2003) Efes Pilsen - Pamesa Valencia: 69 - 59 (W)
8. (07.01.2004) Efes Pilsen - TAU Ceramica Vitoria: 74 - 65 (W)
9. (14.01.2004) Adecco ASVEL Villeurbanne - Efes Pilsen: 67 - 73 (W)
10. (21.01.2004) Benetton Treviso - Efes Pilsen: 66 - 79 (W)
11. (29.01.2004) Efes Pilsen - Olympiacos Piraeus: 61 - 52 (W)
12. (04.02.2004) Alba Berlin - Efes Pilsen: 77 - 61 (L)
13. (12.02.2004) Efes Pilsen - Idea Śląsk Wrocław: 95 - 92 (W)
14. (18.02.2004) Pamesa Valencia - Efes Pilsen: 107–103 (L) (after overtime)

Top 16 Group: (finished 2nd in Group E with 4-2)

1. (03.03.2004) EB Pau Orthez - Efes Pilsen: 57 - 77 (W)
2. (11.03.2004) Union Olimpija Ljubljana - Efes Pilsen: 68 - 57 (L)
3. (17.03.2004) Efes Pilsen - Fortitudo Skipper Bologna: 72 - 70 (W)
4. (24.03.2004) Efes Pilsen - EB Pau Orthez: 78 - 61 (W)
5. (31.03.2004) Fortitudo Skipper Bologna - Efes Pilsen: 76 - 75 (L)
6. (07.04.2004) Efes Pilsen - Union Olimpija Ljubljana: 68 - 58 (W)

== 2004-05 Euroleague ==
Regular Season Group: (finished 2nd in Group A with 12-2)

1. (04.11.2004) Efes Pilsen - Adecco Estudiantes Madrid: 81 - 72 (W)
2. (10.11.2004) Fortitudo Climamio Bologna - Efes Pilsen: 92 - 71 (L)
3. (18.11.2004) Efes Pilsen - Cibona VIP Zagreb: 72 - 70 (W)
4. (24.11.2004) Prokom Trefl Sopot - Efes Pilsen: 67 - 73 (W)
5. (02.12.2004) Efes Pilsen - Real Madrid: 74 - 70 (W)
6. (09.12.2004) Olympiacos Piraeus - Efes Pilsen: 59 - 110 (W)
7. (16.12.2004) Efes Pilsen - Partizan Pivara MB Belgrade: 78 - 63 (W)
8. (23.12.2004) Adecco Estudiantes Madrid - Efes Pilsen: 61 - 66 (W)
9. (06.01.2005) Efes Pilsen - Fortitudo Climamio Bologna: 79 - 73 (W)
10. (12.01.2005) Cibona VIP Zagreb - Efes Pilsen: 82 - 72 (L)
11. (20.01.2005) Efes Pilsen - Prokom Trefl Sopot: 78 - 65 (W)
12. (26.01.2005) Real Madrid - Efes Pilsen: 57 - 72 (W)
13. (02.02.2005) Efes Pilsen - Olympiacos Piraeus: 80 - 54 (W)
14. (10.02.2005) Partizan Pivara MB Belgrade - Efes Pilsen: 49 - 74 (W)

Top 16 Group: (finished 2nd in Group G with 4-2)

1. (23.02.2005) Efes Pilsen - Prokom Trefl Sopot: 86 - 62 (W)
2. (03.03.2005) AEK Athens - Efes Pilsen: 70 - 69 (L)
3. (10.03.2005) Efes Pilsen - Benetton Treviso: 52 - 43 (W)
4. (16.03.2005) Prokom Trefl Sopot - Efes Pilsen: 70 - 89 (W)
5. (24.03.2005) Benetton Treviso - Efes Pilsen: 70 - 59 (L)
6. (30.03.2005) Efes Pilsen - AEK Athens: 69 - 62 (W)

Quarterfinal:

1. (06.04.2005) Panathinaikos Athens - Efes Pilsen: 102 - 96 (L) (after overtime)
2. (08.04.2005) Efes Pilsen - Panathinaikos Athens: 75 - 63 (W)
3. (14.04.2005) Panathinaikos Athens - Efes Pilsen: 84 - 76 (L)

== 2005-06 Euroleague ==
Regular Season Group: (finished 2nd in Group B with 9-5)

1. (03.11.2005) Olimpia Armani Jeans Milano - Efes Pilsen: 66 - 71 (W)
2. (10.11.2005) Efes Pilsen - Winterthur FC Barcelona: 66 - 63 (W)
3. (17.11.2005) Olympiacos Piraeus - Efes Pilsen: 75 - 78 (W) (after overtime)
4. (24.11.2005) Efes Pilsen - Maccabi Tel Aviv: 90 - 88 (W)
5. (30.11.2005) Efes Pilsen - Lietuvos Rytas Vilnius: 51 - 72 (L)
6. (08.12.2005) Prokom Trefl Sopot - Efes Pilsen: 75 - 82 (W)
7. (14.12.2005) Efes Pilsen - Cibona VIP Zagreb: 71 - 77 (L)
8. (22.12.2005) Efes Pilsen - Olimpia Armani Jeans Milano: 85 - 57 (W)
9. (05.01.2006) Winterthur FC Barcelona - Efes Pilsen: 79 - 74 (L)
10. (11.01.2006) Efes Pilsen - Olympiacos Piraeus: 77 - 69 (W)
11. (19.01.2006) Maccabi Tel Aviv - Efes Pilsen: 88 - 81 (L)
12. (25.01.2006) Lietuvos Rytas Vilnius - Efes Pilsen: 65 - 74 (W)
13. (02.02.2006) Efes Pilsen - Prokom Trefl Sopot: 76 - 61 (W)
14. (09.02.2006) Cibona VIP Zagreb - Efes Pilsen: 60 - 49 (L)

Top 16 Group: (finished 2nd in Group G with 3-3)

1. (22.02.2006) Efes Pilsen - Benetton Treviso: 80 - 68 (W)
2. (01.03.2006) Efes Pilsen - Cibona VIP Zagreb: 63 - 69 (L)
3. (08.03.2006) Panathinaikos Athens - Efes Pilsen: 73 - 76 (W)
4. (15.03.2006) Benetton Treviso - Efes Pilsen: 94 - 87 (L)
5. (22.03.2006) Efes Pilsen - Panathinaikos Athens: 56 - 66 (L)
6. (29.03.2006) Cibona VIP Zagreb - Efes Pilsen: 77 - 84 (W)

Quarterfinal:

1. (04.04.2006) CSKA Moscow - Efes Pilsen: 66 - 57 (L)
2. (06.04.2006) Efes Pilsen - CSKA Moscow: 71 - 75 (L)

== 2006-07 Euroleague ==
Regular Season Group: (finished 4th in Group A with 8-6)

1. (26.10.2006) Efes Pilsen - Prokom Trefl Sopot: 71 - 67 (W)
2. (02.11.2006) RheinEnergie Cologne - Efes Pilsen: 68 - 82 (W)
3. (09.11.2006) Efes Pilsen - Le Mans Sarthe Basket: 53 - 64 (L)
4. (15.11.2006) TAU Ceramica Vitoria - Efes Pilsen: 68 - 65 (L)
5. (22.11.2006) Efes Pilsen - Olympiacos Piraeus: 95 - 77 (W)
6. (29.11.2006) Efes Pilsen - Fortitudo Climamio Bologna: 72 - 74 (L)
7. (07.12.2006) Dynamo Moscow - Efes Pilsen: 90 - 83 (L)
8. (14.12.2006) Prokom Trefl Sopot - Efes Pilsen: 74 - 81 (W)
9. (20.12.2006) Efes Pilsen - RheinEnergie Cologne: 91 - 76 (W)
10. (04.01.2007) Le Mans Sarthe Basket - Efes Pilsen: 67 - 71 (W)
11. (10.01.2007) Efes Pilsen - TAU Ceramica Vitoria: 78 - 84 (L)
12. (17.01.2007) Olympiacos Piraeus - Efes Pilsen: 72 - 91 (W)
13. (24.01.2007) Fortitudo Climamio Bologna - Efes Pilsen: 74 - 76 (W)
14. (01.02.2007) Efes Pilsen - Dynamo Moscow: 72 - 76 (L)

Top 16 Group: (finished 3rd in Group F with 2-4)

1. (15.02.2007) Panathinaikos Athens - Efes Pilsen: 84 - 57 (L)
2. (22.02.2007) Efes Pilsen - Prokom Trefl Sopot: 67 - 71 (L) (after overtime)
3. (01.03.2007) Winterthur FC Barcelona - Efes Pilsen: 82 - 73 (L)
4. (08.03.2007) Efes Pilsen - Panathinaikos Athens: 65 - 79 (L)
5. (14.03.2007) Efes Pilsen - Winterthur FC Barcelona: 82 - 78 (W)
6. (21.03.2007) Prokom Trefl Sopot - Efes Pilsen: 64 - 72 (W)

== 2007-08 Euroleague ==
Regular Season Group: (finished 4th in Group B with 8-6)

1. (24.10.2007) Cibona VIP Zagreb - Efes Pilsen: 93 - 85 (L)
2. (31.10.2007) Efes Pilsen - Olimpia Armani Jeans Milano: 80 - 70 (W)
3. (08.11.2007) Maccabi Tel Aviv - Efes Pilsen: 73 - 67 (L)
4. (15.11.2007) Efes Pilsen - Le Mans Sarthe Basket: 66 - 63 (W)
5. (21.11.2007) Lietuvos Rytas Vilnius - Efes Pilsen: 70 - 77 (W)
6. (28.11.2007) Aris TT Bank Thessaloniki - Efes Pilsen: 67 - 64 (L)
7. (05.12.2007) Efes Pilsen - Unicaja Málaga: 91 - 75 (W)
8. (12.12.2007) Efes Pilsen - Cibona VIP Zagreb: 100 - 74 (W)
9. (19.12.2007) Olimpia Armani Jeans Milano - Efes Pilsen: 73 - 76 (W)
10. (03.01.2008) Efes Pilsen - Maccabi Tel Aviv: 68 - 83 (L)
11. (10.01.2008) Le Mans Sarthe Basket - Efes Pilsen: 84 - 91 (W) (after overtime)
12. (16.01.2008) Efes Pilsen - Lietuvos Rytas Vilnius: 90 - 84 (W)
13. (23.01.2008) Efes Pilsen - Aris TT Bank Thessaloniki: 74 - 84 (L)
14. (31.01.2008) Unicaja Málaga - Efes Pilsen: 87 - 77 (L)

Top 16 Group: (finished bottom of Group D with 1-5)

1. (13.02.2008) Efes Pilsen - Panathinaikos Athens: 74 - 64 (W)
2. (20.02.2008) Efes Pilsen - Montepaschi Siena: 76 - 79 (L) (after overtime)
3. (28.02.2008) Partizan Igokea Belgrade - Efes Pilsen: 78 - 65 (L)
4. (06.03.2008) Panathinaikos Athens - Efes Pilsen: 74 - 65 (L)
5. (13.03.2008) Efes Pilsen - Partizan Igokea Belgrade: 79 - 83 (L)
6. (19.03.2008) Montepaschi Siena - Efes Pilsen: 80 - 67 (L)

== 2008-09 Euroleague ==
Regular Season Group: (finished 5th in Group D with 4-6)

1. (23.10.2008) Efes Pilsen - Partizan Igokea Belgrade: 61 - 60 (W)
2. (29.10.2008) Olimpia Armani Jeans Milano - Efes Pilsen: 71 - 81 (W)
3. (05.11.2008) Efes Pilsen - Panionios On Telecoms Athens: 69 - 78 (L)
4. (12.11.2008) CSKA Moscow - Efes Pilsen: 90 - 68 (L)
5. (26.11.2008) Efes Pilsen - Real Madrid: 81 - 95 (L)
6. (03.12.2008) Partizan Igokea Belgrade - Efes Pilsen: 83 - 77 (L)
7. (10.12.2008) Efes Pilsen - Olimpia Armani Jeans Milano: 74 - 67 (W)
8. (18.12.2008) Panionios On Telecoms Athens - Efes Pilsen: 64 - 78 (W)
9. (07.01.2009) Efes Pilsen - CSKA Moscow: 55 - 74 (L)
10. (14.01.2009) Real Madrid - Efes Pilsen: 80 - 69 (L)

== 2009-10 Euroleague ==
Regular Season Group: (finished 4th in Group B with 4-6)

1. (22.10.2009) Lietuvos Rytas Vilnius - Efes Pilsen: 77 - 70 (L)
2. (29.10.2009) Efes Pilsen - Partizan Belgrade: 77 - 67 (W)
3. (05.11.2009) Unicaja Málaga - Efes Pilsen: 93 - 88 (L) (after overtime)
4. (12.11.2009) Olympiacos Piraeus - Efes Pilsen: 105 - 90 (L)
5. (26.11.2009) Efes Pilsen - Entente Orleanaise Loiret: 77 - 64 (W)
6. (03.12.2009) Efes Pilsen - Lietuvos Rytas Vilnius: 77 - 62 (W)
7. (10.12.2009) Partizan Belgrade - Efes Pilsen: 93 - 92 (L)
8. (17.12.2009) Efes Pilsen - Unicaja Málaga: 77 - 79 (L)
9. (07.01.2010) Efes Pilsen - Olympiacos Piraeus: 85 - 93 (L) (after overtime)
10. (13.01.2010) Entente Orleanaise Loiret - Efes Pilsen: 60 - 75 (W)

Top 16 Group: (finished bottom of Group F with 2-4)

1. (27.01.2010) Real Madrid - Efes Pilsen: 77 - 70 (L)
2. (03.02.2010) Efes Pilsen - Montepaschi Siena: 88 - 78 (W)
3. (11.02.2010) Maccabi Tel Aviv - Efes Pilsen: 72 - 62 (L)
4. (24.02.2010) Efes Pilsen - Maccabi Tel Aviv: 63 - 56 (W)
5. (04.03.2010) Efes Pilsen - Real Madrid: 75 - 77 (L)
6. (11.03.2010) Montepaschi Siena - Efes Pilsen: 93 - 87 (L)

== 2010-11 Euroleague ==
Regular Season Group: (finished 3rd in Group D with 5-5)

1. (20.10.2010) Union Olimpija Ljubljana - Efes Pilsen: 95 - 90 (L) (after 2 overtimes)
2. (27.10.2010) Efes Pilsen - Power Electronics Valencia: 79 - 63 (W)
3. (03.11.2010) Efes Pilsen - Olimpia Armani Jeans Milano: 82 - 74 (W)
4. (11.11.2010) Panathinaikos Athens - Efes Pilsen: 84 - 61 (L)
5. (18.11.2010) Efes Pilsen - CSKA Moscow: 86 - 72 (W)
6. (25.11.2010) Efes Pilsen - Union Olimpija Ljubljana: 84 - 78 (W)
7. (02.12.2010) Power Electronics Valencia - Efes Pilsen: 62 - 56 (L)
8. (08.12.2010) Olimpia Armani Jeans Milano - Efes Pilsen: 84 - 70 (L)
9. (15.12.2010) Efes Pilsen - Panathinaikos Athens: 79 - 78 (W)
10. (22.12.2010) CSKA Moscow - Efes Pilsen: 78 - 69 (L)

Top 16 Group: (finished 3rd in Group G with 2-4)

1. (19.01.2011) Efes Pilsen - Montepaschi Siena: 60 - 58 (W)
2. (26.01.2011) Partizan mt:s Belgrade - Efes Pilsen: 76 - 79 (W)
3. (03.02.2011) Real Madrid - Efes Pilsen: 89 - 86 (L) (after overtime)
4. (17.02.2011) Efes Pilsen - Real Madrid: 60 - 77 (L)
5. (24.02.2011) Montepaschi Siena - Efes Pilsen: 88 - 76 (L)
6. (03.03.2011) Efes Pilsen - Partizan mt:s Belgrade: 65 - 67 (L)

== 2011-12 Euroleague ==
Regular Season Group: (finished 3rd in Group C with 5-5)

1. (20.10.2011) Partizan mt:s Belgrade - Anadolu Efes: 73 - 84 (W)
2. (26.10.2011) Anadolu Efes - Belgacom Spirou Charleroi: 79 - 80 (L)
3. (03.11.2011) EA7 Emporio Armani Milano - Anadolu Efes: 54 - 62 (W)
4. (10.11.2011) Anadolu Efes - Maccabi Tel Aviv: 72 - 79 (L)
5. (17.11.2011) Real Madrid - Anadolu Efes: 104 - 84 (L)
6. (23.11.2011) Anadolu Efes - Partizan mt:s Belgrade: 67 - 58 (W)
7. (30.11.2011) Belgacom Spirou Charleroi - Anadolu Efes: 62 - 66 (W)
8. (07.12.2011) Anadolu Efes - EA7 Emporio Armani Milano: 84 - 70 (W)
9. (15.12.2011) Maccabi Tel Aviv - Anadolu Efes: 96 - 57 (L)
10. (22.12.2011) Anadolu Efes - Real Madrid: 66 - 75 (L)

Top 16 Group: (finished bottom of Group E with 1-5)

1. (19.01.2012) Anadolu Efes - Galatasaray Medical Park Istanbul: 68 - 62 (W)
2. (25.01.2012) CSKA Moscow - Anadolu Efes: 96 - 68 (L)
3. (01.02.2012) Olympiacos Piraeus - Anadolu Efes: 83 - 65 (L)
4. (08.02.2012) Anadolu Efes - Olympiacos Piraeus: 65 - 67 (L)
5. (22.02.2012) Galatasaray Medical Park Istanbul - Anadolu Efes: 64 - 56 (L)
6. (01.03.2012) Anadolu Efes - CSKA Moscow: 65 - 82 (L)

== 2012-13 Euroleague ==
Regular Season Group: (finished 3rd in Group C with 5-5)

1. (12.10.2012) EA7 Emporio Armani Milano - Anadolu Efes: 80 - 75 (L)
2. (19.10.2012) Anadolu Efes - Olympiacos Piraeus: 98 - 72 (W)
3. (26.10.2012) Anadolu Efes - Cedevita Zagreb: 85 - 66 (W)
4. (01.11.2012) Caja Laboral Vitoria - Anadolu Efes: 64 - 76 (W)
5. (09.11.2012) Anadolu Efes - Žalgiris Kaunas: 64 - 77 (L)
6. (16.11.2012) Anadolu Efes - EA7 Emporio Armani Milano: 77 - 71 (W)
7. (22.11.2012) Olympiacos Piraeus - Anadolu Efes: 75 - 53 (L)
8. (29.11.2012) Cedevita Zagreb - Anadolu Efes: 73 - 81 (W)
9. (07.12.2012) Anadolu Efes - Caja Laboral Vitoria: 76 - 91 (L)
10. (14.12.2012) Žalgiris Kaunas - Anadolu Efes: 71 - 53 (L)

Top 16 Group: (finished 3rd in Group E with 9-5)

1. (28.12.2012) CSKA Moscow - Anadolu Efes: 90 - 71 (L)
2. (03.01.2013) Anadolu Efes - Panathinaikos Athens: 78 - 64 (W)
3. (11.01.2013) Anadolu Efes - Alba Berlin: 71 - 62 (W)
4. (17.01.2013) Brose Baskets Bamberg - Anadolu Efes: 76 - 94 (W)
5. (25.01.2013) Anadolu Efes - Zalgiris Kaunas: 56 - 52 (W)
6. (01.02.2013) Unicaja Malaga - Anadolu Efes: 73 - 78 (W)
7. (14.02.2013) Anadolu Efes - Real Madrid: 74 - 72 (W)
8. (22.02.2013) Anadolu Efes - CSKA Moscow: 63 - 60 (W)
9. (01.03.2013) Panathinaikos Athens - Anadolu Efes: 75 - 62 (L)
10. (06.03.2013) Alba Berlin - Anadolu Efes: 86 - 91 (W)
11. (14.03.2013) Anadolu Efes - Brose Baskets Bamberg: 89 - 86 (W) (after overtime)
12. (21.03.2013) Zalgiris Kaunas - Anadolu Efes: 79 - 71 (L)
13. (28.03.2013) Anadolu Efes - Unicaja Malaga: 64 - 70 (L)
14. (04.04.2013) Real Madrid - Anadolu Efes: 86 - 66 (L)

Quarterfinal:

1. (10.04.2013) Olympiacos Piraeus - Anadolu Efes: 67 - 62 (L)
2. (12.04.2013) Olympiacos Piraeus - Anadolu Efes: 71 - 53 (L)
3. (17.04.2013) Anadolu Efes - Olympiacos Piraeus: 83 - 72 (W)
4. (19.04.2013) Anadolu Efes - Olympiacos Piraeus: 74 - 73 (W)
5. (26.04.2013) Olympiacos Piraeus - Anadolu Efes: 82 - 72 (L)

== 2013-14 Euroleague ==
Regular Season Group: (finished 4th in Group B with 4-6)

1. (17.10.2013) Anadolu Efes - EA7 Emporio Armani Milano: 87 - 67 (W)
2. (25.10.2013) Strasbourg IG - Anadolu Efes: 66 - 76 (W)
3. (01.11.2013) Brose Baskets Bamberg - Anadolu Efes: 88 - 86 (L)
4. (07.11.2013) Anadolu Efes - Zalgiris Kaunas: 72 - 61 (W)
5. (13.11.2013) Real Madrid - Anadolu Efes: 103 - 57 (L)
6. (22.11.2013) EA7 Emporio Armani Milano - Anadolu Efes: 77 - 73 (L)
7. (29.11.2013) Anadolu Efes - Strasbourg IG: 88 - 65 (W)
8. (06.12.2013) Anadolu Efes - Brose Baskets Bamberg: 78 - 89 (L)
9. (12.12.2013) Zalgiris Kaunas - Anadolu Efes: 65 - 63 (L)
10. (19.12.2013) Anadolu Efes - Real Madrid: 61 - 86 (L)

Top 16 Group: (finished bottom of Group E with 2-12)

1. (02.01.2014) FC Barcelona - Anadolu Efes: 84 - 65 (L)
2. (10.01.2014) Anadolu Efes - Unicaja Malaga: 72 - 74 (L)
3. (17.01.2014) Panathinaikos Athens - Anadolu Efes: 78 - 64 (L)
4. (24.01.2014) Anadolu Efes - EA7 Emporio Armani Milano: 61 - 60 (W)
5. (31.01.2014) Laboral Kutxa Vitoria - Anadolu Efes: 66 - 72 (W)
6. (13.02.2014) Olympiacos Piraeus - Anadolu Efes: 78 - 60 (L)
7. (21.02.2014) Anadolu Efes - Fenerbahçe Ülker İstanbul: 63 - 71 (L)
8. (27.02.2014) Anadolu Efes - FC Barcelona: 84 - 89 (L) (after overtime)
9. (07.03.2014) Unicaja Malaga - Anadolu Efes: 83 - 75 (L)
10. (14.03.2014) Anadolu Efes - Panathinaikos Athens: 60 - 65 (L) (after overtime)
11. (21.03.2014) EA7 Emporio Armani Milano - Anadolu Efes: 76 - 69 (L)
12. (27.03.2014) Anadolu Efes - Laboral Kutxa Vitoria: 79 - 105 (L)
13. (04.04.2014) Anadolu Efes - Olympiacos Piraeus: 78 - 83 (L)
14. (10.04.2014) Fenerbahçe Ülker İstanbul - Anadolu Efes: 84 - 65 (L)

== 2014-15 Euroleague ==
Regular Season Group: (finished 2nd in Group A with 6-4)

1. (16.10.2014) Anadolu Efes - UNICS Kazan: 82 - 76 (W)
2. (24.10.2014) Dinamo Banco di Sardegna Sassari - Anadolu Efes: 75 - 82 (W)
3. (30.10.2014) Anadolu Efes - Zalgiris Kaunas: 62 - 65 (L)
4. (06.11.2014) Nizhny Novgorod - Anadolu Efes: 66 - 76 (W)
5. (14.11.2014) Anadolu Efes - Real Madrid: 75 - 73 (W)
6. (20.11.2014) UNICS Kazan - Anadolu Efes: 67 - 64 (L)
7. (28.11.2014) Anadolu Efes - Dinamo Banco di Sardegna Sassari: 85 - 62 (W)
8. (04.12.2014) Zalgiris Kaunas - Anadolu Efes: 57 - 66 (W)
9. (12.12.2014) Anadolu Efes - Nizhny Novgorod: 61 - 65 (L)
10. (18.12.2014) Real Madrid - Anadolu Efes: 90 - 70 (L)

Top 16 Group: (finished 4th in Group F with 6-8)

1. (02.01.2015) Laboral Kutxa Vitoria - Anadolu Efes: 67 - 72 (W)
2. (09.01.2015) Anadolu Efes - Unicaja Malaga: 74 - 70 (W)
3. (15.01.2015) Anadolu Efes - CSKA Moscow: 69 - 78 (L)
4. (23.01.2015) Nizhny Novgorod - Anadolu Efes: 109 - 90 (L)
5. (29.01.2015) Anadolu Efes - Olympiacos Piraeus: 84 - 70 (W)
6. (06.02.2015) EA7 Emporio Armani Milano - Anadolu Efes: 71 - 73 (W)
7. (13.02.2015) Anadolu Efes - Fenerbahçe Ülker İstanbul: 71 - 77 (L)
8. (27.02.2015) Anadolu Efes - Laboral Kutxa Vitoria: 84 - 87 (L)
9. (06.03.2015) Unicaja Malaga - Anadolu Efes: 93 - 90 (L)
10. (13.03.2015) CSKA Moscow - Anadolu Efes: 88 - 83 (L)
11. (19.03.2015) Anadolu Efes - Nizhny Novgorod: 79 - 75 (W)
12. (26.03.2015) Olympiacos Piraeus - Anadolu Efes: 86 - 75 (L)
13. (03.04.2015) Anadolu Efes - EA7 Emporio Armani Milano: 86 - 78 (W)
14. (09.04.2015) Fenerbahçe Ülker İstanbul - Anadolu Efes: 83 - 72 (L)

Quarterfinal:

1. (15.04.2015) Real Madrid - Anadolu Efes: 80 - 71 (L)
2. (17.04.2015) Real Madrid - Anadolu Efes: 90 - 85 (L)
3. (21.04.2015) Anadolu Efes - Real Madrid: 75 - 72 (W)
4. (23.04.2015) Anadolu Efes - Real Madrid: 63 - 76 (L)

== 2015-16 Euroleague ==
Regular season: (finished 2nd in Group A with 6-4)

1. (15.10.2015) Limoges CSP - Anadolu Efes : 77 - 89 (W)
2. (24.10.2015) Anadolu Efes - EA7 Emporio Armani Milano : 89 - 73 (W)
3. (29.10.2015) Anadolu Efes - Cedevita Zagreb : 75 - 81 (L)
4. (05.11.2015) Laboral Kutxa Vitoria - Anadolu Efes : 92 - 90 (L)
5. (12.11.2015) Anadolu Efes - Olympiacos Piraeus : 87 - 91 (L)
6. (20.11.2015) Anadolu Efes - Limoges CSP : 92 - 74 (W)
7. (26.12.2015) EA7 Emporio Armani Milano - Anadolu Efes : 88 - 84 (L)
8. (03.12.2015) Cedevita Zagreb - Anadolu Efes : 75 - 81 (W)
9. (10.12.2015) Anadolu Efes - Laboral Kutxa Vitoria : 95 - 86 (W)
10. (18.12.2015) Olympiacos Piraeus - Anadolu Efes : 68 - 81 (W)

Top 16: (finished 5th in Group F with 7-7)

1. (29.12.2015) Anadolu Efes - Crvena Zvezda : 85 - 84 (W)
2. (08.01.2016) Lokomotiv Kuban - Anadolu Efes : 78 - 77 (L)
3. (15.01.2016) Anadolu Efes - Darüşşafaka Doğuş : 84 - 71 (W)
4. (21.01.2016) Cedevita Zagreb - Anadolu Efes : 84 - 80 (L)
5. (29.01.2016) Unicaja Malaga - Anadolu Efes: 75 - 85 (W)
6. (05.02.2016) Anadolu Efes - Fenerbahçe : 73 - 77 (L)
7. (12.02.2016) Panathinaikos - Anadolu Efes : 83 - 78 (L)
8. (26.02.2016) Crvena Zvezda - Anadolu Efes : 91 - 82 (L)
9. (03.03.2016) Anadolu Efes - Lokomotiv Kuban : 61 - 76 (L)
10. (11.03.2016) Darüşşafaka Doğuş - Anadolu Efes : 68 - 72 (W)
11. (18.03.2016) Anadolu Efes - Cedevita Zagreb : 80 - 76 (W)
12. (25.03.2016) Anadolu Efes - Unicaja Malaga : 87 - 67 (W)
13. (01.04.2016) Fenerbahçe - Anadolu Efes : 90 - 86 (L)
14. (07.04.2016) Anadolu Efes - Panathinaikos : 91 - 86 (W)

== 2016-17 EuroLeague ==
Regular season: (finished 6th in group with 17-13)

1. (14.10.2016) Baskonia Vitoria Gasteiz - Anadolu Efes : 85 - 84 (L)
2. (20.10.2016) Olympiacos Piraeus - Anadolu Efes : 90 - 66 (L)
3. (25.10.2016) Anadolu Efes - CSKA Moskova : 87 - 93 (L)
4. (27.10.2016) Darüşşafaka Doğuş - Anadolu Efes : 79 - 84 (W)
5. (04.11.2016) Anadolu Efes - Panathinaikos Superfoods Athens : 91 - 83 (W)
6. (10.11.2016) EA7 Emporio Armani Milan - Anadolu Efes: 105 - 92 (L)
7. (15.11.2016) Anadolu Efes - Unics Kazan : 104 - 99 (W)
8. (17.11.2016) Fenerbahçe - Anadolu Efes : 88 - 80 (L)
9. (24.11.2016) Anadolu Efes - Crvena Zvezda mts Belgrade : 100 - 79 (W)
10. (01.12.2016) Maccabi FOX Tel Aviv - Anadolu Efes : 77 - 86 (W)
11. (09.12.2016) Anadolu Efes - FC Barcelona Lassa - : 72 - 68 (W)
12. (15.12.2016) Brose Bamberg - Anadolu Efes : 91 - 83 (L)
13. (20.12.2016) Anadolu Efes - Zalgiris Kaunas : 71 - 84 (L)
14. (22.12.2016) Galatasaray Odeabank - Anadolu Efes : 76 - 86 (W)
15. (29.12.2016) Anadolu Efes - Real Madrid : 78 - 80 (L)
16. (05.01.2017) Anadolu Efes - Galatasaray Odeabank : 84 - 73 (W)
17. (13.01.2017) Panathinaikos Superfoods Athens - Anadolu Efes : 92 - 81 (L)
18. (19.01.2017) FC Barcelona Lassa - Anadolu Efes : 89 - 78 (L)
19. (25.01.2017) Anadolu Efes - Darüşşafaka Doğuş : 93 - 81 (W)
20. (27.01.2017) CSKA Moskova - Anadolu Efes : 80 - 77 (L)
21. (03.02.2017) Crvena Zvezda mts Belgrade - Anadolu Efes : 72 - 86 (W)
22. (09.02.2017) Anadolu Efes - EA7 Emporio Armani Milan : 90 - 86 (W)
23. (24.02.2017) Anadolu Efes - Baskonia Vitoria Gasteiz : 96 - 85 (W)
24. (03.03.2017) Unics Kazan - Anadolu Efes : 92 - 99 (W)
25. (10.02.2017) Anadolu Efes - Brose Bamberg : 68 - 87 (L)
26. (16.02.2017) Anadolu Efes - Maccabi FOX Tel Aviv : 92 - 87 (W)
27. (21.03.2017) Zalgiris Kaunas - Anadolu Efes : 68 - 76 (W)
28. (23.03.2017) Anadolu Efes - Fenerbahçe : 80 - 77 (W)
29. (30.03.2017) Anadolu Efes - Olympiacos Piraeus : 77 - 69 (W)
30. (07.04.2017) Real Madrid - Anadolu Efes : 97 - 80 (L)

Quarterfinal:

1. (19.04.2017) Piraeus Olympiacos - Anadolu Efes: 87 - 72 (L)
2. (21.04.2017) Piraeus Olympiacos - Anadolu Efes: 71 - 73 (W)
3. (26.04.2017) Anadolu Efes - Piraeus Olympiacos: 64 - 60 (W)
4. (28.04.2017) Anadolu Efes - Piraeus Olympiacos: 62 - 74 (L)
5. (02.05.2017) Piraeus Olympiacos - Anadolu Efes: 87 - 78 (L)

== 2017-18 EuroLeague ==
Regular season: (finished 16th in group with 7-23)

1. (12.10.2017) Anadolu Efes - Real Madrid : 74 - 88 (L)
2. (20.10.2017) Valencia Basket - Anadolu Efes : 78 - 71 (L)
3. (25.10.2017) Fenerbahçe Doğuş - Anadolu Efes : 81 - 70 (L)
4. (27.10.2017) CSKA Moskova - Anadolu Efes : 80 - 98 (L)
5. (03.11.2017) Anadolu Efes - Unicaja Malaga : 74 - 79 (L)
6. (09.11.2017) FC Barcelona Lassa - Anadolu Efes: 84 - 89 (W)
7. (14.11.2017) Maccabi FOX Tel Aviv - Anadolu Efes : 72 - 92 (W)
8. (16.11.2017) Anadolu Efes - Panathinaikos Superfoods Athens : 81 - 82 (L)
9. (23.11.2017) Zalgiris Kaunas - Anadolu Efes : 91 - 83 (L)
10. (30.12.2017) Anadolu Efes - AX Armani Exchange Milan : 73 - 68 (W)
11. (08.12.2017) Crvena Zvezda mts Belgrade - Anadolu Efes : 100 - 81 (L)
12. (15.12.2017) Anadolu Efes - Baskonia Vittoria : 81 - 82 (L)
13. (20.12.2017) Khimki Moscow Region - Anadolu Efes : 86 - 68 (L)
14. (23.12.2017) Anadolu Efes - Olympiacos Piraeus : 58 - 61 (L)
15. (28.12.2017) Anadolu Efes - Brose Basket Bamberg : 69 - 58 (W)
16. (04.01.2018) Panathinaikos Superfoods Athens - Anadolu Efes : 90 - 79 (L)
17. (12.01.2018) Anadolu Efes - Crvena Zvezda mts Belgrade : 104 - 95 (W)
18. (17.01.2018) CSKA Moskova - Anadolu Efes : 110 - 79 (L)
19. (19.01.2018) Anadolu Efes - Fenerbahçe Doğuş : 84 - 89 (L)
20. (25.01.2018) Real Madrid - Anadolu Efes : 87 - 68 (L)
21. (01.02.2018) Anadolu Efes - Valencia Basket : 82 - 66 (W)
22. (08.02.2018) Unicaja Malaga - Anadolu Efes : 79 - 68 (L)
23. (23.02.2018) Anadolu Efes - Zalgiris Kaunas : 70 - 86 (L)
24. (01.03.2018) AX Armani Exchange Milan - Anadolu Efes : 77 - 64 (L)
25. (06.03.2018) Anadolu Efes - Maccabi FOX Tel Aviv : 81 - 94 (L)
26. (15.03.2018) Brose Basket Bamberg - Anadolu Efes : 88 - 79 (L)
27. (21.03.2018) Anadolu Efes - Khimki Moscow Region : 73 - 85 (L)
28. (23.03.2018) Olympiacos Piraeus - Anadolu Efes : 89 - 82 (L)
29. (29.03.2018) Anadolu Efes - FC Barcelona Lassa : 83 - 107 (L)
30. (05.04.2018) Baskonia Vittoria - Anadolu Efes : 79 - 81 (W)

== 2018-19 EuroLeague ==
Regular season: (finished 4th in group with 20-10)

1. (11.10.2018) FC Bayern München - Anadolu Efes : 71 - 90 (W)
2. (17.10.2018) Anadolu Efes - Zalgiris Kaunas : 79 - 73 (L)
3. (19.10.2018) Khimki Moscow Region - Anadolu Efes : 84 - 85 (W)
4. (25.10.2018) Anadolu Efes - Fenerbahçe : 89 - 83 (W)
5. (02.11.2018) AX Armani Exchange Milan - Anadolu Efes : 81 - 80 (L)
6. (08.11.2018) Herbalife Gran Canaria - Anadolu Efes: 90 - 94 (W)
7. (16.11.2018) Anadolu Efes - Panathinaikos OPAP Athens : 78 - 62 (W)
8. (20.11.2018) Anadolu Efes - Maccabi FOX Tel-Aviv : 90 - 77 (W)
9. (22.11.2018) Darüşşafaka Tekfen - Anadolu Efes : 88 - 93 (W)
10. (30.11.2018) Anadolu Efes - Kirolbet Baskonia Vitoria Gasteiz : 96 - 85 (W)
11. (07.12.2018) Anadolu Efes - Real Madrid : 82 - 84 (L)
12. (13.12.2018) Olympiacos Piraeus - Anadolu Efes : 88 - 81 (L)
13. (18.12.2018) Anadolu Efes - Buducnost Voli Podgoricia : 106 - 68 (W)
14. (20.12.2018) CSKA Moskova - Anadolu Efes : 102 - 84 (L)
15. (27.12.2018) FC Barcelona Lassa - Anadolu Efes : 80 - 65 (L)
16. (03.01.2019) Anadolu Efes - FC Bayern München : 92 - 77 (W)
17. (08.01.2019) Zalgiris Kaunas - Anadolu Efes : 58 - 79 (W)
18. (10.01.2019) Anadolu Efes - Khimki Moscow Region : 81 - 72 (W)
19. (18.01.2019) Anadolu Efes - Darüşşafaka Tekfen : 82 - 68 (W)
20. (24.01.2019) Real Madrid - Anadolu Efes : 92 - 84 (L)
21. (01.02.2019) Panathinaikos OPAP Athens - Anadolu Efes : 88 - 75 (L)
22. (07.02.2019) Anadolu Efes - Herbalife Gran Canaria : 93 - 74 (W)
23. (21.02.2019) Anadolu Efes - Olympiacos Piraeus : 75 - 65 (L)
24. (28.02.2019) Fenerbahçe Beko - Anadolu Efes : 84 - 66 (L)
25. (06.03.2019) Anadolu Efes - FC Barcelona Lassa : 92 - 70 (W)
26. (14.03.2019) Maccabi FOX Tel-Aviv - Anadolu Efes : 71 - 79 (W)
27. (19.03.2019) Anadolu Efes - CSKA Moskova : 78 - 80 (L)
28. (21.03.2019) Buducnost Voli Podgoricia - Anadolu Efes : 84 - 94 (W)
29. (29.03.2019) Kirolbet Baskonia Vitoria Gasteiz - Anadolu Efes : 92 - 102 (W)
30. (30.04.2019) Anadolu Efes AX - Armani Exchange Milan : 101 - 95 (W)

Quarterfinal:

1. (16.04.2019) Anadolu Efes - FC Barcelona Lassa : 75 - 68 (W)
2. (19.04.2019) Anadolu Efes - FC Barcelona Lassa : 72 - 74 (L)
3. (24.04.2019) FC Barcelona Lassa - Anadolu Efes: 68 - 102 (W)
4. (26.04.2019) FC Barcelona Lassa - Anadolu Efes: 82 - 72 (L)
5. (01.05.2019) Anadolu Efes - FC Barcelona Lassa : 80 - 71 (W)

Final Four:

1. (17.05.2019) Fenerbahçe Beko - Anadolu Efes : 73 - 92 (W)
2. (19.05.2019) Anadolu Efes - CSKA Moskova : 83 - 91 (L)

== 2019-20 EuroLeague ==
Regular season: (The season was cancelled while Anadolu Efes were leading in group with 23-4)

1. (04.10.2019) Anadolu Efes - FC Barcelona Lassa : 64 - 74 (L)
2. (11.10.2019) Anadolu Efes - ALBA Berlin : 106 - 105 (W)
3. (18.10.2019) Valencia Basket - Anadolu Efes : 78 - 83 (W)
4. (24.10.2019) Anadolu Efes - Real Madrid : 76 - 60 (W)
5. (29.10.2019) Anadolu Efes - Crvena Zvezda mts Belgrade : 85 - 70 (W)
6. (31.10.2019) Panathinaikos OPAP Athens - Anadolu Efes: 86 - 70 (L)
7. (07.11.2019) Olympiacos Piraeus - Anadolu Efes : 67 - 86 (W)
8. (14.11.2019) Anadolu Efes - Zenit st. Pettersburg : 90 - 88 (W)
9. (19.11.2019) LDLC Asvel Lyon Villeurbanne - Anadolu Efes : 84 - 90 (W)
10. (21.11.2019) AX Armani Exchange Milan - Anadolu Efes : 76 - 81 (W)
11. (29.11.2019) Anadolu Efes - FC Bayern Müchen : 104 - 75 (W)
12. (06.12.2019) Kirolbet Baskonia Vitoria Gasteiz - Anadolu Efes : 77 - 102 (W)
13. (12.12.2019) Fenerbahçe Beko - Anadolu Efes : 73 - 81 (W)
14. (17.12.2019) Zalgiris Kaunas - Anadolu Efes : 68 - 74 (W)
15. (20.12.2019) Anadolu Efes - CSKA Moskova : 80 - 81 (L)
16. (26.12.2019) Anadolu Efes - Maccabi FOX Tel-Aviv : 99 - 79 (W)
17. (04.01.2020) Anadolu Efes - Khimki Moscow Region : 101 - 82 (W)
18. (10.01.2020) FC Barcelona Lassa - Anadolu Efes : 82 - 86 (W)
19. (14.01.2020) Anadolu Efes - AX Armani Exchange Milan : 88 - 68 (W)
20. (17.01.2020) Anadolu Efes - LDLC Asvel Lyon Villeurbanne : 101 - 74 (W)
21. (24.01.2020) Real Madrid - Anadolu Efes : 75 - 80 (W)
22. (31.01.2020) Crvena Zvezda mts Belgrade - Anadolu Efes : 78 - 85 (W)
23. (04.02.2020) CSKA Moscow - Anadolu Efes : 80 - 82 (W)
24. (06.02.2020) Anadolu Efes - Zalgiris Kaunas : 96 - 91 (W)
25. (21.02.2020) FC Bayern München - Anadolu Efes : 63 - 88 "(W)"
26. (04.03.2020) Maccabi FOX Tel-Aviv - Anadolu Efes : 77 - 75 "(L)"
27. (06.03.2020) Anadolu Efes - Olympiacos Piraeus : 91 - 79 (W)

== 2020-21 EuroLeague ==
Regular season: (finished 3rd in group with 22-12)

1. (01.10.2020) Anadolu Efes - Zenit st. Pettersburg : 69 - 73 (L)
2. (08.10.2020) Anadolu Efes - Fenerbahçe Beko : 71 - 80 (L)
3. (13.10.2020) Alba Berlin - Anadolu Efes : 72 - 93 (W)
4. (15.10.2020) Zalgiris Kaunas - Anadolu Efes : 89 - 73 (L)
5. (08.12.2020) Anadolu Efes - LDLC Asvel Lyon Villeurbanne : 72 - 68 (W)
6. (30.10.2020) Pire Olympiacos - Anadolu Efes : 79 - 84 (W)
7. (05.11.2020) Anadolu Efes - Maccabi Playtika Tel-Aviv : 91 - 89 (W)
8. (13.11.2020) Panathinaikos OPAP Athens - Anadolu Efes: 77 - 80 (W)
9. (17.11.2020) Anadolu Efes - Bayern München : 71 - 74 (L)
10. (19.11.2020) BC Khimki - Anadolu Efes : 77 - 105 (W)
11. (26.11.2020) Crvena Zvezda - Anadolu Efes : 64 - 75 (W)
12. (04.12.2020) Anadolu Efes - TD Systems Baskonia Vitoria-Gasteiz : 59 - 77 (L)
13. (10.12.2020) Valencia Basket - Anadolu Efes : 76 - 74 (L)
14. (15.12.2020) CSKA Moskova - Anadolu Efes : 100 - 65 (L)
15. (17.12.2020) Anadolu Efes - AX Armani Exchange Milano : 69 - 72 (L)
16. (22.12.2020) Anadolu Efes - FC Barcelona : 86 - 79 (W)
17. (29.12.2020) Anadolu Efes - Real Madrid : 65 - 73 (L)
18. (08.01.2021) LDLC Asvel Lyon Villeurbanne - Anadolu Efes : 80 - 102 (W)
19. (12.01.2021) Anadolu Efes - Alba Berlin : 84 - 76 (W)
20. (14.01.2021) Anadolu Efes - BC Khimki : 99 - 60 (W)
21. (21.01.2021) Zenit St. Petersburg - Anadolu Efes : 85 - 78 (L)
22. (26.01.2021) Anadolu Efes - Crvena Zvezda : 86 - 72 (W)
23. (28.01.2021) Maccabi Playtika Tel-Aviv - Anadolu Efes : 66 - 90 (W)
24. (04.02.2021) FC Barcelona - Anadolu Efes : 86 - 88 (W)
25. (18.02.2021) Anadolu Efes - Pire Olympiacos : 76 - 53 (W)
26. (26.02.2021) Fenerbahçe Beko - Anadolu Efes : 74 - 106 (W)
27. (02.03.2021) Anadolu Efes - Valencia Basket : 99 - 83 (W)
28. (04.03.2021) Anadolu Efes - CSKA Moskova : 100 - 70 (W)
29. (12.03.2021) Anadolu Efes - Zalgiris Kaunas : 89 - 62 (W)
30. (19.03.2021) FC Bayern München - Anadolu Efes : 80 - 79 (L)
31. (25.03.2021) Anadolu Efes - Panathinaikos OPAP Atina : 85 - 65 (W)
32. (30.03.2021) Real Madrid - Anadolu Efes : 83 - 108 (W)
33. (01.04.2021) TD Systems Baskonia Vitoria-Gasteiz - Anadolu Efes : 101 - 111 (W)
34. (09.04.2021) AX Armani Exchange Milano - Anadolu Efes : 98 - 75 (L)

Quarterfinal:

1. (20.04.2021) Anadolu Efes - Real Madrid : 90 - 63 (W)
2. (22.04.2021) Anadolu Efes - Real Madrid : 91 - 68 (W)
3. (27.04.2021) Real Madrid - Anadolu Efes : 80 - 76 (L)
4. (29.04.2021) Real Madrid - Anadolu Efes : 82 - 76 (L)
5. (04.05.2021) Anadolu Efes - Real Madrid : 88 - 83 (W)

Final-Four:

1. (28.05.2021) CSKA Moskova - Anadolu Efes : 86 - 89 (W)
2. (30.05.2021) Barcelona - Anadolu Efes : 81 - 86 (W)

Anadolu Efes 1st EuroLeague title has been won.

== 2021-22 EuroLeague ==
Regular season: (finished 6th in group with 16-12)

1. (30.09.2021) Real Madrid - Anadolu Efes : 82 - 69 (L)
2. (08.10.2021) Anadolu Efes - CSKA Moskova : 96 - 100 (L)
3. (12.10.2021) LDLC Asvel Lyon Villeurbanne - Anadolu Efes : 75 - 73 (L)
4. (16.10.2021) AX Armani Exchange Milan - Anadolu Efes : 75 - 71 (L)
5. (21.10.2021) Anadolu Efes - Unics Kazan : 71 - 68 (W)
6. (27.10.2021) Panathinaikos OPAP Atina - Anadolu Efes : 95 - 69 (L)
7. (29.10.2021) Anadolu Efes - Zalgiris Kaunas : 94 - 60 (W)
8. (05.11.2021) Anadolu Efes - Zenit st. Petersburg : 79 - 90 (L)
9. (11.11.2021) ALBA Berlin - Anadolu Efes : 63 - 90 (W)
10. (17.11.2021) Anadolu Efes - Olympiacos Piraeus : 88 - 69 (W)
11. (19.11.2021) Anadolu Efes - AS Monaco : 98 - 77 (W)
12. (25.11.2021) Fenerbahçe Beko - Anadolu Efes : 84 - 89 (W)
13. (03.12.2021) Anadolu Efes - FC Barcelona : 93 - 95 (L)
14. (09.12.2021) FC Bayern München - Anadolu Efes : 83 - 71 (L)
15. (14.12.2021) Anadolu Efes - BITCI Baskonia Vitoria-Gasteiz : 87 - 72 (W)
16. (16.12.2021) Maccabi Playtika Tel Aviv - Anadolu Efes : 78 - 92 (W)
17. (22.12.2021) Anadolu Efes - Crvena Zvezda : 84 - 73 (W)
18. (30.12.2021) Unics Kazan - Anadolu Efes : 75 - 67 (L)
19. (13.01.2022) Fc Barcelona - Anadolu Efes : 82 - 77 (L)
20. (21.01.2022) Anadolu Efes - Panathinaikos OPAP Atina : 82 - 81 (W)
21. (27.01.2022) Zenit St. Petersburg - Anadolu Efes : 76 - 67 (L)
22. (02.02.2022) CSKA Moskova - Anadolu Efes : 97 - 99 (W)
23. (04.02.2022) Anadolu Efes - LDLC Asvel Lyon : 78 - 72 (W)
24. (10.02.2022) Pire Olympiacos - Anadolu Efes : 87 - 85 (L)
25. (24.02.2022) Anadolu Efes - Maccabi Playtika Tel Aviv : 109 - 77 (W)
26. (03.03.2022) Anadolu Efes - Fenerbahçe Beko : 84 - 79 (W)
27. (08.03.2022) BITCI Baskonia Vitoria-Gasteiz - Anadolu Efes : 87 - 74 (L)
28. (11.03.2022) AS Monaco - Anadolu Efes : 102 - 80 (L)
29. (17.03.2022) Zalgiris Kaunas - Anadolu Efes : 71 - 85 (W)
30. (22.03.2022) Anadolu Efes - Real Madrid : 93 - 90 (W)
31. (24.03.2022) Anadolu Efes - Ax Armani Exchange Milan : 77 - 83 (L)
32. (01.04.2022) Anadolu Efes - ALBA Berlin : 87 - 77 (W)
33. (06.04.2022) Anadolu Efes - FC Bayern Munich : 81 - 76 (W)
34. (08.04.2022) Crvena Zvezda - Anadolu Efes : 93 - 85 (L)

Quarterfinal:

1. (19.04.2022) AX Armani Exchange Milan - Anadolu Efes : 48 - 64 (W)
2. (21.04.2022) AX Armani Exchange Milan - Anadolu Efes : 73 - 66 (L)
3. (26.04.2022) Anadolu Efes - AX Armani Exchange Milan : 77 - 65 (W)
4. (28.04.2022) Anadolu Efes - AX Armani Exchange Milan : 75 - 70 (W)

Final-Four:

1. (19.05.2022) Pire Olympiacos - Anadolu Efes : 74 - 77 (W)
2. (21.05.2022) Real Madrid - Anadolu Efes : 57 - 58 (W)

Anadolu Efes B2B 2nd EuroLeague title has been won.

== 2022-23 EuroLeague ==
Regular season: (finished 11th in group with 17-17)

1. (07.10.2022) Anadolu Efes - Crvena Zvezda : 72 - 59 (W)
2. (13.10.2022) AS Monaco - Anadolu Efes : 95 - 92 (L)
3. (18.10.2022) Anadolu Efes - Valecia Basket : 91 - 92 (L)
4. (21.10.2022) Anadolu Efes - ALBA Berlin : 78 - 74 (W)
5. (28.10.2022) Anadolu Efes - Fenerbahçe Beko : 79 - 88 (L)
6. (03.11.2022) FC Bayern Munich - Anadolu Efes : 81 - 78 (L)
7. (10.10.2022) Real Madrid - Anadolu Efes : 94 - 85 (L)
8. (17.11.2022) Anadolu Efes - Barcelona : 96 - 86 (W)
9. (22.11.2022) EA7 Emprio Armani Milan - Anadolu Efes : 51 - 80 (W)
10. (25.11.2022) Virtus Segafredo - Anadolu Efes : 80 - 85 (W)
11. (01.12.2022) Anadolu Efes - Pire Olympiacos : 82 - 71 (W)
12. (09.12.2022) Zalgiris Kaunas - Anadolu Efes : 60 - 86 (W)
13. (14.12.2022) Anadolu Efes - Cazoo Baskonia Vitoria Gasteiz : 78 - 83 (L)
14. (16.12.2022) Partizan Mozzart Bet Belgrade - Anadolu Efes : 82 - 79 (L)
15. (23.12.2022) Anadolu Efes - Panathinaikos Athens : 88 - 69 (W)
16. (29.12.2022) Maccabi Playtika Tel Aviv - Anadolu Efes : 80 - 72 (L)
17. (06.01.2023) Anadolu Efes - LDLC Asvel Villeurbanne : 78 - 72 (W)
18. (11.01.2023) Valencia Basket - Anadolu Efes : 81 - 75 (L)
19. (13.01.2023) Barcelona - Anadolu Efes : 75 - 80 (W)
20. (20.01.2023) Anadolu Efes - Bayern München : 81 - 89 (L)
21. (27.01.2023) Cazoo Baskonia Vitoria Gasteiz - Anadolu Efes : 114 - 111 (L)
22. (01.02.2023) Anadolu Efes - Zalgiris Kaunas : 80 - 70 (W)
23. (03.02.2023) Pire Olympiacos - Anadolu Efes : 94 - 75 (L)
24. (14.03.2023) Anadolu Efes - Real Madrid : 90 - 89 (W)
25. (24.02.2023) LDLC Asvel Lyon Villeurbanne - Anadolu Efes : 89 - 90 (W)
26. (02.03.2023) Panathinaikos - Anadolu Efes : 82 - 87 (W)
27. (08.03.2023) Crvena Zvezda - Anadolu Efes : 94 - 75 (L)
28. (10.03.2023) Anadolu Efes - Maccabi Platika Tel Aviv : 64 - 86 (L)
29. (16.03.2023) Anadolu Efes - Partizan Mozzart Bet Belgrad : 84 - 97 (L)
30. (23.03.2023) ALBA Berlin - Anadolu Efes : 95 - 93 (L)
31. (28.03.2023) Anadolu Efes - EA7 Emporia Armani Milan : 89 - 69 (W)
32. (30.03.2023) Anadolu Efes - Virtus Segafredo Bologna : 86 - 67 (W)
33. (06.04.2023) Fenerbahçe Beko - Anadolu Efes : 103 - 86 (L)
34. (14.04.2023) Anadolu Efes - AS Monaco : 87 - 72 (W)

== 2023-24 EuroLeague ==
Regular season: (finished 9th in group with 17-17)

1. (05.10.2023) FC Barcelona - Anadolu Efes : 91 - 74 (L)
2. (12.10.2023) Real Madrid - Anadolu Efes : 80 - 103 (L)
3. (17.10.2023) Anadolu Efes - LDLC Asvel Villeurbanne : 89 - 94 (W)
4. (20.10.2023) Anadolu Efes - Valencia Basket : 77 - 73 (W)
5. (26.10.2023) Pire Olympiacos - Anadolu Efes : 75 - 57 (L)
6. (03.11.2023) Virtus Segafredo Bologna - Anadolu Efes : 93 - 81 (L)
7. (09.11.2023) Anadolu Efes - Zalgiris Kaunas : 86 - 82 (W) (OT)
8. (14.11.2023) AS Monaco - Anadolu Efes : 82 - 89 (W)
9. (16.11.2023) EA7 Emporio Armani Milan - Anadolu Efes : 92 - 76 (L)
10. (24.11.2023) Anadolu Efes - Partizan Mozzart Bet : 100 - 94 (W)
11. (01.12.2023) Crvena Zvezda Meridianbet - Anadolu Efes : 97 - 83 (L)
12. (05.12.2023) Anadolu Efes - Panathinaikos Ator : 71 - 688 (W)
13. (07.12.2023) ALBA Berlin - Anadolu Efes : 89 - 97 (W)
14. (14.12.2023) Maccabi Playtika Tel-Aviv - Anadolu Efes : 95 - 86 (L)
15. (20.12.2023) FC Bayern München - Anadolu Efes : 86 - 71 (L)
16. (22.12.2023) Anadolu Efes - Baskonia Vitoria-Gasteiz : 80 - 87 (L)
17. (28.12.2023) Anadolu Efes - Fenerbahçe Beko : 84 - 89 (L)
18. (03.01.2024) Valecia Basket - Anadolu Efes : 93 - 88 (L)
19. (05.01.2024) Real Madrid - Anadolu Efes : 130 - 126 (L) (4 OT.)
20. (09.01.2024) Panathinaikos Aktor - Anadolu Efes : 83 - 76 (L)
21. (12.01.2024) Anadolu Efes - Virtus Segafredo Bologna : 99 - 75 (W)
22. (18.01.2024) Anadolu Efes - FC Barcelona : 98 - 74 (W)
23. (26.01.2024) Anadolu Efes - AS Monaco : 78 - 80 (L)
24. (31.01.2024) Zalgiris Kaunas - Anadolu Efes : 96 - 70 (L)
25. (02.02.2024) Anadolu Efes - EA7 Emporio Armani Milan : 79 - 73 (W)
26. (08.02.2024) Anadolu Efes - Maccabi Playtika Tel-Aviv : 105 - 91 (W)
27. (29.02.2024) Partizan Mozzart Bet - Anadolu Efes : 100 - 90 (L)
28. (07.03.2024) Anadolu Efes - Bayern München : 109 - 86 (W)
29. (15.03.2024) LDLC Asvel Villeurbanne - Anadolu Efes : 84 - 80 (L)
30. (19.03.2024) Anadolu Efes - Pire Olympiacos : 85 - 72 (W)
31. (21.03.2024) Anadolu Efes - ALBA Berlin : 85 - 84 (W)
32. (28.03.2024) Baskonia Vitoria-Gasteiz - Anadolu Efes : 76 - 97 (W)
33. (05.04.2024) Fenerbahçe Beko - Anadolu Efes : 80 - 82 (W)
34. (11.04.2024) Anadolu Efes - Crvena Zvezda Meridianbet : 110 - 55 (W)

Play-In :

1. (16.04.2024) Anadolu Efes - Virtus Segafredo Bologna : 64 - 67 (L)

== 2024-25 EuroLeague ==
Regular season: (finished 6th in group with 20-14)

1. (04.10.2024) Virtus Segafredo Bologna - Anadolu Efes : 67 - 76 (W)
2. (10.10.2024) Anadolu Efes - Fenerbahçe Beko : 78 - 83 (L)
3. (15.10.2024) Maccabi Playtika Tel Aviv - Anadolu Efes : 93 - 91 (L)
4. (18.10.2024) Anadolu Efes - Pire Olympiacos : 91 - 89 (W)
5. (24.10.2024) EA7 Emporio Armani Milan - Anadolu Efes : 84 - 96 (W)
6. (29.10.2024) Anadolu Efes - FC Barcelona : 88 - 97 (L)
7. (31.10.2024) ALBA Berlin - Anadolu Efes : 70 - 86 (W)
8. (08.11.2024) Anadolu Efes - AS Monaco : 69 - 81 (L)
9. (12.11.2024) Baskonia Vitoria Gasteiz - Anadolu Efes : 84 - 89 (W)
10. (14.11.2024) Real Madrid - Anadolu Efes : 64 - 74 (W)
11. (21.11.2024) Anadolu Efes - Paris Basketbol : 84 - 93 (L)
12. (29.11.2024) LDLC Asvel Villeurbanne - Anadolu Efes : 97 - 82 (L)
13. (03.12.2024) Anadolu Efes - Bayern München : 101 - 90 (W)
14. (05.12.2024) Zalgiris Kaunas - Anadolu Efes : 85 - 72 (L)
15. (13.12.2024) Anadolu Efes - Panathinaikos Aktor : 93 - 67 (W)
16. (18.12.2024) Anadolu Efes - Crvena Zvezda Meridianbet : 89 - 67 (W)
17. (20.12.2024) Anadolu Efes - Partizan Mozzart Bet : 86 - 77 (W)
18. (26.12.2024) AS Monaco - Anadolu Efes : 94 - 75 (L)
19. (03.01.2025) Fenerbahçe Beko - Anadolu Efes : 84 - 76 (L)
20. (10.01.2025) Anadolu Efes - LDLC Asvel Villeurbanne : 76 - 82 (L)
21. (14.01.2025) Paris Basket - Anadolu Efes : 88 - 84 (L)
22. (17.01.2025) FC Barcelona - Anadolu Efes : 90 - 80 (L)
23. (23.01.2025) Anadolu Efes - EA7 Emporio Armani Milan : 110 - 66 (W)
24. (31.01.2025) Pire Olympiacos - Anadolu Efes : 92 - 89 (L)
25. (04.02.2025) Anadolu Efes - Real Madrid : 79 - 73 (W)
26. (06.02.2025) Panathinaikos Aktor - Anadolu Efes : 104 - 89 (L)
27. (28.02.2025) Anadolu Efes - Alba Berlin : 98 - 73 (W)
28. (07.03.2025) Anadolu Efes - Virtus Segafredo Bologna : 89 - 68 (W)
29. (14.03.2025) Bayern München - Anadolu Efes : 92 - 97 (W)
30. (21.03.2025) Partizan Mozzart Bet - Anadolu Efes : 65 - 97 (W)
31. (26.03.2025) Anadolu Efes - Baskonia Vitoria-Gasteiz : 92 - 76 (W)
32. (28.03.2025) Anadolu Efes - Maccabi Playtika Tel Aviv : 90 - 88 (W)
33. (04.04.2025) Crvena Zvezda - Anadolu Efes : 96 - 97 (W) (uz)
34. (11.04.2025) Anadolu Efes - Zalgiris Kaunas : 87 - 77 (W)

Quarterfinal:

1. (22.04.2025) Panathinaikos Aktor - Anadolu Efes : 87 - 83 (L)
2. (24.04.2025) Panathinaikos Aktor - Anadolu Efes : 76 - 79 (W)
3. (30.04.2025) Anadolu Efes - Panathinaikos Aktor : 77 - 81 (L)
4. (02.05.2025) Anadolu Efes - Panathinaikos Aktor : 85 - 82 (W)
5. (06.05.2025) Panathinaikos Aktor - Anadolu Efes : 75 - 67 (L)

== 2025-26 EuroLeague ==
Regular season: (finished 19th in group with 12-26)

1. (30.09.2025) Anadolu Efes - Maccabi Rapyd Tel Aviv : 85 - 78 (W)
2. (03.10.2025) Anadolu Efes - Hapoel IBI Tel Aviv : 81 - 87 (L)
3. (09.10.2025) Partizan Mozzart Bet - Anadolu Efes : 93 - 87 (L)
4. (14.10.2025) Pire Olympiacos - Anadolu Efes : 72 - 82 (W)
5. (17.10.2025) Anadolu Efes - Panathinaikos Aktor : 81 - 95 (L)
6. (24.10.2025) Anadolu Efes - Fenerbahçe Beko : 69 - 79 (L)
7. (28.10.2025) Paris Basket - Anadolu Efes : 80 - 90 (W)
8. (31.10.2025) Kosner Baskonia Vitoria Gasteiz - Anadolu Efes : 86 - 75 (L)
9. (07.11.2025) Anadolu Efes - EA7 Emporio Armani Milan : 93 - 97 (L)
10. (11.11.2025) Virtus Bologna - Anadolu Efes : 99 - 89 (L)
11. (14.11.2025) Anadolu Efes - FC Bayern München : 74 - 72 (W)
12. (20.11.2025) Anadolu Efes - FC Barcelona : 73 - 72 (W)
13. (26.11.2025) AS Monaco - Anadolu Efes : 102 - 66 (L)
14. (04.12.2025) Anadolu Efes - Real Madrid : 75 - 81 (L)
15. (11.12.2025) Valencia Basket - Anadolu Efes : 94 - 82 (L)
16. (17.12.2025) Zalgiris Kaunas - Anadolu Efes : 64 - 87 (W)
17. (19.12.2025) Anadolu Efes - Dubai Basket : 76 - 80 (L)
18. (23.12.2025) LDLC Asvel Villeurbanne - Anadolu Efes : 109 - 99 (L) (uz)
19. (02.01.2026) Anadolu Efes - Crvena Zvezda Meridianbet : 65 - 87 (L)
20. (07.01.2026) Anadolu Efes - Paris Basketball : 79 - 84 (L)
21. (09.11.2026) EA7 Emporio Armani Milan - Anadolu Efes : 87 - 74 (L)
22. (15.01.2026) Anadolu Efes - Kosner Baskonia Vitoria Gasteiz : 75 - 89 (L)
23. (20.01.2026) Hapoel IBI Tel Aviv - Anadolu Efes : 71 - 66 (L)
24. (22.01.2026) Anadolu Efes - Pire Olympiacos : 68 - 74 (L)
25. (29.01.2026) Fenerbahçe Beko - Anadolu Efes : 79 - 62 (L)
26. (03.02.2026) Anadolu Efes - Valencia Basket: 107 - 90 (W)
27. (06.02.2026) Anadolu Efes - Zalgiris Kaunas: 92 - 82 (W)
28. (12.02.2026) Anadolu Efes - Virtus Bologna : 91 - 60 (W)
29. (22.02.2026) Crvena Zvezda Meridianbet - Anadolu Efes : 91 - 81 (L)
30. (06.03.2026) Anadolu Efes - Asvel Lyon : 88 - 91 (L)
31. (12.03.2026) FC Bayern München - Anadolu Efes : 80 - 81 (W)
32. (19.03.2026) Anadolu Efes - AS Monaco : 93 - 98 (L)
33. (24.02.2026) FC Barcelona - Anadolu Efes : 78 - 71 (L)
34. (26.02.2026) Real Madrid - Anadolu Efes : 91 - 82 (L)
35. (01.04.2026) Maccabi Rapyd Tel Aviv - Anadolu Efes : 103 - 89 (L)
36. (08.04.2026) Anadolu Efes - Partizan Mozartbet Belgrad : 79 - 72 (W)
37. (10.04.2026) Dubai Basket - Anadolu Efes : 69 - 85 (W)
38. (17.04.2026) Panathinaikos Aktor Athens - Anadolu Efes : 97 - 62 (L)
