= Hapoel Galil Elyon =

Basketball team in Israel

Hapoel Galil Elion
- Leagues: Israeli Basketball Premier League; Balkan League
- Founded: 1972; 54 years ago
- History: Hapoel Kfar Giladi (1972-1978); Hapoel Galil Elyon (1978–2008, 2009–present)
- Arena: Heihal HaPais
- Capacity: 2,200
- Location: Kfar Blum, Israel
- Team colors: Red and white
- President: Nir Wasserman
- Head coach: Idan Avshalom
- Team captain: Nimrod Levi
- Championships: 1 Israeli Championship; 2 Israeli State Cups; 1 Balkan International Basketball League
Home	Away

Hapoel Galil Elyon (Hebrew: הפועל גליל עליון), also known as Hapoel Nofar Energy Galil Elion for sponsorship reasons, is an Israeli basketball club. The team competes in the Israeli Basketball Premier League, the top tier of Israeli basketball, and internationally in the Balkan League. The team represents the northern region of the country – the Upper Galilee, and the Golan Heights.

In June 2008, the club rights in the Israeli Basketball Premier League transferred to Hapoel Gilboa (which had previously been merged with Hapoel Afula, which regained their independence) to form a new club, Hapoel Gilboa Galil, which represents the Gilboa and Lower Galilee regions. The team was re-established in 2009.

== History ==
American-Israeli Brad Leaf played for 12 years for Hapoel Galil Elyon. He won the Israeli Basketball Premier League MVP award in 1989–90. In both 1989-90 and 1991-92 he was voted a member of the Israeli Basketball Premier League Quintet, an award given to the five best players of each season of the Israeli Basketball Premier League.

In 1992–93 the club, then coached by Pini Gershon, became the first club based outside Tel Aviv to win the Israeli Championship, ending Maccabi Tel Aviv's 23-year winning streak. They also won the State Cup twice, in 1988 and 1992.

Between 1990 and 2008, several of the Israel's most successful basketball players came through the club, including Nadav Henefeld, Oded Kattash, Doron Sheffer, Gur Shelef, Lior Eliyahu, and Sharon Sasson, earning the team the nickname "the Israeli basketball college".

In 2021, the club was promoted from the Israeli National League to the Israeli Basketball Premier League for the first time since the merger.

== Honors ==
Total titles: 4

=== Domestic competitions ===
- Israeli Championship

Winners: 1993
Runners-up: 1990, 1995

- State Cup

Winners: 1988, 1992
Runners-up: 1987, 1990, 1998

==== Lower division competitions ====
- Liga Artzit / Israeli National League (2nd)

Winners: 1979 (North Division), 2021

=== European competitions ===
- FIBA Saporta Cup

Semifinalist (1): 1992–93

==== Regional competitions ====
- Balkan League

Winners: 2022

== Players ==
=== Current roster ===
Note: Flags indicate national team eligibility at FIBA-sanctioned events. Players may hold other non-FIBA nationalities not displayed.

Hapoel Galil Elyon roster
Players
Coaches

Pos.	No.	Nat.	Name	Ht.	Age
F/C	1	(Guyana)	Langevine, Cyril	2.03 m (6 ft 8 in)	27 – 16 October 1998
G	2	(United States)	Blakes, Jaylen	1.88 m (6 ft 2 in)	23 – 7 April 2003
G	4	(United States)	Kingz, Nate	1.95 m (6 ft 5 in)	23 – 14 November 2002
G	5	(Israel)	Gordon, Ori	1.90 m (6 ft 3 in)	19 – 31 May 2007
G/F	6	(Israel)	Sahar, Dori	1.95 m (6 ft 5 in)	25 – 8 January 2001
G	7	(Israel)	Moskovits, Itay	1.92 m (6 ft 4 in)	26 – 31 March 2000
F	9	(United States)	Kemp, Maurice	2.03 m (6 ft 8 in)	35 – 2 February 1991
G/F	10	(Italy) (Israel)	Akrish, Noam	2.01 m (6 ft 7 in)	24 – 10 October 2001
G/F	12	(Israel)	Melamed, Yahel	1.99 m (6 ft 6 in)	25 – 5 January 2001
F/C	21	(Israel)	Ben-Dar, Ron	2.05 m (6 ft 9 in)	19 – 26 February 2007
G	22	(Israel)	Elmishli, Yoav	1.90 m (6 ft 3 in)	18 – 22 November 2007
G	23	(United States)	Douglas, Toney	1.89 m (6 ft 2 in)	40 – 16 March 1986
G	24	(Israel)	Feldman, Itay	1.90 m (6 ft 3 in)	18 – 14 August 2008
F	34	(United States)	Brooks, Max	2.06 m (6 ft 9 in)	25 – 6 January 2001
F/C	41	(Israel)	Anavi, Dor	2.03 m (6 ft 8 in)	25 – 14 July 2001

Head coach

- (Israel) Idan Avshalom

Assistant coach(es)

- (Israel) Avishai Gordon
- (Israel) Liam Acharkan
- (Israel) Itamar Roitman

Legend

- (C) Team captain
- Injured

- Roster
Updated: August 10, 2026

=== Depth chart ===
Pos.	Starting 5	Bench 1	Bench 2
C	Cyril Langevine	Dor Anavi	Ron Ben-Dar
PF	Maurice Kemp	Max Brooks	Dori Sahar
SF	Noam Akrish	Yahel Melamed	Yoav Elmishli
SG	Nate Kingz	Itay Moskovits	Itay Feldman
PG	Jaylen Blakes	Toney Douglas	Ori Gordon

- The Israeli League rule requires every team to have at least one Israeli on the court at any time.
- There should be at least 7 Israelis and up to 5 foreigners on a 12-men game sheet.

Source: basket.co.il

== Season by season ==
Season	Tier	League	Pos.	Postseason	Cup Competitions	European Competitions	
2012–13	2	Liga Leumit					
2013–14	2	Liga Leumit			Second round		
2014–15	2	Liga Leumit			First round		
2015–16	2	Liga Leumit					
2016–17	2	Liga Leumit			First round		
2017–18	2	Liga Leumit	6	Quarter-finals	First round		
2018–19	2	Liga Leumit	3	Runner-up			
2019–20	2	Liga Leumit	7	7th place	Round of 16		
2020–21	2	Liga Leumit	1	Champion	First round		
2021–22	1	Premier League	5	Quarter-finals	Quarter-finals	Balkan League	Champion
2022–23	1	Premier League	5	Quarter-finals	—	4 Europe Cup	Regular season
2023–24	1	Premier League	11	—	First round	4 Europe Cup	Withdrew
2024–25	1	Premier League	10	Play-in	—		

== Notable players ==
Note: Flags indicate national team eligibility at FIBA-sanctioned events. Players may hold other non-FIBA nationalities not displayed.

Criteria

To appear in this section a player must have either:

- Set a club record or won an individual award while at the club
- Played at least one official international match for their national team at any time
- Played at least one official NBA match at any time.

- (Australia) Jo Lual-Acuil
- (Croatia) Teo Čizmić
- (Croatia) Pero Dujmović
- (Israel) Ilan Berkovich
- (Israel) Omri Casspi
- (Israel) Lior Eliyahu
- (Israel) Avishai Gordon
- (Israel) Or Goren
- (Israel) Erez Hazan
- (Israel) Nadav Henefeld
- (Israel) Oded Kattash
- (Israel) Ido Kozikaro
- (Israel) Yogev Ohayon
- (Israel) Barak Peleg
- (Israel) Yoav Saffar
- (Israel) Sharon Sasson
- (Israel) Doron Sheffer
- (Israel) Gil Sela
- (Israel) Gur Shelef
- (Israel) Alon Stein
- (Jamaica) Andrew Kennedy
- (Lithuania) Evaldas Jocys
- (Lithuania) Rimantas Kaukėnas
- (Nigeria) Kenny Adeleke
- (Puerto Rico) Christian Dalmau
- (Serbia) Saša Bratić
- (Serbia) Ivan Krasić
- (United States) (Israel) Jamie Arnold
- (United States) (Israel) Mark Brisker
- (United States) (Israel) Brad Leaf
- (United States) (Israel) Steve Malovic
- (United States) (Israel) Jerry Simon
- (United States) Demetrius Alexander
- (United States) Michael Ansley
- (United States) Darren Daye
- (United States) Mike Gibson
- (United States) Sam Hoskin
- (United States) Randell Jackson
- (United States) Mike James
- (United States) Lamont Jones
- (United States) Rashad Madden
- (United States) Chester Simmons
- (United States) Jawad Williams
- (Israel) Shamuel Nachmias

== Notable coaches ==
- (United States) (Israel) David Blatt
- (Israel) Pini Gershon
- (Israel) Oded Kattash
- (Israel) Erez Edelstein
- (Israel) Muli Katzurin
