= 2014–15 Euroleague squads =

This article contains the rosters of teams that played in the 2014–15 Euroleague basketball tournament.

== Notes ==
All squads as of 22 December 2014.

Note: Flags indicate national team eligibility at FIBA-sanctioned events. Players may hold other non-FIBA nationalities not displayed.

== Real Madrid ==
Real Madrid Baloncesto roster
Players
Coaches

Pos.	No.	Nat.	Name	Ht.	Wt.	Age
F/C	14	(Mexico)	Ayón, Gustavo	2.08 m (6 ft 10 in)	113 kg (249 lb)	41 – 1 April 1985
C	30	(Greece)	Bourousis, Ioannis	2.13 m (7 ft 0 in)	122 kg (269 lb)	42 – 17 November 1983
PG	7	(Argentina)	Campazzo, Facundo	1.79 m (5 ft 10 in)	88 kg (194 lb)	35 – 23 March 1991
SG	20	(Azerbaijan)	Carroll, Jaycee	1.88 m (6 ft 2 in)	77 kg (170 lb)	43 – 16 April 1983
G/F	5	(Spain)	Fernández, Rudy	1.98 m (6 ft 6 in)	84 kg (185 lb)	41 – 4 April 1985
G	23	(Spain)	Llull, Sergio	1.92 m (6 ft 4 in)	95.4 kg (210 lb)	38 – 15 November 1987
SF	8	(Lithuania)	Mačiulis, Jonas	2.01 m (6 ft 7 in)	107 kg (236 lb)	41 – 10 February 1985
C	50	(Tunisia)	Mejri, Salah	2.17 m (7 ft 1 in)	111 kg (245 lb)	39 – 15 June 1986
F	6	(Argentina)	Nocioni, Andrés	2.01 m (6 ft 7 in)	102 kg (225 lb)	46 – 30 November 1979
PF	9	(Spain)	Reyes, Felipe (C)	2.06 m (6 ft 9 in)	118 kg (260 lb)	46 – 16 March 1980
SG	4	(United States)	Rivers, K. C.	1.98 m (6 ft 6 in)	100 kg (220 lb)	39 – 1 March 1987
PG	13	(Spain)	Rodríguez, Sergio	1.91 m (6 ft 3 in)	80 kg (176 lb)	39 – 12 June 1986
F/C	44	(United States)	Slaughter, Marcus	2.03 m (6 ft 8 in)	104.5 kg (230 lb)	41 – 18 March 1985

Head coach

- (Spain) Pablo Laso

Assistant coach(es)

- (Croatia) Žan Tabak
- (Spain) Chus Mateo

Legend

- (C) Team captain
- Injured

- Roster
Updated: September 23, 2014

== Anadolu Efes ==
Anadolu Efes roster
Players
Coaches

Pos.	No.	Nat.	Name	Ht.	Wt.	Age
PG	4	(Turkey)	Balbay, Doğuş	1.85 m (6 ft 1 in)	85 kg (187 lb)	37 – 21 January 1989
SG	5	(Ireland)	McGrath, Donnie	1.93 m (6 ft 4 in)	88 kg (194 lb)	41 – 7 May 1984
G/F	6	(Turkey)	Osman, Cedi	2.06 m (6 ft 9 in)	88 kg (194 lb)	30 – 4 August 1995
SF	7	(Greece)	Perperoglou, Stratos	2.03 m (6 ft 8 in)	104 kg (229 lb)	41 – 7 August 1984
G	8	(Turkey)	Batuk, Birkan	1.96 m (6 ft 5 in)	87 kg (192 lb)	36 – 30 January 1990
PF	9	(Croatia)	Šarić, Dario	2.08 m (6 ft 10 in)	104 kg (229 lb)	32 – 8 April 1994
PG	10	(Croatia)	Draper, Dontaye	1.80 m (5 ft 11 in)	82 kg (181 lb)	41 – 10 August 1984
F/C	12	(Serbia)	Krstić, Nenad	2.13 m (7 ft 0 in)	121 kg (267 lb)	42 – 25 July 1983
F/C	13	(Gabon)	Lasme, Stephane	2.03 m (6 ft 8 in)	98 kg (216 lb)	43 – 17 December 1982
G/F	17	(Turkey)	Akyol, Cenk	2.00 m (6 ft 7 in)	94 kg (207 lb)	39 – 16 April 1987
SG	18	(Turkey)	Coşar, Efekan	1.92 m (6 ft 4 in)		32 – 7 February 1994
G/F	21	(Turkey)	Ulubay, Okben	2.01 m (6 ft 7 in)	86 kg (190 lb)	29 – 25 May 1996
F	22	(Turkey)	Korkmaz, Furkan	1.98 m (6 ft 6 in)	77 kg (170 lb)	28 – 24 July 1997
G	23	(United States)	Janning, Matt	1.97 m (6 ft 6 in)	88 kg (194 lb)	37 – 22 June 1988
F	32	(Turkey)	Kılıçlı, Deniz	2.06 m (6 ft 9 in)	129 kg (284 lb)	35 – 23 October 1990
C	41	(Turkey)	Koşut, Emircan	2.16 m (7 ft 1 in)	98 kg (216 lb)	30 – 3 July 1995
F/C	51	(Montenegro)	Bjelica, Milko	2.07 m (6 ft 9 in)	102 kg (225 lb)	41 – 4 June 1984

Head coach

- (Serbia) Dušan Ivković

Assistant coach(es)

- (Greece) Vangelis Angelou
- (Turkey) Ahmet Çakı
- (Croatia) Tomislav Mijatović
- (Serbia) Djordje Adzic

Team manager

- (Turkey) Engin Özerhun

Legend

- (C) Team captain
- Injured

- Roster
Updated: October 20, 2014

== Žalgiris ==
BC Žalgiris roster
Players
Coaches

Pos.	No.	Nat.	Name	Ht.	Wt.	Age
PG	1	(United States)	Cherry, Will	1.85 m (6 ft 1 in)	80 kg (176 lb)	35 – 8 February 1991
PG	4	(Lithuania)	Lekavičius, Lukas	1.83 m (6 ft 0 in)	76 kg (168 lb)	32 – 30 March 1994
F	5	(Estonia)	Vene, Siim-Sander	2.03 m (6 ft 8 in)	97 kg (214 lb)	35 – 12 November 1990
F/C	7	(Lithuania)	Gudaitis, Artūras	2.08 m (6 ft 10 in)	115 kg (254 lb)	32 – 19 June 1993
PG	8	(Lithuania)	Kariniauskas, Vaidas	1.97 m (6 ft 6 in)	92 kg (203 lb)	32 – 16 November 1993
F/C	9	(Lithuania)	Songaila, Darius	2.06 m (6 ft 9 in)	112 kg (247 lb)	48 – 14 February 1978
SF	10	(Lithuania)	Lipkevičius, Vytenis	1.98 m (6 ft 6 in)	98 kg (216 lb)	36 – 19 May 1989
PF	13	(Lithuania)	Jankūnas, Paulius (C)	2.05 m (6 ft 9 in)	107 kg (236 lb)	42 – 29 April 1984
C	15	(Lithuania)	Javtokas, Robertas	2.11 m (6 ft 11 in)	117 kg (258 lb)	46 – 20 March 1980
G	20	(Latvia)	Vecvagars, Kaspars	1.93 m (6 ft 4 in)	83 kg (183 lb)	32 – 3 August 1993
G/F	21	(Lithuania)	Milaknis, Artūras	1.95 m (6 ft 5 in)	90 kg (198 lb)	39 – 16 June 1986
G/F	23	(United States)	Anderson, James	1.98 m (6 ft 6 in)	97.4 kg (215 lb)	37 – 25 March 1989
PF	27	(Lithuania)	Tarolis, Donatas	2.02 m (6 ft 8 in)	91 kg (201 lb)	32 – 30 April 1994
SG	33	(Lithuania)	Dimša, Tomas	1.95 m (6 ft 5 in)	88 kg (194 lb)	32 – 2 January 1994
SF	92	(Lithuania)	Ulanovas, Edgaras	1.98 m (6 ft 6 in)	94 kg (207 lb)	34 – 7 January 1992

Head coach

- (Lithuania) Gintaras Krapikas

Assistant coach(es)

- (Lithuania) Šarūnas Jasikevičius
- (Lithuania) Evaldas Beržininkaitis

Athletic trainer(s)

- (Lithuania) Nerijus Navickas
- (Lithuania) Justinas Grainys

Physiotherapist(s)

- (Lithuania) Paulius Jacikas

Team manager

- (Lithuania) Paulius Motiejūnas

Legend

- (C) Team captain
- Injured

- Roster
Updated: October 13, 2014

== Nizhny Novgorod ==
BC Nizhny Novgorod roster
Players
Coaches

Pos.	No.	Nat.	Name	Ht.	Wt.	Age
G	4	(Russia)	Baburin, Evgeni	1.90 m (6 ft 3 in)	95 kg (209 lb)	38 – 4 July 1987
SF	7	(Russia)	Viktorov, Ivan	1.96 m (6 ft 5 in)	89 kg (196 lb)	30 – 1 November 1995
C	9	(Belarus)	Parakhouski, Artsiom	2.11 m (6 ft 11 in)	122 kg (269 lb)	38 – 6 October 1987
SF	10	(Russia)	Ivlev, Vladimir	2.07 m (6 ft 9 in)	90 kg (198 lb)	36 – 28 February 1990
F	11	(Russia)	Antonov, Semyon	2.02 m (6 ft 8 in)	104 kg (229 lb)	36 – 18 July 1989
SF	12	(Georgia (country))	Patsatsia, Levan	1.98 m (6 ft 6 in)	86 kg (190 lb)	37 – 24 September 1988
PG	13	(Russia)	Khvostov, Dmitry Grigoryevich	1.91 m (6 ft 3 in)	78 kg (172 lb)	36 – 21 August 1989
F	20	(Russia)	Popov, Iliya	2.08 m (6 ft 10 in)	113 kg (249 lb)	31 – 4 April 1995
SF	21	(United States)	Kinsey, Tarence	2.00 m (6 ft 7 in)	86 kg (190 lb)	42 – 21 March 1984
PG	22	(Montenegro)	Rochestie, Taylor (injured)	1.85 m (6 ft 1 in)	88 kg (194 lb)	40 – 1 July 1985
PG	23	(Russia)	Savelyev, Ivan	1.90 m (6 ft 3 in)	90 kg (198 lb)	38 – 14 July 1987
C	31	(Russia)	Krivosheev, Maxim	2.03 m (6 ft 8 in)	100 kg (220 lb)	37 – 17 August 1988
F	33	(United States)	Thompkins, Trey	2.08 m (6 ft 10 in)	111 kg (245 lb)	35 – 29 May 1990
F	55	(Russia)	Golovin, Dmitry	1.92 m (6 ft 4 in)	82 kg (181 lb)	37 – 14 July 1988

Head coach

- (Latvia) Ainars Bagatskis

Assistant coach(es)

- (Latvia) Artūrs Štālbergs

Legend

- (C) Team captain
- Injured

- Roster
Updated: June 6, 2014

== UNICS Kazan ==
BC UNICS Kazan roster
Players
Coaches

Pos.	No.	Nat.	Name	Ht.	Wt.	Age
SG	4	(United States)	White, James	2.01 m (6 ft 7 in)	98 kg (216 lb)	43 – 21 October 1982
SG	5	(United States)	Langford, Keith	1.93 m (6 ft 4 in)	90 kg (198 lb)	42 – 15 September 1983
G	6	(Greece)	Zisis, Nikolaos	1.97 m (6 ft 6 in)	98 kg (216 lb)	42 – 16 August 1983
G	10	(Russia)	Bykov, Sergei	1.90 m (6 ft 3 in)	92 kg (203 lb)	43 – 26 February 1983
SF	11	(Russia)	Likhodey, Valery	2.04 m (6 ft 8 in)	100 kg (220 lb)	39 – 23 October 1986
F	12	(Russia)	Panin, Vadim	2.03 m (6 ft 8 in)	100 kg (220 lb)	42 – 10 February 1984
SF	13	(Georgia (country))	Sanikidze, Viktor	2.03 m (6 ft 8 in)	100 kg (220 lb)	40 – 1 April 1986
PF	15	(Russia)	Gubanov, Petr	2.07 m (6 ft 9 in)	105 kg (231 lb)	39 – 3 April 1987
C	20	(Russia)	Sokolov, Dmitri	2.14 m (7 ft 0 in)	102 kg (225 lb)	41 – 21 January 1985
F	21	(Greece)	Kaimakoglou, Kostas	2.06 m (6 ft 9 in)	113 kg (249 lb)	43 – 15 March 1983
F	22	(Russia)	Antipov, Pavel	2.02 m (6 ft 8 in)	96 kg (212 lb)	34 – 19 September 1991
G	33	(Russia)	Khabirov, Ruslan	1.92 m (6 ft 4 in)	89 kg (196 lb)	35 – 5 March 1991
C	40	(Israel)	Fischer, D'or	2.11 m (6 ft 11 in)	116 kg (256 lb)	44 – 12 October 1981
G	41	(Russia)	Valishaev, Kemal	2.03 m (6 ft 8 in)	93 kg (205 lb)	32 – 21 July 1993
PG	55	(United States)	Jerrells, Curtis	1.85 m (6 ft 1 in)	88 kg (194 lb)	39 – 5 February 1987

Head coach

- (Russia) Evgeniy Pashutin

Assistant coach(es)

- (Greece) Giorgos Vovoras
- (Russia) Alexandr Zryadchikov
- (Greece) Adamantis Panagiotopoulos

Team manager

- (Russia) Valery Kolesnikov

Legend

- (C) Team captain
- Injured

- Roster
Updated: October 1, 2014

== Dinamo Sassari ==
Dinamo Sassari roster
Players
Coaches

Pos.	No.	Nat.	Name	Ht.	Wt.	Age
G	4	(Dominican Republic)	Sosa, Edgar	1.90 m (6 ft 3 in)	80 kg (176 lb)	38 – 15 January 1988
G/F	5	(Italy)	Formenti, Matteo	1.94 m (6 ft 4 in)	90 kg (198 lb)	44 – 15 April 1982
G/F	7	(United States)	Sanders, Rakim	1.96 m (6 ft 5 in)	103 kg (227 lb)	36 – 8 July 1989
G/F	8	(Italy)	Devecchi, Giacomo	1.96 m (6 ft 5 in)	88 kg (194 lb)	41 – 2 April 1985
C	9	(Nigeria)	Lawal, Shane	2.08 m (6 ft 10 in)	104 kg (229 lb)	39 – 8 October 1986
G	10	(Italy)	Chessa, Massimo	1.88 m (6 ft 2 in)	80 kg (176 lb)	38 – 30 April 1988
G	11	(United States)	Dyson, Jerome	1.91 m (6 ft 3 in)	82 kg (181 lb)	39 – 1 May 1987
F	14	(Italy)	Sacchetti, Brian	2.00 m (6 ft 7 in)	100 kg (220 lb)	39 – 4 May 1986
F/C	18	(Italy)	Vanuzzo, Manuel (C)	2.03 m (6 ft 8 in)	104 kg (229 lb)	51 – 5 April 1975
F	21	(United States)	Brooks, Jeff	2.03 m (6 ft 8 in)	94 kg (207 lb)	36 – 12 June 1989
F/C	22	(Bosnia and Herzegovina)	Todić, Miroslav	2.05 m (6 ft 9 in)	110 kg (243 lb)	41 – 6 January 1985
G	3	(Poland)	Logan, David	1.85 m (6 ft 1 in)	77 kg (170 lb)	43 – 26 December 1982

Head coach

- (Italy) Romeo Sacchetti

Assistant coach(es)

- (Italy) Paolo Citrini
- (Italy) Massimo Maffezzoli

Legend

- (C) Team captain
- Injured

- Roster
Updated: November 20, 2014

== CSKA Moscow ==
PBC CSKA Moscow roster
Players
Coaches

Pos.	No.	Nat.	Name	Ht.	Wt.	Age
PG	1	(France)	de Colo, Nando	1.96 m (6 ft 5 in)	91 kg (201 lb)	38 – 23 June 1987
PG	4	(Serbia)	Teodosić, Miloš (injured)	1.95 m (6 ft 5 in)	87 kg (192 lb)	39 – 19 March 1987
SG	7	(Russia)	Fridzon, Vitaly	1.96 m (6 ft 5 in)	81 kg (179 lb)	40 – 14 October 1985
SF	8	(United States)	Nichols, Demetris	1.98 m (6 ft 6 in)	96 kg (212 lb)	41 – 4 September 1984
PG	9	(United States)	Jackson, Aaron	1.90 m (6 ft 3 in)	83 kg (183 lb)	39 – 6 May 1986
SG	11	(Georgia (country))	Markoishvili, Manuchar	1.96 m (6 ft 5 in)	91 kg (201 lb)	39 – 17 November 1986
C	12	(Russia)	Korobkov, Pavel	2.06 m (6 ft 9 in)	99 kg (218 lb)	36 – 18 October 1989
SF	13	(United States)	Weems, Sonny	1.98 m (6 ft 6 in)	93 kg (205 lb)	39 – 8 July 1986
SG	14	(Russia)	Zozulin, Aleksei (injured)	1.99 m (6 ft 6 in)	100 kg (220 lb)	43 – 14 January 1983
PG	19	(Russia)	Strebkov, Ivan	1.93 m (6 ft 4 in)	84 kg (185 lb)	34 – 27 July 1991
PF	20	(Russia)	Vorontsevich, Andrey	2.07 m (6 ft 9 in)	107 kg (236 lb)	38 – 17 July 1987
C	24	(Russia)	Kaun, Alexander	2.11 m (6 ft 11 in)	116 kg (256 lb)	40 – 8 May 1985
PF	31	(Russia)	Khryapa, Victor (injured) (C)	2.03 m (6 ft 8 in)	101 kg (223 lb)	43 – 3 August 1982
C	42	(United States)	Hines, Kyle	1.98 m (6 ft 6 in)	111 kg (245 lb)	39 – 2 September 1986

Head coach

- (Greece) Dimitrios Itoudis

Assistant coach(es)

- (United States) Darryl Middleton
- (Greece) Andreas Pistiolis
- (Russia) Anton Yudin

Athletic trainer(s)

- (Greece) Kostas Chatzichristos
- (Russia) Eugeniy Burin

Physiotherapist(s)

- (Russia) Asker Barcho

Team manager

- (Russia) Vasiliy Kozlovtsev

Legend

- (C) Team captain
- Injured

- Roster
Updated: October 2, 2014

== Maccabi Tel Aviv ==
Maccabi Tel Aviv BC roster
Players
Coaches

Pos.	No.	Nat.	Name	Ht.	Wt.	Age
PG	4	(United States)	Pargo, Jeremy	1.88 m (6 ft 2 in)	99 kg (218 lb)	40 – 17 March 1986
G	5	(United States)	Haynes, Marquez	1.91 m (6 ft 3 in)	84 kg (185 lb)	39 – 19 December 1986
G/F	6	(United States)	Smith, Devin	1.98 m (6 ft 6 in)	111 kg (245 lb)	43 – 12 April 1983
PF	7	(United States)	Randle, Brian	2.03 m (6 ft 8 in)	107 kg (236 lb)	41 – 8 February 1985
SF	8	(United States)	Linhart, Nate	2.01 m (6 ft 7 in)	98 kg (216 lb)	39 – 14 November 1986
F/C	9	(Israel)	Tyus, Alex	2.03 m (6 ft 8 in)	102 kg (225 lb)	38 – 8 January 1988
SF	10	(Israel)	Pnini, Guy (injured)	2.01 m (6 ft 7 in)	97 kg (214 lb)	42 – 4 September 1983
PF	11	(Israel)	Cohen, Jake	2.08 m (6 ft 10 in)	97 kg (214 lb)	35 – 25 September 1990
PG	12	(Israel)	Ohayon, Yogev (C)	1.89 m (6 ft 2 in)	86 kg (190 lb)	39 – 24 April 1987
PG	13	(Israel)	Leomi, Or	1.92 m (6 ft 4 in)	82 kg (181 lb)	29 – 25 October 1996
G	14	(Israel)	Harari, Arad	1.96 m (6 ft 5 in)	87 kg (192 lb)	31 – 23 September 1994
G	15	(Israel)	Landesberg, Sylven	1.98 m (6 ft 6 in)	94 kg (207 lb)	36 – 10 April 1990
C	21	(Greece)	Schortsanitis, Sofoklis	2.08 m (6 ft 10 in)	156 kg (344 lb)	40 – 22 June 1985
C	23	(Australia)	Marić, Aleks	2.11 m (6 ft 11 in)	125 kg (276 lb)	41 – 22 October 1984

Head coach

- (Israel) Guy Goodes

Assistant coach(es)

- (Israel) Pini Gershon
- (Israel) Alon Stein

Team manager

- (Croatia) Nikola Vujčić

Legend

- (C) Team captain
- Injured

- Roster
Updated: August 20, 2014

== Unicaja ==
Unicaja roster
Players
Coaches

Pos.	No.	Nat.	Name	Ht.	Wt.	Age
C	32	(Montenegro)	Golubović, Vladimir	2.12 m (6 ft 11 in)	113 kg (249 lb)	40 – 24 February 1986
PG	15	(Uruguay)	Granger, Jayson	1.89 m (6 ft 2 in)	82 kg (181 lb)	36 – 15 September 1989
PF	30	(United States)	Green, Caleb	2.03 m (6 ft 8 in)	108 kg (238 lb)	40 – 7 October 1985
SF	19	(Lithuania)	Kuzminskas, Mindaugas	2.05 m (6 ft 9 in)	98 kg (216 lb)	36 – 19 October 1989
PG	4	(Serbia)	Marković, Stefan	1.99 m (6 ft 6 in)	98 kg (216 lb)	38 – 25 April 1988
C	11	(Senegal)	Nguirane, Maodo	2.10 m (6 ft 11 in)	105 kg (231 lb)	32 – 10 November 1993
SG	20	(Iceland)	Stefánsson, Jón Arnór	1.95 m (6 ft 5 in)	92 kg (203 lb)	43 – 21 September 1982
SF	12	(Spain)	Suárez, Carlos	2.03 m (6 ft 8 in)	106 kg (234 lb)	39 – 23 May 1986
PF	10	(Georgia (country))	Thomas, Will	2.03 m (6 ft 8 in)	104 kg (229 lb)	39 – 1 July 1986
SG	9	(United States)	Toolson, Ryan	1.93 m (6 ft 4 in)	90 kg (198 lb)	41 – 21 March 1985
SF	7	(Greece)	Vasileiadis, Kostas	2.01 m (6 ft 7 in)	102 kg (225 lb)	42 – 15 March 1984
C	17	(Spain)	Vázquez, Fran (C)	2.09 m (6 ft 10 in)	109 kg (240 lb)	43 – 1 May 1983

Head coach

- (Spain) Joan Plaza

Assistant coach(es)

- (Spain) Antonio Herrera
- (Spain) Ángel Sánchez-Cañete
- (Spain) Carlos Jiménez

Legend

- (C) Team captain
- Injured

- Roster
Updated: September 26, 2014

== Alba Berlin ==
Alba Berlin roster
Players
Coaches

Pos.	No.	Nat.	Name	Ht.	Wt.	Age
SG	5	(Germany)	Giffey, Niels	2.01 m (6 ft 7 in)	93 kg (205 lb)	34 – 9 June 1991
SF	7	(Germany)	King, Alex	2.00 m (6 ft 7 in)	103 kg (227 lb)	41 – 20 February 1985
PG	8	(Germany)	Akpinar, Ismet	1.90 m (6 ft 3 in)	80 kg (176 lb)	30 – 22 May 1995
G	9	(Belgium)	Tabu, Jonathan (injured)	1.90 m (6 ft 3 in)	88 kg (194 lb)	40 – 7 October 1985
G	11	(Germany)	Vargas, Akeem	1.92 m (6 ft 4 in)	90 kg (198 lb)	36 – 29 April 1990
PF	13	(Croatia)	Banić, Marko	2.06 m (6 ft 9 in)	113 kg (249 lb)	41 – 31 August 1984
SF	15	(United States)	Redding, Reggie	1.96 m (6 ft 5 in)	95 kg (209 lb)	37 – 18 July 1988
C	18	(Germany)	Wohlfarth-Bottermann, Jonas (injured)	2.08 m (6 ft 10 in)	100 kg (220 lb)	36 – 20 February 1990
G	19	(North Macedonia)	Stojanovski, Vojdan	1.94 m (6 ft 4 in)	87 kg (192 lb)	38 – 9 December 1987
PG	20	(United States)	Renfroe, Alex	1.91 m (6 ft 3 in)	80 kg (176 lb)	39 – 23 May 1986
C	22	(Germany)	Seiferth, Martin (injured)	2.08 m (6 ft 10 in)	104 kg (229 lb)	35 – 18 September 1990
PG	25	(United States)	Hammonds, Cliff	1.91 m (6 ft 3 in)	91 kg (201 lb)	40 – 18 December 1985
PF	33	(United States)	McLean, Jamel	2.03 m (6 ft 8 in)	104 kg (229 lb)	38 – 18 April 1988
C	43	(Croatia)	Radošević, Leon	2.09 m (6 ft 10 in)	102 kg (225 lb)	36 – 26 February 1990

Head coach

- (Serbia) Saša Obradović

Assistant coach(es)

- (Serbia) Milenko Bogićević
- (Germany) Mauricio Parra

Legend

- (C) Team captain
- Injured

- Roster
Updated: December 17, 2014

== Cedevita Zagreb ==
KK Cedevita roster
Players
Coaches

Pos.	No.	Nat.	Name	Ht.	Wt.	Age
G/F	4	(Croatia)	Mazalin, Lovro	2.04 m (6 ft 8 in)	88 kg (194 lb)	28 – 28 June 1997
F	5	(Croatia)	Zubčić, Tomislav	2.12 m (6 ft 11 in)	96 kg (212 lb)	36 – 17 January 1990
F	7	(Croatia)	Ramljak, Ivan	2.03 m (6 ft 8 in)	92 kg (203 lb)	35 – 9 August 1990
G/F	8	(Croatia)	Pilepić, Fran	1.94 m (6 ft 4 in)	85 kg (187 lb)	36 – 5 May 1989
F	9	(Croatia)	Babić, Luka (C)	2.01 m (6 ft 7 in)	92 kg (203 lb)	34 – 29 September 1991
G	10	(Croatia)	Delaš, Ante	2.00 m (6 ft 7 in)	82 kg (181 lb)	38 – 11 March 1988
F/C	11	(Croatia)	Žganec, Karlo	2.06 m (6 ft 9 in)	102 kg (225 lb)	30 – 25 July 1995
C	15	(Croatia)	Bilan, Miro	2.13 m (7 ft 0 in)	102 kg (225 lb)	36 – 21 July 1989
F	17	(Croatia)	Delaš, Mario	2.07 m (6 ft 9 in)	98 kg (216 lb)	36 – 16 January 1990
G	20	(Bosnia and Herzegovina)	Gordić, Nemanja	1.93 m (6 ft 4 in)	90 kg (198 lb)	37 – 25 September 1988
G	32	(Croatia)	Ukić, Roko Leni	1.96 m (6 ft 5 in)	86 kg (190 lb)	41 – 5 December 1984
G/F	33	(Croatia)	Tomas, Marko (injured)	2.01 m (6 ft 7 in)	95 kg (209 lb)	41 – 3 January 1985
C	34	(Croatia)	Lončar, Markus	2.11 m (6 ft 11 in)	100 kg (220 lb)	30 – 8 April 1996
F/C	35	(Croatia)	Arapović, Marko	2.07 m (6 ft 9 in)	105 kg (231 lb)	29 – 20 July 1996
G/F	44	(Croatia)	Vučić, Ivan	1.97 m (6 ft 6 in)		29 – 28 October 1996

Head coach

- (Croatia) Jasmin Repeša

Assistant coach(es)

- (Croatia) Veljko Mršić
- (Croatia) Dražen Orešković
- (Croatia) Dino Repeša

Strength & conditioning coach(es)

- (Croatia) Slaven Hlupić

Physiotherapist(s)

- (Croatia) Petar Leko
- (Croatia) Slaven Durlen

Team manager

- (Croatia) Mate Skelin

Legend

- (C) Team captain
- Injured

- Roster
Updated: December 12, 2014

== Limoges CSP ==
Limoges CSP roster
Players
Coaches

Pos.	No.	Nat.	Name	Ht.	Wt.	Age
PG	1	(France)	Tchicamboud, Steed	1.93 m (6 ft 4 in)		44 – 18 June 1981
SG	5	(United States)	Smith, Jamar	1.91 m (6 ft 3 in)		39 – 7 April 1987
PG	9	(France)	Westermann, Leo	1.98 m (6 ft 6 in)		33 – 24 July 1992
PF	12	(France)	Camara, Ousmane	2.02 m (6 ft 8 in)		36 – 12 May 1989
C	13	(Brazil)	Batista, J.P.	2.06 m (6 ft 9 in)		44 – 29 October 1981
SG	17	(Ivory Coast)	Amagou, Pape-Philippe	1.85 m (6 ft 1 in)		41 – 27 February 1985
PF	18	(France)	Moerman, Adrien	2.00 m (6 ft 7 in)		37 – 7 August 1988
SG	25	(United States)	Curry, Ramel	1.92 m (6 ft 4 in)		46 – 17 April 1980
SF	31	(United States)	Southerland, James	2.03 m (6 ft 8 in)		36 – 28 April 1990
SF	41	(France)	Boungou Colo, Nobel	2.02 m (6 ft 8 in)		38 – 26 April 1988
PF	44	(United States)	Plaisted, Trent	2.11 m (6 ft 11 in)		39 – 1 October 1986
C	55	(Burkina Faso)	Zerbo, Fréjus	2.08 m (6 ft 10 in)		37 – 2 April 1989

Head coach

- (France) Jean Marc Dupraz

Assistant coach(es)

- (France) Bertrand Parvaud

Legend

- (C) Team captain
- Injured

- Roster
Updated: August 5, 2014

== FC Barcelona ==
FC Barcelona Bàsquet roster
Players
Coaches

Pos.	No.	Nat.	Name	Ht.	Wt.	Age
SG	10	(Spain)	Abrines, Álex (injured)	1.98 m (6 ft 6 in)	86 kg (190 lb)	32 – 1 August 1993
PF	5	(United States)	Doellman, Justin	2.08 m (6 ft 10 in)	102 kg (225 lb)	41 – 3 February 1985
SF	20	(Sweden)	Eriksson, Marcus (injured)	2.00 m (6 ft 7 in)	89 kg (196 lb)	32 – 5 December 1993
G/F	8	(Croatia)	Hezonja, Mario	2.02 m (6 ft 8 in)	91 kg (201 lb)	31 – 25 February 1995
PG	9	(Brazil)	Huertas, Marcelinho	1.91 m (6 ft 3 in)	84 kg (185 lb)	42 – 25 May 1983
C	30	(Poland)	Lampe, Maciej	2.11 m (6 ft 11 in)	125 kg (276 lb)	41 – 5 February 1985
SF	34	(Slovenia)	Nachbar, Boštjan	2.07 m (6 ft 9 in)	102 kg (225 lb)	45 – 3 July 1980
SG	11	(Spain)	Navarro, Juan Carlos (injured) (C)	1.92 m (6 ft 4 in)	90.5 kg (200 lb)	45 – 13 June 1980
SG	24	(United States)	Oleson, Brad (injured)	1.91 m (6 ft 3 in)	90.5 kg (200 lb)	43 – 11 April 1983
C	21	(Germany)	Pleiß, Tibor	2.16 m (7 ft 1 in)	122 kg (269 lb)	36 – 2 November 1989
PG	13	(Czech Republic)	Satoranský, Tomáš	1.99 m (6 ft 6 in)	86 kg (190 lb)	34 – 30 October 1991
SF	23	(United States)	Thomas, Deshaun	2.01 m (6 ft 7 in)	98 kg (216 lb)	34 – 28 August 1991
C	44	(Croatia)	Tomić, Ante	2.18 m (7 ft 2 in)	120 kg (265 lb)	39 – 17 February 1987
G	25	(France)	Jackson, Edwin	1.91 m (6 ft 3 in)	91 kg (201 lb)	36 – 18 September 1989

Head coach

- (Spain) Xavier Pascual

Assistant coach(es)

- (Spain) Agustín Julbé
- (Spain) Iñigo Zorzano
- (Spain) David García

Legend

- (C) Team captain
- Injured

- Roster
Updated: 21 December 2014

== Fenerbahçe Ülker ==
Fenerbahçe Ülker roster
Players
Coaches

Pos.	No.	Nat.	Name	Ht.	Wt.	Age
CG	3	(Georgia (country))	Hickman, Ricky	1.89 m (6 ft 2 in)	88 kg (194 lb)	40 – 1 September 1985
PG	23	(Turkey)	Uğurlu, Berk	1.92 m (6 ft 4 in)	72 kg (159 lb)	30 – 27 April 1996
PG	25	(Turkey)	Sipahi, Kenan	1.97 m (6 ft 6 in)	85 kg (187 lb)	30 – 26 May 1995
CG	0	(United States)	Goudelock, Andrew	1.91 m (6 ft 3 in)	91 kg (201 lb)	37 – 7 December 1988
SG	10	(Turkey)	Mahmutoğlu, Melih	1.91 m (6 ft 3 in)	85 kg (187 lb)	35 – 12 May 1990
SG	13	(Serbia)	Bogdanović, Bogdan	1.98 m (6 ft 6 in)	93 kg (205 lb)	33 – 18 August 1992
G/F	15	(Turkey)	Çetin, Serhat	1.97 m (6 ft 6 in)	94 kg (207 lb)	40 – 23 February 1986
G/F	55	(Turkey)	Preldžić, Emir (C)	2.06 m (6 ft 9 in)	100 kg (220 lb)	38 – 6 September 1987
F	24	(Czech Republic)	Veselý, Jan	2.13 m (7 ft 0 in)	110 kg (243 lb)	36 – 24 April 1990
PF	8	(Serbia)	Bjelica, Nemanja	2.09 m (6 ft 10 in)	106 kg (234 lb)	37 – 9 May 1988
C	9	(Turkey)	Erden, Semih	2.13 m (7 ft 0 in)	109 kg (240 lb)	39 – 28 July 1986
C	14	(Turkey)	Yurtseven, Ömer	2.06 m (6 ft 9 in)		27 – 19 June 1998
C	21	(Turkey)	Savaş, Oğuz	2.13 m (7 ft 0 in)	132 kg (291 lb)	38 – 13 July 1987
C	22	(Croatia)	Žorić, Luka	2.11 m (6 ft 11 in)	110 kg (243 lb)	41 – 5 November 1984

Head coach

- (Serbia) Željko Obradović

Assistant coach(es)

- (Spain) José María Izquierdo Ibáñez
- (Serbia) Vladimir Androić
- (Turkey) Erdem Can

Athletic trainer(s)

- (Serbia) Predrag Zimonjić

Team manager

- (Italy) Maurizio Gherardini
- (Turkey) Ömer Onan

Legend

- (C) Team captain
- Injured

- Roster
Updated: November 26, 2014

== Panathinaikos ==
Panathinaikos B.C. roster
Players
Coaches

Pos.	No.	Nat.	Name	Ht.	Wt.	Age
SF	5	(Greece)	Charalampopoulos, Vasileios	2.03 m (6 ft 8 in)	106.5 kg (235 lb)	29 – 6 January 1997
SG	6	(United States)	Slaughter, A.J.	1.91 m (6 ft 3 in)	80 kg (176 lb)	38 – 3 August 1987
CG	7	(Greece)	Bochoridis, Lefteris	1.96 m (6 ft 5 in)	91 kg (201 lb)	32 – 18 April 1994
SF	8	(Greece)	Janković, Vlado	2.02 m (6 ft 8 in)	100 kg (220 lb)	36 – 3 March 1990
PF	9	(Greece)	Fotsis, Antonis	2.09 m (6 ft 10 in)	113.4 kg (250 lb)	45 – 1 April 1981
PG	10	(United States)	Nelson, DeMarcus (injured)	1.93 m (6 ft 4 in)	91 kg (201 lb)	40 – 2 November 1985
SG	11	(Greece)	Pappas, Nikos	1.95 m (6 ft 5 in)	97.5 kg (215 lb)	35 – 11 July 1990
F/C	12	(Greece)	Mavrokefalidis, Loukas	2.10 m (6 ft 11 in)	118 kg (260 lb)	41 – 25 July 1984
CG	13	(Greece)	Diamantidis, Dimitris (C)	1.96 m (6 ft 5 in)	100 kg (220 lb)	45 – 6 May 1980
PF	14	(United States)	Gist, James	2.06 m (6 ft 9 in)	106.5 kg (235 lb)	39 – 26 October 1986
C	15	(Uruguay)	Batista, Esteban	2.08 m (6 ft 10 in)	122 kg (269 lb)	42 – 2 September 1983
PG	16	(Greece)	Koniaris, Antonis	1.96 m (6 ft 5 in)	86 kg (190 lb)	28 – 30 September 1997
C	17	(Greece)	Diamantakos, Georgios	2.15 m (7 ft 1 in)	124.6 kg (275 lb)	31 – 14 January 1995
SG	18	(Latvia)	Blūms, Jānis	1.91 m (6 ft 3 in)	86 kg (190 lb)	44 – 20 April 1982
C	19	(Greece)	Papagiannis, Georgios	2.17 m (7 ft 1 in)	125 kg (276 lb)	28 – 3 July 1997
F/C	21	(United States)	Wright, Julian	2.03 m (6 ft 8 in)	100.5 kg (222 lb)	38 – 20 May 1987

Head coach

- (Montenegro) Duško Ivanović

Assistant coach(es)

- (Spain) Josep Maria Berrocal
- (Greece) Sotiris Manolopoulos
- (Greece) Nikos Pappas

Athletic trainer(s)

- (Greece) Savvas Aronis

Legend

- (C) Team captain
- Injured

- Roster
Updated: October 5, 2014

== EA7 Emporio Armani Milano ==
Olimpia Milano roster
Players
Coaches

Pos.	No.	Nat.	Name	Ht.	Wt.	Age
G	1	(United States)	Ragland, Joe	1.82 m (6 ft 0 in)	80 kg (176 lb)	36 – 11 November 1989
G/F	2	(United States)	Brooks, MarShon	1.96 m (6 ft 5 in)	91 kg (201 lb)	37 – 26 January 1989
G/F	5	(Italy)	Gentile, Alessandro	2.00 m (6 ft 7 in)	104 kg (229 lb)	33 – 12 November 1992
F/C	6	(Italy)	Gigli, Angelo	2.09 m (6 ft 10 in)	104 kg (229 lb)	42 – 4 June 1983
G	7	(Italy)	Cerella, Bruno	1.94 m (6 ft 4 in)	93 kg (205 lb)	39 – 30 July 1986
PF	9	(Italy)	Melli, Nicolò	2.05 m (6 ft 9 in)	106.5 kg (235 lb)	35 – 26 January 1991
G	10	(United States)	Meacham, Trenton	1.88 m (6 ft 2 in)	88 kg (194 lb)	40 – 26 September 1985
F	11	(Lithuania)	Kleiza, Linas	2.03 m (6 ft 8 in)	107 kg (236 lb)	41 – 3 January 1985
C	21	(United States)	James, Shawn	2.08 m (6 ft 10 in)	102 kg (225 lb)	42 – 10 September 1983
G	23	(Italy)	Hackett, Daniel	1.98 m (6 ft 6 in)	95 kg (209 lb)	38 – 19 December 1987
C	24	(Jamaica)	Samuels, Samardo (injured)	2.06 m (6 ft 9 in)	118 kg (260 lb)	37 – 9 January 1989
G/F	34	(United States)	Moss, David	1.96 m (6 ft 5 in)	100 kg (220 lb)	42 – 9 September 1983

Head coach

- (Italy) Luca Banchi

Assistant coach(es)

- (Italy) Mario Fioretti
- (Italy) Massimo Cancellieri

Athletic trainer(s)

- (Italy) Giustino Danesi

Legend

- (C) Team captain
- Injured

- Roster
Updated: August 20, 2014

== FC Bayern Munich ==
FC Bayern Munich roster
Players
Coaches

Pos.	No.	Nat.	Name	Ht.	Wt.	Age
PG	4	(North Macedonia)	McCalebb, Bo	1.83 m (6 ft 0 in)	82 kg (181 lb)	40 – 4 May 1985
PG	8	(Germany)	Schaffartzik, Heiko	1.83 m (6 ft 0 in)	83 kg (183 lb)	42 – 3 January 1984
PG	9	(Serbia)	Micić, Vasilije (injured)	1.95 m (6 ft 5 in)	92 kg (203 lb)	32 – 13 January 1994
SG	10	(Germany)	Staiger, Lucca	1.96 m (6 ft 5 in)	93 kg (205 lb)	37 – 14 June 1988
SF	12	(Germany)	Benzing, Robin (injured)	2.08 m (6 ft 10 in)	101 kg (223 lb)	37 – 25 January 1989
SF	14	(Bosnia and Herzegovina)	Đedović, Nihad	1.96 m (6 ft 5 in)	86 kg (190 lb)	36 – 12 January 1990
C	15	(Serbia)	Štimac, Vladimir	2.11 m (6 ft 11 in)	116 kg (256 lb)	38 – 25 August 1987
G/F	16	(Germany)	Zipser, Paul	2.00 m (6 ft 7 in)	94 kg (207 lb)	32 – 18 February 1994
SG	17	(Germany)	Marin, Mauricio	1.92 m (6 ft 4 in)	80 kg (176 lb)	32 – 21 April 1994
PF	20	(Serbia)	Savanović, Duško	2.04 m (6 ft 8 in)	102 kg (225 lb)	42 – 5 September 1983
SG	25	(Slovakia)	Gavel, Anton	1.89 m (6 ft 2 in)	87 kg (192 lb)	41 – 24 October 1984
C	32	(Germany)	Idbihi, Yassin	2.08 m (6 ft 10 in)	107 kg (236 lb)	42 – 24 July 1983
C	41	(Germany)	Mayr, Daniel	2.16 m (7 ft 1 in)	96 kg (212 lb)	30 – 28 July 1995
SG	44	(United States)	Taylor, Bryce (C)	1.95 m (6 ft 5 in)	95 kg (209 lb)	39 – 27 September 1986
PF	45	(Germany)	Jagla, Jan	2.13 m (7 ft 0 in)	105 kg (231 lb)	44 – 25 June 1981
C	54	(United States)	Bryant, John	2.11 m (6 ft 11 in)	127 kg (280 lb)	38 – 13 June 1987

Head coach

- (Serbia) Svetislav Pešić

Assistant coach(es)

- (Bosnia and Herzegovina) Emir Mutapčić
- (Germany) Andreas Wagner

Athletic trainer(s)

- (Serbia) Jovan Buha

Team manager

- (Germany) Florian Högerl

Legend

- (C) Team captain
- Injured

- Roster
- Transactions
Updated: November 23, 2014

== PGE Turów ==
Turów Zgorzelec roster
Players
Coaches

Pos.	No.	Nat.	Name	Ht.	Wt.	Age
G/F	1	(United States)	Collins, Mardy	1.98 m (6 ft 6 in)	100 kg (220 lb)	41 – 4 August 1984
PF	7	(Poland)	Kulig, Damian	2.06 m (6 ft 9 in)	92 kg (203 lb)	38 – 23 June 1987
SG	8	(Poland)	Chylinski, Mychal	1.96 m (6 ft 5 in)		40 – 22 February 1986
SF	9	(Poland)	Karolak, Jakub	1.96 m (6 ft 5 in)		32 – 26 September 1993
SG	10	(Serbia)	Jaramaz, Nemanja	2.01 m (6 ft 7 in)	86 kg (190 lb)	34 – 10 July 1991
PG	11	(Poland)	Gospodarek, Michael	1.86 m (6 ft 1 in)		34 – 30 November 1991
G	12	(Poland)	Wiśniewski, Łukasz	1.89 m (6 ft 2 in)		41 – 7 December 1984
PF	13	(Poland)	Dylewicz, Filip	2.03 m (6 ft 8 in)	100 kg (220 lb)	46 – 25 January 1980
PF	14	(Romania)	Moldoveanu, Vlad	2.06 m (6 ft 9 in)	101 kg (223 lb)	38 – 11 February 1988
SF	17	(Poland)	Jyż, Bartosz	1.97 m (6 ft 6 in)		28 – 26 September 1997
PF	19	(Serbia)	Nikolić, Uroš	2.08 m (6 ft 10 in)	94 kg (207 lb)	39 – 25 April 1987
PG	21	(United States)	Taylor, Tony	1.85 m (6 ft 1 in)	87 kg (192 lb)	35 – 9 August 1990
SF	31	(Poland)	Kostrzewski, Mateusz (injured)	2.01 m (6 ft 7 in)	83 kg (183 lb)	36 – 18 September 1989
F	33	(United States)	Wright, Chris	2.03 m (6 ft 8 in)	102 kg (225 lb)	37 – 30 September 1988
C	44	(Serbia)	Žigeranović, Ivan	2.12 m (6 ft 11 in)	120 kg (265 lb)	41 – 14 August 1984

Head coach

- (Serbia) Miodrag Rajković

Assistant coach(es)

- (Poland) Edward Żak
- (Poland) Piotr Ignatowicz

Physiotherapist(s)

- (Poland) Maciej Żmijewski

Team manager

- (Poland) Grzegorz Ardeli

Legend

- (C) Team captain
- Injured

- Roster
Updated: November 6, 2014

== Olympiacos ==
Olympiacos B.C. roster
Players
Coaches

Pos.	No.	Nat.	Name	Ht.	Wt.	Age
PF	4	(United States)	Petway, Brent	2.05 m (6 ft 9 in)	102 kg (225 lb)	40 – 12 May 1985
C	5	(United States)	Hunter, Othello	2.03 m (6 ft 8 in)	106.5 kg (235 lb)	39 – 28 May 1986
C	6	(United States)	Dunston, Bryant	2.03 m (6 ft 8 in)	114.4 kg (252 lb)	39 – 28 May 1986
G	7	(Greece)	Spanoulis, Vassilis (C)	1.93 m (6 ft 4 in)	95.4 kg (210 lb)	43 – 7 August 1982
SF	9	(Greece)	Papapetrou, Ioannis (injured)	2.06 m (6 ft 9 in)	105.5 kg (233 lb)	32 – 30 March 1994
G	10	(Greece)	Sloukas, Kostas	1.90 m (6 ft 3 in)	95.4 kg (210 lb)	36 – 15 January 1990
G/F	14	(Greece)	Christodoulou, Antreas	1.97 m (6 ft 6 in)	100 kg (220 lb)	30 – 22 May 1995
PF	15	(Greece)	Printezis, Georgios (injured)	2.06 m (6 ft 9 in)	109 kg (240 lb)	41 – 22 February 1985
PF	16	(Greece)	Agravanis, Dimitrios	2.08 m (6 ft 10 in)	106.5 kg (235 lb)	31 – 20 December 1994
G	17	(Greece)	Mantzaris, Vangelis (injured)	1.96 m (6 ft 5 in)	95.4 kg (210 lb)	36 – 16 April 1990
C	18	(Greece)	Kavvadas, Vasileios	2.05 m (6 ft 9 in)	120 kg (265 lb)	34 – 28 December 1991
G	19	(Greece)	Katsivelis, Dimitrios	1.97 m (6 ft 6 in)	90.5 kg (200 lb)	34 – 1 October 1991
PG	20	(Croatia)	Lafayette, Oliver	1.88 m (6 ft 2 in)	86 kg (190 lb)	41 – 6 May 1984
G/F	21	(United States)	Darden, Tremmell	1.96 m (6 ft 5 in)	100 kg (220 lb)	44 – 17 November 1981
G	22	(Greece)	Mouratos, Vasileios	1.93 m (6 ft 4 in)	87 kg (192 lb)	28 – 24 November 1997
G/F	24	(Belgium)	Lojeski, Matt	1.98 m (6 ft 6 in)	90.5 kg (200 lb)	40 – 24 July 1985

Head coach

- (Greece) Ioannis Sfairopoulos

Assistant coach(es)

- (Serbia) Milan Tomić
- (Greece) Christos Marmarinos

Legend

- (C) Team captain
- Injured

- Roster
Updated: November 4, 2014

== Crvena zvezda ==
KK Crvena zvezda roster
Players
Coaches

Pos.	No.	Nat.	Name	Ht.	Wt.	Age
G	3	(United States)	Williams, Marcus	1.91 m (6 ft 3 in)	95 kg (209 lb)	40 – 3 December 1985
G	4	(Serbia)	Rebić, Nikola	1.88 m (6 ft 2 in)	80 kg (176 lb)	31 – 22 January 1995
F	5	(Serbia)	Čvorović, Nikola	2.01 m (6 ft 7 in)	95 kg (209 lb)	32 – 30 January 1994
G/F	6	(Serbia)	Dangubić, Nemanja	2.04 m (6 ft 8 in)	88 kg (194 lb)	33 – 13 April 1993
F	9	(Serbia)	Mitrović, Luka (C)	2.05 m (6 ft 9 in)	102 kg (225 lb)	33 – 21 March 1993
G/F	10	(Serbia)	Lazić, Branko	1.95 m (6 ft 5 in)	87 kg (192 lb)	37 – 12 January 1989
G/F	11	(Slovenia)	Blažič, Jaka	1.96 m (6 ft 5 in)	96 kg (212 lb)	35 – 30 June 1990
F	12	(Serbia)	Kalinić, Nikola	2.02 m (6 ft 8 in)	101 kg (223 lb)	34 – 8 November 1991
C	13	(Serbia)	Marjanović, Boban	2.23 m (7 ft 4 in)	133 kg (293 lb)	37 – 15 August 1988
F/C	14	(Serbia)	Kaplanović, Đorđe	2.09 m (6 ft 10 in)	100 kg (220 lb)	31 – 21 March 1995
F/C	15	(Serbia)	Tejić, Marko	2.10 m (6 ft 11 in)	105 kg (231 lb)	30 – 4 August 1995
G	22	(United States)	Jenkins, Charles	1.91 m (6 ft 3 in)	95 kg (209 lb)	37 – 28 February 1989
G	24	(Serbia)	Jović, Stefan	1.98 m (6 ft 6 in)	94 kg (207 lb)	35 – 3 November 1990
C	33	(Germany)	Zirbes, Maik	2.08 m (6 ft 10 in)	115 kg (254 lb)	36 – 29 January 1990

Head coach

- (Montenegro) Dejan Radonjić

Assistant coach(es)

- (Montenegro) Borko Radović
- (Serbia) Saša Kosović
- (Serbia) Nikola Birač

Strength & conditioning coach(es)

- (Montenegro) Dragan Gačević

Physiotherapist(s)

- (Serbia) Milorad Ćirić

Team manager

- (Serbia) Nebojša Ilić

Legend

- (C) Team captain
- Injured

- Roster
Updated: October 10, 2014

== Laboral Kutxa ==
Laboral Kutxa Vitoria roster
Players
Coaches

Pos.	No.	Nat.	Name	Ht.	Wt.	Age
PG	1	(United States)	Adams, Darius	1.83 m (6 ft 0 in)	75 kg (165 lb)	37 – 17 April 1989
PG	3	(United States) (Guinea-Bissau)	James, Mike	1.85 m (6 ft 1 in)	84 kg (185 lb)	35 – 18 August 1990
C	4	(United States) (Guinea-Bissau)	Iverson, Colton	2.13 m (7 ft 0 in)	116 kg (256 lb)	36 – 29 June 1989
SG	5	(France)	Causeur, Fabien	1.93 m (6 ft 4 in)	90 kg (198 lb)	38 – 16 June 1987
PF	7	(Georgia (country))	Shengelia, Tornike	2.06 m (6 ft 9 in)	109 kg (240 lb)	34 – 5 October 1991
PF	10	(Senegal) (Spain)	Diop, Mamadou	2.04 m (6 ft 8 in)	95 kg (209 lb)	33 – 14 February 1993
C	12	(Senegal) (Spain)	Diop, Ilimane	2.11 m (6 ft 11 in)	98 kg (216 lb)	31 – 4 April 1995
PF	14	(France)	Tillie, Kim	2.11 m (6 ft 11 in)	105 kg (231 lb)	37 – 15 July 1988
C	15	(Bosnia and Herzegovina) (Slovenia)	Begić, Mirza	2.21 m (7 ft 3 in)	120 kg (265 lb)	40 – 9 July 1985
SF	19	(Spain)	San Emeterio, Fernando (C)	1.99 m (6 ft 6 in)	105.4 kg (232 lb)	42 – 1 January 1984
SG	23	(United States)	Hansbrough, Ben	1.91 m (6 ft 3 in)	92 kg (203 lb)	38 – 23 December 1987
F	42	(Latvia)	Bertāns, Dāvis	2.08 m (6 ft 10 in)	95 kg (209 lb)	33 – 12 November 1992

Head coach

- (Spain) Ibon Navarro

Assistant coach(es)

- (Spain) José Ramón Cuspinera
- (Spain) David Gil

Legend

- (C) Team captain
- Injured

- Roster
Updated: December 30, 2014

== Galatasaray ==
Galatasaray Liv Hospital Istanbul roster
Players
Coaches

Pos.	No.	Nat.	Name	Ht.	Wt.	Age
F/C	4	(United States)	Young, Patric	2.09 m (6 ft 10 in)	109 kg (240 lb)	34 – 1 February 1992
G/F	5	(Serbia)	Micov, Vladimir	2.02 m (6 ft 8 in)	101 kg (223 lb)	41 – 16 April 1985
F/C	7	(Serbia)	Erceg, Zoran	2.11 m (6 ft 11 in)	112 kg (247 lb)	41 – 11 January 1985
PF	12	(Turkey)	Gönlüm, Kerem	2.08 m (6 ft 10 in)	102 kg (225 lb)	48 – 22 November 1977
SG	17	(Lithuania)	Pocius, Martynas	1.96 m (6 ft 5 in)	86 kg (190 lb)	40 – 28 April 1986
PG	20	(Turkey)	Nikolov, Kristijan	1.88 m (6 ft 2 in)	88 kg (194 lb)	29 – 15 October 1996
PG	30	(Puerto Rico)	Arroyo, Carlos (C)	1.88 m (6 ft 2 in)	84 kg (185 lb)	46 – 30 July 1979
SG	32	(Turkey)	Güler, Sinan	1.92 m (6 ft 4 in)	95 kg (209 lb)	42 – 8 November 1983
PG	33	(Turkey)	Arslan, Ender	1.90 m (6 ft 3 in)	82 kg (181 lb)	43 – 13 January 1983
F	34	(Turkey)	Arar, Ege	2.07 m (6 ft 9 in)	103 kg (227 lb)	29 – 2 September 1996
G	35	(Turkey)	Ural, Göktürk Gökalp	1.98 m (6 ft 6 in)	87 kg (192 lb)	30 – 31 May 1995

Head coach

- (Turkey) Ergin Ataman

Assistant coach(es)

- (Turkey) Yağızer Uluğ
- (Turkey) Yakup Sekizkök

Strength & conditioning coach(es)

- (Turkey) Adnan Bağriaçik
- (Turkey) Semih Eroğlu

Team manager

- (Turkey) Murat Özyer

Legend

- (C) Team captain
- Injured

- Roster
Updated: July 17, 2014

== Neptūnas ==
BC Neptūnas roster
Players
Coaches

Pos.	No.	Nat.	Name	Ht.	Wt.	Age
G	7	(Lithuania)	Mažeika, Martynas (C)	1.92 m (6 ft 4 in)	95 kg (209 lb)	41 – 29 January 1985
PG	8	(Lithuania)	Girdžiūnas, Mindaugas	1.89 m (6 ft 2 in)	86 kg (190 lb)	37 – 20 January 1989
SF	9	(Lithuania)	Nacius, Raidas	1.96 m (6 ft 5 in)	95 kg (209 lb)	34 – 30 December 1991
F	10	(Lithuania)	Sinica, Justas	2.03 m (6 ft 8 in)	92 kg (203 lb)	40 – 31 May 1985
PF	12	(Lithuania)	Dimša, Egidijus	2.04 m (6 ft 8 in)	95 kg (209 lb)	41 – 1 April 1985
G/F	13	(Lithuania)	Gailius, Deividas	2.00 m (6 ft 7 in)	92 kg (203 lb)	38 – 26 April 1988
F/C	15	(Lithuania)	Šarakauskas, Vytautas	2.04 m (6 ft 8 in)	108 kg (238 lb)	44 – 8 February 1982
C	21	(Lithuania)	Galdikas, Simas	2.05 m (6 ft 9 in)	118 kg (260 lb)	39 – 3 January 1987
PG	22	(United States)	Shakur, Mustafa	1.91 m (6 ft 3 in)	86 kg (190 lb)	41 – 18 August 1984
C	34	(United States)	Benson, Keith	2.11 m (6 ft 11 in)	107 kg (236 lb)	37 – 13 August 1988
F	41	(Lithuania)	Zavackas, Donatas	2.03 m (6 ft 8 in)	109 kg (240 lb)	46 – 23 April 1980
F	42	(Lithuania)	Vasylius, Valdas	2.02 m (6 ft 8 in)	102 kg (225 lb)	42 – 3 September 1983
G/F	51	(Lithuania)	Butkevičius, Arnas	1.96 m (6 ft 5 in)	92 kg (203 lb)	33 – 22 October 1992

Head coach

- (Lithuania) Kazys Maksvytis

Assistant coach(es)

- (Lithuania) Tomas Rinkevičius
- (Lithuania) Vilius Stanišausas

Athletic trainer(s)

- (Lithuania) Benas Kentra

Physiotherapist(s)

- (Lithuania) Giedrius Sabaliauskas

Team manager

- (Lithuania) Osvaldas Kurauskas

Legend

- (C) Team captain
- Injured

- Roster
Updated: September 8, 2014

== Valencia ==
Valencia BC roster
Players
Coaches

Pos.	No.	Nat.	Name	Ht.	Wt.	Age
PF	34	(Spain)	Aguilar, Pablo	2.03 m (6 ft 8 in)	97 kg (214 lb)	36 – 2 September 1989
PF	14	(Montenegro)	Dubljević, Bojan	2.05 m (6 ft 9 in)	111 kg (245 lb)	34 – 24 October 1991
F	44	(United States)	Harangody, Luke	2.03 m (6 ft 8 in)	109 kg (240 lb)	38 – 2 January 1988
C	12	(Ukraine)	Lishchuk, Sergei (injured)	2.10 m (6 ft 11 in)	110 kg (243 lb)	44 – 31 March 1982
PF	25	(Croatia)	Lončar, Krešimir	2.10 m (6 ft 11 in)	114 kg (251 lb)	43 – 12 February 1983
SF	13	(Serbia)	Lučić, Vladimir	2.02 m (6 ft 8 in)	91 kg (201 lb)	36 – 17 June 1989
SG	17	(Spain)	Martínez, Rafa	1.86 m (6 ft 1 in)	77 kg (170 lb)	44 – 3 March 1982
SG	8	(Serbia)	Nedović, Nemanja	1.91 m (6 ft 3 in)	87 kg (192 lb)	34 – 16 June 1991
SG	5	(Spain)	Ribas, Pau	1.96 m (6 ft 5 in)	95 kg (209 lb)	39 – 2 March 1987
G/F	10	(Central African Republic)	Sato, Romain	1.95 m (6 ft 5 in)	101 kg (223 lb)	45 – 2 March 1981
G	9	(Belgium)	van Rossom, Sam (injured)	1.88 m (6 ft 2 in)	85 kg (187 lb)	39 – 3 June 1986
G	16	(Spain)	Vives, Guillem	1.91 m (6 ft 3 in)	85 kg (187 lb)	32 – 16 September 1993

Head coach

- (Croatia) Velimir Perasović

Assistant coach(es)

- (Spain) Chechu Mulero
- (Spain) Juanjo Rojo

Legend

- (C) Team captain
- Injured

- Roster
Updated: 22 December 2014
