= 2013–14 Eurocup Basketball Knockout Stage =

The 2013–14 Eurocup Basketball Knockout stage was the last phase in the competition. Eight-finals started on March 4 and the Finals were played on May 1–7.

All times are CET (UTC+1).

== Round of 16 ==
The eight-finals were two-legged ties determined on aggregate score. The first legs were played on March 4–5 and return legs were played on March 11–12. The group winner in each tie, listed as "Team #1", hosted the second leg.

Team #1	Agg.	Team #2	1st leg	2nd leg
JSF Nanterre (France)	153–162	(Ukraine) BC Budivelnyk Kyiv	82–86	71–76
Aykon TED Ankara (Turkey)	143–135	(Ukraine) Khimik Yuzhny	71–75	72–60
BC Khimki (Russia)	156–157	(Spain) Valencia BC	59–75	97–82
Nizhny Novgorod (Russia)	166–159	(Turkey) Beşiktaş İntegral Forex	71–88	95–71
Hapoel Jerusalem (Israel)	168–154	(Germany) Ratiopharm Ulm	87–89	81–65
Alba Berlin (Germany)	187–176	(Italy) Banco di Sardegna Sassari	91–83	96–93
Unics Kazan (Russia)	167–117	(Czech Republic) ČEZ Nymburk	91–58	76–59
Lietuvos Rytas (Lithuania)	164–168	(Serbia) Crvena Zvezda	82–88	82–80

=== Game 1 ===
4 March 2014
18:00

Boxscore

BC Budivelnyk Kyiv (Ukraine)	86–82	(France) JSF Nanterre
Scoring by quarter: 21–19, 26–22, 19–20, 20–21
Pts: Lavrinovič 28; Rebs: Lavrinovič 9 Asts: Strēlnieks 7		Pts: Thomas 21; Rebs: Passave 10; Asts: Lighty 6

Žalgiris Arena, Kaunas
Attendance: 4,500
Referees: Murat Biricik (TUR), Sinisa Herceg (CRO), Apostolos Kalpakas (SWE)

4 March 2014
19:00

Boxscore

Beşiktaş İntegral Forex (Turkey)	88–71	(Russia) Nizhny Novgorod
Scoring by quarter: 18–6, 16–29, 23–17, 31–19
Pts: Lofton 28; Rebs: Perkins 7 Asts: Yağmur 6		Pts: Rochestie 22; Rebs: Antonov 10; Asts: Rochestie 8

BJK Akatlar Arena, Istanbul
Attendance: 2,780
Referees: Miguel Angel Perez Niz (ESP), Roberto Chiari (ITA), Carlos Cortes (ESP)

5 March 2014
17:00

Boxscore

Khimik Yuzhny (Ukraine)	75–71	(Turkey) Aykon TED Ankara
Scoring by quarter: 15–23, 23–16, 21–13, 16–19
Pts: Travis 19; Rebs: Travis 9 Asts: Gatens 4		Pts: Golubović, Tucker 18; Rebs: Golubović 11; Asts: Valters 7

Abdi İpekçi Arena, Istanbul
Attendance: 400
Referees: Vicente Bulto (ESP), Sasa Maricic (SRB), Igor Dragojevic (MNE)

5 March 2014
18:30

Boxscore

ČEZ Nymburk (Czech Republic)	58–91	(Russia) Unics Kazan
Scoring by quarter: 15–20, 20–26, 12–21, 11–24
Pts: Simmons 17; Rebs: Simmons 4 Asts: Welsch 4		Pts: Goudelock 36; Rebs: three players 4 Asts: Kaimakoglou 4

Sportovní Centrum, Nymburk
Attendance: 700
Referees: Jose Ramon Garcia Ortiz (ESP), Rustu Nuran (TUR), Gianluca Mattioli (ITA)

5 March 2014
19:30

Boxscore

Ratiopharm Ulm (Germany)	89–87	(Israel) Hapoel Jerusalem
Scoring by quarter: 22–27, 21–23, 21–19, 25–18
Pts: Sosa 19; Rebs: Howard 10; Asts: Günther 4		Pts: Duncan 22; Rebs: Parakhouski 8 Asts: Kitchen 6

Ratiopharm Arena, Neu-Ulm
Attendance: 5,000
Referees: Recep Ankarali (TUR), Tomas Jasevicius (LTU), Petri Mantyla (FIN)

5 March 2014
19:30

Boxscore

Crvena Zvezda (Serbia)	88–82	(Lithuania) Lietuvos Rytas
Scoring by quarter: 23–27, 22–14, 25–19, 18–22
Pts: Marjanović 21; Rebs: three players 5 Asts: Nelson 5		Pts: Seibutis 21; Rebs: Orelik 6 Asts: Cook 6

Pionir Hall, Belgrade
Attendance: 6,148
Referees: Emilio Perez Pizarro (ESP), Jakub Zamojski (POL), Ioannis Foufis (GRE)

5 March 2014
20:30

Boxscore

Banco di Sardegna Sassari (Italy)	83–91	(Germany) Alba Berlin
Scoring by quarter: 22–30, 18–17, 24–22, 19–22
Pts: Green 19; Rebs: Gordon 11; Asts: T. Diener 8		Pts: Radošević 24; Rebs: Redding, Radošević 6 Asts: Hammonds 5

Palasport Roberta Serradimigni, Sassari
Attendance: 4,480
Referees: Juan Carlos Garcia Gonzalez (ESP), Panagiotis Anastopoulos (GRE), Milos Koljensic (MNE)

5 March 2014
20:45

Boxscore

Valencia BC (Spain)	75–59	(Russia) BC Khimki
Scoring by quarter: 28–12, 8–10, 19–20, 20–17
Pts: Lafayette 16; Rebs: Sato, Martínez 7 Asts: Doellman, Martínez 4		Pts: Three players 11; Rebs: Lončar 7 Asts: Three players 3

Pabellón Fuente San Luis, Valencia
Attendance: 8,200
Referees: Luigi Lamonica (ITA), Milija Vojinovic (SRB), Tomasz Trawicki (POL)

=== Game 2 ===
11 March 2014
20:00

Boxscore

Alba Berlin (Germany)	96–93	(Italy) Banco di Sardegna Sassari
Scoring by quarter: 20–26, 19–19, 24–21, 33–27
Pts: Radošević 18; Rebs: Wohlfarth-Bottermann 7 Asts: Redding 6		Pts: Gordon 18; Rebs: Gordon 7 Asts: Diener 7

O2 World, Berlin
Attendance: 7,743
Referees: Christos Christodoulou (GRE), Boris Shulga (UKR), Miguel Angel Perez Niz (ESP)

11 March 2014
20:45

Boxscore

JSF Nanterre (France)	71–76	(Ukraine) BC Budivelnyk Kyiv
Scoring by quarter: 12–22, 18–17, 14–18, 27–19
Pts: Thomas 17; Rebs: Daniels 7 Asts: Lisch 4		Pts: Summers 18; Rebs: Lavrinovič 9 Asts: four players 2

Halle Georges Carpentier, Nanterre
Attendance: 4,800
Referees: Jose Ramon Garcia Ortiz (ESP), Tomasz Trawicki (POL), Carlos Cortes (ESP)

12 March 2014
16:00

Boxscore

Unics Kazan (Russia)	76–59	(Czech Republic) ČEZ Nymburk
Scoring by quarter: 20–21, 14–19, 17–9, 25–10
Pts: Goudelock 29; Rebs: Harangody, Kurbanov 8 Asts: three players 2		Pts: Pomikálek 11; Rebs: Pomikálek 10; Asts: Welsch 3

Basket Hall Arena, Kazan
Attendance: 2,000
Referees: Sreten Radovic (CRO), Milija Vojinovic (SRB), Sergiy Chebyshev (UKR)

12 March 2014
16:30

Boxscore

BC Khimki (Russia)	97–82	(Spain) Valencia BC
Scoring by quarter: 27–20, 20–19, 22–20, 28–23
Pts: Augustine, Popović 20; Rebs: Augustine 7 Asts: Green 8		Pts: Dubljević 23; Rebs: Sato 8 Asts: Lafayette 6

Basketball Center of Moscow Region, Moscow
Attendance: 2,500
Referees: Ilija Belosevic (SRB), Marek Cmikiewicz (POL), Olegs Latisevs (LAT)

12 March 2014
16:40

Boxscore

Nizhny Novgorod (Russia)	95–71	(Turkey) Beşiktaş İntegral Forex
Scoring by quarter: 15–8, 26–25, 24–16, 30–22
Pts: Panin, Rochestie 23; Rebs: Panin 9 Asts: Rochestie 7		Pts: Lofton 22; Rebs: Perkins 9 Asts: Perkins 5

Trade Union Sport Palace, Nizhny Novgorod
Attendance: 1,000
Referees: Vicente Bulto (ESP), Marko Juras (SRB), Benjamin Jimenez (ESP)

12 March 2014
18:00

Boxscore

Aykon TED Ankara (Turkey)	72–60	(Ukraine) Khimik Yuzhny
Scoring by quarter: 13-20, 21-15, 23-10, 15-15
Pts: Golubović 23; Rebs: Golubović 14; Asts: Tucker 7		Pts: Travis 14; Rebs: Delaney, Gatens 5 Asts: Delaney 9

Ankara Arena, Ankara
Attendance: 2,500
Referees: Milivoje Jovčić (SRB), Joseph Bissang (FRA), Petros Papapetrou (GRE)

12 March 2014
18:30

Boxscore

Hapoel Jerusalem (Israel)	81–65	(Germany) Ratiopharm Ulm
Scoring by quarter: 21-16, 25-16, 13-18, 22-15
Pts: Wright 21; Rebs: Kitchen 7 Asts: Kitchen 8		Pts: Howard 15; Rebs: Clyburn 7 Asts: Sosa 7

Malha Arena, Jerusalem
Attendance: 2,400
Referees: Saša Pukl (SLO), Saša Maričić (SRB), Ioannis Foufis (GRE)

12 March 2014
18:30

Boxscore

Lietuvos Rytas (Lithuania)	82–80	(Serbia) Crvena Zvezda
Scoring by quarter: 17-22, 25-27, 16-12, 24-19
Pts: Palacios, Seibutis 16; Rebs: Palacios 7 Asts: Seibutis 6		Pts: Katić 19; Rebs: Simonović 6 Asts: Nelson 5

Siemens Arena, Vilnius
Attendance: 5,350
Referees: Migueal Perez Perez (ESP), Antonio Conde (ESP), Gianluca Mattioli (ITA)

== Quarterfinals ==
The quarterfinals are two-legged ties determined on aggregate score. The first legs will be played on March 18–19 and return legs will be played on March 25–26. The team listed as "Team #1", hosts the second leg.

Team #1	Agg.	Team #2	1st leg	2nd leg
Crvena Zvezda (Serbia)	158–152	(Ukraine) BC Budivelnyk Kyiv	79–82	79–70
Unics Kazan (Russia)	167–120	(Turkey) Aykon TED Ankara	79–68	88–52
Alba Berlin (Germany)	132–159	(Spain) Valencia BC	54–86	78–73
Nizhny Novgorod (Russia)	166–153	(Israel) Hapoel Jerusalem	78–81	88–72

=== Game 1 ===
18 March 2014
19:30

Boxscore

BC Budivelnyk Kyiv (Ukraine)	82–79	(Serbia) Crvena Zvezda
Scoring by quarter: 22–16, 19–23, 25–19, 16–21
Pts: Strēlnieks 20; Rebs: Summers 10; Asts: Strēlnieks 5		Pts: Katić 20; Rebs: Radenović 7 Asts: Nelson 7

Žalgiris Arena, Kaunas
Attendance: 2,775
Referees: Juan Carlos Garcia Gonzalez (ESP), Grzegorz Ziemblicki (POL), Piotr Pastusiak (POL)

19 March 2014
18:00

Boxscore

Aykon TED Ankara (Turkey)	68–79	(Russia) Unics Kazan
Scoring by quarter: 20–21, 10–19, 14–20, 24–21
Pts: Tucker 23; Rebs: Golubović 9 Asts: Valters 6		Pts: Eidson 21; Rebs: Kaimakoglou 8 Asts: Goudelock 6

Ankara Arena, Ankara
Attendance: 1,000
Referees: Jose Martin (ESP), Srdan Dozai (CRO), Damir Javor (SLO)

19 March 2014
18:00

Boxscore

Valencia BC (Spain)	86–54	(Germany) Alba Berlin
Scoring by quarter: 22–17, 29–5, 22–15, 13–17
Pts: Doellman 33; Rebs: Sato 7 Asts: Lafayette 8		Pts: Logan 12; Rebs: King 5 Asts: three players 2

Pabellón Fuente San Luis, Valencia
Attendance: 8,100
Referees: Sasa Pukl (SLO), Nicola Maestre (FRA), Marcin Kowalski (POL)

19 March 2014
18:30

Boxscore

Hapoel Jerusalem (Israel)	81–78	(Russia) Nizhny Novgorod
Scoring by quarter: 21–22, 15–18, 21–16, 24–22
Pts: Parakhouski 18; Rebs: Parakhouski 8 Asts: Halperin 7		Pts: Brezec, Thompson 21; Rebs: Brezec, Thompson 8 Asts: Rochestie 6

Malha Arena, Jerusalem
Attendance: 2,200
Referees: Juan Carlos Arteaga (ESP), Spiros Gkontas (GRE), Petar Obradovic (BIH)

=== Game 2 ===
25 March 2014
20:00

Boxscore

Alba Berlin (Germany)	78–73	(Spain) Valencia BC
Scoring by quarter: 16–19, 17–17, 22–23, 23–14
Pts: Redding 24; Rebs: Kendall 10; Asts: Redding 7		Pts: Dubljević 14; Rebs: Doellman 6 Asts: Doellman, van Rossom 4

O2 World, Berlin
Attendance: 7,033
Referees: Fernando Rocha (POR), Paolo Taurino (ITA), Elias Koromilas (GRE)

26 March 2014
16:00

Boxscore

Unics Kazan (Russia)	88–52	(Turkey) Aykon TED Ankara
Scoring by quarter: 21–11, 22–22, 26–12, 19–7
Pts: Goudelock 21; Rebs: Kaimakoglou 11; Asts: Goudelock 6		Pts: Plisnić 13; Rebs: Plisnić 6 Asts: Tucker 6

Basket Hall Arena, Kazan
Attendance: 2,500
Referees: Miguel Perez Perez (ESP), Robert Vyklicky (CZE), Sergiy Zashchuk (UKR)

26 March 2014
16:40

Boxscore

Nizhny Novgorod (Russia)	88–72	(Israel) Hapoel Jerusalem
Scoring by quarter: 15–21, 25–16, 23–13, 25–22
Pts: Rochestie 18; Rebs: Thompson 13; Asts: Rochestie 6		Pts: Kitchen 15; Rebs: Kitchen 5 Asts: Halperin 4

Trade Union Sport Palace, Nizhny Novgorod
Attendance: 3,000
Referees: Robert Lottermoser (GER), Jakub Zamojski (POL), Murat Biricik (SLO)

26 March 2014
19:30

Boxscore

Crvena Zvezda (Serbia)	79–70 (OT)	(Ukraine) BC Budivelnyk Kyiv
Scoring by quarter: 11–15, 18–16, 10–11, 24–18, Overtime: 16–10
Pts: Jenkins 29; Rebs: Radenović 11; Asts: Nelson 2		Pts: Lavrinovič 17; Rebs: Lavrinovič 9 Asts: Ahearn, Strēlnieks 4

Kombank Arena, Belgrade
Attendance: 24,232
Referees: Dani Hierrezuelo (ESP), Carmelo Paternico (ITA), Oscar Perea (ESP)

== Semifinals ==
The semifinals are two-legged ties determined on aggregate score. The first legs will be played on April 1–2 and return legs will be played on April 9. The team listed as "Team #1", hosts the second leg.

Team #1	Agg.	Team #2	1st leg	2nd leg
Unics Kazan (Russia)	136–130	(Serbia) Crvena Zvezda	52–63	84–67
Nizhny Novgorod (Russia)	128–163	(Spain) Valencia BC	75–84	53–79

=== Game 1 ===
1 April 2014
20:45

Boxscore

Valencia BC (Spain)	84–75	(Russia) Nizhny Novgorod
Scoring by quarter: 20–23, 21–9, 22–17, 21–26
Pts: Dubljević 24; Rebs: Dubljević 12; Asts: Ribas 6		Pts: Thompson 25; Rebs: Thompson 8 Asts: Khvostov, Rochestie 4

Pabellón Fuente San Luis, Valencia
Attendance: 8,200
Referees: Luigi Lamonica (ITA), Grzegorz Ziemblicki (POL), Joseph Bissang (FRA)

2 April 2014
19:30

Boxscore

Crvena Zvezda (Serbia)	63–52	(Russia) Unics Kazan
Scoring by quarter: 15–18, 20–15, 15–15, 13–4
Pts: Blažič 15; Rebs: Dragićević 11; Asts: three players 2		Pts: Goudelock 18; Rebs: Kurbanov, Zisis 5 Asts: Eidson, Zisis 4

Kombank Arena, Belgrade
Attendance: 22,736
Referees: Robert Lottermoser (GER), Emilio Perez Pizarro (ESP), Rustu Nuran (TUR)

=== Game 2 ===
9 April 2014
17:00

Boxscore

Unics Kazan (Russia)	84–67	(Serbia) Crvena Zvezda
Scoring by quarter: 15–15, 27–21, 23–13, 19–18
Pts: Zisis 26; Rebs: Kaimakoglou 8 Asts: Goudelock 6		Pts: Marjanović 12; Rebs: Marjanović 11; Asts: Nelson 3

Basket Hall Arena, Kazan
Attendance: 5,000
Referees: Guerrino Cerebuch (ITA), Jose Ramon Garcia Ortiz (ESP), Panagiotis Anastopoulos (GRE)

9 April 2014
17:40

Boxscore

Nizhny Novgorod (Russia)	53–79	(Spain) Valencia BC
Scoring by quarter: 14–22, 11–17, 14–27, 14–13
Pts: Antonov, Korobkov 9 Rebs: Panin 7 Asts: Khvostov 3		Pts: Dubljević 13; Rebs: Sato 8 Asts: Doellman, Ribas 3

Trade Union Sport Palace, Nizhny Novgorod
Attendance: 4,500
Referees: Recep Ankarali (TUR), Matej Boltauzer (SLO), Eddie Viator (FRA)

== Finals ==
Team #1	Agg.	Team #2	1st leg	2nd leg
Valencia BC (Spain)	165–140	(Russia) Unics Kazan	80–67	73–85

=== Game 1 ===
1 May 2014
18:30

Boxscore

Valencia BC (Spain)	80–67	(Russia) Unics Kazan
Scoring by quarter: 27–12, 22–15, 25–17, 6–23
Pts: Doellman 28; Rebs: Doellman 6 Asts: Lafayette 7		Pts: Veremeenko 19; Rebs: Eidson 11; Asts: Eidson, Zisis 4

Pabellón Fuente San Luis, Valencia
Attendance: 8,500
Referees: Sreten Radovic (CRO), Tolga Sahin (ITA), Olegs Latisevs (LVA)

=== Game 2 ===
7 May 2014
17:00

Unics Kazan (Russia)	73–85	(Spain) Valencia BC
Scoring by quarter: 4–16, 21–23, 32–32, 16–14
Pts: Goudelock 22; Rebs: Eidson, Kurbanov 8 Asts: Eidson 4		Pts: Doellman 26; Rebs: Sato 7 Asts: Lafayette 6

Basket Hall Arena, Kazan
Attendance: 7,000
Referees: Luigi Lamonica (ITA), Recep Ankarali (TUR), Elias Koromilas (GRE)
