= Eurocup 2013–14 Regular Season Group F =

Standings and Results for Group F of the Regular Season phase of the 2013–14 Eurocup basketball tournament.

== Standings ==
	Team	Pld	W	L	PF	PA	Diff	Tie-break
1.	(Russia) BC Nizhny Novgorod	10	8	2	809	705	+104	
2.	(Ukraine) BC Khimik	10	6	4	786	732	+54	1–1 (+22)
3.	(Turkey) Aykon TED Ankara	10	6	4	788	774	+14	1–1 (–22)
4.	(Greece) PAOK	10	5	5	697	752	–55	
5.	(Montenegro) Budućnost VOLI Podgorica	10	3	7	772	802	–30	
6.	(Hungary) Bericap Alba Fehérvár	10	2	8	720	807	–87	

Source: Euroleague Basketball

== Fixtures and results ==
=== Game 1 ===
15 October 2013
20:00 CET

Boxscore

PAOK (Greece)	85–84	(Montenegro) Budućnost VOLI Podgorica
Scoring by quarter: 24–19, 10–19, 18–20, 33–26
Pts: Bogris 28; Rebs: Bogris 7 Asts: Cooper 8		Pts: Popović 22; Rebs: Akindele 12; Asts: Ćapin 4

P.A.O.K. Sports Arena, Thessaloniki
Attendance: 1,487
Referees: Robert Lottermoser (GER), Aleksandar Glisic (SRB), David Romano (ISR)

16 October 2013
17:30 CET

Boxscore

Aykon TED Ankara (Turkey)	60–84	(Ukraine) Khimik Yuzhne
Scoring by quarter: 18–19, 16–20, 21–23, 5–22
Pts: Golubović 23; Rebs: Golubović 10; Asts: Tucker 7		Pts: Travis 19; Rebs: Pustovyi 11; Asts: Delaney 5

Ankara Arena, Ankara
Attendance: 220
Referees: Petar Obradovic (BIH), Marius Ciulin (ROU), Omer Esteron (ISR)

16 October 2013
17:40 CET

Boxscore

BC Nizhny Novgorod (Russia)	82–64	(Hungary) Bericap Alba Fehérvár
Scoring by quarter: 24–18, 24–14, 20–20, 14–12
Pts: Panin 18; Rebs: Antonov 9 Asts: three players 4		Pts: Kemp, Moore 15; Rebs: Kemp 7 Asts: Hobbs 3

Trade Union Sport Palace, Nizhny Novgorod
Attendance: 700
Referees: Andrej Jersan (SLO), Jasmina Juras (SRB), Tomislav Hordov (CRO)

=== Game 2 ===
22 October 2013
19:30 CET

Boxscore

Budućnost VOLI Podgorica (Montenegro)	80–73	(Turkey) Aykon TED Ankara
Scoring by quarter: 25–20, 13–19, 22–13, 20–21
Pts: Šehović 21; Rebs: Deji 8 Asts: Ćapin 9		Pts: Golubović 25; Rebs: Golubović, Plisnić 6 Asts: Tucker 6

Morača Sports Center, Podgorica
Attendance: 2,500
Referees: Damir Javor (SLO), Piotr Pastusiak (POL), Alex Olaru (ROM)

23 October 2013
17:00 CET

Boxscore

Khimik Yuzhne (Ukraine)	78–76	(Russia) BC Nizhny Novgorod
Scoring by quarter: 20–25, 18–14, 23–15, 17–22
Pts: Shuler 18; Rebs: Travis 8 Asts: three players 4		Pts: Gubanov 21; Rebs: Panin 7 Asts: Khvostov 9

FSC Olymp, Yuzhne
Attendance: 1,600
Referees: Srdan Dozai (CRO), Ingus Baumanis (LAT), Josip Radojkovic (CRO)

23 October 2013
19:00 CET

Boxscore

Bericap Alba Fehérvár (Hungary)	88–89	(Greece) PAOK
Scoring by quarter: 16–13, 26–22, 25–29, 21–25
Pts: Kemp 26; Rebs: Kemp, Juhos 6 Asts: Juhos 4		Pts: Tsairelis 21; Rebs: Tsairelis 6 Asts: Tsairelis 5

Veszprém Aréna, Veszprém
Attendance: 1,500
Referees: Milivoje Jovcic (SRB), Gentian Cici (ALB), Milos Koljensic (MNE)

=== Game 3 ===
29 October 2013
19:00 CET

Boxscore

Bericap Alba Fehérvár (Hungary)	75–88	(Ukraine) Khimik Yuzhne
Scoring by quarter: 11–25, 22–18, 21–25, 21–20
Pts: Moore 20; Rebs: Somogyi 7 Asts: Supola 5		Pts: Delaney 24; Rebs: Travis 12; Asts: Delaney, Travis 5

Veszprém Aréna, Veszprém
Attendance: 2,200
Referees: Radomir Vojinovic (MNE), Tomislav Vovk (CRO), Uros Obrknezevic (SRB)

30 October 2013
16:40 CET

Boxscore

BC Nizhny Novgorod (Russia)	83–62	(Montenegro) Budućnost VOLI Podgorica
Scoring by quarter: 26–14, 21–22, 21–6, 15–20
Pts: Antonov 20; Rebs: Thompson 10; Asts: Panin 4		Pts: Mihailović 17; Rebs: Akindele 7 Asts: Popović 3

Trade Union Sport Palace, Nizhny Novgorod
Attendance: 1,700
Referees: Emin Mogulkoc (TUR), Miroslav Tomov (BUL), Clements Fritz (GER)

29 October 2013
19:00 CET

Boxscore

PAOK (Greece)	75–77	(Turkey) Aykon TED Ankara
Scoring by quarter: 31–19, 17–13, 13–20, 14–25
Pts: Charalampidis 20; Rebs: Cooper 7 Asts: Cooper 6		Pts: Golubović 23; Rebs: Golubović 10; Asts: Valters 4

P.A.O.K. Sports Arena, Thessaloniki
Attendance: 1,225
Referees: Paolo Taurino (ITA), Igor Dragojevic (MNE), Alexey Davydov (RUS)

=== Game 4 ===
6 November 2013
17:30 CET

Boxscore

Aykon TED Ankara (Turkey)	72–73	(Russia) BC Nizhny Novgorod
Scoring by quarter: 21–13, 20–23, 19–10, 12–27
Pts: Golubović 26; Rebs: Golubović 10; Asts: Valters 6		Pts: Brezec 26; Rebs: Panin 8 Asts: Antonov, Khvostov 4

Ankara Arena, Ankara
Attendance: 250
Referees: Eddie Viator (FRA), Carlos Peruga (ESP), David Romano (ISR)

6 November 2013
18:00 CET

Boxscore

PAOK (Greece)	77–69	(Ukraine) Khimik Yuzhne
Scoring by quarter: 22–18, 17–16, 15–12, 23–23
Pts: Payne 18; Rebs: Margaritis 9 Asts: Cooper 4		Pts: Delaney 19; Rebs: Shuler 7 Asts: Delaney, Shuler 4

P.A.O.K. Sports Arena, Thessaloniki
Attendance: 1,231
Referees: Grzegorz Ziemblicki (POL), Sasa Maricic (SRB), Saso Petek (SLO)

6 November 2013
18:30 CET

Boxscore

Budućnost VOLI Podgorica (Montenegro)	67–61	(Hungary) Bericap Alba Fehérvár
Scoring by quarter: 10–17, 29–14, 16–9, 12–21
Pts: Ćapin, Šehović 12; Rebs: Akindele 10; Asts: Ćapin, Vitkovac 3		Pts: Moore 12; Rebs: Somogyi, Tóth 6 Asts: Hobbs, Supola 3

Morača Sports Center, Podgorica
Attendance: 1,600
Referees: Rustu Nuran (ROM), Carmelo Paternico (ITA), Seffi Shemmesh (ISR)

=== Game 5 ===
13 November 2013
16:40 CET

Boxscore

BC Nizhny Novgorod (Russia)	87–53	(Greece) PAOK
Scoring by quarter: 19–12, 18–18, 18–10, 32–13
Pts: Thompson 15; Rebs: Thompson 11; Asts: Four players 3		Pts: Tsairelis 13; Rebs: Three players 6 Asts: Four players 2

Trade Union Sport Palace, Nizhny Novgorod
Attendance: 500
Referees: Sreten Radovic (CRO), Radomir Vojinovic (MNE), Omer Esteron (ISR)

13 November 2013
17:00 CET

Boxscore

Khimik Yuzhne (Ukraine)	84–76	(Montenegro) Budućnost VOLI Podgorica
Scoring by quarter: 15–26, 23–17, 20–19, 26–14
Pts: Gatens, Freimanis 17; Rebs: Gatens 8 Asts: Delaney 6		Pts: Ćapin 15; Rebs: Šehović 7 Asts: Ćapin 7

FSC Olymp, Yuzhne
Attendance: 1,000
Referees: Petri Mantyla (FIN), Ioannis Foufis (GRE), Jurgis Laurinavicius (LTU)

13 November 2013
18:30 CET

Boxscore

Bericap Alba Fehérvár (Hungary)	92–84	(Turkey) Aykon TED Ankara
Scoring by quarter: 16–28, 29–18, 19–24, 28–14
Pts: Moore 23; Rebs: Somogyi 7 Asts: Four players 4		Pts: Plisnić 23; Rebs: Golubović 7 Asts: Three players 4

Veszprém Aréna, Veszprém
Attendance: 1,450
Referees: Marek Cmikiewicz (POL), Marius Ciulin (ROM), Aleksandar Glisic (SRB)

=== Game 6 ===
19 November 2013
19:00 CET

Boxscore

Budućnost VOLI Podgorica (Montenegro)	69–75	(Greece) PAOK
Scoring by quarter: 17–22, 21–18, 13–21, 18–14
Pts: Šehović 18; Rebs: Akindele 10; Asts: Ivanović, Šehović 3		Pts: Charalampidis 21; Rebs: Cooper 8 Asts: Cooper 6

Morača Sports Center, Podgorica
Attendance: 4,100
Referees: Sinisa Herceg (SLO), Gianluca Mattioli (ITA), Uros Obrknezevic (SRB)

20 November 2013
17:00 CET

Boxscore

Khimik Yuzhne (Ukraine)	79–81	(Turkey) Aykon TED Ankara
Scoring by quarter: 14–17, 23–23, 24–21, 18–20
Pts: Gatens 14; Rebs: Travis 8 Asts: Shuler, Delaney 6		Pts: Golubović 22; Rebs: Golubović 17; Asts: Rašić 10

FSC Olymp, Yuzhne
Attendance: 1,000
Referees: Tomas Jasevicius (LTU), Ingus Baumanis (LAT), Semen Ovinov (RUS)

20 November 2013
19:00 CET

Boxscore

Bericap Alba Fehérvár (Hungary)	78–84	(Russia) BC Nizhny Novgorod
Scoring by quarter: 23–18, 17–29, 19–19, 19–18
Pts: Moore 21; Rebs: Somogyi 8 Asts: Hobbs, Juhos 2		Pts: Panin 20; Rebs: Brezec 7 Asts: Golovin, Khvostov 4

Veszprém Aréna, Veszprém
Attendance: 1,100
Referees: Petri Mantyla (FIN), Aare Halliko (FIN), Milos Koljensic (SRB)

=== Game 7 ===
27 November 2013
16:40 CET

Boxscore

BC Nizhny Novgorod (Russia)	86–66	(Ukraine) Khimik Yuzhne
Scoring by quarter: 21–20, 16–16, 19–16, 30–14
Pts: Babbitt 18; Rebs: Thompson 8 Asts: Panin 4		Pts: Pustovoj 11; Rebs: Travis 8 Asts: Shuler 4

Trade Union Sport Palace, Nizhny Novgorod
Attendance: 700
Referees: Joseph Bissang (FRA), Zdravko Rutesic (MNE), Arnis Ozols (LAT)

27 November 2013
17:30 CET

Boxscore

Aykon TED Ankara (Turkey)	81–75	(Montenegro) Budućnost VOLI Podgorica
Scoring by quarter: 16–16, 19–20, 23–18, 21–21
Pts: Golubović 19; Rebs: Golubović 11; Asts: Rašić 5		Pts: Mihailović 15; Rebs: Akindele 8 Asts: Ivanović 4

Ankara Arena, Ankara
Attendance: 500
Referees: Anastasios Piloidis (GRE), Francisco Araa (ESP), Markos Michalides (SUI)

27 November 2013
18:30 CET

Boxscore

PAOK (Greece)	68–64	(Hungary) Bericap Alba Fehérvár
Scoring by quarter: 17–16, 23–13, 12–16, 16–19
Pts: Payne, Bogris 12; Rebs: Tsairelis, Bogris 6 Asts: Cooper 5		Pts: Hobbs 16; Rebs: Hobbs 6 Asts: Hobbs 5

P.A.O.K. Sports Arena, Thessaloniki
Attendance: 985
Referees: Emin Mogulkoc (TUR), Jasmina Juras (SRB), Aleksandar Milojevic (MKD)

=== Game 8 ===
3 December 2013
16:40 CET

Boxscore

Khimik Yuzhne (Ukraine)	81–52	(Hungary) Bericap Alba Fehérvár
Scoring by quarter: 23–16, 14–9, 26–13, 18–14
Pts: Gatens 17; Rebs: Freimanis 7 Asts: Shuler 4		Pts: Somogyi 20; Rebs: Somogyi 11; Asts: Hobbs, Tóth 4

FSC Olymp, Yuzhne
Attendance: 1,000
Referees: Andrej Jersan (SLO), Igor Dragojevic (MNE), Josip Radojkovic (SRB)

4 December 2013
18:00 CET

Boxscore

Aykon TED Ankara (Turkey)	84–65	(Greece) PAOK
Scoring by quarter: 28-7, 20-11, 18-26, 18-21
Pts: Tucker 24; Rebs: Golubović 13; Asts: Valters 7		Pts: Bogris 19; Rebs: Cooper 7 Asts: Cooper 13

Ankara Arena, Ankara
Attendance: 1,000
Referees: Borys Ryzhyk (UKR), Seffi Shemmesh (ISR), Piotr Pastusiak (POL)

4 December 2013
18:30 CET

Boxscore

Budućnost VOLI Podgorica (Montenegro)	88–91 (OT)	(Russia) BC Nizhny Novgorod
Scoring by quarter: 21-21, 15-18, 18-20, 25-20, Overtime: 9-12
Pts: Mihailović 26; Rebs: Akindele 8 Asts: Popović 4		Pts: Brezec 21; Rebs: Antonov 7 Asts: Brezec 5

Morača Sports Center, Podgorica
Attendance: 0
Referees: Recep Ankarali( TUR), Petros Papapetrou (GRE), Regis Bardera (FRA)

=== Game 9 ===
10 December 2013
17:00 CET

Boxscore

Khimik Yuzhne (Ukraine)	70–58	(Greece) PAOK
Scoring by quarter: 15–11, 8–22, 25–11, 22–14
Pts: Delaney 16; Rebs: Shuler 6 Asts: Delaney 5		Pts: Tsairelis 17; Rebs: Cooper 7 Asts: Cooper 7

FSC Olymp, Yuzhne
Attendance: 1,500
Referees: Milija Vojinovic (SRB), Gentian Cici (ALB), Ilya Putenko (RUS)

11 December 2013
16:40 CET

Boxscore

BC Nizhny Novgorod (Russia)	87–92	(Turkey) Aykon TED Ankara
Scoring by quarter: 22–29, 21–15, 21–27, 23–21
Pts: Babbitt 28; Rebs: Panin, Thompson 8 Asts: Panin, Savelyev 5		Pts: Tucker 23; Rebs: Candan, Golubović 9 Asts: Valters 9

Trade Union Sport Palace, Nizhny Novgorod
Attendance: 700
Referees: Andrej Jersan (SLO), Igor Dragojevic (MNE), David Romano (ISR)

11 December 2013
19:00 CET

Boxscore

Bericap Alba Fehérvár (Hungary)	82–80	(Montenegro) Budućnost VOLI Podgorica
Scoring by quarter: 21–16, 26–29, 13–18, 22–17
Pts: Moore 24; Rebs: Somogyi 6 Asts: Hobbs, Tóth 3		Pts: Akindele 22; Rebs: Akindele 13; Asts: Vitkovac 5

Veszprém Aréna, Veszprém
Attendance: 550
Referees: Tomas Jasevicius (LTU), Oskars Lucis (LAT), Alexey Davydov (RUS)

=== Game 10 ===
18 December 2013
18:00 CET

Boxscore

Aykon TED Ankara (Turkey)	84–64	(Hungary) Bericap Alba Fehérvár
Scoring by quarter: 29–12, 18–19, 16–22, 21–11
Pts: Plisnić 23; Rebs: Golubović 11; Asts: Rašić 7		Pts: Somogyi 14; Rebs: Somogyi 7 Asts: Supola 6

Ankara Arena, Ankara
Attendance: 750
Referees: Radomir Vojinovic (SRB), Zdravko Rutesic (MNE), Mario Majkic (SLO)

18 December 2013
20:00 CET

Boxscore

PAOK (Greece)	52–60	(Russia) BC Nizhny Novgorod
Scoring by quarter: 21–13, 3–16, 15–17, 13–14
Pts: Dedas 11; Rebs: Bogris 9 Asts: Cooper 8		Pts: Brezec 16; Rebs: Antonov 11; Asts: Khvostov 4

P.A.O.K. Sports Arena, Thessaloniki
Attendance: 512
Referees: Sasa Pukl (SLO), Emilio Perez Pizarro (ESP), Srdan Dozai (CRO)

18 December 2013
20:30 CET

Boxscore

Budućnost VOLI Podgorica (Montenegro)	91–87	(Ukraine) Khimik Yuzhne
Scoring by quarter: 16–18, 30–21, 24–23, 21–25
Pts: Ivanović 14; Rebs: Šehović 7 Asts: Ivanović 6		Pts: Gatens 24; Rebs: Freimanis 6 Asts: Delaney 6

Morača Sports Center, Podgorica
Attendance: 0
Referees: Robert Vyklicky (CZE), Saverio Lanzarini (ITA), David Romano (ISR)
