= Hapoel Be'eri B.C. =

Israeli basketball club

Hapoel Be'eri הפועל בארי
- Leagues: Liga Artzit
- Founded: 1973; 53 years ago
- Arena: New Sports Hall (capacity: 320)
- Location: Be'eri, Israel
- Team colors: Red and White
- President: Itay Cohen
- Head coach: Victor Skornik
| Home | Away |

Hapoel Be'eri (Hebrew: הפועל בארי) was a basketball club based in Be'eri.

== History ==
Hapoel Be'eri - member Associations 'Hapoel' and kept in close touch with the Kibbutz Movement's sports section. Settlement sector is not recognized as a separate province in the center running. Group members Be'eri athletes participated in many sports and in 1985 received a branch of the verb "Be'eri meager allocations athletic activities. Group was established in 1973 "Hapoel Be'eri", Qualified for the 'Third Division' at the end of the season.

Up to a month in June 1998 played a group of "Hapoel Be'eri" in the league in a league up. At that time the group moved to the new gym to play. March 2000 came to the Liga Arzit. Played basketball against teams from Lod to Eilat. In 2001 club won fourth place. Most of the players acquired players. The main actor - "Itai Cohen" (Grew up in Be'eri). Prior to opening the 8th "Liga Arzit", joined the group two members of Be'eri - Yair Cohen and Shai Brill.

2007–08 season came to the Liga Leumit - is the second league (!) In Israel. The group dealt with the best teams from around the country and fought for Survival in the league. in the Season finale, the team dropped to the Liga Arzit back. However, due to the dissolution of Other team, Hapoel Be'eri remained in the minors. And play there during 2009/2010.

2008/2009 season was coach "Zvika Rosenberg", who succeeded [1] in the middle of the season the coach "Asaf Foss" was an actor in her past.

In April 2010 "Zvika Rosenberg" fired coach following the sequence of losses caused to lose a chance to participate in group Upper playoffs. Replacing it "Itai Barkan".

The coach of the 2010-2011 was "Hanoh Mintz" at the beginning but he was replaced by Victor Skornick, Hapoel Be'eri finished at 13th place and was supposed to go to the "Liga Artzit" but the League Administration decided to let all the teams that were supposed to go to the "Liga Artzit" to stay.

== Management team ==
- Chairman - Itay Cohen
- Group Manager - Bermaak Udi
- Assistant Coach - Eric Ckeraunik

== Notable former players ==
- (Israel) (Germany) Alon Stein
- (Israel) (France) Yoni Dray
- (Israel) Moran Roth
