= Yoni Dray =

French-born Israeli basketball player

Yoni Dray יוני דרעי
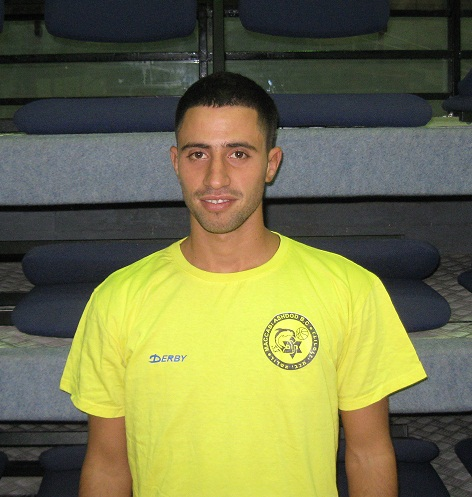

Free agent
- Position: Point guard

Personal information
- Born: March 17, 1987 (age 39) Marseille, France
- Listed height: 1.78 m (5 ft 10 in)

Career information
- Playing career: 2006–present

Career history
- 2006–2009: Hapoel Be'eri
- 2009–2011: Maccabi Ashdod
- 2011–2012: Hapoel Afula
- 2012: Maccabi Ashdod
- 2012–2013: Ironi Nahariya
- 2016–2019: Elitzur Ashkelon

Yoni Dray (Hebrew: יוני דרעי; born March 17, 1987) is an Israeli professional basketball player, He is a 1.78 m tall point guard.

== Biography ==
Dray was born in Marseille, France. At age seven, he moved to Israel with his family and since has lived in Ashdod. Dray is a graduate of the youth department of Elitzur Ashdod.

=== Playing career ===
Dray started his career at Hapoel Be'eri in the third division. He played there for three seasons and led the team to qualify from the third division to the second division.

In the beginning of the 2009/10 season, he returned to Ashdod and signed with Maccabi Ashdod. At the end of the season he moved with the club to the first division in Israel. In 2010/11 season, he played in every game. Following the disappointment of his home team, he moved to second league team Hapoel Afula. At Hapoel Afula he became a leader. He played an average of 29.57 minutes, producing 8.3 points, 2.3 rebounds and 6.3 assists.

At the beginning of season 2012/13, he re-signed with Maccabi Ashdod.
