= Alon Stein =

Israeli-German basketball coach

Alon Stein אלון שטיין
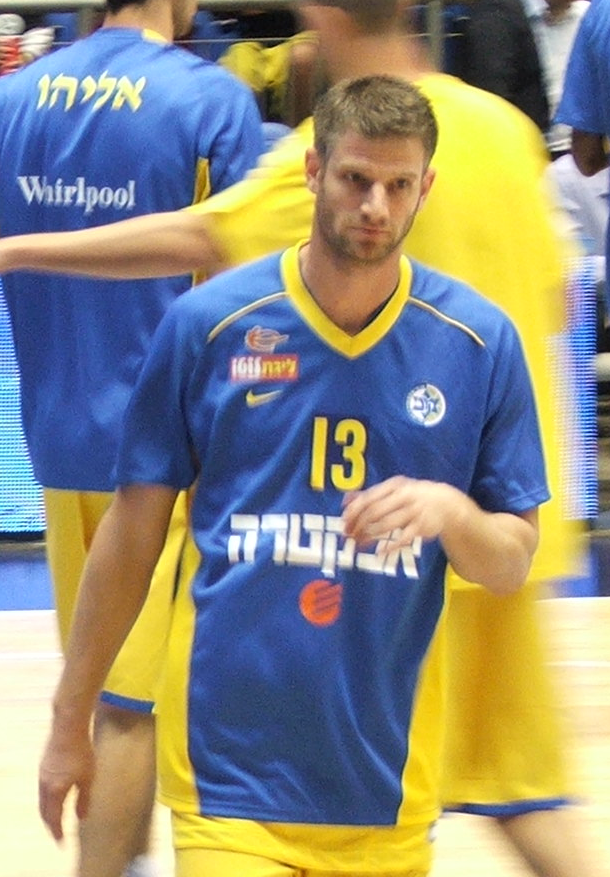
- Stein while playing with Maccabi Tel Aviv

Personal information
- Born: January 4, 1978 (age 48) Hadera, Israel
- Listed height: 6 ft 2 in (1.88 m)

Career information
- NBA draft: 2000: undrafted
- Playing career: 1995–2012
- Position: Point guard
- Coaching career: 2013–present

Career history

Playing
- 1995–1999: Hapoel Galil Elyon
- 1999–2000: Maccabi Kiryat Motzkin
- 2000–2001: Hapoel Galil Elyon
- 2001–2002: Hapoel Tel Aviv
- 2002–2003: ratiopharm Ulm
- 2003–2004: Geneve Devils
- 2004–2006: Eisbaeren Bremerhaven
- 2006–2007: Geneve Devils
- 2007: MyGuide Amsterdam
- 2007: Hapoel Be'er Sheva
- 2008: Hapoel Beeri
- 2008–2009: Elitzur Yavne
- 2010–2011: Lugano Tigers
- 2011–2012: Maccabi Tel Aviv

Coaching
- 2013–2015: Maccabi Tel Aviv (assistant)
- 2015–2019: Bnei Herzliya (assistant)
- 2019–2021: Hapoel Hevel Modi'in
- 2021–2023: Maccabi Rishon Lezion (assistant)

Career highlights
- As assistant coach: Euroleague champion (2014)

Alon Stein (Hebrew: אלון שטיין; born January 4, 1978) is an Israeli-German professional basketball coach and former player. He most recently worked as assistant coach for Maccabi Rishon Lezion of the Israeli Premier League.

== Biography ==
Alon Stein was born in Hadera, Israel. He scored 60 points at the State Youth Cup final in 1992, when he was 14 years old.

== Sports career ==
He played for the Israeli U22 National Team in 1996–98, alongside Oded Kattash.

His first professional team was Hapoel Galil Elyon, which he joined in 1995, at the age of 17. In 2011, Stein signed with Maccabi Tel Aviv.

On June 27, 2019, Stein was named Hapoel Hevel Modi'in new head coach.
