= Göktürk Gökalp Ural =

Turkish basketball player

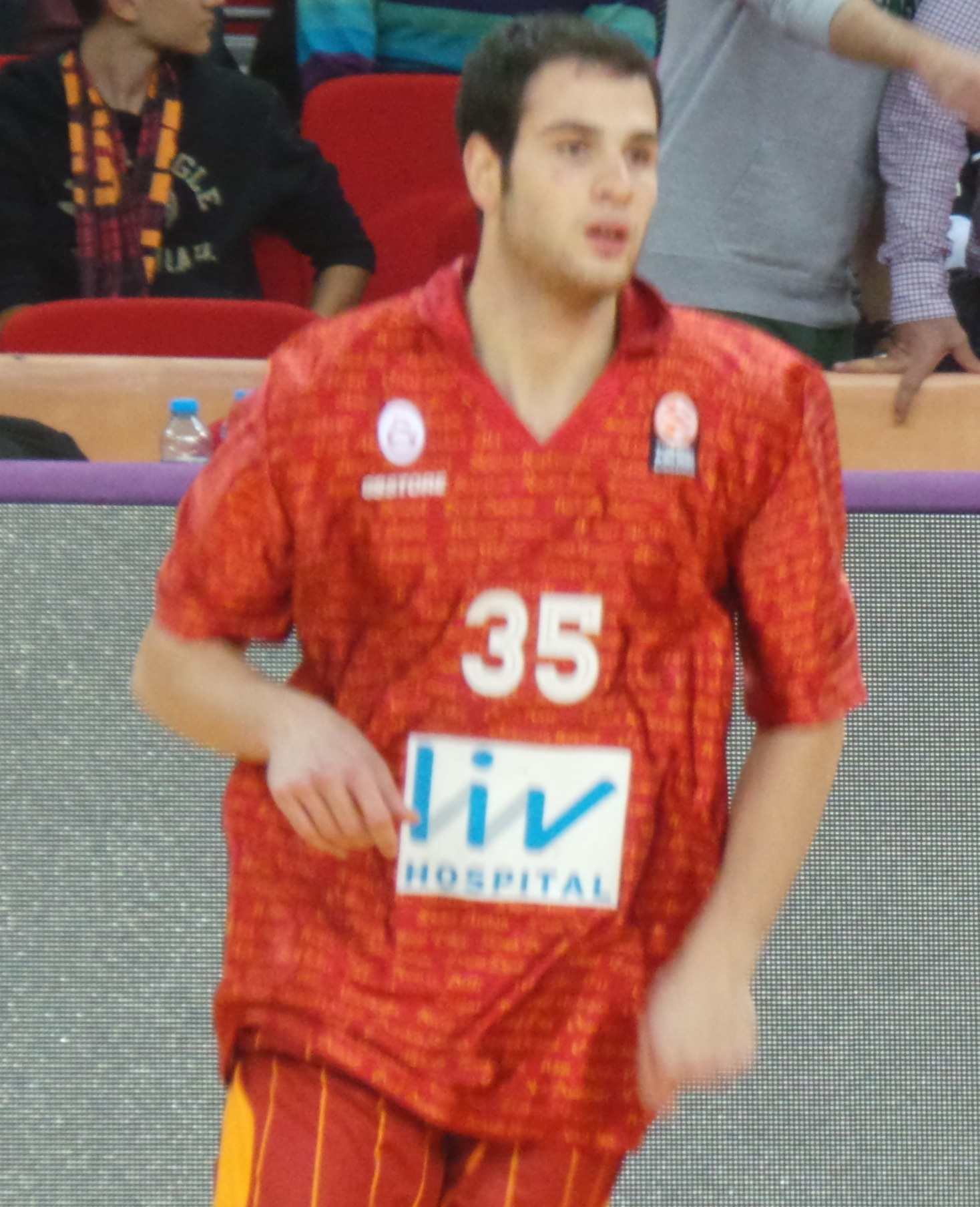

No. 35 – Galatasaray Liv Hospital
- Position: Shooting guard / small forward
- League: Turkish Basketball League; Euroleague

Personal information
- Born: May 31, 1995 (age 31) Istanbul, Turkey
- Listed height: 6 ft 6 in (1.98 m)

Career information
- Playing career: 2014–present

Career history
- 2014–present: Galatasaray Liv Hospital

Göktürk Gökalp Ural (born May 31, 1995) is a Turkish professional basketball player who plays for Galatasaray Liv Hospital of the Turkish Basketball League.

== Professional career ==
Göktürk grew up with the youth team of Galatasaray Istanbul. And was added to the training camp of the team before the start of the season 2014–15.

=== Early years ===
Göktürk has been a member of the Turkish U-16 and U-20 National Team.

In the season 2013-14 Göktürk served as the captain of the youth team of Galatasaray, leading his team to the championship in the Istanbul League and 3rd place in the National League.

During the National League he averaged 15 points, 6.6 rebounds and 7.1 assists per game. And was selected 'Forward of the Tournament', while also leading the league in assists.
