= Dijon Thompson =

American basketball player (born 1983)

Personal information
- Born: February 23, 1983 (age 43) Los Angeles, California, U.S.
- Listed height: 6 ft 7 in (2.01 m)
- Listed weight: 210 lb (95 kg)

Career information
- High school: Redondo Union (Redondo Beach, California)
- College: UCLA (2001–2005)
- NBA draft: 2005: 2nd round, 54th overall pick
- Drafted by: New York Knicks
- Playing career: 2005–2018
- Position: Shooting guard / small forward
- Number: 1, 7

Career history
- 2005–2006: Phoenix Suns
- 2005–2006: Albuquerque Thunderbirds
- 2007: Atlanta Hawks
- 2007–2008: ALBA Berlin
- 2008–2009: Azovmash Mariupol
- 2009–2010: Hapoel Jerusalem
- 2010–2011: Spartak St. Petersburg
- 2011–2012: ASVEL Basket
- 2012–2014: Nizhny Novgorod
- 2014: Saigon Heat
- 2015: Hapoel Tel Aviv
- 2016: Petrolina AEK Larnaca
- 2016–2017: Hapoel Jerusalem
- 2017: Nizhny Novgorod
- 2017–2018: Ferro Carril Oeste
- 2018: Levanga Hokkaido

Career highlights
- Cypriot Super Cup winner (2016); All-EuroCup First Team (2014); All-EuroCup Second Team (2010); First-team All-Pac-10 (2005)
- Stats at NBA.com
- Stats at Basketball Reference

Dijon Lynn Thompson (born February 23, 1983) is an American former professional basketball player who played briefly in the National Basketball Association (NBA). While he played mainly at the shooting guard position in his early career, he also played as a small forward during his European years.

== Career ==
=== College ===
Thompson played for the University of California, Los Angeles (UCLA). He had an all-time scoring average of 15.6 points per game, including 18.4 as a junior. He scored a career-high 39 points against Arizona State on February 10, 2005.

Thompson declared for the NBA draft after the conclusion of his junior year, but withdrew to return for his senior season. That year he led the Bruins to the NCAA Tournament after a two-year absence.

=== NBA ===
Thompson was chosen by the New York Knicks in the second round of the 2005 NBA draft (54th pick overall). Soon afterward he was traded along with forward-center Kurt Thomas to the Phoenix Suns, in exchange for guard Quentin Richardson, the draft rights to guard Nate Robinson and cash considerations.

On November 4, 2005, the Suns assigned him to the Albuquerque Thunderbirds of the NBA D-League where he averaged 17.7 points and 7.7 rebounds in three games. The Suns made him the first player of the season recalled from the D-League on November 26, after Leandro Barbosa suffered a knee injury.

On March 10, 2006, Thompson underwent microfracture surgery on his right knee, causing him to sit out the rest of the season. By June 23, it was announced that the Suns were not picking up Thompson's player-option for his second season making him a free-agent.

On October 2, 2006, the Golden State Warriors invited Thompson to their training camp, however, he was cut by the team just a week later on October 11.

On November 27, 2006, Thompson was reacquired by the Albuquerque Thunderbirds and made an immediate impact by averaging 20.8 points and 9.8 rebounds during his first five games. On December 11, Thompson was named the D-League Performer of the Week.

On January 6, 2007, Thompson was signed to a 10-day contract by the Atlanta Hawks while forward Josh Smith recovered from a hernia operation. The Hawks renewed for a second 10-day contract, on January 16, with Thompson averaging 2.8 points, 1.3 rebounds, and 8.3 minutes in six games. Upon his return to the D-League, Thompson scored 14 points in the 2007 NBA D-League All-Star Game in Las Vegas, Nevada on February 19, 2007. He finished the year leading the Thunderbirds franchise to a playoff berth, though, they lost in the first round.

Thompson was named All-NBA Development League Honorable Mention Team for the 2006–07 season.

=== Europe ===
On July 27, 2007, Thompson signed a one-year contract with Alba Berlin. ALBA and Thompson agreed to part ways in May 2008.

On June 10, 2008, Thompson signed a contract with Azovmash Mariupol.

On September 4, 2009, Thompson signed a 2-year contract with Hapoel Jerusalem.

He played the 2010–11 season for Spartak Saint Petersburg in the Russian Professional Basketball League.

In July 2011 he signed a one-year contract with ASVEL Lyon-Villeurbanne in France.

In September 2012, he signed with Nizhny Novgorod of the Russian Professional Basketball League. He was named to the All-EuroCup First Team in 2014.

On February 17, 2015, Thompson signed a half-year contract with Hapoel Tel Aviv.

On June 22, 2016, Thompson signed a one-year contract with AEL Larnaca in Cyprus. Following the expiration of this contract, Thompson retired from professional sports.

=== Post-professional career ===
After retiring, Thompson began a new role as the head basketball coach at Valley Christian Schools.
