= Vadim Panin =

Russian basketball player

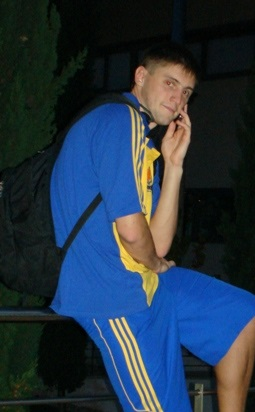
- A BC Khimki forward Vadim Panin.

Free agent
- Position: Small forward

Personal information
- Born: February 10, 1984 (age 42) Moscow, Russian Soviet Federative Socialist Republic, Soviet Union
- Listed height: 6 ft 8 in (2.03 m)
- Listed weight: 220 lb (100 kg)

Career information
- NBA draft: 2006: undrafted
- Playing career: 2002–present

Career history
- 2002–2004: Dynamo Moscow
- 2004: Dynamo Moscow Region
- 2004–2005: Lokomotiv Rostov
- 2005–2006: Ural Great Perm
- 2006–2007: UNICS Kazan
- 2007–2008: Spartak Vladivostok
- 2008–2010: Triumph Lyubertsy
- 2010–2011: Khimki Moscow Region
- 2011–2014: Nizhny Novgorod
- 2014–2017: UNICS Kazan
- 2017–2018: Nizhny Novgorod
- 2018–2019: Zenit Saint Petersburg

Career highlights
- FIBA EuroCup Challenge champion (2006); VTB United League champion (2011)

Vadim Aleksandrovich Panin (Russian: Вадим Александрович Панин, born February 10, 1984) is a Russian professional basketball player who last played for Zenit Saint Petersburg of the VTB United League and the EuroCup. Standing at 2.03 m (6 ft 8 in), he plays at the small forward position.

== Professional career ==
Panin has played with the following clubs in his pro career: Dynamo Moscow, Dynamo Moscow Region, Lokomotiv Rostov, Ural Great Perm, UNICS Kazan, Spartak Vladivostok, Triumph Lyubertsy, Khimki Moscow Region, and Nizhny Novgorod.

== Russian national team ==
Panin was a member of the junior national teams of Russia.
