= Vladimir Golubović =

Serbian-Montenegrin basketball player

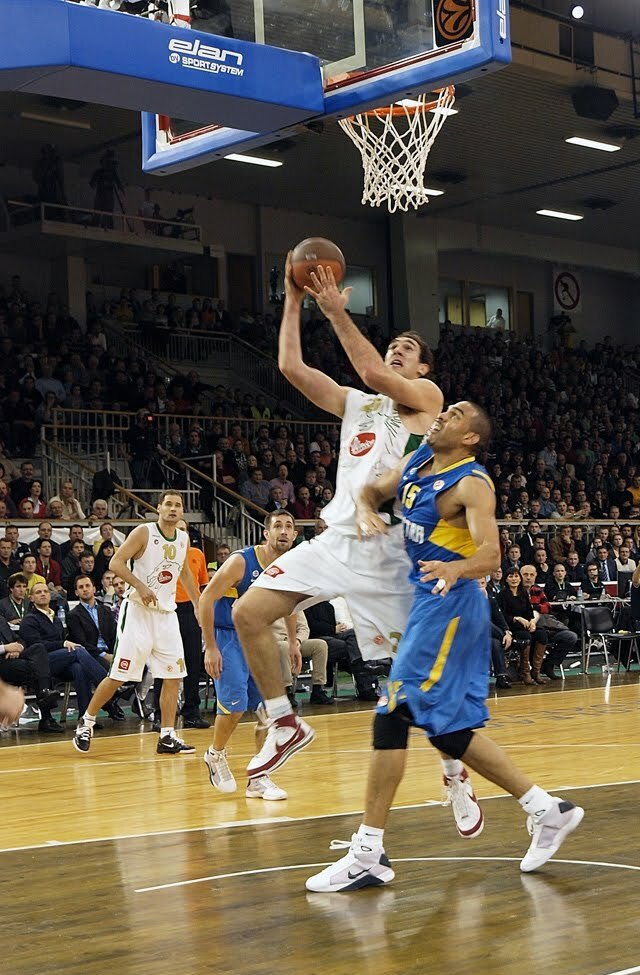
- Golubović with Olimpija versus Maccabi in Euroleague in December 2009.

Free agent
- Position: Center

Personal information
- Born: 24 February 1986 (age 40) Novi Sad, SFR Yugoslavia
- Listed height: 2.12 m (6 ft 11 in)
- Listed weight: 123 kg (271 lb)

Career information
- NBA draft: 2008: undrafted
- Playing career: 2003–present

Career history
- 2003–2008: Vojvodina Srbijagas
- 2008–2010: Union Olimpija
- 2010: Caja Laboral
- 2010–2011: Banvit
- 2011: Azovmash
- 2011–2012: Caja Laboral
- 2013: Antalya BB
- 2013: Al Ahli Dubai
- 2013: CAI Zaragoza
- 2013–2014: TED Ankara Kolejliler
- 2014–2015: Unicaja Málaga
- 2015: Strasbourg IG
- 2016: Pallacanestro Reggiana
- 2016–2017: Best Balıkesir
- 2017–2018: Real Betis Energía Plus
- 2019: Spartak Primorye
- 2020: Al-Rayyan
- 2021–2023: Vienna

Career highlights
- All-EuroCup First Team (2014); Spanish League champion (2010); Slovenian League champion (2009); 2× Slovenian Cup winner (2009, 2010); Slovenian Supercup winner (2009)
Medals
Men's basketball
Representing Serbia and Montenegro
Universiade
Bronze medal – third place	2005 Izmir	Team competition
U20 European Championship
Bronze medal – third place	2005 Russia	U20 National Team

Vladimir Golubović (Serbian Cyrillic: Владимир Голубовић; born 24 February 1986) is a Serbian-born Montenegrin professional basketball player who last played for Vienna of the Austrian Basketball Superliga. Standing at 2.12 m (6 ft 11 1/2 in), he plays at the center position.

== Professional career ==
Golubović started his career with Vojvodina from his hometown Novi Sad, where he was born to Montenegrin parents. He played with them from 2003 to 2008. In August 2008, he signed a two-year contract with the Slovenian club Union Olimpija. In February 2010, he parted ways with Olimpija, and signed a contract with the Spanish club Caja Laboral.

In July 2010, he signed a one-year contract with the Turkish club Banvit. In September 2011, he signed with the Ukrainian club Azovmash.In December 2011, he returned to his former team Caja Laboral, signing a two-month contract. In February 2012, he was re-signed until the end of the 2012 Spanish Cup,

In March 2013, he signed with the Turkish club Antalya Büyükşehir Belediyesi. The next month, he moved to Dubai and signed with Al Ahli,.After winning silver medal on GCC championship he returned to Europe and signed with the Spanish club CAI Zaragoza for the 2013 ACB Playoffs.

In August 2013, he signed a one-year contract with the Turkish club TED Ankara Kolejliler. In April 2014, he was named to the All-EuroCup First Team. In June 2014, he signed a one-year deal with the Spanish club Unicaja Málaga.

On 6 September 2015, he signed a contract until the end of the EuroLeague regular season, with French club Strasbourg IG.With the French club he won French Supercup. On 29 December 2015, he signed with the Italian club Pallacanestro Reggiana for the rest of the season.

On 2 July 2016, Golubović signed with Best Balıkesir for the 2016–17 season.

On 21 September 2017, Golubović signed with Spanish club Real Betis Energía Plus.

On 1 March 2020, Golubović signed with Al-Rayyan of the Qatari Basketball League.

On 13 January 2021, Golubović signed with Vienna of the Austrian Basketball Superliga. He re-signed with the team on 1 February 2023.

== National team ==
As a member of the Serbia and Montenegro national basketball team, Golubović won the bronze medal at the 2005 Summer Universiade in Izmir and 2005 FIBA Europe Under-20 Championship in Russia.

He was also a member of the Montenegro national basketball team.
