= Semyon Antonov =

Russian basketball player (born 1989)

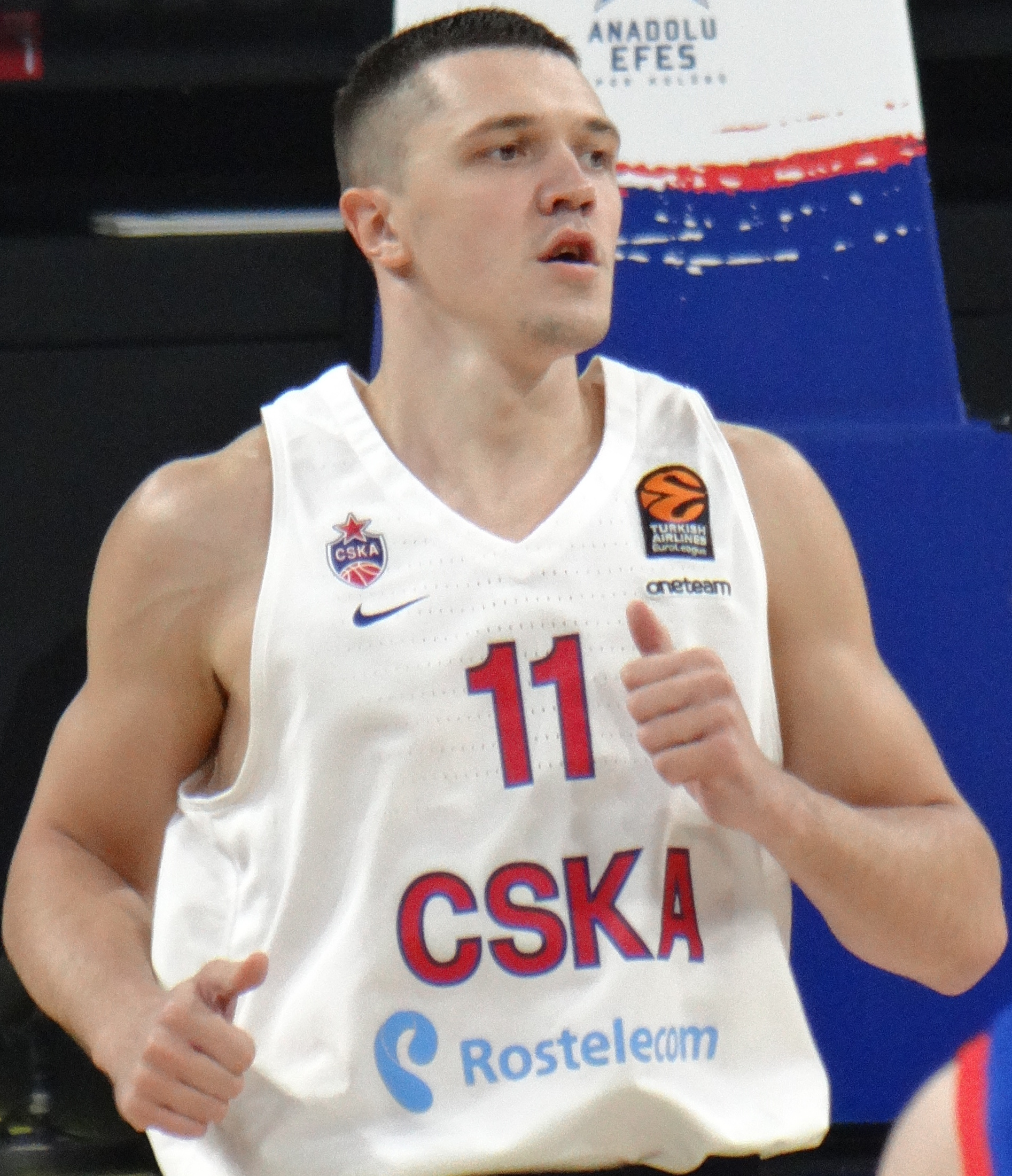
- Antonov in 2017

No. 11 – CSKA Moscow
- Position: Power forward
- League: VTB United League

Personal information
- Born: July 18, 1989 (age 37) Nizhnevartovsk, Russian SFSR, Soviet Union
- Listed height: 6 ft 8 in (2.03 m)
- Listed weight: 229 lb (104 kg)

Career information
- NBA draft: 2011: undrafted
- Playing career: 2006–present

Career history
- 2006–2009: Avtodor Saratov
- 2009–2010: TSU Basket Tambov
- 2011–2016: Nizhny Novgorod
- 2016–present: CSKA Moscow

Career highlights
- EuroLeague champion (2019); 3× VTB United League champion (2017–2019)
Medals
Men's basketball
Representing Russia
Olympic Games
Bronze medal – third place	2012 London	Team
EuroBasket
Bronze medal – third place	2011 Lithuania

Semyon Sergeyevich Antonov (Russian: Семён Сергеевич Антонов, born July 18, 1989) is a Russian professional basketball player for CSKA Moscow of the VTB United League. He also represents the senior Russian national team, winning bronze medals at European and Olympic level.

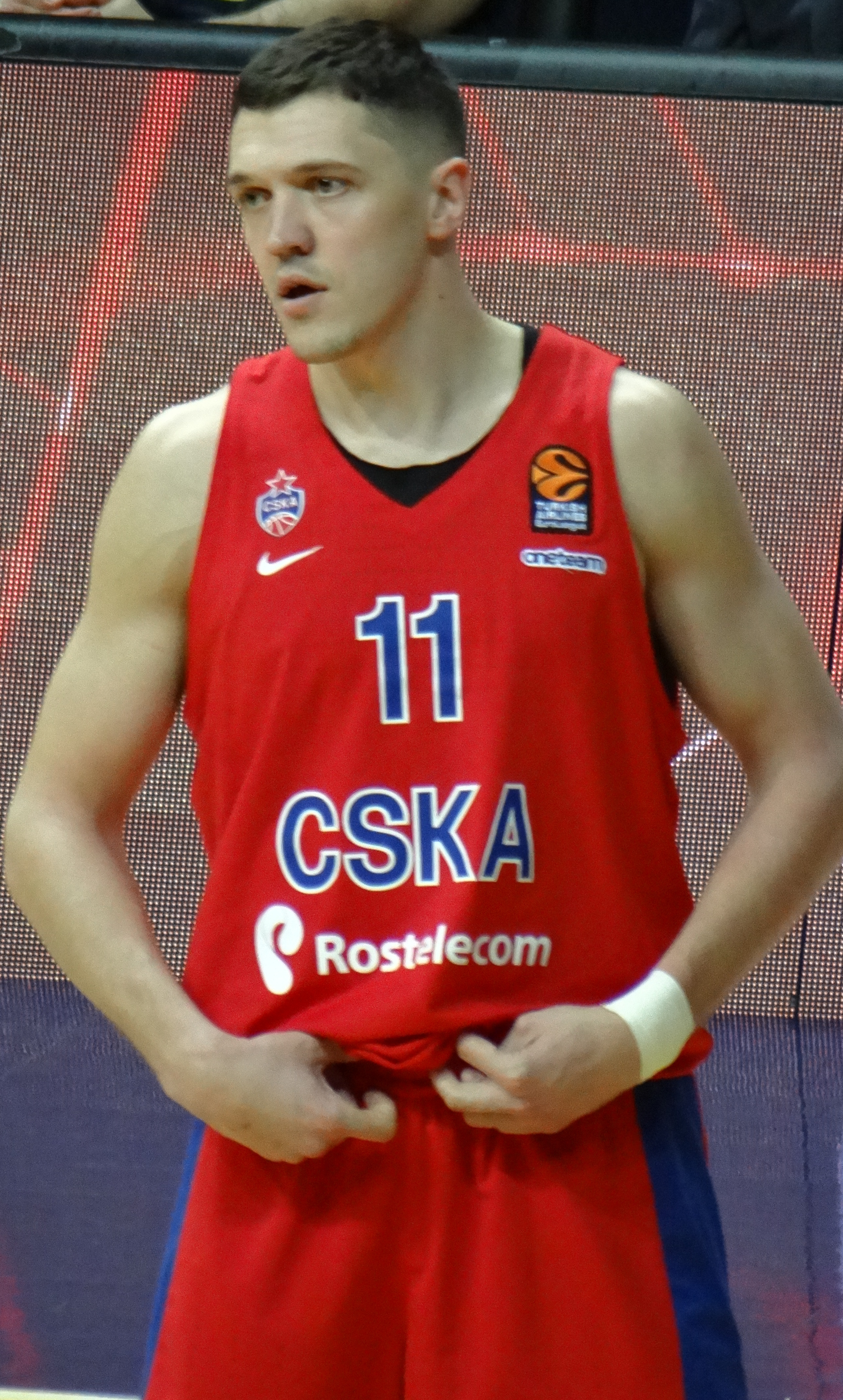
Antonov in 2018

== Professional career ==
Antonov started his profession career with Avtodor Saratov in 2006. He stayed in the club until the end of 2008–09 season, and moved to TSU Basket Tambov for one season. In 2011, he moved to Nizhny Novgorod where he stayed for six seasons.

On June 17, 2016, Antonov signed a two-year contract with the option of another year with the Russian team CSKA Moscow. On June 21, 2021, Antonov renewed his contract with CSKA for three more seasons.

== National team career ==
Antonov was a member of the junior national teams of Russia. With Russia's junior national teams, he played at the 2007 FIBA Europe Under-18 Championship, the 2008 FIBA Europe Under-20 Championship, and the 2009 FIBA Europe Under-20 Championship.

He has also been a member of the senior Russian national basketball team. With Russia's senior team, he played at the EuroBasket 2011, where he won a bronze medal, and at the 2012 Summer Olympics, where he won a bronze medal. He has also played at the EuroBasket 2013, the EuroBasket 2015, and the EuroBasket 2017.

== Career statistics ==
Legend
GP	Games played	GS	Games started	MPG	Minutes per game
FG%	Field-goal percentage	3P%	3-point field-goal percentage	FT%	Free-throw percentage
RPG	Rebounds per game	APG	Assists per game	SPG	Steals per game
BPG	Blocks per game	PPG	Points per game	PIR	Performance index rating
**Bold**	Career high

=== EuroLeague ===
†	Denotes seasons in which Antonov won the EuroLeague

Year	Team	GP	GS	MPG	FG%	3P%	FT%	RPG	APG	SPG	BPG	PPG	PIR
2014–15	Nizhny Novgorod	24	**23**	**25.6**	.380	.384	.700	**3.4**	**1.7**	**.5**	**.6**	**7.1**	**5.3**
2016–17	CSKA Moscow	28	3	8.7	.468	**.538**	**1.000**	1.1	.3	.3	.3	2.1	1.4
2017–18	CSKA Moscow	**34**	22	13.7	**.500**	.400	.727	2.1	.6	.4	.5	4.2	4.0
2018–19†	CSKA Moscow	21	5	7.1	.324	.133	.556	1.0	.1	.1	.0	1.4	1.0
2019–20	CSKA Moscow	21	0	7.9	.405	.077	.786	1.3	.0	.2	.1	2.0	1.7
2020–21	CSKA Moscow	32	1	8.5	.431	.458	.500	1.0	.3	.2	.1	1.8	1.1
2021–22	CSKA Moscow	18	4	8.6	.487	.364	.500	1.0	.1	.2	.2	2.6	1.6
Career		178	58	.9	.427	.377	.693	1.6	.5	.3	.3	3.1	2.4
