= 2017 Israeli Basketball League Cup =

Israeli basketball pre-season tournament

Tournament details
- Arena: Toto Hall; Holon
- Dates: 1–5 October 2017

Final positions
- Champions: Maccabi Tel Aviv (7th title)
- Runners-up: Ironi Nahariya

Awards and statistics
- MVP: (Israel) John DiBartolomeo

The 2017 Israeli Basketball League Cup, for sponsorships reasons the Winner League Cup, was the 12th edition of the pre-season tournament of the Israeli Basketball Premier League.

Maccabi Tel Aviv won the title for the seventh time after beating Ironi Nahariya 93–79 in the Final. John DiBartolomeo was named tournament MVP.

== Bracket ==
Quarterfinals; 1–2 October
Hapoel Eilat	71
Maccabi Rishon LeZion	77
Maccabi Tel Aviv	81
Hapoel Tel Aviv	80
Hapoel Jerusalem	84
Ironi Nahariya	87
Hapoel Holon	73
Hapoel Gilboa Galil	82

Semifinals; 3 October
Maccabi Rishon LeZion	60
Maccabi Tel Aviv	86
Ironi Nahariya	88
Hapoel Gilboa Galil	82

Final; 5 October
Maccabi Tel Aviv	93
Ironi Nahariya	79

=== Quarterfinals ===
1 October 2017	Hapoel Eilat	71–77	Maccabi Rishon LeZion	Toto Hall, Holon
19:00	Scoring by quarter: 9–11, 22–18, 22–23, 18–25
Sport 5	Pts: Loyd 17; Rebs: Treadwell 14; Asts: Berkowitz 8	Report	Pts: Tollefsen 18; Rebs: Tollefsen 10; Asts: Ben-Chimol 14	Attendance: 1,000; Referees: David Romano, Eyal Porhiles, Rotem Koza

1 October 2017	Maccabi Tel Aviv	81–80	Hapoel Tel Aviv	Toto Hall, Holon
21:00	Scoring by quarter: 18–30, 25–15, 19–19, 19–16
Sport 5	Pts: Thomas 17; Rebs: Thomas 7 Asts: DiBartolomeo 6	Report	Pts: McKee 23; Rebs: Allen 9 Asts: Limonad 14	Attendance: 3,000; Referees: Gili Cohen, Dan Yalon, David Kolangi

2 October 2017	Hapoel Jerusalem	84–87	Ironi Nahariya	Toto Hall, Holon
19:00	Scoring by quarter: 26-20, 22-20, 14-20, 22-25
Sport 5	Pts: Jerrells 16; Rebs: Eliyahu 7 Asts: Jerrells & Timor 5	Report	Pts: Webster 26; Rebs: Young 7 Asts: Ziv 5	Attendance: 2,000; Referees: Omer Esteron, Nir Meirson, Nir Keren

2 October 2017	Hapoel Holon	73–82	Hapoel Gilboa Galil	Toto Hall, Holon
21:00	Scoring by quarter: 20-25, 17-21, 15-22, 21-14
Sport 5	Pts: Holloway & Alexander 13; Rebs: Alexander 8 Asts: Holloway 4	Report	Pts: Harrison 17; Rebs: Stone 12; Asts: Brown & Szuchman 5	Attendance: 2,000; Referees: Ofer Manheim, Zachi Havdali, Pini Rimon

=== Semifinals ===
3 October 2017	Maccabi Rishon LeZion	60–86	Maccabi Tel Aviv	Toto Hall, Holon
19:00	Scoring by quarter: 13-18, 13-19, 13-25, 21-24
Sport 5	Pts: Zalmanson 13; Rebs: Crawford 8 Asts: Ben-Chimol 4	Report	Pts: DiBartolomeo 19; Rebs: Bolden & Mashour 9 Asts: DiBartolomeo & Roll 6	Attendance: 1,350; Referees: Sefi Shemesh, Kfir Moalem, Ori Shalhavi

3 October 2017	Ironi Nahariya	88–82	Hapoel Gilboa Galil	Toto Hall, Holon
21:00	Scoring by quarter: 28-10, 25-23, 22-24, 13-25
Sport 5	Pts: Young 26; Rebs: Nesterenko 9 Asts: Skjöldebrand & Nesterenko 4	Report	Pts: Harrison 23; Rebs: Stone & LeDay 12; Asts: Stone & Szuchman 4	Attendance: 1,000; Referees: Amit Balack, Lior Beinisch, David Izmirly

=== Final ===
5 October 2017	Maccabi Tel Aviv	93–79	Ironi Nahariya	Toto Hall, Holon
21:00	Scoring by quarter: 22-15, 27-21, 24-21, 20-22
Sport 5	Pts: Thomas 20; Rebs: Tyus 12; Asts: Roll 6	Report	Pts: Young 23; Rebs: Livingston 7 Asts: Webster & Ben-Zvi 3	Attendance: 5,400; Referees: Tzachi Havdali, Elad Leibovich, Guy Shmueli

Starters:			Pts	Reb	Ast
G	12	(Israel) John DiBartolomeo	11	2	3
G	5	(United States) Michael Roll	14	2	6
F	4	(Israel) Karam Mashour	5	8	1
F	43	(Australia) Jonah Bolden	11	9	1
C	45	(Belarus) Artsiom Parakhouski	11	3	1
Reserves:					
F	1	(United States) Deshaun Thomas	20	2	4
C	9	(Israel) Alex Tyus	18	12	1
G	50	(Israel) Yovel Zoosman	9	3	1
F	15	(Israel) Jake Cohen	2	2	0
C	18	(Israel) Itay Segev	0	1	0
G	30	(United States) Norris Cole	DNP		
F	8	(Israel) Deni Avdija	DNP		
Head coach:
(Croatian Basketball Federation) Neven Spahija

M. Tel Aviv	I. Nahariya

Starters:			Pts	Reb	Ast
G	99	(Israel) Yiftach Ziv	6	3	2
G	9	(New Zealand) Corey Webster	12	1	3
F	5	(United States) Alex Young	23	4	1
F	83	(Israel) Jonathan Skjöldebrand	6	6	2
C	15	(Guinea) Ousmane Drame	4	4	1
Reserves:					
G	11	(United States) Denzel Livingston	13	7	2
C	18	(Israel) Igor Nesterenko	8	0	0
G	31	(Israel) Stu Douglass	7	0	2
G	6	(Israel) Ziv Ben-Zvi	0	0	3
F	13	(Israel) Yariv Amiram	0	0	0
F	2	(Israel) Amit Shitrit	DNP		
G	8	(Israel) Neri Harrison	DNP		
Head coach:
(Israeli Basketball Association) Eric Alfasi

2017 League Cup Winners
Maccabi Tel Aviv
7th title
