= Amit Simhon =

Israeli basketball player (born 1989)

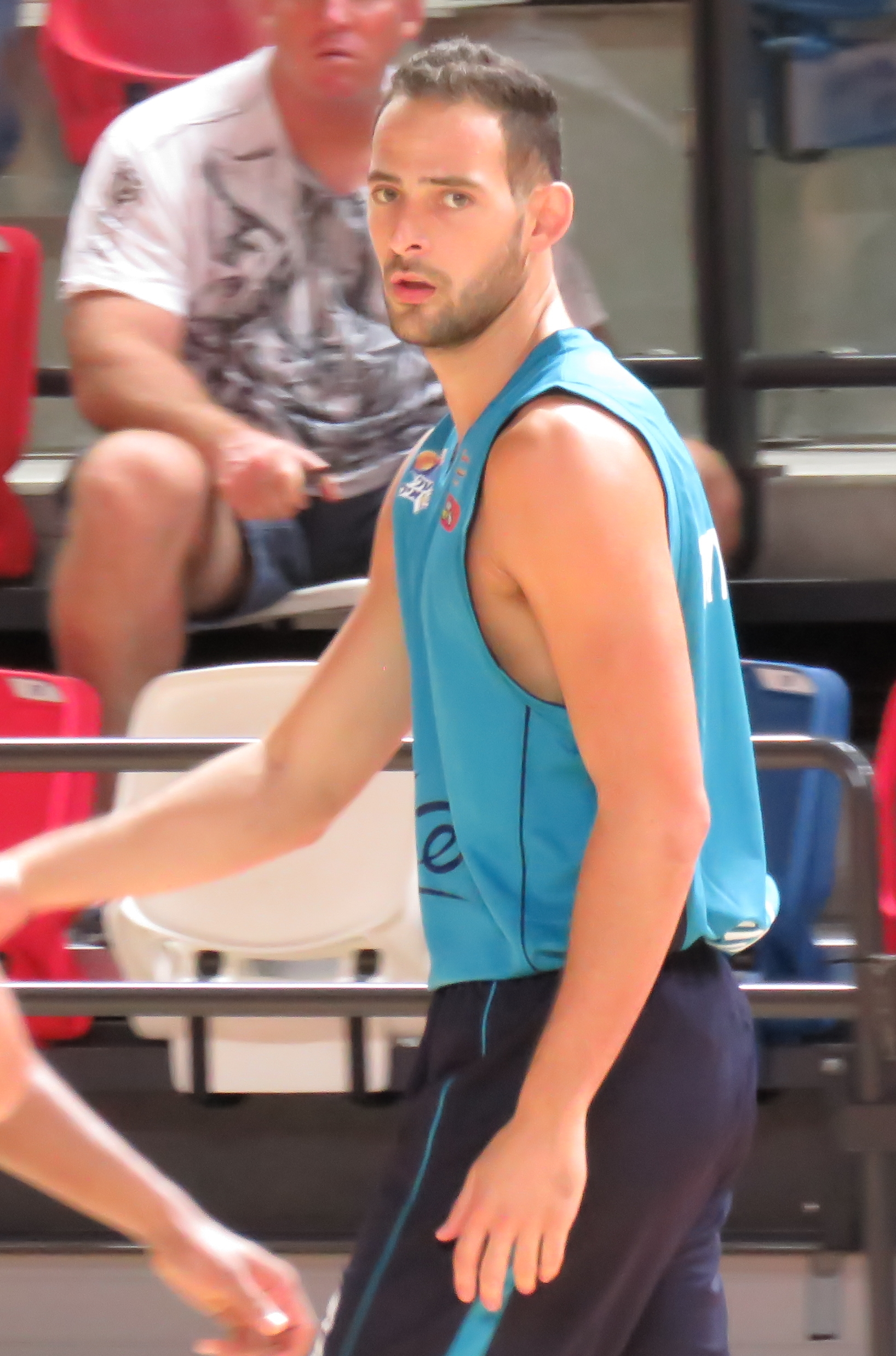
- Amit Simhon with Hapoel Eilat in September 2015

No. 8 – Hapoel Haifa
- Position: Small forward
- League: Israeli Basketball Super League

Personal information
- Born: October 22, 1989 (age 37) Ramat Gan, Israel
- Listed height: 6 ft 5 in (1.96 m)

Career information
- Playing career: 2007–present

Career history
- 2007–2009: Ironi Ramat Gan
- 2009: →Hapoel Lev HaSharon
- 2009–2010: Maccabi Hod HaSharon
- 2010–2011: Hapoel Jerusalem
- 2011: →Barak Netanya
- 2011–2012: Ironi Ashkelon
- 2012–2014: Hapoel Gilboa Galil
- 2014–2016: Hapoel Eilat
- 2016–2017: Maccabi Haifa
- 2017–2018: Hapoel Eilat
- 2018–2019: Hapoel Holon
- 2019–2020: Hapoel Be'er Sheva
- 2020–present: Hapoel Haifa

Career highlights
- All-Israeli League First Team (2018); 2× Israeli League All-Star (2016, 2018)

Amit Simhon (Hebrew: עמית שמחון; born October 22, 1989) is an Israeli basketball player at the small forward position for Hapoel Haifa of the Israeli Basketball Premier League. He was named All-Israeli League First Team in 2018, and is a two-time Israeli League All-Star (2016, 2018).

== Early life ==
Simhon was born in Ramat Gan, He played for the Hapoel Givatayim, Hapoel Aviv, and Ironi Ramat Gan youth teams.

== Professional career ==
=== Ironi Ramat Gan (2007–2009) ===
In 2007, Simhon started his professional career in Ironi Ramat Gan.

=== Maccabi Hod HaSharon (2009–2010) ===
In 2009, Simhon signed with Maccabi Hod HaSharon of the Liga Leumit. During that season, Simhon was the Liga Leumit leading scorer by averaging 19.9 points per game and was named All-Liga Leumit First Team.

=== Hapoel Jerusalem / Barak Netanya (2010–2011) ===
On July 6, 2010, Simhon signed a two-year deal Hapoel Jerusalem. However, on March 4, 2011, Simhon was loaned to Barak Netanya for the rest of the season.

=== Ironi Ashkelon (2011–2012) ===
On July 30, 2011, Simhon signed with Ironi Ashkelon for the 2011–12 season. On January 30, 2012, Simhon was named Israeli League Young Player of the Month for games played in January. On March 8, 2012, Simhon won the Three-point shootout contest during the 2012 Israeli All-Star Event.

=== Hapoel Gilboa Galil (2012–2014) ===
On July 1, 2012, Simhon signed a two-year deal with Hapoel Gilboa Galil.

=== Hapoel Eilat (2014–2016) ===
On July 6, 2014, Simhon signed a two-year contract with Hapoel Eilat. In his first season with Eilat, he helped Eilat reach the 2015 Israeli League Finals where they eventually lost to Hapoel Jerusalem. In his second season with Eilat, Simhon participated in the 2016 Israeli All-Star Game and helped Eilat reach the 2016 Israeli League Final Four.

=== Maccabi Haifa (2016–2017) ===
On July 7, 2016, Simhon signed with Maccabi Haifa for the 2016–17 season. On January 23, 2017, Simhon recorded a season-high 28 points, while shooting 7-of-10 from three-point range, along with six rebounds and three assists in a 94–73 win over Hapoel Gilboa Galil. He was subsequently named co-Israeli Round 15 MVP, alongside his teammate Oz Blayzer. That season, Simhon helped Haifa reach the 2017 Israeli League Finals, where they eventually lost to Hapoel Jerusalem.

=== Return to Hapoel Eilat (2017–2018) ===
On July 26, 2017, Simhon returned to Hapoel Eilat for a second stint, signing a one-year deal. On March 29, 2018, Simhon was named Israeli Player of the Month for games played in March. On April 16, 2018, Simhon recorded 21 points, shooting 9-of-15 from the field, along with 8 rebounds and 5 assists in a 90–81 win over Ironi Nes Ziona. He was subsequently named Israeli League Round 25 MVP. On June 1, 2018, Simhon scored a career-high 29 points along with 6 rebounds in a 100–88 playoff win over Hapoel Holon. He finished that season averaging 14.4 points, 3.9 rebounds and 1.5 assists per game. On June 8, 2018, Simhon earned a spot in the All-Israeli League First Team.

=== Hapoel Holon (2018–2019) ===
On July 4, 2018, Simhon joined Hapoel Holon, signing a two-year deal with an option for another one. Simhon helped Holon reach the 2019 FIBA Europe Cup Semifinals, where they eventually were eliminated by Dinamo Sassari.

=== Hapoel Be'er Sheva (2019–2020) ===
On December 26, 2019, Simhon parted ways with Hapoel Holon to join Hapoel Be'er Sheva for the rest of the season.

=== Hapoel Haifa (2020–present) ===
On August 4, 2020, Simhon signed with Hapoel Haifa of the Israeli National League.

== Israel national team ==
Simhon was a member of the Israeli Under-16 and Under-20 national teams.

Simhon also participated in the 2011 Summer Universiade and the 2015 European Games 3×3 Championship.
