= 2017 Israeli Basketball Super League Final Four =

2017 Israeli Final Four
- Season: 2016–17 Israeli Super League

Tournament details
- Arena: Menora Mivtachim Arena; Tel Aviv
- Dates: 12–15 June 2017

Final positions
- Champions: Hapoel Jerusalem (2nd title)
- Runners-up: Maccabi Haifa

Awards and statistics
- MVP: (United States) Jerome Dyson

The 2017 Israeli Final Four was the concluding tournament of the 2016–17 Israeli Basketball Super League. It was the eight Israeli Final Four. The Event was held in the Menora Mivtachim Arena in Tel Aviv, Israel between 12 and 15 June.

== Results ==
=== Bracket ===
Semi-finals; 12 June
Maccabi Tel Aviv	74
Maccabi Haifa	85
Maccabi Rishon LeZion	76
Hapoel Jerusalem	93

Final; 15 June
Maccabi Haifa	76
Hapoel Jerusalem	83

== Semi-finals ==
12 June 2017	Maccabi Rishon LeZion	76–93	Hapoel Jerusalem	Menora Mivtachim Arena, Tel Aviv
18:45	Scoring by quarter: 20–19, 19–23, 14–26, 23–25
Sport 5	Pts: Long 16; Rebs: Thomas 8 Asts: Ben Chimol 8	Boxscore	Pts: Dyson 23; Rebs: Eliyahu 12; Asts: Jerrels 8	Attendance: 10,200; Referees: Amit Balak, Kfir Mualem, Zahi Habdali

Starters:			Pts	Reb	Ast
G	11	(Israel) Avi Ben Chimol	9	2	8
G	4	(United States) Cameron Long	16	1	3
F	3	(United States) Patrick Richard	4	2	1
F	87	(Israel) Elishay Kadir	10	3	1
C	21	(United States) Charles Thomas	14	8	4
Reserves:					
G	6	(Israel) Nitzan Hanochi	0	1	1
F	8	(Israel) Shawn Dawson	5	3	1
G	10	(Israel) Oded Brandwein	7	1	2
F	14	(Israel) Ron Nekrashevich	2	0	0
C	20	(Israel) Idan Zalmanson	9	7	0
G	24	(Israel) Or Cornelius	0	0	0
F	44	(United States) J.J. Moore	0	1	0
Head coach:
(Israel) Shmulik Brenner

Rishon LeZion	Jerusalem

Starters:			Pts	Reb	Ast
G	55	(United States) Curtis Jerrells	15	2	8
G	2	(United States) Jerome Dyson	23	1	2
F	21	(United States) Tarence Kinsey	18	5	1
F	8	(Israel) Lior Eliyahu	6	12	2
C	14	(Israel) Richard Howell	18	7	1
Reserves:					
C	1	(United States) Amar'e Stoudemire	8	3	1
G	10	(Israel) Yotam Halperin	2	2	7
G	11	(Israel) Bar Timor	3	1	2
G	12	(Israel) Aviram Zelekovits	0	0	0
G	34	(Israel) Bar Shefa	0	0	0
F	42	(United States) Travis Peterson	0	0	0
C	91	(Israel) Isaac Rosefelt	DNP		
Head coach:
(Italy) Simone Pianigiani

12 June 2017	Maccabi Tel Aviv	74–85	Maccabi Haifa	Menora Mivtachim Arena, Tel Aviv
21:15	Scoring by quarter: 14–22, 16–17, 17–22, 27–24
Sport 5	Pts: Goudelock 24; Rebs: Segev 9 Asts: Seeley 4	Boxscore	Pts: Pinkney 20; Rebs: Pinkney 9 Asts: Vargas 8	Attendance: 9,600; Referees: Gili Cohen, David Romano, Elad Leibovich

Starters:			Pts	Reb	Ast
G	12	(Israel) Yogev Ohayon	4	0	0
G	0	(United States) Andrew Goudelock	24	1	3
F	3	(United States) Victor Rudd	10	2	2
F	30	(United States) Quincy Miller	2	3	0
C	23	(Israel) Joe Alexander	8	4	0
Reserves:					
G	4	(United States) D.J. Seeley	10	3	4
F	6	(United States) Devin Smith	0	3	0
G	9	(Israel) Gal Mekel	12	2	3
F	10	(Israel) Guy Pnini	0	0	1
C	11	(Israel) Itay Segev	4	9	1
F	8	(Israel) Nimrod Levi	DNP		
F	15	(Israel) Sylven Landesberg	DNP		
Head coach:
(Israel) Arik Shivek

Tel Aviv	Haifa

Starters:			Pts	Reb	Ast
G	16	(Venezuela) Gregory Vargas	14	8	8
G	33	(Mexico) Orlando Mendez	4	2	3
F	8	(Israel) Amit Simhon	10	5	3
F	14	(Israel) Oz Blayzer	9	1	2
C	21	(United States) Kevinn Pinkney	20	9	1
Reserves:					
F	1	(Israel) Willy Workman	9	7	0
C	7	(United States) Rashaun Freeman	0	1	0
G	12	(Israel) John DiBartolomeo	19	3	2
F	4	(Israel) Netanel Artzi	DNP		
C	5	(Israel) Anton Shoutvin	DNP		
G	6	(Israel) Nir Sarid	DNP		
C	10	(Israel) Daniel Koperberg	DNP		
Head coach:
(Israel) Offer Rahimi

=== Final ===
15 June 2017	Hapoel Jerusalem	83–76	Maccabi Haifa	Menora Mivtachim Arena, Tel Aviv
21:00	Scoring by quarter: 13-14, 28-27, 24-11, 18-24
Sport 5	Pts: Dyson 30; Rebs: Eliyahu 8 Asts: Jerrells & Dyson 5	Boxscore	Pts: Vargas 30; Rebs: Workman 8 Asts: Vargas 6	Attendance: 10,383; Referees: Sefi Shemesh, Omer Esteron, Ofer Manheim

Starters:			Pts	Reb	Ast
G	55	(United States) Curtis Jerrells	21	1	5
G	2	(United States) Jerome Dyson	30	6	5
F	21	(United States) Tarence Kinsey	19	5	2
F	8	(Israel) Lior Eliyahu	1	8	2
C	14	(Israel) Richard Howell	6	5	0
Reserves:					
C	1	(United States) Amar'e Stoudemire	6	7	0
G	10	(Israel) Yotam Halperin	0	0	1
G	11	(Israel) Bar Timor	0	0	0
F	42	(United States) Travis Peterson	0	0	0
G	12	(Israel) Aviram Zelekovits	DNP		
G	34	(Israel) Bar Shefa	DNP		
C	91	(Israel) Isaac Rosefelt	DNP		
Head coach:
(Italy) Simone Pianigiani

Jerusalem	Haifa

Starters:			Pts	Reb	Ast
G	16	(Venezuela) Gregory Vargas	30	4	6
G	33	(Mexico) Orlando Mendez	14	4	2
F	8	(Israel) Amit Simhon	1	4	2
F	14	(Israel) Oz Blayzer	4	1	0
C	21	(United States) Kevinn Pinkney	14	4	1
Reserves:					
F	1	(Israel) Willy Workman	8	8	1
C	7	(United States) Rashaun Freeman	0	1	1
G	12	(Israel) John DiBartolomeo	6	3	1
F	4	(Israel) Netanel Artzi	DNP		
C	5	(Israel) Anton Shoutvin	DNP		
G	6	(Israel) Nir Sarid	DNP		
C	10	(Israel) Daniel Koperberg	DNP		
Head coach:
(Israel) Offer Rahimi

== Winning roster ==
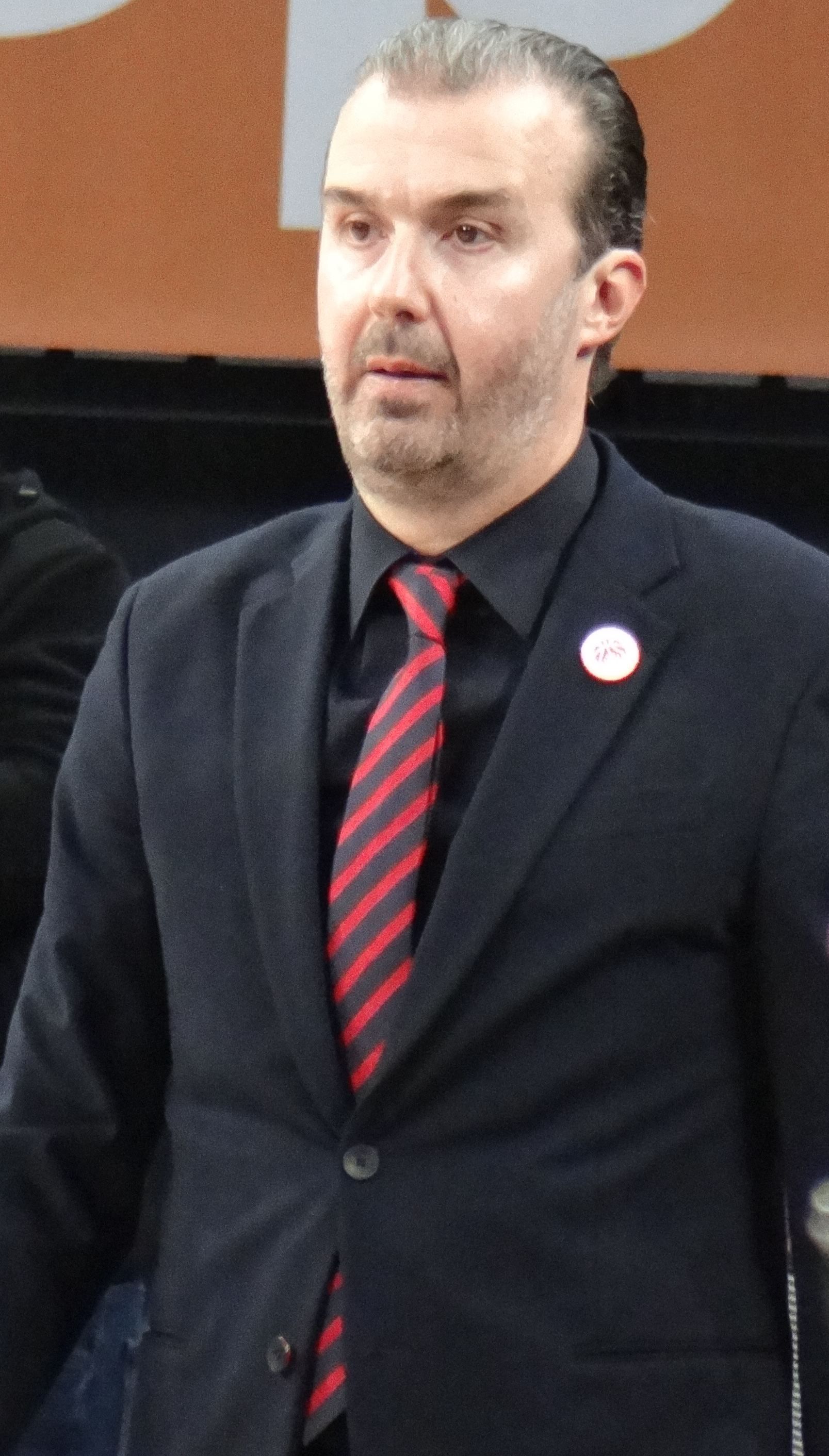
Head coach Simone Pianigiani

Hapoel Jerusalem roster
Players
Coaches

Pos.	No.	Nat.	Name	Ht.
C	1	(United States)	Stoudemire, Amar'e	2.11 m (6 ft 11 in)
G	2	(United States)	Dyson, Jerome	1.91 m (6 ft 3 in)
G	7	(Israel)	Ron, Or	1.85 m (6 ft 1 in)
PF	8	(Israel)	Eliyahu, Lior	2.05 m (6 ft 9 in)
SG	10	(Israel)	Halperin, Yotam (C)	1.95 m (6 ft 5 in)
PG	11	(Israel)	Timor, Bar	1.91 m (6 ft 3 in)
G	12	(Israel)	Zelekovits, Aviram	1.91 m (6 ft 3 in)
G	13	(Israel)	Moshkovitz, Michael	1.98 m (6 ft 6 in)
C	14	(United States) (Israel)	Howell, Richard	2.03 m (6 ft 8 in)
SF	21	(United States)	Kinsey, Tarence	2.00 m (6 ft 7 in)
G	34	(Israel)	Shefa, Bar	1.91 m (6 ft 3 in)
PF	42	(United States)	Peterson, Travis	2.08 m (6 ft 10 in)
PG	55	(United States)	Jerrells, Curtis	1.85 m (6 ft 1 in)
C	91	(United States) (Israel)	Rosefelt, Isaac	2.05 m (6 ft 9 in)

Head coach

- (Italy) Simone Pianigiani

Assistant coach(es)

- (Argentina) Marcelo Nicola
- (Israel) Modi Maor
- (United States) Ryan Pannone

Legend

- (C) Team captain
- Injured

- Roster
Updated: April 21, 2017
