= 2017–18 Israeli Basketball Premier League =

Israeli Basketball Premier League
- Season: 2017–18
- Dates: October 8, 2017 – June 14, 2018
- Teams: 12
- TV partner(s): Sports Channel

Regular season
- Season MVP: (Jamaica) Sek Henry
- Promoted: Hapoel Be'er Sheva
- Relegated: Maccabi Haifa

Finals
- Champions: Maccabi Tel Aviv (52nd title)
- Runners-up: Hapoel Holon
- Semifinalists: Hapoel Jerusalem; Hapoel Tel Aviv
- Finals MVP: (Israel) Alex Tyus

Awards
- Sixth Man: (Israel) Adrian Banks
- Rising Star: (Israel) Yovel Zoosman
- Best Defender: (Israel) Joaquin Szuchman
- Most Improved: (Israel) Nimrod Levi

Statistical leaders
Points	(United States) Glen Rice Jr.	24.3
Rebounds	(United States) Demetrius Treadwell	9.2
Assists	(Israel) Avi Ben Chimol	7.2
Index Rating	(United States) Glen Rice Jr.	29.9

The 2017–18 Israeli Basketball Premier League, for sponsorship reasons Ligat Winner, was the 64th season of the Israeli Basketball Premier League. Hapoel Jerusalem is the defending champion.

== Competition format ==
Twelve teams took part in the regular season, where they played against each other four times home-and-away in a double round-robin format. The first eight qualified teams advanced to the playoffs. The last qualified team was relegated to the Liga Leumit. The regular season started 8 October 2017.

== Teams ==
Teams 2017–18

Ironi Nes Ziona has been promoted to the league after winning 2016–17 National League, and comes back just one year after their relegation. Maccabi Kiryat Gat, who finished in last place during the 2016–17 season, relegated to the Liga Leumit

=== Stadia and locations ===
Team	Home city	Stadium	Capacity
Bnei Herzliya	Herzliya	HaYovel Herzliya	1,500
Hapoel Eilat	Eilat	Begin Arena	1,490
Hapoel Gilboa Galil	Gilboa Regional Council	Gan Ner Sports Hall	2,100
Hapoel Holon	Holon	Holon Toto Hall	5,500
Hapoel Jerusalem	Jerusalem	Pais Arena	11,000
Hapoel Tel Aviv	Tel Aviv	Drive in Arena	3,504
Ironi Nahariya	Nahariya	Ein Sarah	2,500
Ironi Nes Ziona	Ness Ziona	Lev Hamoshava	1,200
Maccabi Ashdod	Ashdod	HaKiriya Arena	2,200
Maccabi Haifa	Haifa	Romema Arena	5,000
Maccabi Rishon LeZion	Rishon LeZion	Beit Maccabi Rishon	2,500
Maccabi Tel Aviv	Tel Aviv	Menora Mivtachim Arena	10,383

=== Personnel and sponsorship ===
Team	Chairman	Head coach	Kit manufacturer	Shirt sponsor
Bnei Herzliya	(Israel) Eldad Akunis	(Israel) Arik Shivek	Peak	Rav-Bariach
Hapoel Eilat	(Israel) Motti Amsalem	(Israel) Sharon Drucker	And1	Fattal
Hapoel Gilboa Galil	(Israel) Haim Ohayon	(Israel) Ariel Beit-Halahmy	Peak	
Hapoel Holon	(Israel) Eitan Lanciano	(Israel) Dan Shamir	Peak	UNET
Hapoel Jerusalem	(Israel) Ori Allon	(Israel) Oded Kattash	Macron	Bank Yahav
Hapoel Tel Aviv	(Israel) Rami Cohen	(Israel) Danny Franco	Peak	SP
Ironi Nahariya	(Israel) Nissim Alfasi	(Israel) Eric Alfasi	Peak	
Ironi Nes Ziona	(Israel) Tomer Yamin	(Israel) Nadav Zilberstein	Kappa	Hai Motors
Maccabi Ashdod	(Israel) Meir Kikoz	(United States) Brad Greenberg	And1	Kaplan Medical Center
Maccabi Haifa	(United States) Jeff Rosen	(Israel) Barak Peleg	Peak	Hunter
Maccabi Rishon LeZion	(Israel) Itzhak Peri	(Israel) Zvika Sherf	Under Armour	ILAND.TV
Maccabi Tel Aviv	(Israel) Shimon Mizrahi	(Croatia) Neven Spahija	Nike	FOX

=== Managerial changes ===
Departure date	Team	Outgoing head coach	Reason	Hire date	Incoming head coach	Ref.
November 9, 2017	Hapoel Jerusalem	(Greece) Fotios Katsikaris	Fired	November 9, 2017	(Israel) Modi Maor	
November 14, 2017	Hapoel Eilat	(Israel) Meir Tapiro	Fired	November 18, 2017	(Israel) Sharon Drucker	
December 5, 2017	Bnei Herzliya	(Israel) Mickey Gorka	Fired	December 20, 2017	(Israel) Arik Shivek	
February 22, 2018	Hapoel Jerusalem	(Israel) Modi Maor	Fired	February 22, 2018	(Israel) Oded Kattash	
April 10, 2018	Maccabi Rishon LeZion	(Israel) Shmulik Brener	Fired	April 10, 2018	(Israel) Zvika Sherf	
April 22, 2018	Maccabi Haifa	(Israel) Offer Rahimi	Resigned	April 27, 2018	(Israel) Barak Peleg	

== Regular season ==
In the regular season, teams play against each other at least three times home-and-away in double a round-robin format. The six first qualified teams advance to the playoffs. The regular season started on 8 October 2017.

=== Standings ===
Pos	Team	Pld	W	L	PF	PA	PD	Pts	Qualification or relegation
1	Maccabi Tel Aviv	33	23	10	2816	2620	+196	56	Advance to play-offs
2	Hapoel Holon	33	22	11	2895	2792	+103	55	Advance to play-offs
3	Hapoel Jerusalem	33	21	12	2738	2614	+124	54	Advance to play-offs
4	Maccabi Ashdod	33	20	13	2722	2605	+117	53	Advance to play-offs
5	Hapoel Tel Aviv	33	19	14	2756	2717	+39	52	Advance to play-offs
6	Hapoel Gilboa Galil	33	17	16	2749	2792	−43	50	Advance to play-offs
7	Hapoel Eilat	33	16	17	2559	2613	−54	49	Advance to play-offs
8	Ironi Nes Ziona	33	13	20	2704	2788	−84	46	Advance to play-offs
9	Ironi Nahariya	33	13	20	2689	2760	−71	46	
10	Bnei Herzliya	33	12	21	2612	2775	−163	45	
11	Maccabi Rishon LeZion	33	11	22	2757	2792	−35	44	
12	Maccabi Haifa (R)	33	11	22	2560	2689	−129	44	Relegation to Liga Leumit

Source: Basket.co.il
(R) Relegated

== Players strike ==
On May 22, 2018, the Israeli Basketball Players Association announced a strike after the league introduced a rule, which enforced the teams to have at least two Israeli players on court at the same time. On May 24, the league announced that the season would be ended with one regular season game remaining and that no playoffs would be held due to the ongoing strike.

However, on May 25, 2018, the Israeli League Management have reached an agreement with the Israeli Basketball Players Association and the strike ended.

== Play-offs ==
Team 1	Series	Team 2	Game 1	Game 2	Game 3	Game 4	Game 5
Maccabi Tel Aviv	3–1	Ironi Nes Ziona	94–62	94–95	102–93	96–79	-
Maccabi Ashdod	1–3	Hapoel Tel Aviv	91–86	77–98	78–99	74–79	-
Hapoel Jerusalem	3–1	Hapoel Gilboa Galil	78–85	93–85	107–105	99–74	-
Hapoel Holon	3–2	Hapoel Eilat	89–83	86–100	87–81	70-87	82-71

Source: Ligat Winner

== Final Four ==
Semifinals
June 10
Maccabi Tel Aviv	98
Hapoel Tel Aviv	74
June 11
Hapoel Holon	80
Hapoel Jerusalem	76

Final
June 14
Maccabi Tel Aviv	95
Hapoel Holon	75

== Clubs in European competitions ==
Team	Competition	Progress	Ref
Maccabi Tel Aviv	EuroLeague	Regular season	
Hapoel Jerusalem	EuroCup	Regular season	
Hapoel Holon	Champions League	Regular season	
Bnei Herzliya	FIBA Europe Cup	Regular season	

== Final standings ==
Pos	Team	Qualification or relegation
1	Maccabi Tel Aviv	Automatically qualified for 2018–19 EuroLeague
2	Hapoel Holon	Qualified for 2018–19 Basketball Champions League
3	Hapoel Jerusalem	Qualified for 2018–19 Basketball Champions League
4	Hapoel Tel Aviv	Qualified for 2018–19 Basketball Champions League
5	Maccabi Ashdod	
6	Hapoel Gilboa Galil	
7	Hapoel Eilat	
8	Ironi Nes Ziona	Qualified for 2018–19 FIBA Europe Cup
9	Ironi Nahariya	
10	Bnei Herzliya	
11	Maccabi Rishon LeZion	
12	Maccabi Haifa	Relegated to the Ligat Leumit

== All-Star Game ==
The 2018 Israeli League All-star event was held on March 2, 2018, at the Menora Mivtachim Arena in Tel Aviv.

The International team won the game 137–122. The MVP of the game was Pierre Jackson who scored 18 points along with 6 assists.

Corey Webster won the Three-Point Shootout and Jaron Johnson won the Slam Dunk Contest.

=== Rosters ===
Israeli All-Stars
Pos	Player	Team
Starters
G	(Israel) Tamir Blatt	Hapoel Holon
G	(United States) (Israel) Adrian Banks	Hapoel Tel Aviv
F	(Israel) Shawn Dawson	Bnei Herzliya
F	(Israel) Amit Simhon	Hapoel Eilat
C	(United States) (Israel) Alex Tyus	Maccabi Tel Aviv
Reserves
G	(Israel) Yiftach Ziv	Ironi Nahariya
G	(Israel) Avi Ben-Chimol	Maccabi Rishon LeZion
G	(Israel) Joaquin Szuchman	Hapoel Gilboa Galil
F	(United States) (Israel) Willy Workman ^{REP}	Maccabi Haifa
F	(Israel) Nimrod Levi	Maccabi Ashdod
F/C	(Israel) Elishay Kadir	Ironi Nes Ziona
C	(United States) (Israel) Richard Howell	Hapoel Jerusalem
F	(Israel) Oz Blayzer ^{INJ}	Maccabi Haifa
Head coach: (Israel) Dan Shamir (Hapoel Holon)
Head coach: (Israel) Ariel Beit-Halahmy (Hapoel Gilboa Galil)

International All-Stars
Pos	Player	Team
Starters
G	(United States) Pierre Jackson	Maccabi Tel Aviv
G	(United States) Jerome Dyson	Hapoel Jerusalem
F	(United States) Glen Rice Jr.	Hapoel Holon
F	(United States) Tony Gaffney	Hapoel Tel Aviv
F/C	(United States) Zach LeDay	Hapoel Gilboa Galil
Reserves
G	(United States) Jordan Loyd ^{REP1}	Hapoel Eilat
G	(United States) Khalif Wyatt	Ironi Nes Ziona
G	(United States) (Jamaica) Sek Henry ^{REP2}	Maccabi Ashdod
G	(United States) Jason Siggers	Maccabi Rishon LeZion
F	(United States) Alex Young	Ironi Nahariya
F/C	(United States) Brandon Bowman	Maccabi Haifa
F/C	(United States) Jeff Adrien	Bnei Herzliya
G	(United States) Derwin Kitchen ^{INJ1}	Hapoel Eilat
F	(United States) David Laury ^{INJ2}	Maccabi Ashdod
Head coach: (Croatia) Neven Spahija (Maccabi Tel Aviv)
Head coach: (United States) Brad Greenberg (Maccabi Ashdod)

=== Game ===
March 2, 2018	Israeli All-Stars	122–137	International All-Stars	Tel Aviv
14:00	Scoring by quarter: 27-34, 28-41, 36-20, 31-42
Sport 5	Pts: Kadir 26; Rebs: Tyus & Kadir 9 Asts: Blatt & Ben Chimol 8 PIR: Kadir 31	Box Score; Report	Pts: LeDay 19; Rebs: Gaffney & Dyson 8 Asts: Jackson 6 PIR: Gaffney 24	Arena: Menora Mivtachim Arena; Attendance: 11,000; Referees: Eyal Porhiles, Lior Beinish, Rotem Koza

=== Three-point shootout ===
Contestants
Pos.	Player	Team	1st round	Final round
G	(New Zealand) Corey Webster	Ironi Nahariya	16	22
F	(Israel) Guy Pnini	Hapoel Holon	20	15
G	(Israel) Tamir Blatt ^{REP}	Hapoel Holon	17	15
G	(United States) (Israel) John DiBartolomeo	Maccabi Tel Aviv	15	-
F	(Israel) Amit Simhon	Hapoel Eilat	14	-
G	(United States) Jerome Dyson	Hapoel Jerusalem	8	-
G	(United States) Khalif Wyatt	Ironi Nes Ziona	8	-
G	(Israel) Or Cohen	Hapoel Jerusalem (Youth)	8	-
F	(Sweden) (Israel) Jonathan Skjöldebrand ^{INJ}	Ironi Nahariya	-	-

Source: Basket.co.il

=== Slam Dunk Contest ===
Contestants
Pos.	Player	Team	1st round	2nd round	Final round
F	(United States) Jaron Johnson	Ironi Nes Ziona	40	40	39
G	(United States) (Israel) Adrian Banks	Hapoel Tel Aviv	40	40	36
G	(United States) (Jamaica) Sek Henry	Maccabi Ashdod	37	-	-
F/C	(United States) Zach LeDay	Hapoel Gilboa Galil	34	-	-

Source: Basket.co.il

== Statistical leaders ==
=== Points ===
Pos	Player	Club	PPG
1	(United States) Glen Rice Jr.	Hapoel Holon	24.3
2	(United States) Zach LeDay	Hapoel Gilboa Galil	19.5
3	(United States) Jordan Loyd	Hapoel Eilat	17.4
4	(Jamaica) Sek Henry	Maccabi Ashdod	17.3
5	(United States) Jeff Adrien	Bnei Herzliya	17.2

=== Assists ===
Pos	Player	Club	APG
1	(Israel) Avi Ben-Chimol	Maccabi Rishon LeZion	7.2
2	(Jamaica) Sek Henry	Maccabi Ashdod	6.2
3	(United States) J'Covan Brown	Hapoel Gilboa Galil	5.9
4	(United States) Pierre Jackson	Maccabi Tel Aviv	5.3
5	(Puerto Rico) Ángel Rodríguez	Maccabi Haifa	4.7

=== Rebounds ===
Pos	Player	Club	RPG
1	(United States) Demetrius Treadwell	Hapoel Eilat	9.2
2	(Nigeria) Talib Zanna	Ironi Nes Ziona	8.9
3	(United States) Jeff Adrien	Bnei Herzliya	8.8
4	(United States) Murphy Holloway	Maccabi Rishon LeZion	8.5
5	(United States) Zach LeDay	Hapoel Gilboa Galil	8.2

=== Efficiency ===
Pos	Player	Club	PIR
1	(United States) Glen Rice Jr.	Hapoel Holon	29.9
2	(United States) Zach LeDay	Hapoel Gilboa Galil	23.0
3	(United States) Jeff Adrien	Bnei Herzliya	21.2
4	(United States) Murphy Holloway	Maccabi Rishon LeZion	20.1
5	(United States) Jordan Loyd	Hapoel Eilat	20.0

=== Other statistics ===
Category	Player	Team	Average
Steals	(Puerto Rico) Ángel Rodríguez	Maccabi Haifa	2.4
Blocks	(United States) Reginald Buckner	Maccabi Haifa	1.5
Turnovers	(Puerto Rico) Ángel Rodríguez	Maccabi Haifa	3.3
Minutes	(Israel) Amit Simhon	Hapoel Eilat	34:20
2P%	(Dominican Republic) Ronald Roberts	Hapoel Jerusalem	76.9%
3P%	(Israel) Yotam Halperin	Hapoel Jerusalem	48.5%
FT%	(United States) Corey Walden	Hapoel Holon	92.0%

Source: Basket.co.il

=== Individual game highs ===
Category	Player	Team	Total	Opponent
Points	(United States) Glen Rice Jr.	Hapoel Holon	43	Maccabi Ashdod (Nov 18, 17)
Rebounds	(United States) Zach LeDay	Hapoel Gilboa Galil	20	Hapoel Jerusalem (Dec 10, 17)
Assists	(Israel) Avi Ben-Chimol	Maccabi Rishon LeZion	16	Hapoel Tel Aviv (Apr 9, 18)
Steals	(United States) Pierre Jackson	Maccabi Tel Aviv	7	Ironi Nahariya (Dec 12, 17)
Blocks	(United States) (Israel) Joe Alexander	Hapoel Holon	6	Hapoel Jerusalem (Mar 24, 18)
Three Pointers	(United States) Jerome Dyson	Hapoel Jerusalem	8	Maccabi Rishon LeZion (Jan 15, 18)

Source: RealGM

== Awards ==
=== Yearly awards ===
==== Regular season MVP ====
Pos.	Player	Team
SG	(United States) (Jamaica) Sek Henry	Maccabi Ashdod

Source: basket.co.il

==== Finals MVP ====
Pos.	Player	Team
C	(United States) (Israel) Alex Tyus	Maccabi Tel Aviv

Source: basket.co.il

==== All-Israeli League Teams ====
First Team		Second Team	
Player	Team	Player	Team
(United States) Jerome Dyson	Hapoel Jerusalem	(United States) (Israel) John DiBartolomeo	Maccabi Tel Aviv
(United States) (Jamaica) Sek Henry	Maccabi Ashdod	(Israel) Joaquin Szuchman	Hapoel Gilboa Galil
(Israel) Amit Simhon	Hapoel Eilat	(United States) Jordan Loyd	Hapoel Eilat
(United States) (Israel) Joe Alexander	Hapoel Holon	(Israel) Tomer Ginat	Hapoel Tel Aviv
(United States) Zach LeDay	Hapoel Gilboa Galil	(United States) (Israel) Alex Tyus	Maccabi Tel Aviv

Source: basket.co.il

==== Coach of the Year ====
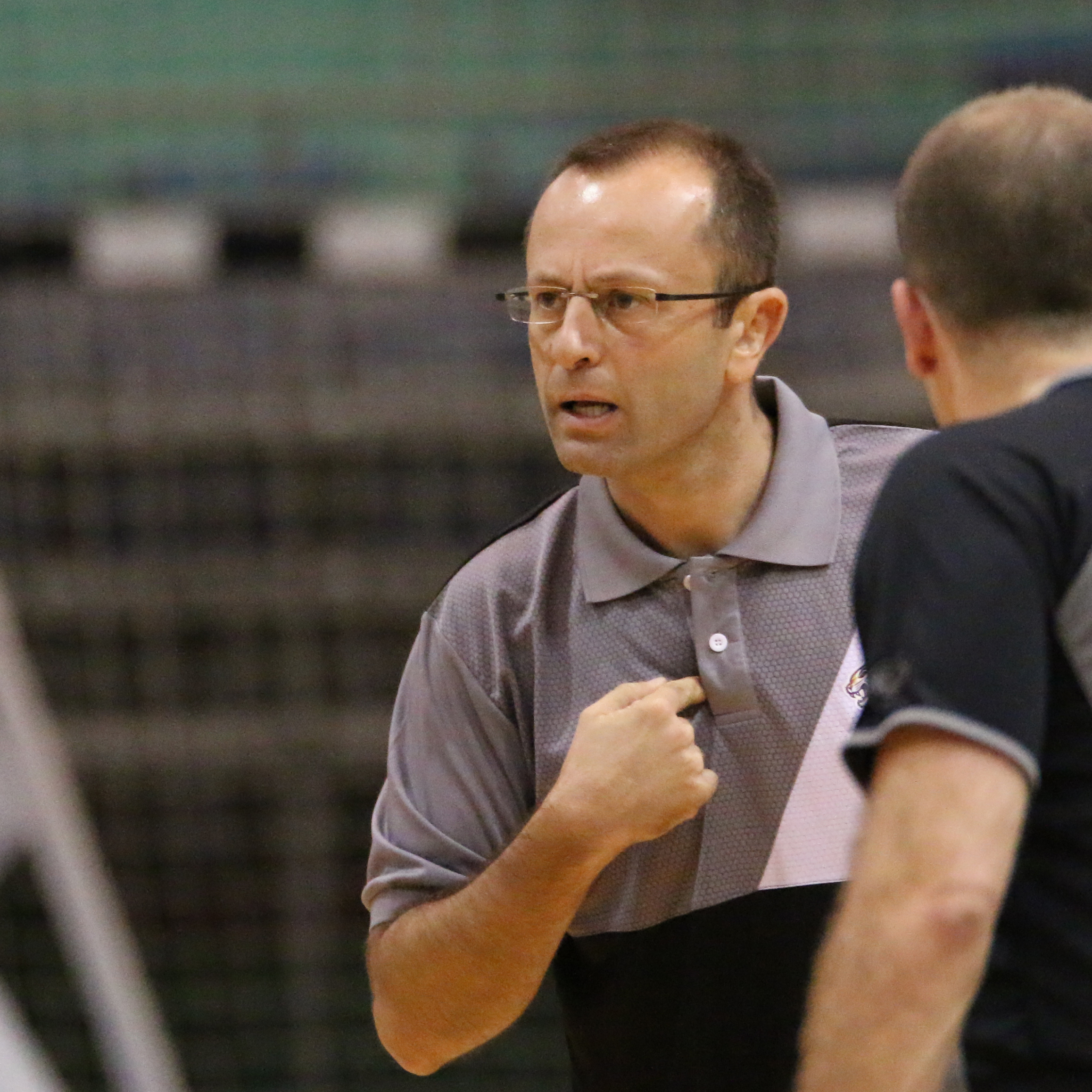
Dan Shamir

Coach	Team
(Israel) Dan Shamir	Hapoel Holon

Source: basket.co.il

==== Quarterfinals MVP ====
Pos.	Player	Team
PG	(United States) Jeremy Pargo	Maccabi Tel Aviv

Source: basket.co.il

==== Best Defender ====
Pos.	Player	Team
SG	(Israel) Joaquin Szuchman	Hapoel Gilboa Galil

Source: basket.co.il

==== Most Improved Player ====
Pos.	Player	Team
PF	(Israel) Nimrod Levi	Maccabi Ashdod

Source: basket.co.il

==== Sixth Man of the Year ====
Pos.	Player	Team
SG	(United States) (Israel) Adrian Banks	Hapoel Tel Aviv

Source: basket.co.il

==== Rising Star ====
Pos.	Player	Team
SG	(Israel) Yovel Zoosman	Maccabi Tel Aviv

Source: basket.co.il

=== Monthly Awards ===
==== Player of the Month ====
Month	Rounds	Player	Team	EFF	Ref
October	1–4	(United States) Alex Young	Ironi Nahariya	21.0	
November	5–7	(United States) Glen Rice Jr. (1/2)	Hapoel Holon	28.0	
December	8–10	(United States) Zach LeDay (1/2)	Hapoel Gilboa Galil	30.7	
January	11–15	(United States) (Jamaica) Sek Henry	Maccabi Ashdod	25.8	
February	16–17	(United States) Glen Rice Jr. (2/2)	Hapoel Holon	44.0	
March	18–21	(United States) Jeff Adrien	Bnei Herzliya	33.0	
April	22–27	(United States) Zach LeDay (2/2)	Hapoel Gilboa Galil	27.8	

==== Israeli Player of the Month ====
Month	Rounds	Player	Team	EFF	Ref
October	1–4	(Israel) Tomer Ginat (1/2)	Hapoel Tel Aviv	16.3	
November	5–7	(United States) (Israel) Joe Alexander	Hapoel Holon	23.3	
December	8–10	(Israel) Joaquin Szuchman	Hapoel Gilboa Galil	16.6	
January	11–15	(Israel) Nimrod Levi	Maccabi Ashdod	16.4	
February	16–17	(Israel) Guy Pnini	Hapoel Holon	9.3	
March	18–21	(Israel) Amit Simhon	Hapoel Eilat	14.8	
April	22–27	(Israel) Tomer Ginat (2/2)	Hapoel Tel Aviv	18.5	

==== Coach of the Month ====
Month	Rounds	Coach	Team	W-L	Ref
October	1–4	(Israel) Eric Alfasi	Ironi Nahariya	3–1	
November	5–7	(Israel) Dan Shamir (1/2)	Hapoel Holon	3–0	
December	8–10	(Israel) Ariel Beit-Halahmy (1/2)	Hapoel Gilboa Galil	3–0	
January	11–15	(United States) Brad Greenberg	Maccabi Ashdod	5–0	
February	16–17	(Israel) Dan Shamir (2/2)	Hapoel Holon	2–0	
March	18–21	(Israel) Nadav Zilberstein	Ironi Nes Ziona	3–1	
April	22–27	(Israel) Ariel Beit-Halahmy (2/2)	Hapoel Gilboa Galil	6–0	

=== MVP of the Round ===
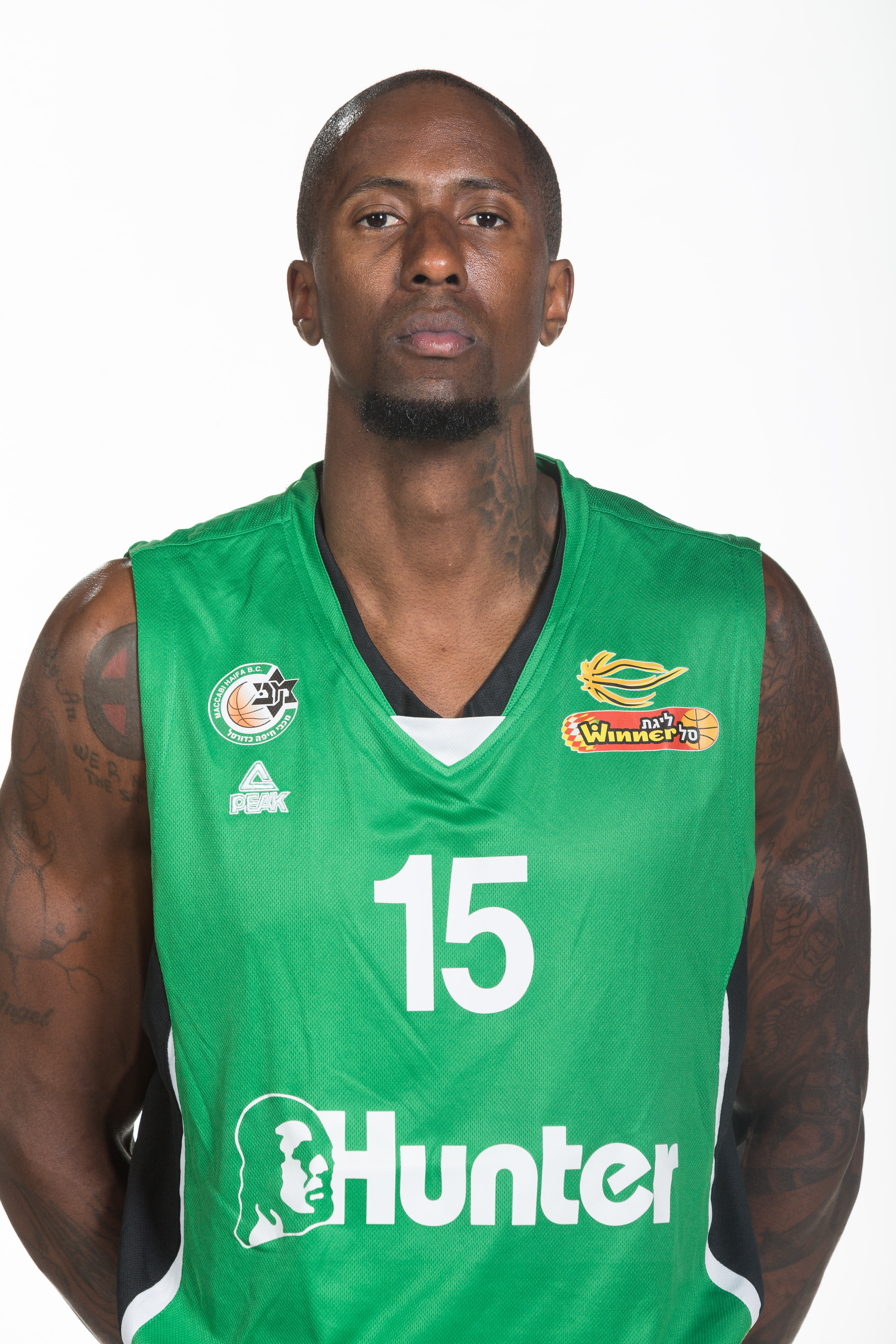
Brandon Bowman

Round	Player	Team	EFF	Ref.
October
1	(Israel) Tomer Ginat	Hapoel Tel Aviv	18	
2	(United States) Alex Young	Ironi Nahariya	22	
3	(United States) Brandon Bowman	Maccabi Haifa	26	
4	(United States) David Laury	Maccabi Ashdod	32	
4	(United States) (Jamaica) Sek Henry	Maccabi Ashdod	26	
November
5	(United States) Tyler Stone	Hapoel Gilboa Galil	40	
6	(United States) J'Covan Brown (1/2)	Hapoel Gilboa Galil	42	
7	(United States) Glen Rice Jr. (1/4)	Hapoel Holon	43	
December
8	(United States) Tony Gaffney	Hapoel Tel Aviv	36	
9	(United States) Zach LeDay	Hapoel Gilboa Galil	33	
10	(United States) Jerome Dyson (1/3)	Hapoel Jerusalem	29	
January
11	(United States) Jordan Loyd	Hapoel Eilat	43	
12	(United States) (Georgia (country)) Taurean Green	Bnei Herzliya	31	
13	(United States) Jerome Dyson (2/3)	Hapoel Jerusalem	27	
14	(United States) D'Angelo Harrison (1/2)	Hapoel Gilboa Galil	41	
15	(United States) Murphy Holloway (1/2)	Maccabi Rishon LeZion	35	
February
16	(United States) Glen Rice Jr. (2/4)	Hapoel Holon	42	
17	(United States) Glen Rice Jr. (3/4)	Hapoel Holon	46	
March
18	(United States) Khalif Wyatt	Ironi Nes Ziona	26	
19	(United States) Glen Rice Jr. (4/4)	Hapoel Holon	46	
20	(United States) Tu Holloway	Hapoel Holon	28	
21	(Israel) Oz Blayzer	Maccabi Haifa	34	
April
22	(Israel) Joaquin Szuchman	Hapoel Gilboa Galil	24	
23	(United States) J'Covan Brown (2/2)	Hapoel Gilboa Galil	38	
24	(United States) Murphy Holloway (2/2)	Maccabi Rishon LeZion	34	
25	(Israel) Amit Simhon	Hapoel Eilat	24	
26	(United States) Jerome Dyson (3/3)	Hapoel Jerusalem	21	
May
27	(United States) D'Angelo Harrison (2/2)	Hapoel Gilboa Galil	39	
28	(United States) (Israel) Joe Alexander	Hapoel Holon	41	
29	(United States) Cameron Long	Maccabi Ashdod	28	
30	(Israel) Lior Eliyahu	Hapoel Jerusalem	26	
31	(Israel) Shawn Dawson	Bnei Herzliya	28	
32	(United States) Jeremy Pargo	Maccabi Tel Aviv	30	
33	(United States) (Israel) Richard Howell	Hapoel Jerusalem	25	

== Average attendances ==
Included playoffs games.

Pos	Team	Total	High	Low	Average	Change
1	Hapoel Jerusalem	105,763	10,802	3,774	5,876	−9.2%
2	Maccabi Tel Aviv	86,650	8,000	2,205	4,814	−4.2%
3	Hapoel Holon	64,000	5,100	2,500	3,556	+8.9%
4	Hapoel Tel Aviv	51,422	3,536	900	2,857	−3.6%
5	Maccabi Haifa	32,009	3,487	500	2,001	−4.3%
6	Ironi Nahariya	31,350	2,500	1,600	1,959	+2.9%
7	Maccabi Rishon LeZion	24,500	2,200	600	1,531	−15.1%
8	Hapoel Gilboa Galil	22,300	2,100	850	1,312	+23.2%
9	Bnei Herzliya	18,100	1,400	700	1,131	−4.0%
10	Ironi Nes Ziona	19,650	1,300	650	1,092	−7.1%
11	Hapoel Eilat	16,400	1,300	550	965	−10.1%
12	Maccabi Ashdod	16,604	2,000	500	922	+6.5%
	League total	488,748	10,802	500	2,373	−7.9%

Updated to games played on 1 June 2018
Source: Israeli Basketball Super League

== See also ==
- 2017–18 Israeli Basketball State Cup
- 2017 Israeli Basketball League Cup
