= Jason Siggers =

American basketball player (born 1985)

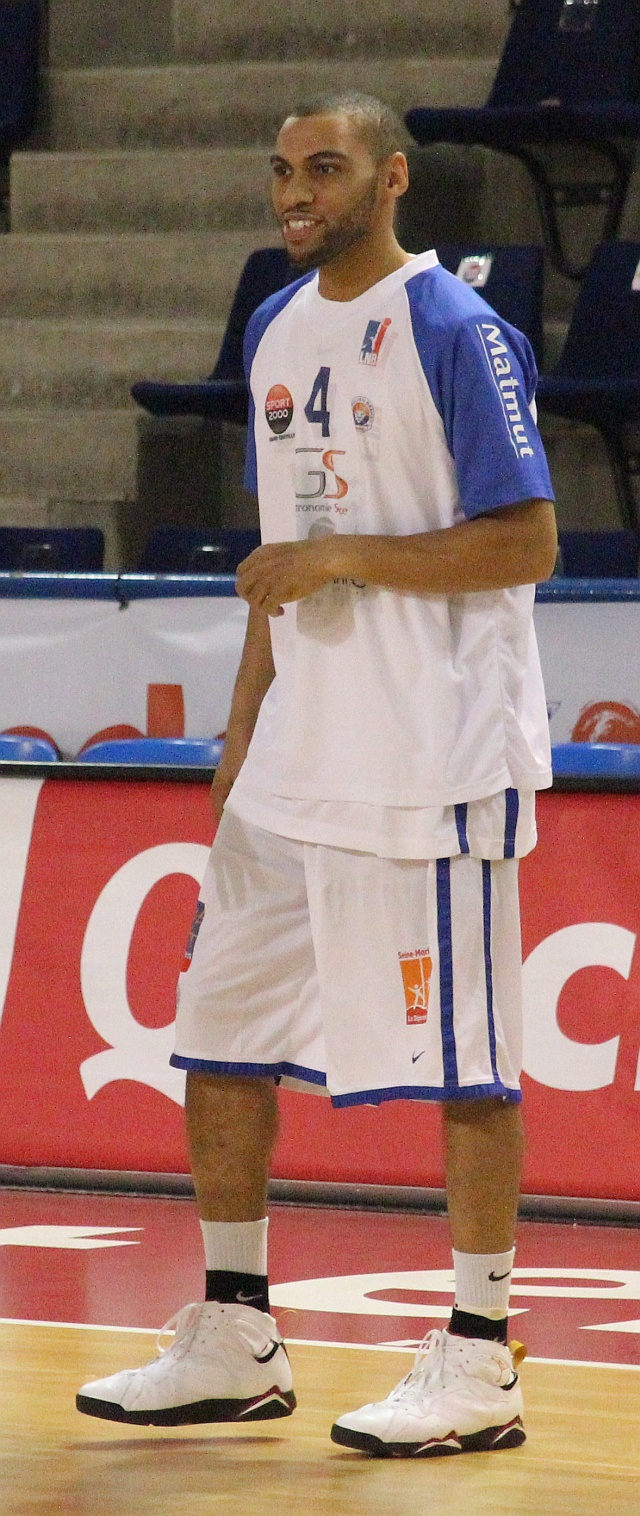
- Jason Siggers in 2011

Free agent
- Position: Shooting guard

Personal information
- Born: August 24, 1985 (age 41) Dallas, Texas, U.S.
- Listed height: 6 ft 4 in (1.93 m)
- Listed weight: 198 lb (90 kg)

Career information
- High school: Skyline (Dallas, Texas)
- College: New Mexico JC (2003–2005); Albany (2005–2007)
- NBA draft: 2007: undrafted
- Playing career: 2007–present

Career history
- 2007–2008: Bakken Bears
- 2008–2009: Boncourt
- 2009–2010: Lille MBC
- 2010–2012: Rouen Métropole
- 2012–2013: Lille MBC
- 2013: SIG Strasbourg
- 2013–2014: Boulazac Dordogne
- 2014–2015: Saint-Quentin
- 2015–2017: Hapoel Gilboa Galil
- 2017–2018: Maccabi Rishon LeZion
- 2018–2019: Goyang Orions
- 2019–2021: Hapoel Haifa
- 2021–2023: Maccabi Ra'anana

Career highlights
- Danish League champion (2008); Israeli National League champion (2016); Israeli National League MVP (2016); Israeli Premier League Sixth Man of the Year (2017); Israeli Premier League All-Star (2018); French Second Division Top Scorer (2012)

George Jason Siggers (born August 24, 1985) is an American professional basketball player. He played college basketball for New Mexico Junior College and University at Albany before playing professionally in Denmark, Switzerland, France, Israel and South Korea. He is the father of NBA player Keyonte George.

== Early life and college career ==
Siggers attended Skyline High School in Dallas, Texas. He played college basketball for New Mexico Junior College's Thunderbirds and University at Albany's Danes.

In his senior year in Albany, Siggers ranked eighth among the conference leaders in scoring with 14.2 points and third in free throw percentage with 82.9 percent. He also averaged 3.9 rebounds and 2.2 assists per game.

On March 27, 2007, Siggers was named America East First-Team and America East All-Tournament Team.

== Professional career ==
=== Early years (2007–2009) ===
On August 11, 2007, Siggers started his professional career with the Danish team Bakken Bears, signing a one-year deal. Siggers won the 2008 Basketligaen Championship title with the Bears.

In 2008, Siggers joined the Swiss team Boncourt for the 2008–09 season. On April 26, 2009, Siggers won the Slam Dunk Contest during the 2009 Swiss League All-Star Day.

=== France (2009–2015) ===
In 2009, Siggers signed with the French team Lille MBC of the LNB Pro B. On December 13, 2009, Siggers recorded a season-high 28 points in an 84–74 win over Nanterre.

On June 22, 2010, Siggers signed a two-year deal with Rouen Métropole. In his second season with Rouen, Siggers finished the season as the LNB Pro B top scorer with 18.5 points, to go with 4.1 rebounds, 2.6 assists and 1.1 steals per game, while shooting 41.2 percent from three-point range.

On June 6, 2012, Siggers returned to Lille MBC for a second stint, signing a two-year deal with an option for another one. On April 6, 2013, Siggers recorded career-highs of 34 points and 8 steals, shooting 13-of-17 from the field, along with four rebounds and two assists in a 95–76 win over Saint-Vallier. He was subsequently named the Pro B Round 30 MVP.

On April 21, 2013, Siggers parted ways with Lille to join SIG Strasbourg for the rest of the season, signing as an injury cover for Gerald Fitch. Siggers helped lead Strasbourg to the 2013 LNB Pro A Finals, where they eventually lost to Nanterre 92.

On June 24, 2013, Siggers signed with Boulazac Dordogne for the 2013–14 season.

On July 16, 2014, Siggers signed a one-year deal with Saint-Quentin. In 32 games played for Saint-Quentin, he averaged 14.4 points, 3.5 rebounds, 1.6 assists and 1.3 steals per game, shooting 40 percent from 3-point range.

=== Israel (2015–2018) ===
==== Hapoel Gilboa Galil (2015–2017) ====
On August 27, 2015, Siggers signed with the Israeli team Hapoel Gilboa Galil for the 2015–16 season. In 26 games played for Gilboa Galil, he averaged 19.7 points, 4.1 rebounds, 3.4 assists and 2.3 steals per game. On April 15, 2016, Siggers was named the National League Regular Season MVP. Siggers, alongside his teammates Demetrius Treadwell and Joaquin Szuchman, led Gilboa Galil to win the National League championship, earning a promotion to the Israeli Premier League after they defeated Ironi Kiryat Ata in the finals.

On August 17, 2016, Siggers signed a one-year contract extension with Gilboa Galil. On May 8, 2017, Siggers recorded a season-high 30 points, shooting 10-of-13 from the field, along with four rebounds, seven assists and five steals in a 95–85 win over Maccabi Ashdod. He was subsequently named Israeli League Round 31 MVP. On May 11, 2017, Siggers banked in a three-pointer at the buzzer and scored 27 points to give Gilboa Galil an 87–85 victory over Maccabi Tel Aviv. He was subsequently named Israeli League Round 32 MVP. In 33 games played during the 2016–17 season, he averaged 17 points, 4.3 rebounds, 2.7 assists and 1.5 steals per game. On June 9, 2017, Siggers was named the Israeli League Sixth Man of the Year.

==== Maccabi Rishon LeZion (2017–2018) ====
On July 22, 2017, Siggers signed a two-year deal with Maccabi Rishon LeZion. On March 2, 2018, Siggers participated in the 2018 Israeli League All-Star Game. On March 10, 2018, Siggers recorded a season-high 28 points, shooting 8-of-14 from the field, along with five rebounds, three assists and three steals in an 87–90 loss to Hapoel Tel Aviv. In 26 games played for Rishon LeZion, he averaged 14.3 points, 2.5 rebounds, 2.4 assists and 1 steal per game.

=== South Korea (2018–2019) ===
On November 18, 2018, Siggers signed with the Goyang Orions of the Korean Basketball League, replaced JeQuan Lewis.

On January 29, 2019, Siggers fractured his left hand and would be out for 8 weeks. On January 31, he was replaced by Josh Akognon.

=== Return to Israel (2019–2023) ===
On November 9, 2019, Siggers returned to Israel for a second stint, signing with Hapoel Haifa of the Israeli National League.
