= Israeli Basketball Premier League Discovery of the Year =

The Israeli Basketball Premier League Discovery of the Year, or Israeli Basketball Super League Discovery of the Year, is an award given to the best young player of each season of the Israeli Basketball Premier League, which is the top-tier level men's professional basketball league in Israel.

== Winners ==
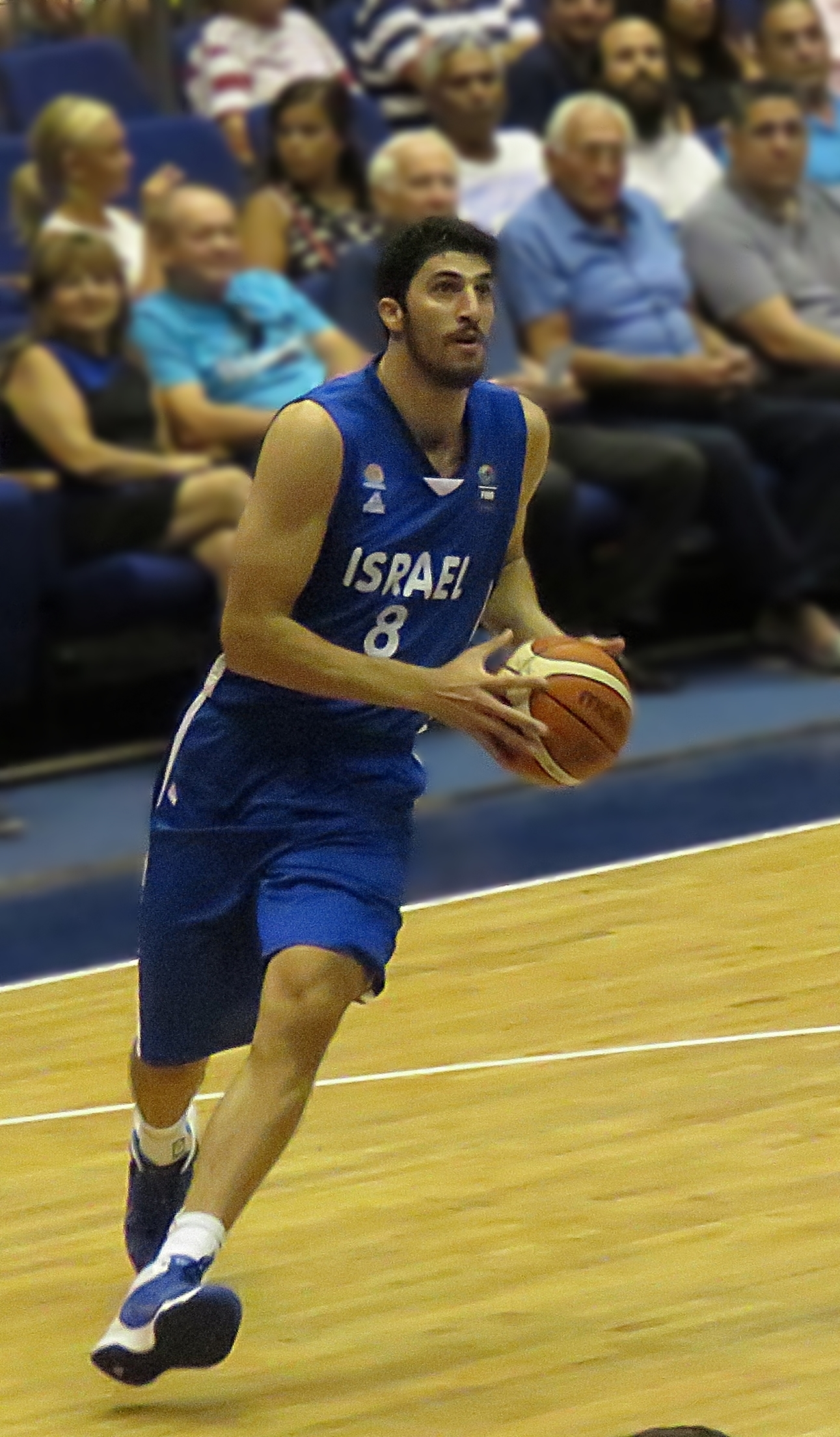
Lior Eliyahu

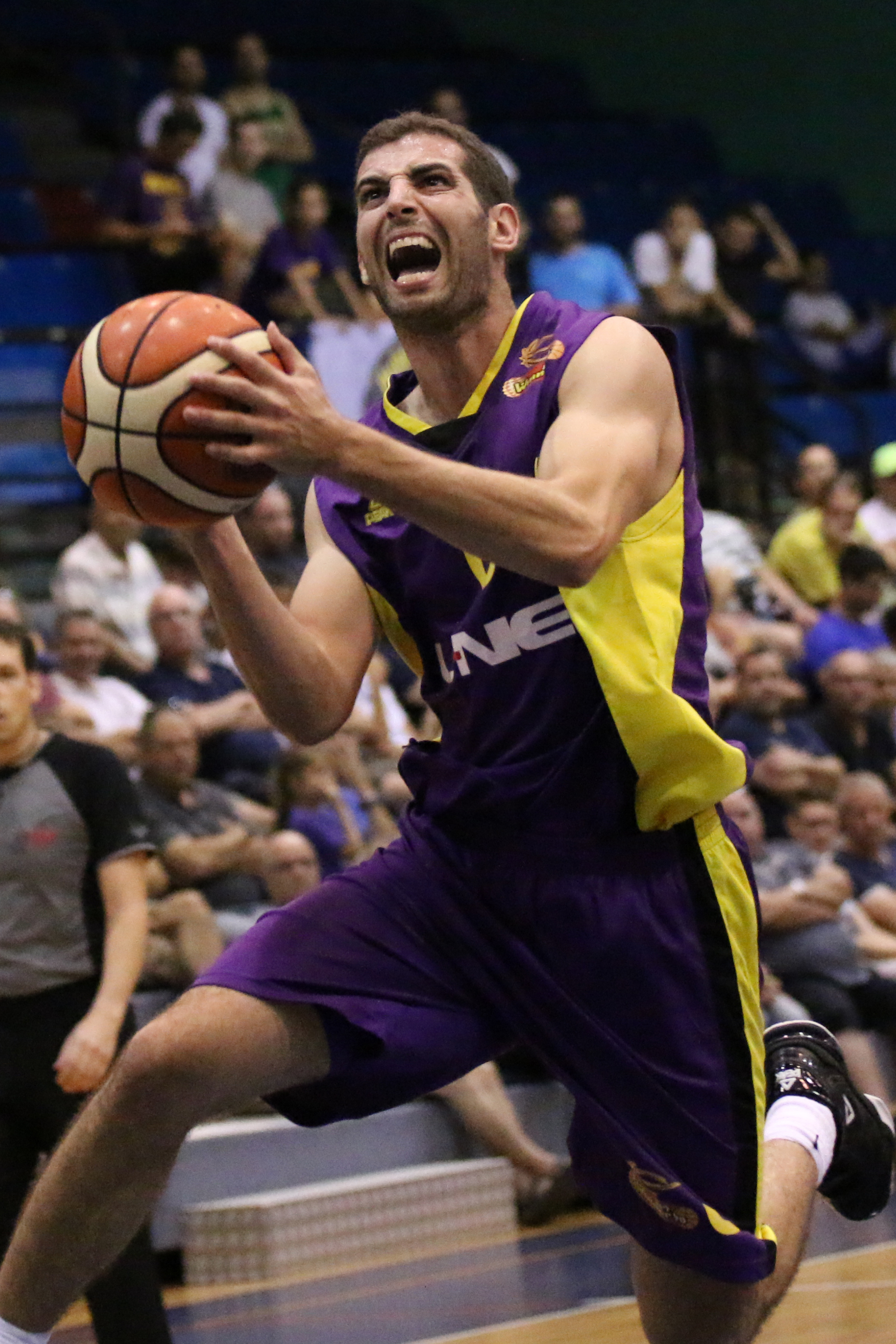
Guni Israeli

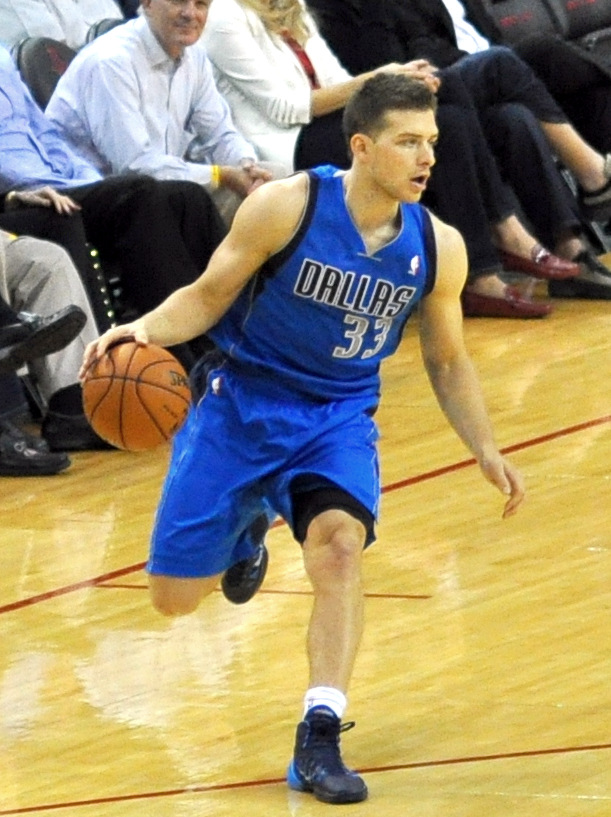
Gal Mekel

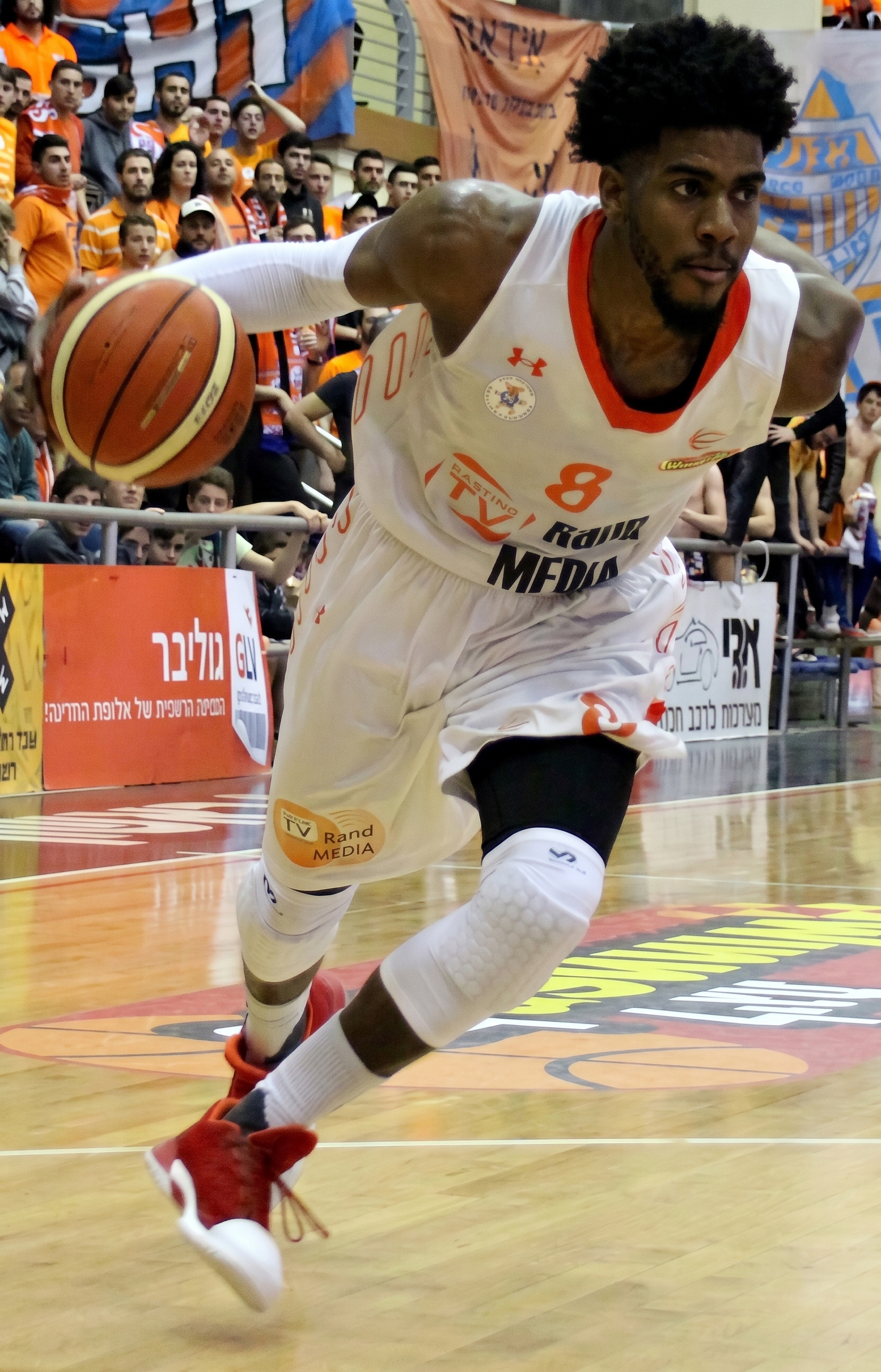
Shawn Dawson

Season	Discovery of the Year	Team	Ref
1989–90	(Israel) Koren Amisha	Maccabi Haifa	
1990–91	(Israel) Doron Sheffer	Hapoel Galil Elyon	
1991–92	(Israel) Kobi Balul	Hapoel Holon	
1992–93	(Israel) Yuval Ashkenazi	Hapoel Givatayim	
1993–94	(Israel) Oded Kattash	Ironi Ramat Gan	
1994–95	(Israel) Gil Sela	Hapoel Gvat/Yagur	
1995–96	(Israel) Yoav Saffar	Hapoel Holon	
1996–97	(United States) (Israel) Derrick Sharp	Maccabi Tel Aviv	
1997–98	(Israel) Tal Burstein	Bnei Herzliya	
1998–99	(Israel) Lior Lubin	Ironi Ramat Gan	
1999–00	(Israel) Afik Nissim	Maccabi Rishon LeZion	
2000–01	(Israel) Or Eitan	Ironi Kiryat Ata	
2001–02	(Israel) Oded Shaashoua	Ironi Ramat Gan	
2002–03	(United States) (Israel) David Bluthenthal	Maccabi Tel Aviv	
2002–03	(Israel) Raviv Limonad	Ironi Ramat Gan	
2003–04	(Israel) Lior Eliyahu	Hapoel Galil Elyon	
2004–05	(Israel) Moran Roth	A.S. Ramat HaSharon	
2005–06	(Israel) Yuval Naimy	Elitzur Givat Shmuel	
2006–07	(Israel) Guni Israeli	Hapoel Galil Elyon	
2007–08	(Israel) Nir Cohen	Ironi Ramat Gan	
2008–09	(Israel) Gal Mekel	Hapoel Gilboa Galil	
2009–10	(Israel) Dori Assaf	Bnei Herzliya	
2010–11	(Spain) (Israel) Jan Martín	Maccabi Ashdod	
2011–12	(Israel) (Argentina) Ezequiel Skverer	Elitzur Givat Shmuel	
2012–13	(Israel) Bar Timor	Hapoel Tel Aviv	
2013–14	(Israel) Oz Blayzer	Bnei Herzliya	
2013–14	(Israel) Aviram Zelekovits	Bnei Herzliya	
2014–15	(Israel) Shawn Dawson	Maccabi Rishon LeZion	
2015–16	(Israel) Karam Mashour	Bnei Herzliya	
2016–17	(Israel) Tomer Ginat	Hapoel Tel Aviv	
2017–18	(Israel) Yovel Zoosman	Maccabi Tel Aviv	
2018–19	(Israel) Amit Gershon	Hapoel Be'er Sheva	
2019–20	(Israel) Noam Dovrat	Maccabi Rishon LeZion	
2020–21	(Israel) Yair Kravitz	Bnei Herzliya	
2021–22	(Israel) Gabriel Chachashvili	Hapoel Galil Elyon	
2022–23	(Israel) Roy Paretsky	Hapoel Be'er Sheva	
2023–24	(Israel) Ben Saraf	Ironi Kiryat Ata	
2024–25	(Israel) Yuval Levin	Ironi Kiryat Ata	
2025–26	(Israel) Yuval Hochstadter	Ironi Kiryat Ata	
