= Tomer Ginat =

Israeli basketball player

No. 41 – Hapoel Tel Aviv
- Position: Power forward
- League: Israeli Basketball Premier League; EuroLeague

Personal information
- Born: November 7, 1994 (age 32) Gesher Haziv, Israel
- Listed height: 2.03 m (6 ft 8 in)
- Listed weight: 98 kg (216 lb)

Career information
- NBA draft: 2016: undrafted
- Playing career: 2013–present

Career history
- 2013–2014: Ironi Nahariya
- 2014–2016: Ironi Kiryat Ata
- 2016–2020: Hapoel Tel Aviv
- 2020–2022: Metropolitans 92
- 2022–present: Hapoel Tel Aviv

Career highlights
- EuroCup champion (2025); 4× All-Israeli Basketball Premier League First Team (2019, 2020, 2023, 2024); 2× Israeli Basketball Premier League MVP (2019, 2023); All-Israeli Basketball Premier League Second Team (2018); Israeli Basketball Premier League League Rising Star (2017); Liga Leumit Israeli MVP (2016)

Tomer Ginat (Hebrew: תומר גינת; born November 7, 1994) is an Israeli professional basketball player for Hapoel Tel Aviv of the Israeli Israeli Basketball Premier League and the EuroLeague. He is also a member of the Israeli national basketball team.

Ginat was named the Israeli Basketball Premier League Rising Star in 2017, to the All-Israeli Basketball Premier League Second Team in 2018, the Israeli Basketball Premier League MVP in 2019 and 2023, and a four-time All-Israeli Basketball Premier League First Team. He stands at 6 ft 8 in (2.03 m), and plays at the power forward position.

== Early life ==
Ginat was born and raised in Gesher Haziv, Israel, by his parents Iris and Eyal. He played for the Ironi Nahariya youth team.

== Professional career ==
=== Ironi Nahariya (2013–2014) ===
In 2013, Ginat started his professional career with Ironi Nahariya, playing in 15 regular season games, averaging 7.1 minutes, 3.0 points, and 1.7 rebounds per game.

=== Ironi Kiryat Ata (2014–2016) ===
In 2014, Ginat signed a two-year deal with Ironi Kiryat Ata of the Israeli National League. In 2014-15, he played in 26 games and averaged 23.4 minutes, 11.1 points, 7.2 rebounds, 1.2 assists, and 1.0 steals per game, while shooting 50.2% from the floor. In his second season with Kiryat Ata, in 2015-16, he averaged 30.7 minutes,16.4 points, 9.3 rebounds, 2.8 assists, and 1.5 steals per game, while shooting 51.3% from the field. He was named Liga Leumit Israeli MVP. Ginat helped the team reach the League Finals, where they eventually lost to Hapoel Gilboa Galil. He was named the National League Israeli Player of the Year.

=== Hapoel Tel Aviv (2016–2020) ===
==== 2016–17 season ====
On June 10, 2016, Ginat signed a three-year deal with Hapoel Tel Aviv. On March 11, 2017, Ginat recorded a season-high 23 points, shooting 10-for-15 from the field, along with 12 rebounds, in an 83–70 win over Hapoel Jerusalem. Three days later, Ginat was named Israeli League Player of the Week. In his first season with Hapoel, he averaged 22.0 minutes, 9.3 points, 5.7 rebounds, 1.4 assists, and 1.0 steals per game, while shooting 51.9% from the floor. On June 9, 2017, Ginat was named the Israeli Basketball Premier League Rising Star.

==== 2017–18 season ====
On May 28, 2017, Ginat signed a three-year contract extension with Hapoel Tel Aviv. On October 8, 2018, Ginat recorded a then career-high 15 rebounds, along with 14 points, in an 81–78 win over Hapoel Holon. He was subsequently named Israeli Basketball Premier League Round 1 MVP. In his second season with Hapoel, he averaged 23.0 minutes, 10.0 points, 5.8 rebounds, and 1.6 assists per game, while shooting 50.8% from the floor. Ginat was named two-time Israeli Basketball Premier League Player of the Month for games played in October and April, earning a spot in the All-Israeli Basketball Premier League Second Team. Ginat helped Hapoel reach the Israeli Basketball Premier League Final Four for the first time in 13 years.

==== 2018–19 season ====
On May 12, 2019, Ginat recorded a career-high 21 rebounds, along with 13 points and two steals in an 85–76 loss to Maccabi Tel Aviv. In his third season with Hapoel, he averaged 13.4 points, 7.1 rebounds (8th in the league), 1.9 assists and 1.4 steals (9th) per game, while shooting 48.7% from the floor. Ginat was named two-time Israeli Basketball Premier League Player of the Month for games played in November and February. He led Hapoel to the Israeli Basketball Premier League Playoffs, where they eventually were eliminated by Maccabi Tel Aviv in the Quarterfinals. Ginat was named 2019 Israeli Basketball Premier League MVP, and to the All-Israeli Basketball Premier League First Team.

==== 2019–20 season ====
On December 2, 2019, Ginat recorded a career-high 25 points, along with five rebounds and four assists in a 102–97 overtime win over Hapoel Be'er Sheva. In the 2019-20 season, in 32 games he averaged 30.9 minutes, a career-high 15.2 points (9th in the league), 6.3 rebounds, 2.6 assists, and 1.8 steals (4th) per game, while shooting 47.3% from the field.

=== Metropolitans 92 (2020–2022) ===
On June 10, 2020, he signed with Metropolitans 92 of LNB Pro A. In2020-21, in 36 games he averaged 25.5 minutes, 10.3 points, 4.6 rebounds, 2.3 assists, and 1.0 steals per game, while shooting 47.6% from the floor.

In 2021-22 for the team, in 48 games he averaged 24.1 minutes, 9.3 points, 5.2 rebounds, 1.9 assists, and 0.9 steals per game, while shooting 51.9% from the floor.

=== Return to Hapoel Tel Aviv (2022–present) ===
In June 2022 Ginat signed a five-year deal with Hapoel Tel Aviv of Israeli Basketball Premier League. In the 2022-23 season, in 52 games he averaged 24.9 minutes, 11.8 points, 6.0 rebounds, 1.6 assists, and 1.0 steals per game, while shooting 56.4% from the field. Ginat was named 2023 Israeli Basketball Premier League MVP].

In the 2023-24 season, in 50 games he averaged 27.2 minutes, 13.1 points, 5.7 rebounds, 2.0 assists, and 1.1 steals per game, while shooting 55.8% from the field, and 40.9% from three point range (leading the league). Ginat was named to the All-Israeli Basketball Premier League First Team.

In the 2024-25 season, in 55 games he averaged 23.4 minutes, 10.1 points, 5.8 rebounds, and 1.8 assists per game, while shooting 55.4% from the field.

On March 16, 2026, Ginat underwent surgery to address a lingering nerve compression issue in his right knee. He was ruled out for the regular season and remained in Israel to begin his rehabilitation. In the 2025-26 season, in 41 games he averaged 16.7 minutes, 6.2 points, 3.6 rebounds, and 1.3 assists per game, while shooting 52.7% from the field.

In July 2026, Ginat had his contract extended until the end of the 2029–2030 season.

== National team career ==
Ginat is a member of the Israeli national basketball team. On November 24, 2017, he made his first appearance for the senior team at the 2019 FIBA Basketball World Cup qualification match against Estonia.

Ginat was also a member of the Israeli U-20 national team. In August 2017, Ginat played in the 2017 Summer Universiade, where he averaged 14.2 points, 8.6 rebounds, and 2 assists per game as the team claimed 6th place in the tournament.
