= Shawn Dawson =

American-Israeli basketball player (born 1993)

Shawn Dawson שון דאוסון
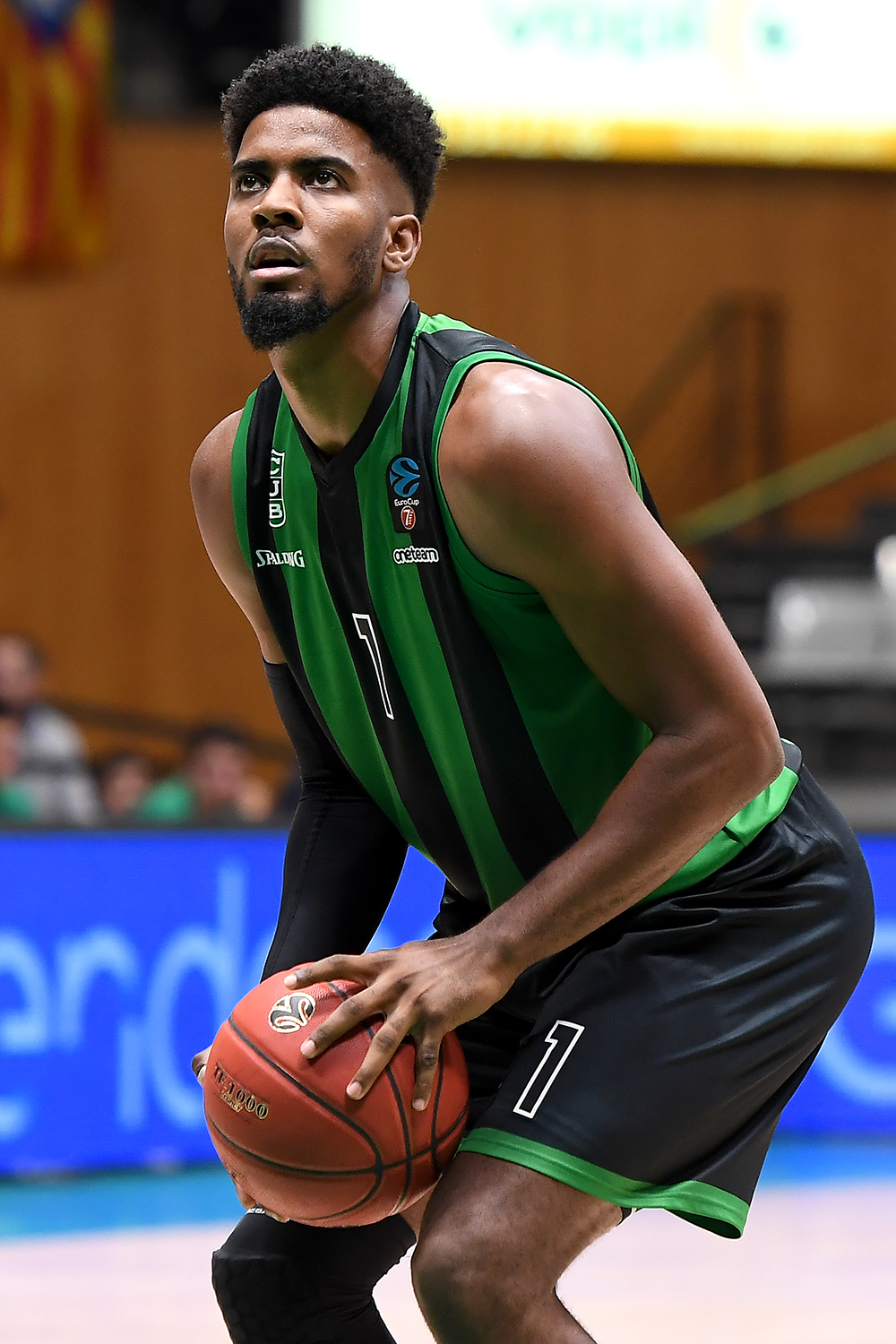
- Dawson in 2019

No. 8 – Maccabi Ashdod
- Position: Small forward / shooting guard
- League: Israeli Basketball Premier League

Personal information
- Born: 12 December 1993 (age 32) Eilat, Israel
- Listed height: 1.98 m (6 ft 6 in)
- Listed weight: 93 kg (205 lb)

Career information
- NBA draft: 2015: undrafted
- Playing career: 2012–present

Career history
- 2012–2017: Maccabi Rishon LeZion
- 2017–2018: Bnei Herzliya
- 2018–2021: Joventut
- 2021–2022: Bnei Herzliya
- 2022–2024: Hapoel Holon
- 2024–2025: Forlì
- 2025–2026: Bnei Herzliya
- 2026: Ironi Ness Ziona
- 2026–present: Maccabi Ashdod

Career highlights
- Israeli State Cup winner (2022); Israeli League champion (2016); 4× Israeli League All-Star (2015–2018); All-Israeli League First Team (2015); All-Israeli League Second Team (2016); Israeli League Rising Star (2015); Israeli League Most Improved Player (2014)
- Stats at Basketball Reference

Shawn Dawson (Hebrew: שון דאוסון; born 12 December 1993) is an American-Israeli professional basketball player for Maccabi Ashdod of the Israeli Basketball Premier League. A 1.98 m (6 ft 6 in) small forward and shooting guard, he is the son of former American-Israeli basketball player Joe Dawson.

He was named the Israeli Basketball Premier League Most Improved Player in 2014, the Israeli Basketball Premier League Rising Star and All-Israeli League First Team in 2015, and a 4× Israeli Basketball Premier League All-Star in 2015–2018. He has also played for the Israeli national basketball team.

== Early life ==
Dawson was born in Eilat, Israel. His father Joe Dawson is an American basketball player who played in Israel for more than 20 years, and acquired Israeli citizenship upon his marriage. His mother, Iris, is an Israeli woman of Yemenite-Jewish ancestry. His parents divorced when he was 7, and he lived with his mother in Eilat, Israel.

He played in Hapoel Eilat youth teams until he was 15, before moving to live with his father and his younger brother, Tyler, in Rehovot, Israel. He then joined the Maccabi Rishon LeZion youth team.

== Professional career ==
=== Maccabi Rishon LeZion (2012–2017) ===
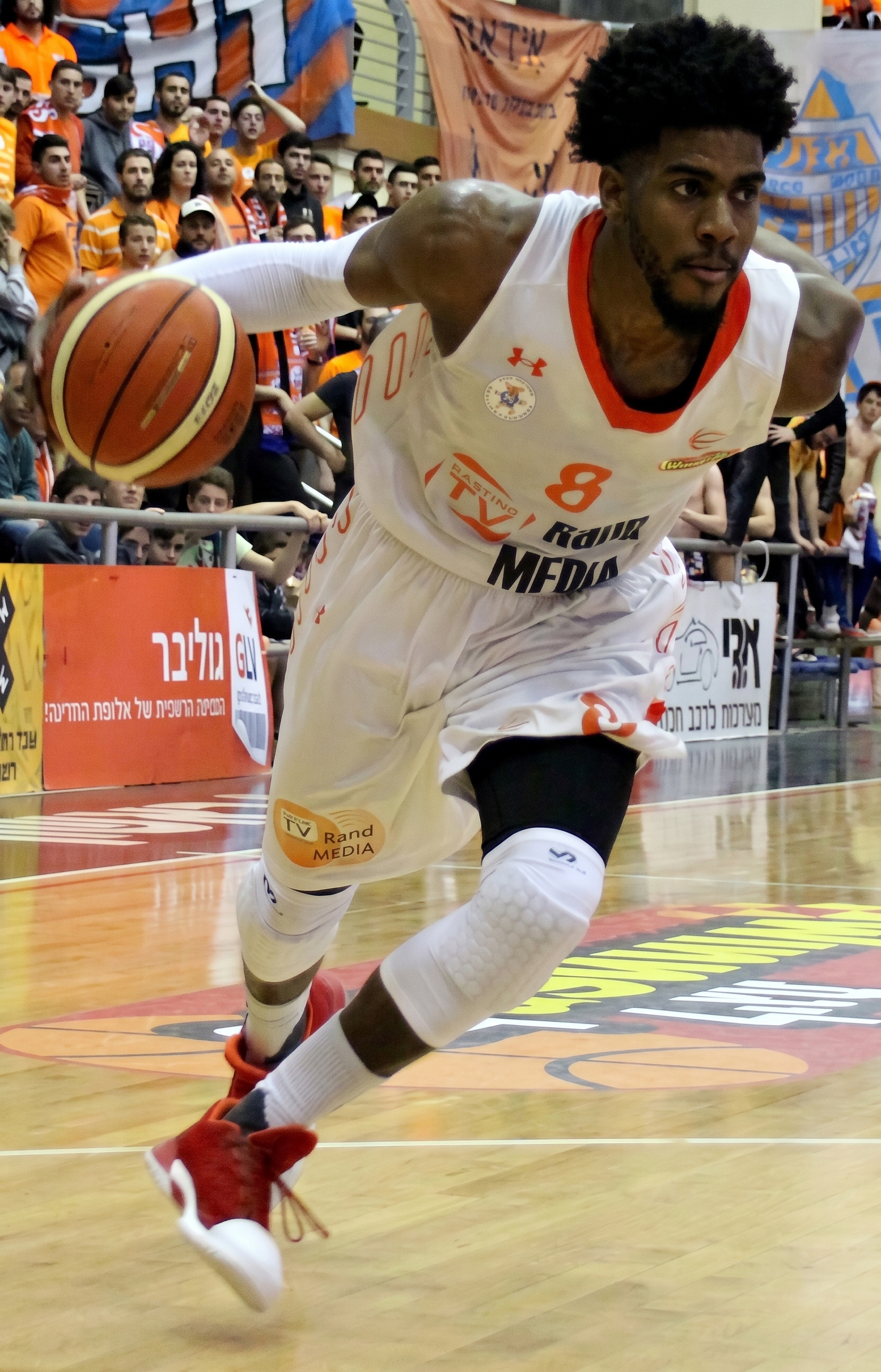
Dawson in 2017

In 2012, Dawson started his professional career with Maccabi Rishon LeZion, which plays in the Israeli Basketball Premier League. On 14 October 2012, Dawson made his professional debut in a 70–54 win over Hapoel Gilboa Galil, scoring two points off the bench. In 2012–13, at 18 years of age, he averaged 11.4 minutes, 3.8 points, 1.7 rebounds, and 0.5 assists per game in 24 games off the bench.

In 2013–14, he averaged 25.8 minutes,10.5 points, 5.2 rebounds, 1.4 assists, 1.1 steals, and 1.1 blocks (8th in the league) per game while shooting 45.7% from the field in 29 games, 23 of them starts. He was named the Israeli Basketball Super League Most Improved Player in 2014.

In 2014–15, he averaged 26.9 minutes,14.6 points, 5.9 rebounds, 2.2 assists, and 1.2 steals per game while shooting 48.4% from the field in 39 games,18 of them starts. Dawson helped the team to reach the 2015 Israeli League Semifinals, where they eventually were eliminated by Hapoel Jerusalem. Dawson was named 2015 All-Israeli League First Team, an All Star, and the 2015 Israeli League Rising Star.

On 9 May 2015, Dawson signed a two-year contract extension with Maccabi Rishon LeZion. On 9 June 2016, Dawson recorded 21 points, shooting 5-of-7 from three-point range, along with five rebounds, three assists and three steals and helped Rishon LeZion win the 2016 Israeli League Championship after an 83–77 win over Hapoel Jerusalem. In 2015–16, he averaged 30.1 minutes,13.8 points, 5.3 rebounds, 2.6 assists, and 1.6 steals (3rd in the league) per game while shooting 49.9% from the field in 54 games, 53 of them starts. He was named an All Star and All-Israeli Basketball Premier League Second Team.

In July 2016, Dawson joined the Washington Wizards for the 2016 NBA Summer League, in which he played four games, shooting 47% from the floor. On 12 August 2016, he signed with the New Orleans Pelicans of the NBA. However, he was later waived by the Pelicans on 21 October, after appearing in three preseason games with them.

On 24 October 2016, Dawson returned to Maccabi Rishon LeZion for the rest of the season. On 29 January 2017, Dawson recorded a career-high 31 points, shooting 12-of-20 from the field, along with seven rebounds, three assists and six steals in a 92–93 loss to Hapoel Gilboa Galil. Dawson helped Rishon LeZion reach the 2017 Israeli League Final Four, where they eventually lost to Hapoel Jerusalem. In 2016–17, he averaged 27.2 minutes,11.6 points, 5.2 rebounds, 1.9 assists, and 1.2 steals per game while shooting 49.9% from the field in 31games, 16 of them starts. He was named an All Star.

=== Bnei Herzliya (2017–2018) ===
On 18 July 2017, Dawson signed a two-year deal with Bnei Herzliya, which plays in the Israeli Basketball Premier League . On 6 December 2017, Dawson recorded a season-high 30 points, shooting 5-of-8 from three-point range, along with four rebounds and two assists in 87–83 win over Charleroi in the FIBA Europe Cup. On 14 May 2018, Dawson recorded 20 points along with seven rebounds, four assists and two steals in a 78–64 win over Maccabi Haifa. He was subsequently named Israeli League Round 31 MVP.

In 41 games he played during the 2017–18 season, 40 of which he started, he averaged 32.2 minutes, 15.6 points (9th in the league), 5.4 rebounds, 2.1 assists, and 1.1 steals per game, as he shot 45.8% from the field. He was named an All Star.

=== Divina Seguros Joventut (2018–2021) ===
In July 2018, Dawson joined the Brooklyn Nets for the 2018 NBA Summer League, where in five games he averaged 18.2 minutes, 11.2 points, 3.2 rebounds, and 1.6 assists per game while shooting 48% from the floor and 80% from the free throw line.

On 27 July 2018, Dawson signed a one-year deal with the Spanish team Divina Seguros Joventut of the Spanish ACB and the Eurocup for the 2018–19 season. On 28 October 2018, Dawson recorded a season-high 20 points, shooting 3-of-5 from three-point range, along with four rebounds and five assists in a 92–94 loss to Barcelona. On 27 January 2019, Dawson was ruled out for the rest of the season after he suffered an ACL injury in a match against Gran Canaria. In 18 games played during the 2018–19 season, he averaged 23.2 minutes, 11.7 points, 4.2 rebounds, and 1.5 assists per game, while shooting 49.0% from the floor, 40.0% from three-point range, and 81.8% from the free throw line.

On 28 February 2019, Dawson signed a one-year contract extension with Joventut. On 30 October 2019, Dawson suffered another season-ending injury in his season debut, after he ruptured his achilles in a EuroCup match against Cedevita Olimpija.

On 20 January 2020, Dawson signed a two-year contract extension with Joventut. In 34 games played during the 2020–21 season, five of which he started, he averaged 11.4 minutes, 4.6 points, 2.0 rebounds, and 0.6 assists per game.

He parted ways with the team on 16 June 2021.

=== Return to Bnei Herzliya (2021–2022) ===
On 23 August 2021, Dawson returned to Bnei Herzliya. In February 2022, he helped Bnei Herzliya win the Israeli State Cup, scoring 16 points in an 87–82 victory over Hapoel Tel Aviv in the final. In the 2021–22 season, he averaged 21.3 minutes, 9.0 points, 3.3 rebounds, and 1.8 assists per game, in 29 games, 10 of which he started.

=== Hapoel Holon (2022–2024) ===
In summer 2022, he signed with Hapoel Holon of the Israeli Basketball Premier League. In the 2022–23 season, he averaged 23.5 minutes, 10.3 points, 3.8 rebounds, and 1.8 assists per game as he shot 83.3% from the free throw line, in 38 games,16 of which he started.

In the 2023–24 season, he averaged 23.1 minutes, 9.1 points, 3.5 rebounds, and 2.8 assists per game in 39 games, 17 of which he started. Following the October 7 attacks on Israel and the outbreak of the Gaza war, Dawson spoke publicly in support of Israel after Hapoel Holon's Basketball Champions League win in Germany on 1 November 2023. Declining to discuss the game itself in his postgame interview, he stated that "there are things much more important than basketball," dedicated the victory "for our people," and added, "Never again and Am Yisrael Chai, and I want to send my condolences, love, and support to my country and to everyone who lost someone dear to them."

=== Forlì (2024–2025) ===
Dawson next played for Italian team Forli in the Serie A2 Basket. In 2024–25, he averaged 24.5 minutes, 11.5 points, 7.2 rebounds, and 3.0 assists per game as he shot 83.3% from the free throw line, in six games, five of which he started.

=== Second return to Bnei Herzliya (2025–2026) ===
On 6 October 2025, Dawson returned to Bnei Herzliya on a three-month contract. At the outset of the 2025–26 season, he averaged 21.9 minutes, 8.0 points, 2.9 rebounds, 3.4 assists, and 1.0 steals per game while shooting 47% from the floor and 45% from three-point range, in 17 games, 9 of which he started. On 11 Januart 2026, Dawson left Bnei Herzliya.

=== Ironi Ness Ziona (2026) ===
Dawson played for Ironi Ness Ziona of the Israeli Basketball Premier League for three games in the remainder of the 2025–26 season. He averaged 17.7minutes, 4.3 points, 2.0 rebounds, and 1.7 assists per game.

=== Maccabi Ashdod (2026–present) ===
Dawson signed with Maccabi Ashdod of the Israeli Basketball Premier League in July 2026.

== National team career ==
Dawson is a member of the Israeli national team. He played on the junior Team Israel in the 2013 FIBA Europe Under-20 Championship, averaging 13.3 minutes and 4.1 points per game in nine games.

He was then on the senior Team Israel in the 2014 Eurobasket Qualifier, and competed for the senior Team Israel in the 2015 and the 2017 Eurobasket tournaments, the 2017 Eurobasket Qualifier, and the 2021 Eurobasket Qualifier, playing in a total of 19 games in which he averaged 13.2 minutes and 4.4 points per game as he shot 41% from three-point range.

== See also ==
- List of select Jewish basketball players
