= Joaquin Szuchman =

Israeli-Argentine basketball player

Joaquin Szuchman חואקין שוכמן
No. 5 – Maccabi Ramat Gan
- Position: Shooting guard
- League: Israeli Basketball Premier League

Personal information
- Born: January 29, 1995 (age 31) Concordia, Argentina
- Listed height: 1.91 m (6 ft 3 in)
- Listed weight: 86 kg (190 lb)

Career information
- NBA draft: 2017: undrafted
- Playing career: 2012–present

Career history
- 2012–2019: Hapoel Gilboa Galil
- 2014–2015: →Hapoel Afula
- 2019–2021: Hapoel Tel Aviv
- 2021–2022: Hapoel Eilat
- 2022–2025: Hapoel Be'er Sheva
- 2025–2026: Maccabi Ra'anana
- 2026–present: Maccabi Ramat Gan

Career highlights
- Israeli Premier League Defensive Player of the Year (2018); All-Israeli Premier League Second Team (2018); 2× Israeli Premier League All-Star (2018–2019); Israeli National League champion (2016)

Joaquin Szuchman (Hebrew: חואקין שוכמן; born January 29, 1995) is an Israeli-Argentine professional basketball player for Maccabi Ramat Gan of the Israeli Basketball Premier League. Szuchman, a 1.91 metres (6 feet 3 inches) tall shooting guard, is primarily known for his defensive skills. He was the 2018 Israeli Basketball Premier League Defensive Player of the Year.

== Early life ==
Szuchman is Jewish, and was born in Concordia, Argentina. Szuchman lived his first 7 years in Argentina before growing up in Nahariya and later in Moshav Barak, Israel. He played for Hapoel Gilboa Galil youth team and Emek Charod high-school team.

== Professional career ==
In 2012, Szuchman started his professional career with Hapoel Gilboa Galil. On April 11, 2013, Szuchman made his professional debut in a match against Elitzur Ashkelon.

On August 27, 2015, Szuchman was named Gilboa Galil's team captain. Szuchman, alongside his teammates Demetrius Treadwell and Jason Siggers, helped Gilboa Galil to promote to the Israeli Premier League after they defeated Ironi Kiryat Ata in the National League Finals in five games.

On July 12, 2017, Szuchman signed a three-year contract extension with Gilboa Galil. On December 28, 2017, Szuchman was named Israeli Player of the Month for games played in December. On April 1, 2018, Szuchman recorded 17 points along with 5 assists and 5 steals in a 90–76 win over Maccabi Rishon LeZion. He was subsequently named Israeli League Round 22 MVP. On May 10, 2018, Szuchman recorded a career-high 22 points, shooting 9-of-16 from the field, along with 7 assists, 3 rebounds and 3 steals in a 78–86 loss to Bnei Herzliya.

Szuchman helped Gilboa Galil reach the 2018 Israeli League Playoffs, where they eventually lost to Hapoel Jerusalem. In June 2018, Szuchman was named the Israeli League Best Defender, and earned a spot in the All-Israeli League Second Team.

On June 25, 2019, Szuchman signed a two-year deal with Hapoel Tel Aviv, joining his former head coach Ariel Beit-Halahmy.

In summer 2022, he signed with Hapoel Be'er Sheva of the Israeli Basketball Premier League.

== Israeli national team ==
Szuchman is a member of the Israeli national basketball team. On November 24, 2017, He made his first appearance for the senior team at the 2019 FIBA Basketball World Cup qualification match against Estonia.

Szuchman was also a member of the Israeli U-18 and U-20 national teams, he also participated at the 2017 Summer Universiade.
