= Ariel Beit-Halahmy =

Israeli basketball coach (born 1966)

Ariel Beit-Halahmy אריאל בית הלחמי
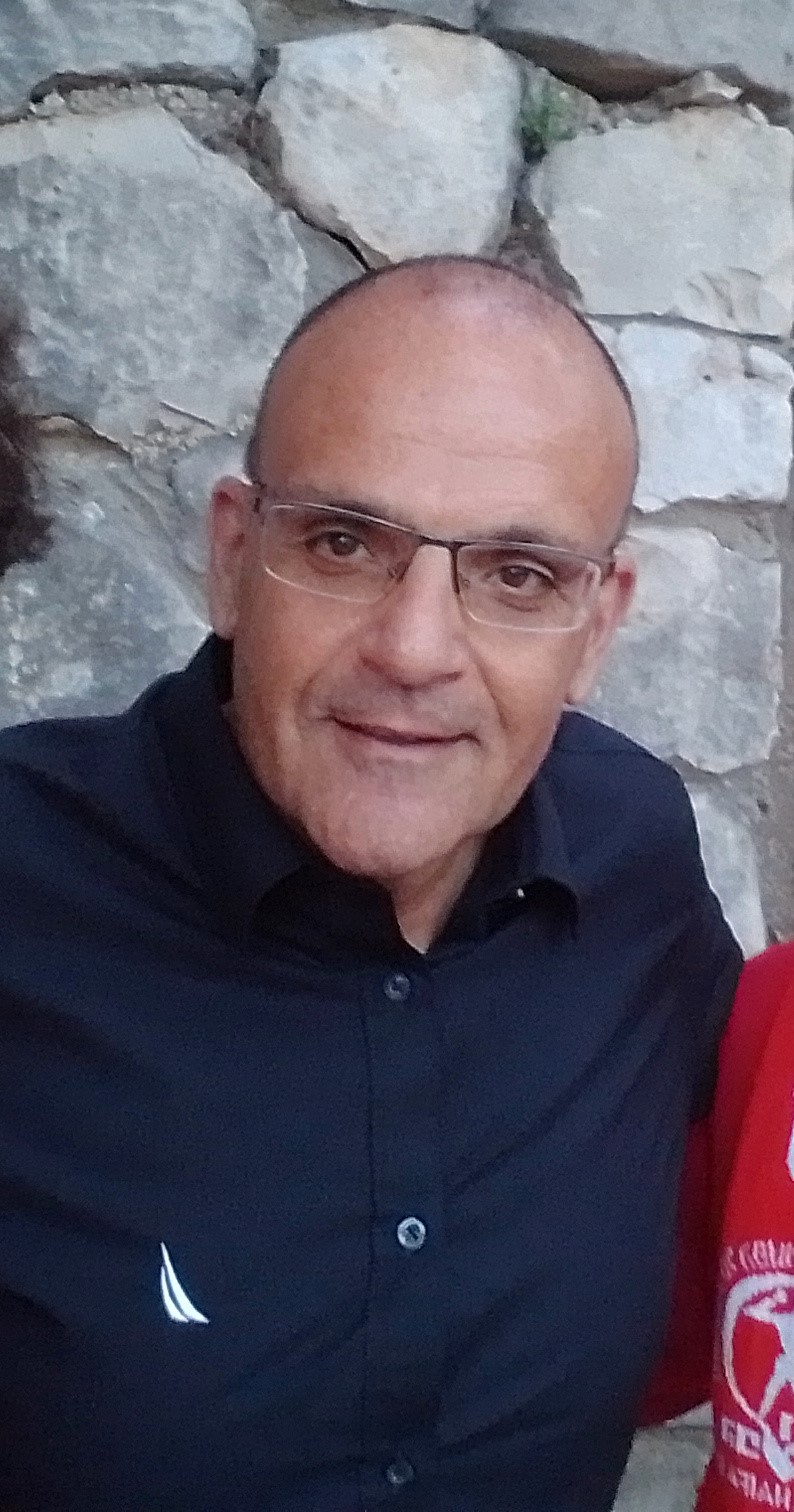

Hapoel Gilboa Galil
- Position: Head coach
- League: Israeli Basketball Premier League

Personal information
- Born: 4 February 1966 (age 60)
- Coaching career: 1999–present

Career history

Coaching
- 1999–2003: Elitzur Givat Shmuel
- 2003–2006: Elitzur Ashkelon
- 2005–2007: Israel (assistant)
- 2006–2008: Ironi Nahariya
- 2008–2009: Bnei Hasharon
- 2008–2009: Israel U-20
- 2009–2011: Elitzur Ashkelon
- 2012–2013: Bnei Hasharon
- 2013: Elitzur Ashkelon
- 2015–2019: Hapoel Gilboa Galil
- 2017–2019: Israel U-20
- 2019–2020: Hapoel Tel Aviv
- 2020–2022: Hapoel Eilat
- 2023: Hapoel Gilboa Galil
- 2023–present: Israel
- 2024–present: Hapoel Afula
Medals
Men's basketball
Head Coach for Israel
FIBA U20 European Championship
Gold medal – first place	2018 Germany	U20 Team
Gold medal – first place	2019 Israel	U20 Team

Ariel Avraham Beit-Halahmy (Hebrew: אריאל בית הלחמי; born 4 February 1966) is an Israeli professional basketball coach who is the current head coach for Hapoel Afula of the Israeli Premier League and the Israel national team.

== Early life ==
Beit-Halahmy grew up in Givat Shmuel and played for the Elitzur Givat Shmuel basketball youth team.

== Coaching career ==
=== Early years (1999–2015) ===
In 1999, Beit-Halahmy started his coaching career with Elitzur Givat Shmuel. In his fourth season with Givat Shmuel, Beit-Halahmy led the team to the Israeli League semi-finals, and reached the Israeli State Cup Final, where they eventually lost to Maccabi Tel Aviv.

In 2003, Beit-Halahmy was named Elitzur Ashkelon head coach. In his second season with Asheklon, he led the team to Israeli League playoffs as the third seed, but they eventually were eliminated by Maccabi Tel Aviv in the semi-finals.

On 12 July 2006, Beit-Halahmy was named Ironi Nahariya's new head coach, signing a two-year deal.

On 5 November 2008, Beit-Halahmy was named Bnei Hasharon head coach for the 2008–09 season. That season, he led the team to the Israeli League quarter-finals, where they eventually lost Maccabi Haifa.

On 28 March 2013, Beit-Halahmy returned to Elitzur Ashkelon for a third stint, signing a two-year deal.

=== Hapoel Gilboa Galil (2015–2019) ===
On 11 March 2015, Beit-Halahmy was named the Hapoel Gilboa Galil head coach for the rest of the season. In his second season with Gilboa Galil, Beit-Halahmy helped the team promote back to the Israeli Premier League after they defeated Ironi Kiryat Ata in the National League Finals in five games.

In his fourth season with Gilboa Galil, Beit-Halahmy was named two-time Israeli League Coach of the Month for games played in December and April. He led Gilboa Galil to the Israeli League Playoffs as the sixth seed, where they eventually were eliminated by Hapoel Jerusalem in the quarter-finals.

=== Hapoel Tel Aviv (2019–2020) ===
On 16 June 2019, Beit-Halahmy was named the Hapoel Tel Aviv new head coach, signing a two-year deal. On 18 January 2020, Beit-Halahmy parted ways with Hapoel after a 6–10 start to the 2019–20 season.

=== Hapoel Eilat (2020–2022) ===
On 20 July 2020, he signed with Hapoel Eilat of the Israeli Basketball Premier League.

=== Hapoel Gilboa Galil (2023–present) ===
On 9 January 2023, he signed with Hapoel Gilboa Galil of the Israeli Premier League.

== National team coaching career ==
In July 2018, Beit-Halahmy led the Israel national U-20 team to their first-ever FIBA U20 European Championship title. A year later, he led the team to their second U20 European Championship title in Israel.

On 17 March 2023, Beit-Halahmy was appointed as head coach of the senior Israel national team, replacing Guy Goodes.
