= Raviv Limonad =

Israeli basketball player (born 1984)

Raviv Limonad רביב לימונד
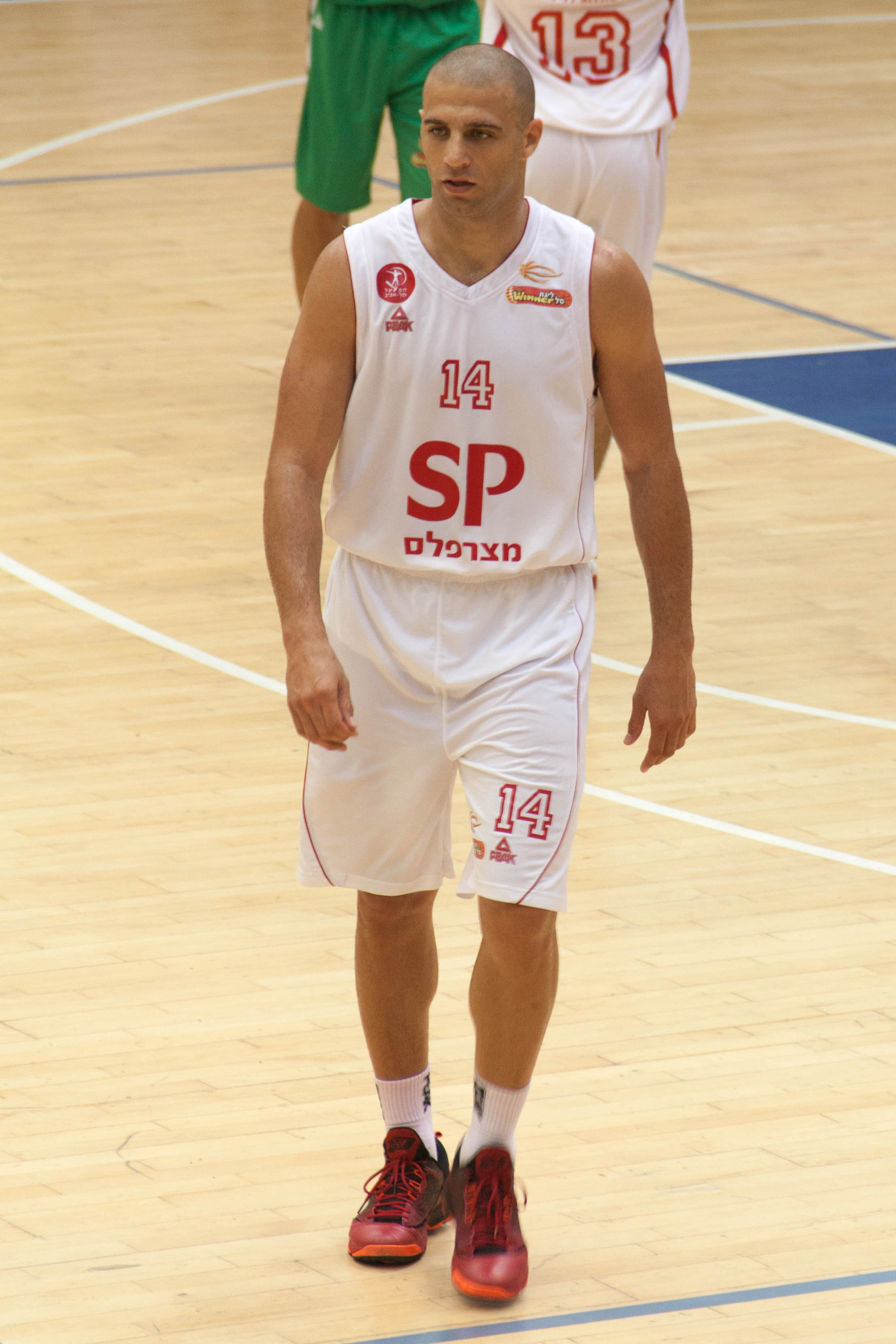
- Limonad playing for Hapoel Tel Aviv in 2014

Free agent
- Position: Point guard / shooting guard

Personal information
- Born: August 26, 1984 (age 42) Netanya, Israel
- Listed height: 1.91 m (6 ft 3 in)
- Listed weight: 195 lb (88 kg)

Career information
- Playing career: 2003–present

Career history
- 2003–2004: Ironi Ramat Gan
- 2004–2006: Hapoel Jerusalem
- 2006–2007: Ironi Nahariya
- 2007–2008: Le Mans Sarthe
- 2008–2009: Ironi Nahariya
- 2009–2010: Maccabi Tel Aviv
- 2010–2011: Menorca
- 2011–2012: Ironi Ashkelon
- 2012: Hapoel Jerusalem
- 2013–2019: Hapoel Tel Aviv
- 2019–2021: Ironi Nes Ziona

Career highlights
- FIBA Europe Cup champion (2021); EuroCup champion (2004); Israeli League Rising Star (2003); 2× All-Israeli League First Team (2007, 2014)

Raviv Limonad (Hebrew: רביב לימונד; born 26 August 1984) is an Israeli professional basketball player who last played for Ironi Nes Ziona of the Israeli Premier League. He is a 191 cm (6 ft 3 in) tall combo guard.

== High school career ==
Limonad started playing basketball at Elitzur Natanya and high-school "Ort Yad Leybovich", with whom he won the Israeli high school championship in 2001.

== Professional career ==
In 2003, Limonad started his professional career with Ironi Ramat Gan of the Israeli Super League. In the midst of the 2003–04 season, he moved to the Israeli club Hapoel Jerusalem, winning with them the 2003–04 ULEB Cup (now called EuroCup) championship, after a win over Real Madrid.

In 2009, he won the Israeli Super League championship with Maccabi Tel Aviv.

On July 11, 2019, Limonad signed with Ironi Nes Ziona for the 2019–20 season.

== Israeli national team ==
In 2004, Limonad shined at the 2004 FIBA Europe Under-20 Championship, together with the likes of Yotam Halperin and Lior Eliyahu, as they won the tournament's silver medal, after a final-minute loss finals to Slovenia.

Raviv has also been a member of the senior Israeli national team.
