= Tyler Stone (basketball) =

American basketball player (born 1991)

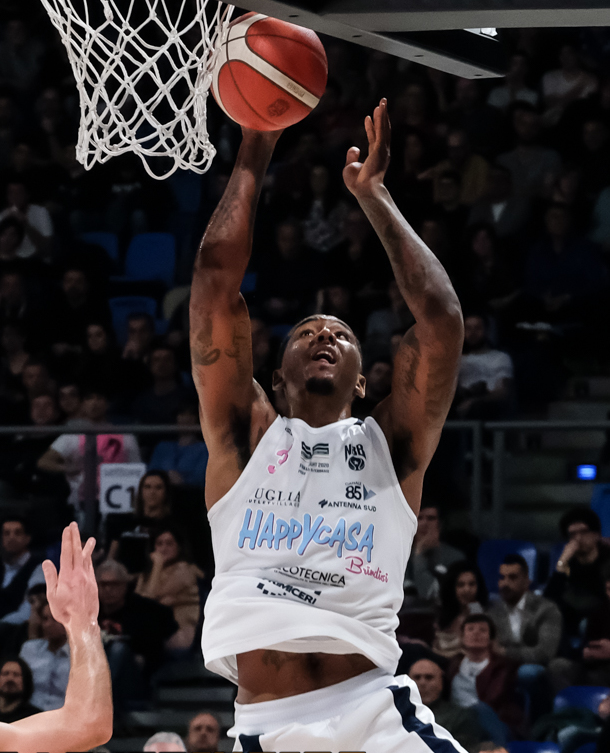

Free Agent
- Position: Power forward

Personal information
- Born: September 8, 1991 (age 35) Memphis, Tennessee, U.S.
- Listed height: 6 ft 8 in (2.03 m)
- Listed weight: 230 lb (104 kg)

Career information
- High school: Central (Memphis, Tennessee)
- College: Missouri (2009–2010); Southeast Missouri State (2011–2014)
- NBA draft: 2014: undrafted
- Playing career: 2014–present

Career history
- 2014–2015: Denizli Basket
- 2015–2016: Rethymno Cretan Kings
- 2016–2017: Chiba Jets
- 2017: Hapoel Gilboa Galil
- 2017–2018: Shimane Susanoo Magic
- 2018: Enisey
- 2019: Pallacanestro Cantù
- 2019: Piratas de Quebradillas
- 2019–2020: New Basket Brindisi
- 2020–2021: Nanterre 92
- 2021–2022: BCM Gravelines-Dunkerque
- 2022–2023: Rapid București
- 2023: Hefei Storm
- 2023–2024: Bnei Herzliya
- 2024–2025: Benfica

Career highlights
- Portuguese League champion (2025); First-team All-OVC (2014); 2× Second-team All-OVC (2012, 2013); OVC All-Newcomer Team (2012)

Tyler Stone (born September 8, 1991) is an American professional basketball player who last played for S.L. Benfica of the Liga Portuguesa de Basquetebol and the Basketball Champions League. He played college basketball for the University of Missouri and Southeast Missouri State University, before playing professionally in Turkey, Greece, Japan, Israel, Russia, and Italy.

== High school career ==
Stone attended Central High School in Memphis, Tennessee. As a senior, he averaged 15 points and eight rebounds, leading the Warriors to a 25–4 record, and earning All-Area, All-Region and District 16 AAA Most Valuable Player honors. He also earned All-Metro honors as a junior and a senior.

== College career ==
In his freshman season at Missouri, Stone played sparingly for the Tigers. In 12 games, he averaged just 1.8 points per game.

In April 2010, he transferred to Southeast Missouri State and subsequently sat out the 2010–11 season due to NCAA transfer rules.

In his sophomore season, he was named to the All-OVC second team, OVC All-Newcomer team, and NABC All-District first team. In 31 games (29 starts), he averaged 14.7 points (9th in the Ohio Valley Conference), 7.3 rebounds (3rd), and 1.1 blocks (5th) in 29.6 minutes per game, with a .530 field goal percentage (2nd).

In his junior season, he was named to the All-OVC second team for the second straight year. In 33 games (29 starts), he averaged 15.5 points (8th in the Conference), 7.8 rebounds (5th), 1.2 assists and 1.3 blocks (5th) in 32.2 minutes per game, with a .492 field goal percentage (3rd), while leading the conference with 194 2-point field goals.

In his senior season, he was named to the All-OVC first team, and became the 23rd player at Southeast to score over 1,000 points in his career when he finished with 24 at Ball State on November 18, 2013. In 30 games (26 starts), he averaged 19.3 points (2nd in the Conference), 9.5 rebounds (4th), 1.9 assists, 1.0 steals and 1.5 blocks (4th) in 33.5 minutes per game, with a .544 field goal percentage (3rd), while leading the conference with 200 2-point field goals.

== Professional career ==
=== 2014–15 season ===
After going undrafted in the 2014 NBA draft, Stone joined the Indiana Pacers for the 2014 NBA Summer League, playing four games with them. On July 9, 2014, he signed with Beşiktaş for the 2014–15 Turkish Basketball League season. However, on October 11, he was loaned to Denizli Basket (2006) of the Turkish Second League before appearing in a game for them. In 28 games for Denizli, he averaged 14.5 points, 7.6 rebounds, 1.3 assists and 1.3 steals per game.

=== 2015–16 season ===
In July 2015, Stone joined the Minnesota Timberwolves for the 2015 NBA Summer League, playing three games with them.

On October 29, 2015, he signed with Rethymno Cretan Kings of the Greek Basketball League, with whom he averaged 12.8 points, 6.2 rebounds (10th in the league), and 0.7 blocks (10th) per game.

=== 2016–17 season ===
On August 5, 2016, Stone signed a one-year deal with the Japanese team Chiba Jets. In 57 games played during the 2016–17 season, he averaged 17.9 points (6th in the Japanese B.league)), 7.1 rebounds, and 2.2 assists per game.

=== 2017–18 season ===
On August 16, 2017, Stone signed with the Israeli team Hapoel Gilboa Galil for the 2017–18 season. On November 6, 2017, Stone recorded a career-high 36 points, shooting 14-of-21 from the field, along with eleven rebounds in a 92–73 win over Ironi Nahariya. He was subsequently named Israeli Premier League Round 5 MVP. In 7 games played for Gilboa Galil, he averaged 20.2 points (leading the Israeli Premier League), 9.4 rebounds (2nd), 1.9 steals (8th), and 3.4 assists per game.

On November 21, 2017, his contract was bought out by the Shimane Susanoo Magic of the top-tier Japanese B.League.

=== 2018–19 season ===
On July 24, 2018, Stone joined the Russian team Enisey of the VTB United League. On February 27, 2019, Stone signed with the Italian team Pallacanestro Cantù for the rest of the season.

=== 2019–20 season ===
On July 31, 2019, he signed with New Basket Brindisi of the Italian Lega Basket Serie A (LBA). He averaged 14.8 points and 7.2 rebounds (9th in the league) per game.

=== 2020–21 season ===
On July 12, 2020, Stone signed with Nanterre 92 of the French LNB Pro A. He averaged 10 points and 4.8 rebounds per game.

=== 2020–21 season ===
On August 13, 2021, Stone signed with JL Bourg. He parted ways with the team on September 27.

=== 2021–22 season ===
On September 27, 2021, Stone signed with BCM Gravelines-Dunkerque of the LNB Pro A.

=== 2022–23 season ===
On August 6, 2022, he signed with Rapid București of the Liga Națională. He averaged 19.5 points (2nd in the league) and 6.6 rebounds per game. In the 2022-23 season, Stone was named Eurobasket.com's All-Romanian League Player of the Year, Import Player of the Year, and Forward of the Year.

=== 2023–24 season ===
On September 22, 2023, Stone signed with the San Miguel Beermen of the Philippine Basketball Association (PBA) as the team's import for the 2023–24 PBA Commissioner's Cup. However, he never played for the team as he returned to the U.S. to attend to his wife who just gave birth.

On December 26, 2023, Stone signed with and is playing for Bnei Herzliya of the Israeli Basketball Premier League for the 2023-2024 season.

== Personal ==
Stone is the son of James Bradley and Sharon Stone. His father played collegiately at the University of Memphis and was drafted 35th overall by the Atlanta Hawks in 1979. His cousin, Jarekious Bradley, joined him at Southeast Missouri State in 2013.Spouse: Brittney Stone Children: Bailey Stone, Tyler Stone Jr., Tylan Stone
