= Oz Blayzer =

Israeli basketball player (born 1992)

Oz Blayzer עוז בלייזר
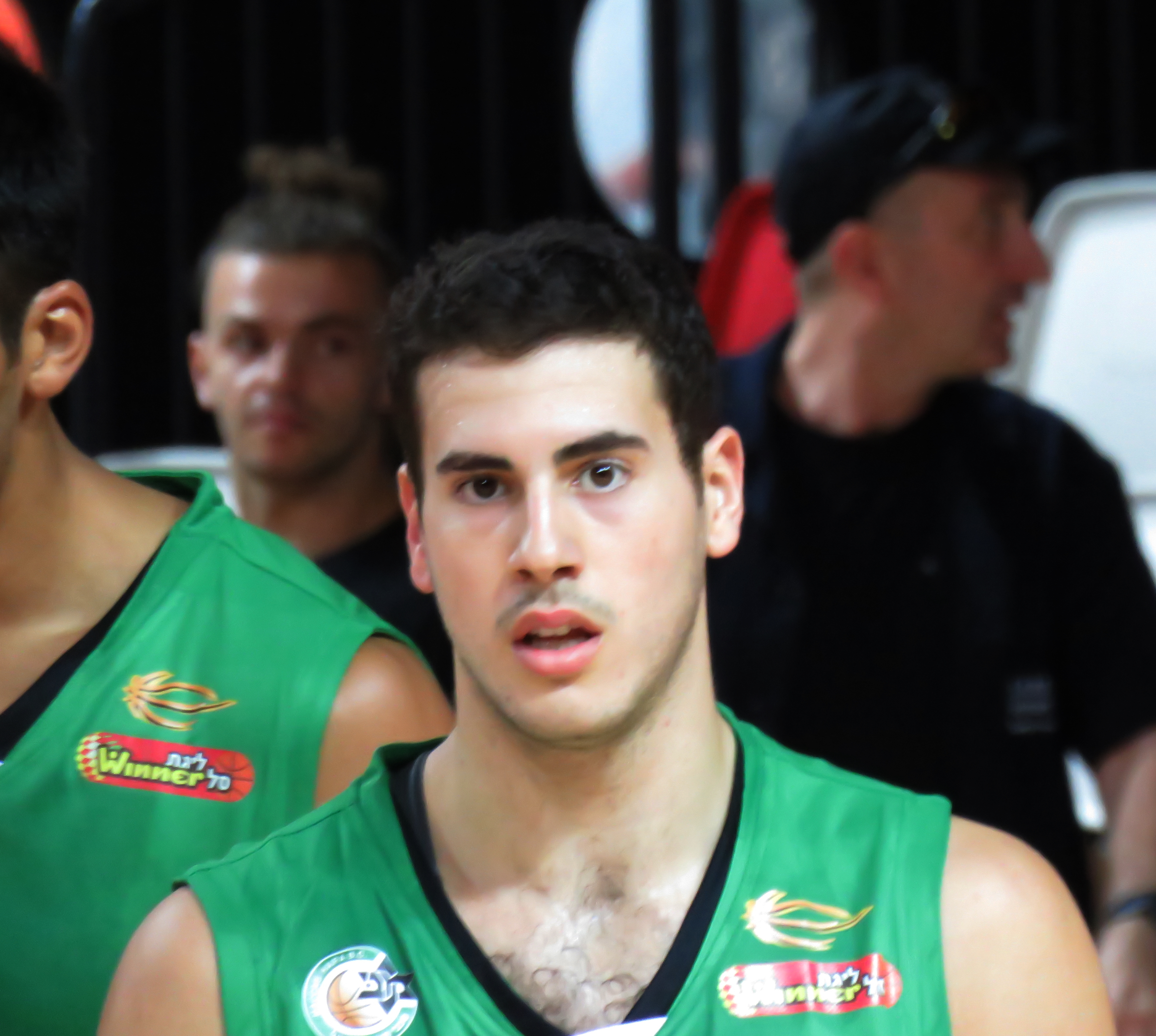
- Blayzer with Maccabi Haifa in 2015

No. 14 – Hapoel Tel Aviv
- Position: Small forward / power forward
- League: Israeli Basketball Premier League; EuroLeague

Personal information
- Born: December 29, 1992 (age 33) Kfar Tavor, Israel
- Listed height: 2.01 m (6 ft 7 in)
- Listed weight: 101 kg (223 lb)

Career information
- NBA draft: 2014: undrafted
- Playing career: 2011–present

Career history
- 2011–2013: Hapoel Afula
- 2013–2015: Bnei Herzliya
- 2015–2018: Maccabi Haifa
- 2018–2020: Maccabi Rishon LeZion
- 2020–2022: Maccabi Tel Aviv
- 2022–2024: Hapoel Jerusalem
- 2024–present: Hapoel Tel Aviv

Career highlights
- EuroCup champion (2025); Israeli Basketball Premier League champion (2021); Israeli State Cup winner (2021, 2023, 2024); 3× Israeli League Cup winner (2018, 2021, 2022); 4× Israeli Basketball Premier League All-Star (2014, 2016–2018); Israeli Basketball Premier League Rising Star (2014)

Oz Blayzer (Hebrew: עוז בלייזר; born December 29, 1992) is an Israeli professional basketball player for Hapoel Tel Aviv of the Israeli Israeli Basketball Premier League and the EuroLeague. He has also played for the Israel national basketball team.

== Biography ==
Oz Blayzer was born in Kfar Tavor, Israel. He played with the Hapoel Gilboa-Afula youth team.

== Professional career ==
=== Hapoel Afula ===
On August 16, 2011, Blayzer started his professional career with Hapoel Afula of the Liga Leumit.

=== Bnei Herzliya ===
On July 3, 2013, Blayzer signed a two-year deal with Bnei Herzliya. In 2013-14, he played 29 games in which he averaged 20.3 minutes, 7.4 points, and 3.9 rebounds per game; In his first season with Herzliya, Blayzer was named co-Israeli Basketball Premier League Rising Star, alongside his teammate Aviram Zelkovits.

In 2014-15, he played 33 games in which he averaged 24.4 minutes, 9.0 points, 4.3 rebounds, 1.1 assists, and 1.1 steals per game, as he shot 45.2% from the floor.

=== Maccabi Haifa ===
On June 20, 2015, Blayzer signed a two-year contract with Maccabi Haifa. In 2015-16 with Maccabi Haifa, he played 37 games in which he averaged 25.4 minutes, 8.4 points, 4.7 rebounds, 1.3 assists, and 1.3 steals per game, as he shot 80.7% from the free throw line.

On May 9, 2016, Blayzer signed a two-year contract extension with Haifa. That season, Blayzer helped Haifa to reach the 2017 Israeli League Finals where they eventually lost to Hapoel Jerusalem. In 2016-17 with Maccabi Haifa, he played 38 games in which he averaged 29.4 minutes, 11.4 points, 6.1 rebounds (7th in the league), 2.0 assists, and 1.4 steals per game, as he shot 81.6% from the free throw line.

On March 26, 2018, Blayzer recorded a season-high 25 points without missing a single shot (shooting 6-of-6 from the field and 9-of-9 from the free throw line), along with 3 rebounds and 2 assists in a 98–95 win over Hapoel Gilboa Galil. He was subsequently named Israeli League Round 21 MVP. In 2017-18 with Maccabi Haifa, he played 32 games in which he averaged 28.3 minutes, 10.8 points, 5.6 rebounds, 1.4 assists, and 1.7 steals (9th in the league) per game.

=== Maccabi Rishon LeZion ===
On July 18, 2018, Blayzer signed a two-year deal with Maccabi Rishon LeZion. In 2018-19 with Maccabi Rishon LeZion, he played 39 games in which he averaged 21.8 minutes, 7.5 points, 4.3 rebounds, 1.2 assists, and 1.2 steals per game.

In 2019-20 with Maccabi Rishon LeZion, he played 42 games in which he averaged 25.5 minutes, 8.8 points, 5.1 rebounds, 1.0 assists, and 1.0 steals per game.

=== Maccabi Tel Aviv ===
On August 11, 2020, Blayzer signed with Maccabi Tel Aviv of the Israeli Basketball Premier League. In 2020-21with MaccabiTel Aviv, he played 68 games in which he averaged 15.9 minutes, 4.9 points, and 2.6 rebounds per game.

In 2021-22 with Maccabi Tel Aviv, he played 47 games in which he averaged 13.8 minutes, 4.0 points, and 2.9 rebounds per game, while shooting 84.1% from the free throw line.

=== Hapoel Jerusalem ===
On June 26, 2022, he signed with Hapoel Jerusalem of the Israeli Basketball Premier League. In 2022-23 with Hapoel Jerusalem, he played 37 games in which he averaged 17.8 minutes, 5.4 points, and 3.6 rebounds per game, while shooting 80.6% from the free throw line.

In 2023-24 with Hapoel Jerusalem, he played 40 games in which he averaged 15.4 minutes, 4.4 points, and 2.9 rebounds per game.

=== Hapoel Tel Aviv ===
On June 22, 2024, he signed with Hapoel Tel Aviv of the Israeli Basketball Premier League. In 2024-25 with Hapoel Tel Aviv, he played 49 games in which he averaged 12.6 minutes, 4.2 points, and 2.3 rebounds per game, while shooting 46.3% from the floor and 85.7% from the free throw line.

In 2025-26 with Hapoel Tel Aviv, he played 32 games in which he averaged 14.4 minutes, 5.3 points, and 2.5 rebounds per game, while shooting 47.2% from the floor and 84.6% from the free throw line.

== International career ==
Blayzer played for the Israeli National Team at the 2017 Eurobasket tournament, as well as in 2021, and 2023-25. Blayzer was also a member of the Israeli Under-18 and Under-20 national teams.
