= Avi Ben-Chimol =

Israeli basketball player (born 1985)

Avi Ben-Chimol אבי בן-שימול
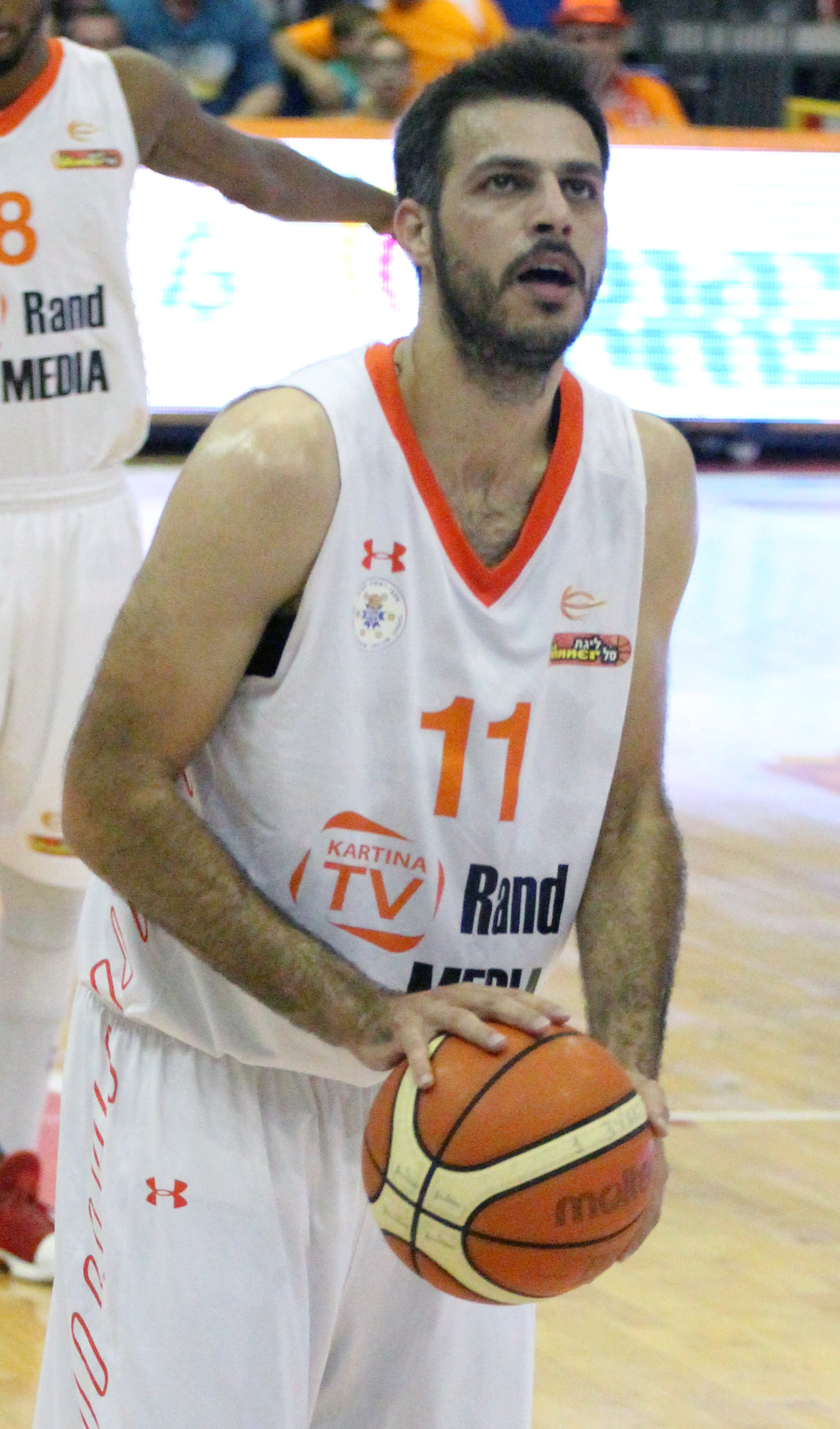
- Ben-Chimol playing for Rishon LeZion in 2017

No. 11 – Maccabi Haifa
- Position: Point guard
- League: Israeli Premier League

Personal information
- Born: May 22, 1985 (age 41) Kfar Saba, Israel
- Listed height: 1.94 m (6 ft 4 in)

Career information
- NBA draft: 2007: undrafted
- Playing career: 2003–present

Career history
- 2003–2004: Maccabi Tel Aviv
- 2004–2005: Hapoel Galil Elyon
- 2005–2006: Ironi Ramat Gan
- 2006–2008: Hapoel Galil Elyon
- 2008–2009: Ironi Ashkelon
- 2009–2010: Maccabi Rishon LeZion
- 2010–2012: Maccabi Haifa
- 2012–2013: Hapoel Eilat
- 2013–2014: Bnei Herzliya
- 2014–2015: Maccabi Ashdod
- 2015–2018: Maccabi Rishon LeZion
- 2018–2020: Hapoel Eilat
- 2020–present: Maccabi Haifa

Career highlights
- EuroLeague champion (2004); 2× Israeli Premier League champion (2004, 2016); 2× Israeli Premier League Assists Leader (2018, 2019); Israeli Premier League All-Star (2018); Israeli Cup winner (2004)

Avraham "Avi" Ben-Chimol (Hebrew: אבי בן-שימול; born May 22, 1985) is an Israeli professional basketball player for Maccabi Haifa of the Israeli Premier League. He was the Israeli Premier League Assists Leader in 2018 and 2019.

== Early years ==
Ben-Chimol was born in Kfar Saba, Israel, he played for Maccabi Tel Aviv youth team, he also played for Ironi Tet high-school team and led them to win the state championship in 2003.

== Professional career ==
Ben-Chimol started his professional career with Maccabi Tel Aviv. In his first season with Maccabi, he won the Israeli League, Israeli Cup and Euroleague titles. On May 1, 2004, Ben-Chimol recorded 2 points and 1 assist in the EuroLeague Final match against Skipper Bologna.

On August 6, 2009, Ben-Chimol signed with Maccabi Rishon LeZion for the 2009–10 season.

On June 17, 2010, Ben-Chimol signed a two-year deal with Maccabi Haifa.

On July 31, 2013, Ben-Chimol signed a two-year deal with Bnei Herzliya.

On October 14, 2014, Ben-Chimol signed with Maccabi Ashdod for the 2014–15 season.

On July 24, 2015, Ben-Chimol returned to Maccabi Rishon LeZion for a second stint, signing a two-year deal. That season, he helped Rishon LeZion to win the 2016 Israeli League Championship.

On October 23, 2016, Ben-Chimol signed a one-year contract extension with Maccabi Rishon LeZion. In his fourth season with Rishon LeZion, Ben-Chimol participated in the Israeli League All-Star Game. He finished the season as the Israeli League Assists Leader by averaging 7.2 per game.

On July 9, 2018, Ben-Chimol returned to Hapoel Eilat for a second stint, signing a two-year deal. He was again the Israeli Premier League Assists Leader in 2019. He averaged 7.2 points and 5.7 assists per game during the 2019–20 season.

On August 19, 2020, Ben-Chimol signed one-year deal with Maccabi Haifa.

== Israel national team ==
Ben-Chimol is a member of the Israel national basketball team. On November 24, 2017, He made his first appearance for the senior team at the 2019 FIBA Basketball World Cup qualification in a match against Estonia.

Ben-Chimol was a member of the Israeli National Under-20 team. he helped the team to reach the 2004 FIBA Europe Under-20 Finals, where they eventually lost to Slovenia.
