= 2025–26 Israeli Basketball Premier League =

Israeli Basketball Premier League
- Season: 2025–26
- Dates: October 2025 – June 2026
- Teams: 14
- TV partner: Sports Channel

Regular season
- Season MVP: (United States) Jared Harper
- Relegated: Elitzur Netanya; Maccabi Ironi Ra'anana

Finals
- Champions: Maccabi Tel Aviv
- Runners-up: Hapoel Tel Aviv
- Semi-finalists: Hapoel Jerusalem; Hapoel Holon
- Finals MVP: (Denmark) Gabriel Lundberg

Awards
- Israeli MVP: (Israel) Roman Sorkin
- Rising Star: (Israel) Yuval Hochstadter
- Best Defender: (United States) Daeshon Francis
- Most Improved: (Israel) Yoav Vitlem
- Sixth Man: (United States) Justin Smith
- Coach of the Year: (Israel) Oded Kattash

The 2025–26 Israeli Basketball Premier League, for sponsorship reasons Ligat Winner, will be the 72nd season of the Israeli Basketball Premier League. The season will start in October 2025.

== Format ==
The regular season played in a 26-round (13 round-robin format). The top 6 finishers Advance to the playoffs, will the 7th to 10th-ranked teams face each other in the play-in showdown. Each game is hosted by the team with the higher regular season record. The format is similar to the first two rounds of the Page–McIntyre system for a four-team playoff, and is identical to that of the NBA play-in tournament. First, the 7th seed hosts the 8th seed, with the winner advancing to the playoffs; likewise the 9th seed hosts the 10th seed, with the loser eliminated. Then the loser of the 7-v-8 game hosts the winner of the 9-v-10 game, with the winner of that game getting the final playoff spot. the 11th to 14th-ranked teams played in a 4-round (2 round-robin format), the bottom two teams relegated to Liga Leumit

=== Format Changes ===
Following the war in Iran, the regular season games were suspended at the beginning of March. When play resumed in April, several format changes were implemented. As long as the war continued, games were held in neutral venues equipped with standard protected spaces: Enerbox Arena in Hadera as the main venue, and Netanya Arena as the secondary venue. The play-in stage was canceled, and the 7th and 8th-ranked teams advanced to the playoffs. The Playoffs quarterfinals were shortened to a best-of-three series, while the semifinals and finals remained best-of-five series. The Playout stage remained unchanged.

== Teams ==
Teams of the 2025–26 Israeli Basketball Premier League

Elitzur Netanya and Hapoel Haifa have been relegated to 2025–26 National League after placing in the bottom place of the 2024–25 Premier League. However, in light of Hapoel Afula's dissolution due to financial difficulties, Elitzur Netanya, which was ranked highest among the relegated teams, is entitled to replace it in the league. Ironi Ra'anana and Rishon LeZion have been promoted to the league after win for the 2024–25 National League.

=== Stadia and locations ===
Team	Home city	Stadium	Capacity
Bnei Herzliya	Herzliya	HaYovel Herzliya	1,500
Elitzur Netanya	Netanya	Netanya Arena	2,500
Hapoel Be'er Sheva/Dimona	Be'er Sheva and Dimona	Conch Arena	3,000
Hapoel Galil Elyon	Upper Galilee	HaPais Kfar Blum	2,000
Hapoel HaEmek	Gilboa Regional, Lower Galilee and Afula	Gan Ner Sports Hall	2,057
Hapoel Holon	Holon	Holon Toto Hall	5,500
Hapoel Jerusalem	Jerusalem	Pais Arena	11,000
Hapoel Tel Aviv	Tel Aviv	Menora Mivtachim Arena	10,383
Ironi Kiryat Ata	Kiryat Ata	Ramaz Hall	1,200
Ironi Ness Ziona	Ness Ziona	Lev Hamoshava	1,300
Ironi Ra'anana	Ra'anana	Metro West	1,668
Maccabi Ironi Ramat Gan	Ramat Gan	Zisman Hall	1,500
Maccabi Rishon LeZion	Rishon LeZion	Beit Maccabi Rishon	2,500
Maccabi Tel Aviv	Tel Aviv	Menora Mivtachim Arena	10,383

=== Personnel and sponsorship ===
Team	Chairman	Head coach	Team captain	Kit manufacturer	Main sponsor
Bnei Herzliya	(Israel) Eldad Akunis	(Israel) Yehu Orland	(Israel) Shalev Lugashi	Peak	PenLink
Elitzur Netanya		(Israel) Eli Rabi	(Israel) Boris Boguslavsky	Peak	BRIGA
Hapoel Be'er Sheva/Dimona	(Israel) Kfir Arazi	(Israel) Yaniv Ravins	(Israel) Neta Segal	Kempa	Altshuler Shacham
Hapoel Galil Elyon	(Israel) Tamir Abrahams	(Israel) Idan Avshalom	(Israel) Yahel Melamed	Peak	Rivulis
Hapoel HaEmek	(Israel) Gideon Yadin	(Israel) Sharon Avrahami	(Israel) Roey Netzia	ON	Gilat Telecom
Hapoel Holon	(Israel) Eitan Lanciano	(Bosnia and Herzegovina) Predrag Krunić	(Israel) Netanel Artzi	Kelme	Netanel Groups
Hapoel Jerusalem	(Israel) (United States) Matan Edelson	(Israel) Yonatan Alon	(Israel) Yovel Zoosman	Nike	Midtown Jerusalem
Hapoel Tel Aviv	(Israel) Offer Yanai	(Greece) Dimitrios Itoudis	(Israel) Bar Timor	Self Made	IBI Investment
Ironi Kiryat Ata	(Israel) Naftali Bentov	(Israel) Eldad Bentov	(Israel) Gal Baitner	Reebok	Lati Construction
Ironi Ness Ziona	(Israel) Yaniv Mizrahi	(United States) Paul Corsaro	(United States) (Israel) Spencer Weisz	Peak	Chai Motors
Ironi Ra'anana	(Israel) Dror Garibinski	(Israel) Guni Israeli	(Israel) (Argentina) Joaquin Szuchman	Peak	AB-GAD
Maccabi Ironi Ramat Gan	(Israel) Chen Shnaiderman	(Israel) Shmulik Brenner	(Israel) Adam Ariel	Peak	Cnanan Groups
Maccabi Rishon LeZion	(Israel) Erez Ben Haim	(Israel) Guy Kaplan	(United States) (Israel) Ben Eisenhardt	Peak	Tapuzina
Maccabi Tel Aviv	(Israel) Shimon Mizrahi	(Israel) Oded Kattash	(United States) (Israel) John DiBartolomeo	Adidas	Rapyd

=== Managerial changes ===
Team	Outgoing manager	Manner of departure	Date of vacancy	Position in table	Replaced with	Date of appointment	Ref.
Elitzur Netanya	(Israel) Idan Avshalom	Mutual Consent	6 November 2025	13th (1–3)	(Greece) Aris Lykogiannis	6 November 2025	
Maccabi Rishon LeZion	(Israel) Sharon Drucker	Mutual Consent	8 December 2025	12th (1–7)	(Israel) Guy Kaplan	8 December 2025	
Elitzur Netanya	(Greece) Aris Lykogiannis	Mutual Consent	21 December 2025	14th (1–9)	(Israel) Eli Rabi	27 December 2025	
Ironi Ness Ziona	(Israel) Amit Schaerf	Fired	28 December 2025	11th (3–8)	(Israel) Meir Tapiro	28 December 2025	
Hapoel Holon	(Israel) Danny Franco	Mutual Consent	29 December 2025	5th (7–4)	(Israel) Yoav Shamir	30 December 2025	
Hapoel Galil Elyon	(Israel) Guni Israeli	Fired	30 December 2025	13th (2–9)	(Israel) Idan Avshalom	18 January 2026	
Hapoel Holon	(Israel) Yoav Shamir	Mutual Consent	8 February 2026	6th (9–7)	(Bosnia and Herzegovina) Predrag Krunić	9 February 2026	
Maccabi Ironi Ra'anana	(Israel) Shai Segalovich	Fired	22 February 2026	12th (3–15)	(Israel) Guni Israeli	23 February 2026	
Ironi Ness Ziona	(Israel) Meir Tapiro	Mutual Consent	10 April 2026	11th (5–13)	(United States) Paul Corsaro	10 April 2026	
Hapoel Be'er Sheva	(Israel) Rami Hadar	Mutual Consent	11 May 2026	8th (9–14)	(Israel) Yaniv Ravins	11 May 2026	

== Regular season ==
Pos	Team	Pld	W	L	PF	PA	PD	Pts	Qualification or relegation
1	Maccabi Tel Aviv	26	24	2	2585	2133	+452	50	Advance to the playoffs
2	Hapoel Tel Aviv	26	22	4	2358	2037	+321	48	Advance to the playoffs
3	Hapoel Jerusalem	26	18	8	2340	2170	+170	44	Advance to the playoffs
4	Bnei Herzliya	26	18	8	2421	2357	+64	44	Advance to the playoffs
5	Hapoel Holon	26	15	11	2243	2237	+6	41	Advance to the playoffs
6	Hapoel HaEmek	26	15	11	2149	2052	+97	41	Advance to the playoffs
7	Maccabi Rishon LeZion	26	12	14	2112	2153	−41	38	Advance to the playoffs
8	Hapoel Be'er Sheva/Dimona	26	10	16	2224	2331	−107	36	Advance to the playoffs
9	Maccabi Ironi Ramat Gan	26	10	16	2210	2270	−60	36	
10	Ironi Kiryat Ata	26	9	17	2236	2373	−137	35	
11	Ironi Ness Ziona	26	9	17	2092	2213	−121	35	Advance to playouts
12	Hapoel Galil Elyon	26	7	19	1959	2258	−299	33	Advance to playouts
13	Elitzur Netanya	26	7	19	2124	2302	−178	33	Advance to playouts
14	Maccabi Ironi Ra'anana	26	6	20	2148	2315	−167	32	Advance to playouts

Rules for classification:

=== Rounds 1 to 26 ===
Home \ Away	MTA	HTA	HJE	BNH	HHO	HAM	MRL	HBS	MRG	IKA	INZ	HGE	ENE	IRA
Maccabi Tel Aviv		97–115	95–84	137–75	102–75	89–64	104–73	81–69	84–81	102–77	111–80	108–51	102–92	95–75
Hapoel Tel Aviv	85–80		77–92	59–70 (Note: The game was stopped three minutes before the end of the first half after Hapoel Tel Aviv were left with only one player on the court, as all the other players had fouled out.)	89–83	76–68	91–76	112–108	91–62	97–82	89–63	98–66	75–66	98–75
Hapoel Jerusalem	105–112	105–91		102–81	95–103	65–69	87–74	103–87	88–69	96–68	79–65	77–62	100–69	102–99
Bnei Herzliya	99–114	86–94	95–80		91–82	96–94	89–83	88–92	104–81	88–96	90–73	105–89	108–107	89–79
Hapoel Holon	83–88	60–114	78–77	76–87		92–86	62–68	87–85	67–66	90–98	98–104	92–82	86–77	95–93
Hapoel HaEmek	88–98	75–79	75–77	95–94	78–87		89–75	90–81	94–83	77–64	88–83	96–66	79–59	90–79
Maccabi Rishon LeZion	83–94	77–88	93–100	90–95	78–70	103–98		87–84	87–99	97–69	92–73	79–75	80–71	93–78
Hapoel Be'er Sheva/Dimona	92–104	77–102	90–75	86–94	86–96	86–93	67–75		101–95	80–94	68–105	78–92	79–83	88–84
Maccabi Ironi Ramat Gan	91–98	81–91	87–97	88–104	110–104	63–89	84–67	92–97		100–98	100–83	83–71	76–77	87–89
Ironi Kiryat Ata	82–116	81–95	84–88	113–101	63–94	67–72	94–85	84–86	83–90		78–64	96–79	124–103	78–86
Ironi Ness Ziona	72–88	75–81	97–93	88–95	70–82	80–70	63–72	88–95	70–82	100–91		83–74	86–78	85–77
Hapoel Galil Elyon	65–86	90–89	76–81	75–88	76–103	75–65	64–88	70–77	71–82	113–108	55–81		79–74	67–77
Elitzur Netanya	88–94	70–93	81–97	88–102	95–108	64–78	72–68	77–83	95–93	94–80	95–91	78–85		102–77
Maccabi Ironi Ra'anana	89–106	72–89	93–95	96–107	79–90	71–89	93–69	80–102	70–85	80–84	92–70	86–91	79–69	

Legend: Blue = home team win; Red = away team win.
Matches with lighter background shading were decided after overtime.

== Playouts ==
Pos	Team	Pld	W	L	PF	PA	PD	Pts	Qualification or relegation	INZ	HGE	ENE	IRA
11	Ironi Ness Ziona	32	13	19	2616	2705	−89	45			65–76	88–102	96–70
12	Hapoel Galil Elyon	32	11	21	2437	2731	−294	43		83–92		89–84	79–68
13	Elitzur Netanya	32	9	23	2645	2829	−184	41	Relegation to Liga Leumit	84–91	83–87		89–77
14	Maccabi Ironi Ra'anana	32	8	24	2616	2814	−198	40	Relegation to Liga Leumit	77–92	81–64	95–79	

Rules for classification:

== Playoffs ==
Quarterfinals; 31 May–5 June
1	Maccabi Tel Aviv	106	108	–	2
8	Hapoel Be'er Sheva/Dimona	90	83	–	0
4	Bnei Herzliya	73	84	–	0
5	Hapoel Holon	84	99	–	2
2	Hapoel Tel Aviv	74	95	96	2
7	Maccabi Rishon LeZion	82	69	83	1
3	Hapoel Jerusalem	82	98	–	2
6	Hapoel HaEmek	71	91	–	0

Semifinals; 7–12 June
1	Maccabi Tel Aviv	107	84	89	–	–	3
5	Hapoel Holon	93	74	61	–	–	0
2	Hapoel Tel Aviv	20	88	89	–	–	3
3	Hapoel Jerusalem	1	84	81	–	–	0

Finals; 16–23 June
1	Maccabi Tel Aviv	96	102	74	83	–	3
2	Hapoel Tel Aviv	75	98	80	79	–	1

=== Quarterfinals ===
==== Game 1 ====
1 June	Maccabi Tel Aviv	106–90 (Series: 1–0)	Hapoel Be'er Sheva/Dimona	Tel Aviv
20:55	Scoring by quarter: 27–19, 25–24, 21–24, 33–23
	Pts: Hoard 20; Rebs: Hoard 7 Asts: Blatt 11; PIR: Hoard 30	Boxscore	Pts: Dunn 27; Rebs: Bickerstaff 7 Asts: Segal, Vitlem 5 PIR: Dunn 22	Arena: Menora Mivtachim Arena; Attendance: 7,939; Referees: Ofer Manheim, Kfir Mualem, Nir Keren

1 June	Bnei Herzliya	73–84 (Series: 0–1)	Hapoel Holon	Herzliya
18:35	Scoring by quarter: 20–27, 18–27, 24–13, 11–17
	Pts: Onuaku 16; Rebs: Onuaku 12; Asts: Bryant 6 PIR: Onuaku 22	Boxscore	Pts: Sanogo 17; Rebs: Sanogo 8 Asts: Kravitz 5 PIR: Taylor 18	Arena: HaYovel Herzliya; Attendance: 920; Referees: Omer Esteron, Elad Leibovich, Dvir Rainisch

31 May	Hapoel Tel Aviv	74–82 (Series: 0–1)	Maccabi Rishon LeZion	Tel Aviv
18:35	Scoring by quarter: 22–15, 23–28, 10–24, 19–15
	Pts: Madar 20; Rebs: Motley 7 Asts: Madar 5 PIR: Madar 24	Boxscore	Pts: Stevens 27; Rebs: Stevens 10; Asts: Grant 8 PIR: Stevens 32	Arena: Menora Mivtachim Arena; Attendance: 2,672; Referees: Dan Yalon, Guy Shmueli, Ori Shalhavi

31 May	Hapoel Jerusalem	82–71 (Series: 1–0)	Hapoel HaEmek	Jerusalem
20:55	Scoring by quarter: 18–16, 17–23, 30–9, 17–23
	Pts: Smith; Rebs: Mobley 5 Asts: Harper 8 PIR: Smith 22	Boxscore	Pts: Ongenda 16; Rebs: Ongenda 12; Asts: Henry 5 PIR: Ongenda 32	Arena: Pais Arena; Attendance: 3,824; Referees: Sefi Shemesh, Nir Meirson, Omer Wasserman

==== Game 2 ====
3 June	Hapoel Be'er Sheva/Dimona	83–108 (Series: 0–2)	Maccabi Tel Aviv	Be'er Sheva
18:30	Scoring by quarter: 25–24, 18–30, 16–25, 24–29
	Pts: Barnett 26; Rebs: Bickerstaff 8 Asts: Dunn, Segal 5 PIR: Barnett 26	Boxscore	Pts: Hoard 19; Rebs: Rayman 9 Asts: Lundberg, Blatt 8 PIR: Hoard, Sorkin 25	Arena: Conch Arena; Attendance: 1,972; Referees: Adar Pe'er, Omer Wasserman, Harel Kidron

3 June	Hapoel Holon	99–84 (Series: 2–0)	Bnei Herzliya	Holon
20:30	Scoring by quarter: 26–22, 23–23, 19–22, 31–17
	Pts: Sanogo 26; Rebs: Four players 6 Asts: Kravitz 7 PIR: Croft 30	Boxscore	Pts: Bryant 20; Rebs: Three players 8 Asts: Bryant 13; PIR: Bryant 33	Arena: Holon Toto Hall; Attendance: 3,500; Referees: Amit Balak, Guy Shmueli, Tzur Tuval

2 June	Maccabi Rishon LeZion	69–95 (Series: 1–1)	Hapoel Tel Aviv	Rishon LeZion
20:55	Scoring by quarter: 13–19, 18–23, 15–28, 23–25
	Pts: Stevens 19; Rebs: Kaplan 5 Asts: Goldman 5 PIR: Stevens 20	Boxscore	Pts: Motley 20; Rebs: Motley 8 Asts: Jones, Micić 6 PIR: Motley 28	Arena: Beit Maccabi Rishon; Attendance: 1,700; Referees: Sefi Shemesh, Ofer Manheim, Kfir Mualem

2 June	Hapoel HaEmek	91–98 (Series: 0–2)	Hapoel Jerusalem	Gan Ner
18:35	Scoring by quarter: 26–20, 22–30, 17–21, 26–27
	Pts: Noyovitch 25; Rebs: Brooks 6 Asts: Noyovitch 6 PIR: Noyovitch 22	Boxscore	Pts: Harper 26; Rebs: Mobley 8 Asts: Harper 8 PIR: Harper 35	Arena: Gan Ner Sports Hall; Attendance: 2,100; Referees: Omer Esteron, Zahi Habdali, Elad Leibovich

==== Game 3 ====
4 June	Hapoel Tel Aviv	96–83 (Series: 2–1)	Maccabi Rishon LeZion	Tel Aviv
20:55	Scoring by quarter: 25–16, 21–22, 22–28, 28–17
	Pts: Micić 23; Rebs: Motley, Wainright 6 Asts: Jones, Micić 7 PIR: Micić 30	Boxscore	Pts: Burns 20; Rebs: Burns 8 Asts: Burns 5 PIR: Burns 30	Arena: Menora Mivtachim Arena; Attendance: 2,900; Referees: Amit Balak, Adar Pe'er, Dvir Rainisch

=== Semifinals ===
==== Game 1 ====
8 June	Maccabi Tel Aviv	107–93 (Series: 1–0)	Hapoel Holon	Tel Aviv
20:50	Scoring by quarter: 30–23, 30–30, 19–19, 28–21
	Pts: Lundberg, Sorkin 21; Rebs: Hoard 10; Asts: Blatt 12; PIR: Three players 28	Boxscore	Pts: Green 21; Rebs: Zalmanson 5 Asts: Kravitz 12; PIR: Taylor 24	Arena: Menora Mivtachim Arena; Referees: Dan Yalon, Zahi Habdali, Guy Shmueli

7 June	Hapoel Tel Aviv	20–1 (Series: 2–0)	Hapoel Jerusalem	Tel Aviv
20:50
		Boxscore		Arena: Menora Mivtachim Arena; Attendance: 5,034; Referees: Omer Esteron, Ofer Manheim, Omer Wasserman
Note: The game, originally played on June 7, was halted at the end of the third quarter with Hapoel Tel Aviv leading 77–67 in order to evacuate the spectators from the arena following a change in Home Front Command guidelines. The change was prompted by Iranian missile launches toward northern Israel and concerns over additional attacks targeting cities in central Israel. After the crowd had left the arena, Hapoel Jerusalem announced that it would not return to the court to resume the game. On June 9, the disciplinary tribunal of the Israel Basketball Association ruled that the game would be replayed. On June 11, the Basketball Association's Supreme Court overturned the decision following appeals that had been filed and ruled a technical Forfeit loss against Hapoel Jerusalem.

==== Game 2 ====
10 June	Hapoel Holon	74–84 (Series: 0–2)	Maccabi Tel Aviv	Holon
20:50	Scoring by quarter: 9–23, 23–19, 11–22, 31–20
	Pts: Songo 22; Rebs: Sanogo 10; Asts: McCormick 5 PIR: Songo 26	Boxscore	Pts: Hoard 30; Rebs: Hoard 15; Asts: Lundberg 5 PIR: Hoard 45	Arena: Holon Toto Hall; Attendance: 4,050; Referees: Amit Balak, Nir Meirson, Dvir Rainisch

9 June	Hapoel Jerusalem	84–88 (Series: 0–1)	Hapoel Tel Aviv	Jerusalem
20:50	Scoring by quarter: 26–20, 14–23, 28–28, 16–17
	Pts: Carrington 16; Rebs: Ben Moshe 7 Asts: Harper 7 PIR: Carrington 23	Boxscore	Pts: Madar 25; Rebs: Motley 7 Asts: Micić 4 PIR: Madar 28	Arena: Pais Arena; Attendance: 4,763; Referees: Sefi Shemesh, Adar Pe'er, Elad Leibovich

==== Game 3 ====
12 June	Maccabi Tel Aviv	89–61 (Series: 3–0)	Hapoel Holon	Tel Aviv
15:00	Scoring by quarter: 20–11, 22–24, 25–9, 22–17
	Pts: Hoard 18; Rebs: Rayman 10; Asts: Clark 8 PIR: Hoard, Clark III 21	Boxscore	Pts: Wright 14; Rebs: Songo 7 Asts: Five players 2 PIR: Wright 14	Arena: Menora Mivtachim Arena; Attendance: 5,877; Referees: Sefi Shemesh, Adar Pe'er, Tzur Tuval

11 June	Hapoel Tel Aviv	89–81 (Series: 3–0)	Hapoel Jerusalem	Tel Aviv
20:50	Scoring by quarter: 21–19, 20–17, 25–30, 23–15
	Pts: Micić 26; Rebs: Wainright 5 Asts: Jones 7 PIR: Micić 31	Boxscore	Pts: Levi 22; Rebs: Levi 8 Asts: Harper 7 PIR: Levi 24	Arena: Menora Mivtachim Arena; Attendance: 4,182; Referees: Amit Balak, Dan Yalon, Guy Shmueli

=== Finals ===
16 June Game 1	Maccabi Tel Aviv	96–75 (Series: 1–0)	Hapoel Tel Aviv	Tel Aviv
20:50	Scoring by quarter: 25–16, 24–18, 23–18, 24–23
	Pts: Hoard 20; Rebs: Brissett 7 Asts: Lundberg 8 PIR: Hoard 24	Boxscore	Pts: Motley 12; Rebs: Micić 7 Asts: Madar 8 PIR: Motley 10	Arena: Menora Mivtachim Arena; Attendance: 8,278; Referees: Omer Esteron, Amit Balak, Ofer Manheim

18 June Game 2	Hapoel Tel Aviv	98–102 (Series: 0–2)	Maccabi Tel Aviv	Tel Aviv
20:50	Scoring by quarter: 20–20, 28–26, 25–33, 25–23
	Pts: Madar 34; Rebs: Madar, Blayzer 6 Asts: Madar 10; PIR: Madar 40	Boxscore	Pts: Lundberg 25; Rebs: Brissett 12; Asts: DiBartolomeo 4 PIR: Lundberg 32	Arena: Menora Mivtachim Arena; Attendance: 8,252; Referees: Sefi Shemesh, Dan Yalon, Elad Leibovich

21 June Game 3	Maccabi Tel Aviv	74–80 (Series: 2–1)	Hapoel Tel Aviv	Tel Aviv
20:50	Scoring by quarter: 20–25, 16–18, 19–13, 19–24
	Pts: Clark 24; Rebs: Brissett 12; Asts: Clark 7 PIR: Clark 23	Boxscore	Pts: Micić 29; Rebs: Ginat 7 Asts: Micić 10; PIR: Micić 29	Arena: Menora Mivtachim Arena; Attendance: 10,211; Referees: Omer Esteron, Amit Balak, Adar Pe'er

23 June Game 4	Hapoel Tel Aviv	79–83 (Series: 3–1)	Maccabi Tel Aviv	Tel Aviv
20:50	Scoring by quarter: 20–22, 23–20, 21–20, 15–21
	Pts: Madar 26; Rebs: Micić 7 Asts: Madar 9 PIR: Madar 29	Boxscore	Pts: Lundberg 21; Rebs: Brissett 6 Asts: Clark 4 PIR: Lundberg 22	Arena: Menora Mivtachim Arena; Attendance: 9,132; Referees: Sefi Shemesh, Amit Balak, Elad Leibovich

2025–26 Israeli Premier League champions
Maccabi Tel Aviv
58th title

== Awards ==
=== MVP of the Round ===
Round	Player	Team	EFF	Ref.
October
2	(United States) Kyler Edwards	Hapoel HaEmek	37	
3	(United States) Amin Stevens	Maccabi Rishon LeZion	34	
4	(Guyana) (United States) Cyril Langevine	Hapoel Galil Elyon	36	
November
6	(United States) Malik Hall	Ironi Kiryat Ata	43	
7	(United States) Lonnie Walker	Maccabi Tel Aviv	34	
December
8	(Israel) (Germany) Adam Ariel (1/2)	Maccabi Ironi Ramat Gan	28	
9	(United States) DJ Burns	Maccabi Rishon LeZion	34	
10	(Israel) Yam Madar (1/2)	Hapoel Tel Aviv	32	
11	(United States) C. J. Elleby	Hapoel Be'er Sheva/Dimona	44	
January
14	(United States) Jimmy Clark	Maccabi Tel Aviv	22	
15	(United States) Antonio Blakeney	Hapoel Tel Aviv	23	
February
16	(United States) Brandon Angel	Hapoel Be'er Sheva/Dimona	33	
17	(Israel) Gur Lavy	Maccabi Tel Aviv	34	
–
1	(United States) Jaylen Blakes	Hapoel Galil Elyon	23	
5	(United States) Chinanu Onuaku	Bnei Herzliya	44	
12	(Israel) (United States) Shawn Dawson	Bnei Herzliya	34	
13	(United States) Tyrece Radford	Maccabi Ironi Ra'anana	39	
18	(United States) Justin Smith	Hapoel Jerusalem	40	
19	(United States) Evan Bruinsma	Bnei Herzliya	50	
20	(United States) Otis Frazier	Elitzur Netanya	50	
21	(Israel) Yam Madar (2/2)	Hapoel Tel Aviv	42	
22	(Israel) (Germany) Adam Ariel (2/2)	Maccabi Ironi Ramat Gan	32	
23	(Israel) Shahar Amir	Hapoel Galil Elyon	27	
24	(Israel) Yair Kravitz	Hapoel Holon	32	
25	(Israel) Tomer Asayag	Ironi Kiryat Ata	23	
26	(United States) Javante McCoy	Elitzur Netanya	38	

=== Monthly Awards ===
==== Player of the Month ====
Month	Player	Team	EFF	Ref.
October	(United States) Kyler Edwards	Hapoel HaEmek	17.6	
November	(United States) Malik Hall	Ironi Kiryat Ata	26.8	
December	(United States) C. J. Elleby	Hapoel Be'er Sheva/Dimona	24.0	
January	(United States) Chinanu Onuaku	Bnei Herzliya	23.3	
April	(Mali) Adama Sanogo	Hapoel Holon	24.3	
May	(United States) Zack Bryant	Bnei Herzliya	21.2	

==== Israeli Player of the Month ====
Month	Player	Team	EFF	Ref.
October	(Israel) Tamir Blatt	Maccabi Tel Aviv	13.7	
November	(Israel) Niv Misgav	Hapoel HaEmek	15	
December	(Israel) Yoav Vitlem	Hapoel Be'er Sheva/Dimona	17.8	
January	(Israel) (Germany) Adam Ariel	Maccabi Ironi Ramat Gan	18.3	
April	(Israel) Idan Zalmanson	Hapoel Holon	18.6	
May	(Israel) Shahar Amir	Hapoel Galil Elyon	19.0	

==== Coach of the Month ====
Month	Coach	Team	W-L	Ref.
October	(Israel) Danny Franco	Hapoel Holon	3–0	
November	(Israel) Eldad Bentov	Ironi Kiryat Ata	4–0	
December	(Greece) Dimitrios Itoudis	Hapoel Tel Aviv	4–0	
January	(Israel) Oded Kattash	Maccabi Tel Aviv	4–0	
April	(Bosnia and Herzegovina) Predrag Krunić	Hapoel Holon	3–0	
May	(Israel) Guy Kaplan	Maccabi Rishon LeZion	4–2	

=== Yearly awards ===
Award	Winner	Team	Ref.
Regular season MVP	(United States) Jared Harper	Hapoel Jerusalem	
Regular season Israeli MVP	(Israel) (Belarus) Roman Sorkin	Maccabi Tel Aviv	
Best Defender	(United States) Daeshon Francis	Bnei Herzliya	
Sixth Man of the Year	(United States) Justin Smith	Hapoel Jerusalem	
Most Improved Player	(Israel) Yoav Vitlem	Hapoel Be'er Sheva/Dimona	
Rising Star	(Israel) Yuval Hochstadter	Ironi Kiryat Ata	
First Team	(Nigeria) (Puerto Rico) Tai Odiase	Hapoel Tel Aviv	
First Team	(United States) Jared Harper	Hapoel Jerusalem	
First Team	(United States) Jimmy Clark	Maccabi Tel Aviv	
First Team	(Israel) (Belarus) Roman Sorkin	Maccabi Tel Aviv	
First Team	(United States) Kyler Edwards	Hapoel HaEmek	
Coach of the Year	(Israel) Oded Kattash	Maccabi Tel Aviv	
Finals MVP	(Denmark) Gabriel Lundberg	Maccabi Tel Aviv	

== Israeli clubs in European competitions ==
European-wide competitions
Competition	Team	Progress
EuroLeague	Maccabi Tel Aviv	Regular season
EuroLeague	Hapoel Tel Aviv	Playoffs
EuroCup	Hapoel Jerusalem	Quarterfinals
Champions League	Hapoel Holon	Round of 16
Champions League	Bnei Herzliya	Regular season
