= 2024–25 Israeli Basketball Premier League =

Israeli Basketball Premier League
- Season: 2024–25
- Dates: 6 October 2024 – 15 June 2025
- Teams: 14
- TV partner: Sports Channel

Regular season
- Season MVP: (United States) Jared Harper
- Relegated: Elitzur Netanya; Hapoel Haifa

Finals
- Champions: Season Cancelled
- Runners-up: Season Cancelled
- Semi-finalists: Hapoel Holon; Hapoel Tel Aviv

Awards
- Israeli MVP: (Israel) Gur Lavy
- Rising Star: (Israel) Yuval Levin
- Best Defender: (Israel) Yovel Zoosman
- Most Improved: (Israel) Gur Lavy
- Sixth Man: (Israel) Roi Huber
- Coach of the Year: (Greece) Dimitrios Itoudis

The 2024–25 Israeli Basketball Premier League, for sponsorship reasons Ligat Winner, was the 71st season of the Israeli Basketball Premier League. The season started in October 2024.

The season was cancelled before the last championship game of the Finals between Maccabi Tel Aviv and Hapoel Jerusalem due to the Twelve-Day War, and ended without a champion.

== Format ==
The regular season played in a 26-round (13 round-robin format). The top 6 finishers Advance to the playoffs, will the 7th to 10th-ranked teams face each other in the play-in showdown. Each game is hosted by the team with the higher regular season record. The format is similar to the first two rounds of the Page–McIntyre system for a four-team playoff, and is identical to that of the NBA play-in tournament. First, the 7th seed hosts the 8th seed, with the winner advancing to the playoffs; likewise the 9th seed hosts the 10th seed, with the loser eliminated. Then the loser of the 7-v-8 game hosts the winner of the 9-v-10 game, with the winner of that game getting the final playoff spot. the 11th to 14th-ranked teams played in a 4-round (2 round-robin format), the bottom two teams relegated to Liga Leumit

== Teams ==
Teams of the 2024–25 Israeli Basketball Premier League

Hapoel Eilat has been relegated to 2024–25 National League after placing in the bottom place of the 2023–24 Premier League. Hapoel Gilboa Galil and Elitzur Netanya has been promoted to the league after win for the 2023–24 National League semi-final Series .

=== Stadia and locations ===
Team	Home city	Stadium	Capacity
Bnei Herzliya	Herzliya	HaYovel Herzliya	1,500
Elitzur Netanya	Netanya	Netanya Arena	2,500
Hapoel Afula	Afula	Nir Ha'emak Hall	1,000
Hapoel Be'er Sheva/Dimona	Be'er Sheva and Dimona	Conch Arena	3,000
Hapoel Galil Elyon	Upper Galilee	HaPais Kfar Blum	2,000
Hapoel Gilboa Galil	Gilboa Regional and Lower Galilee	Gan Ner Sports Hall	2,057
Hapoel Haifa	Haifa	Romema Arena	5,000
Hapoel Holon	Holon	Holon Toto Hall	5,500
Hapoel Jerusalem	Jerusalem	Pais Arena	11,000
Hapoel Tel Aviv	Tel Aviv	Menora Mivtachim Arena	10,383
Ironi Kiryat Ata	Kiryat Ata	Ramaz Hall	1,200
Ironi Ness Ziona	Ness Ziona	Lev Hamoshava	1,300
Maccabi Ironi Ramat Gan	Ramat Gan	Zisman Hall	1,500
Maccabi Tel Aviv	Tel Aviv	Menora Mivtachim Arena	10,383

=== Personnel and sponsorship ===
Team	Chairman	Head coach	Team captain	Kit manufacturer	Main sponsor
Bnei Herzliya	(Israel) Eldad Akunis	(Israel) Yehu Orland	(France) (Israel) Frédéric Bourdillon	Peak	PenLink
Elitzur Netanya	(Israel) Avidan Nager	(Israel) Ruven Najberger (Israel) Idan Avshalom	(Israel) Roy Paretsky (Israel) Ariel Aizik	Peak	Briga
Hapoel Afula	(Israel) Yossi Malka	(Israel) Ariel Beit-Halahmy	(Israel) Muriel Lutati	Reebok	
Hapoel Be'er Sheva/Dimona	(Israel) Kfir Arazi	(Israel) Rami Hadar	(Israel) Neta Segal	Kempa	Altshuler Shacham
Hapoel Galil Elyon	(Israel) Tamir Abrahams	(Israel) Guni Israeli	(Israel) Lior Carreira	Peak	Rivulis
Hapoel Gilboa Galil	(Israel) Gideon Yadin	(Israel) Sharon Avrahami	(Israel) Roey Netzia	Reebok	Innovate
Hapoel Haifa	(Israel) Yuval Rosman	(Israel) Roee Perl	(Israel) Amit Gershon	Reebok	Shoval Engineering
Hapoel Holon	(Israel) Eitan Lanciano	(Israel) Guy Kaplan	(Israel) Niv Misgav	Kelme	Netanel Groups
Hapoel Jerusalem	(Israel) (United States) Matan Edelson	(Israel) Yonatan Alon	(Israel) Yovel Zoosman	Nike	Bank Yahav
Hapoel Tel Aviv	(Israel) Offer Yanai	(Greece) Dimitrios Itoudis	(Israel) Bar Timor	Reebok	Shlomo Insurance
Ironi Kiryat Ata	(Israel) Naftali Bentov	(Israel) Eldad Bentov	(Israel) Yariv Amiram	Reebok	Lati Construction
Ironi Ness Ziona	(Israel) Yaniv Mizrahi	(Israel) Amit Schaerf	(Israel) Tzuf Ben Moshe	Nike	Chai Motors
Maccabi Ironi Ramat Gan	(Israel) Chen Shnaiderman	(Israel) Shmulik Brenner	(Israel) Adam Ariel	Peak	Cnanan Groups
Maccabi Tel Aviv	(Israel) Shimon Mizrahi	(Israel) Oded Kattash	(United States) (Israel) John DiBartolomeo	Puma	Playtika

=== Managerial changes ===
Team	Outgoing manager	Manner of departure	Date of vacancy	Position in table	Replaced with	Date of appointment	Ref.
Hapoel Tel Aviv	(Greece) Stefanos Dedas	Mutual Consent	15 November 2024	3rd (6–0)	(Greece) Dimitrios Itoudis	15 November 2024	
Hapoel Be'er Sheva/Dimona	(Israel) Oren Aharoni	Fired	16 November 2024	13th (2–3)	(Israel) Rami Hadar	17 November 2024	
Hapoel Haifa	(Israel) Elad Hasin	Resigned	12 December 2024	14th (1–8)	(Israel) Roee Perl	13 December 2024	
Hapoel Holon	(Israel) Guy Goodes	Mutual Consent	23 January 2025	6th (9–5)	(Israel) Guy Kaplan	4 February 2025	
Hapoel Haifa	(Israel) Roee Perl	Resigned	20 March 2025	14th (2–18)	(Israel) Ilan Amar	21 March 2025	

== Regular season ==
Pos	Team	Pld	W	L	PF	PA	PD	Pts	Qualification or relegation
1	Maccabi Tel Aviv	26	22	4	2333	2110	+223	48	Advance to the playoffs
2	Hapoel Tel Aviv	26	23	3	2347	2015	+332	48 (Note: The Disciplinary Court of the Israel Basketball Association partially imposed a suspended sentence against Hapoel Tel Aviv and deducted one point from its balance in the 2024/25 season, following the lighting of flares during the final series games in the 2023/24 season.)	Advance to the playoffs
3	Hapoel Jerusalem	26	20	6	2281	2028	+253	46	Advance to the playoffs
4	Bnei Herzliya	26	15	11	2285	2326	−41	41	Advance to the playoffs
5	Hapoel Holon	26	14	12	2111	2072	+39	40	Advance to the playoffs
6	Maccabi Ironi Ramat Gan	26	13	13	2242	2175	+67	39	Advance to the playoffs
7	Ironi Ness Ziona	26	12	14	2198	2210	−12	38	Advance to the play-in
8	Hapoel Gilboa Galil	26	12	14	2114	2114	0	38	Advance to the play-in
9	Hapoel Be'er Sheva/Dimona	26	12	14	2193	2221	−28	38	Advance to the play-in
10	Hapoel Galil Elyon	26	11	15	2016	2114	−98	37	Advance to the play-in
11	Hapoel Afula	26	9	17	2139	2187	−48	35	Advance to playouts
12	Elitzur Netanya	26	8	18	2051	2238	−187	34	Advance to playouts
13	Ironi Kiryat Ata	26	8	18	2108	2285	−177	34	Advance to playouts
14	Hapoel Haifa	26	3	23	2154	2477	−323	29	Advance to playouts

Rules for classification:

=== Rounds 1 to 26 ===
Home \ Away	MTA	HTA	HJE	BNH	HHO	MRG	INZ	HGG	HBS	HGE	HAF	ENE	IKA	HHA
Maccabi Tel Aviv		97–79	83–95	105–82	86–83	94–87	85–81	89–83	77–62	73–60	92–89	99–83	93–80	102–87
Hapoel Tel Aviv	76–70		77–92	97–79	84–68	88–82	100–77	94–74	82–83	99–77	85–62	96–85	96–95	114–99
Hapoel Jerusalem	101–84	72–85		94–79	91–66	86–87	94–89	85–75	83–81	84–80	80–78	93–76	89–66	106–83
Bnei Herzliya	106–101	91–95	68–66		89–80	88–86	84–86	88–83	87–81	85–79	99–92	88–91	90–77	100–92
Hapoel Holon	72–79	68–72	79–85	84–71		77–67	91–85	80–89	88–82	80–77	82–74	97–64	87–72	89–71
Maccabi Ironi Ramat Gan	87–98	82–91	75–82	89–75	90–88		108–84	79–83	85–78	81–83	85–82	98–86	93–75	89–79
Ironi Ness Ziona	98–103	54–90	74–81	93–83	72–60	61–76		101–83	107–97	74–76	87–74	91–72	97–82	86–68
Hapoel Gilboa Galil	73–80	56–73	81–89	86–93	79–83	78–74	88–83		78–83	77–93	84–76	100–67	85–60	100–81
Hapoel Be'er Sheva/Dimona	75–93	88–98	68–104	97–98	81–101	104–84	90–85	72–88		89–84	78–73	88–69	86–77	81–87
Hapoel Galil Elyon	67–79	64–79	87–82	87–93	67–70	80–96	77–65	76–69	60–74		88–77	69–65	97–82	87–69
Hapoel Afula	75–87	74–99	84–82	111–97	86–76	68–84	96–86	96–62	92–93	87–65		86–78	76–88	86–74
Elitzur Netanya	72–76	70–96	74–98	80–85	87–83	95–89	75–80	66–83	80–96	88–56	92–84		89–74	78–75
Ironi Kiryat Ata	90–102	77–94	88–85	93–78	92–98	93–83	88–103	70–83	84–79	85–64	67–84	64–84		89–84
Hapoel Haifa	67–106	79–108	61–82	101–109	80–81	79–106	89–99	83–94	77–107	112–116	97–77	94–85	86–100	

Legend: Blue = home team win; Red = away team win.
Matches with lighter background shading were decided after overtime.

== Playouts ==
Pos	Team	Pld	W	L	PF	PA	PD	Pts	Qualification or relegation	IKA	HAF	ENE	HHA
11	Ironi Kiryat Ata	32	13	19	2600	2762	−162	45			77–86	75–73	90–85
12	Hapoel Afula	32	12	20	2645	2678	−33	44		69–72		86–83	88–90
13	Elitzur Netanya	32	11	21	2544	2730	−186	43	Relegation to Liga Leumit	69–82	81–76		92–85
14	Hapoel Haifa	32	4	28	2685	3039	−354	36	Relegation to Liga Leumit	95–96	88–101	88–95	

Rules for classification:

== Play-in ==
Round 1
Play-In A: April 26, 20:20
Ironi Ness Ziona	83
Hapoel Gilboa Galil	91
Play-In B: April 26, 21:00
Hapoel Be'er Sheva/Dimona	77
Hapoel Galil Elyon	64

Round 2
Play-In C: April 28, 21:05
Ironi Ness Ziona	83
Hapoel Be'er Sheva/Dimona	74

=== Round 1 ===
26 April 2025	Ironi Ness Ziona	83–91	Hapoel Gilboa Galil	Ness Ziona
20:20	Scoring by quarter: 20–28, 28–15, 22–23, 13–25
	Pts: Brown, Van Tubbergen 18; Rebs: Van Tubbergen 10; Asts: Kravitz 6 PIR: Van Tubbergen 23	Boxscore	Pts: Misgav 22; Rebs: Lavy 6 Asts: Misgav 8 PIR: Misgav 30	Arena: Lev Hamoshava

26 April 2025	Hapoel Be'er Sheva/Dimona	77–64	Hapoel Galil Elyon	Be'er Sheva
21:00	Scoring by quarter: 14–16, 19–18, 25–20, 19–10
	Pts: Demps 17; Rebs: McKoy 11; Asts: Weisz 4 PIR: Demps 19	Boxscore	Pts: Alkins 21; Rebs: Freeman, Goldenberg 8 Asts: Goldenberg 6 PIR: Alkins 21	Arena: Conch Arena; Attendance: 980

=== Round 2 ===
28 April 2025	Ironi Ness Ziona	83–74	Hapoel Be'er Sheva/Dimona	Ness Ziona
21:05	Scoring by quarter: 23–23, 20–12, 20–13, 20–26
	Pts: Lindo 25; Rebs: Ben Moshe 10; Asts: Kravitz 8 PIR: Lindo 26	Boxscore	Pts: Molinar 25; Rebs: Santos-Silva 13; Asts: Molinar, Weisz 6 PIR: Santos-Silva 20	Arena: Lev Hamoshava; Attendance: 900

== Playoffs ==
Quarterfinals; 2–18 May
1	Maccabi Tel Aviv	96	83	98	–	–	3
8	Ironi Ness Ziona	73	65	75	–	–	0
4	Bnei Herzliya	78	94	94	96	81	2
5	Hapoel Holon	86	99	86	95	83	3
2	Hapoel Tel Aviv	103	93	86	–	–	3
7	Hapoel Gilboa Galil	95	78	72	–	–	0
3	Hapoel Jerusalem	81	102	87	–	–	3
6	Maccabi Ironi Ramat Gan	58	100	61	–	–	0

Semifinals; 23 May–3 June
1	Maccabi Tel Aviv	90	85	–	2
5	Hapoel Holon	81	73	–	0
2	Hapoel Tel Aviv	88	87	83	1
3	Hapoel Jerusalem	85	98	86	2

Finals; 9–15 June
1	Maccabi Tel Aviv	91	74	C	1
3	Hapoel Jerusalem	88	77	C	1

=== Quarterfinals ===
==== Game 1 ====
4 May 2025	Maccabi Tel Aviv	96–73 (Series: 1–0)	Ironi Ness Ziona	Tel Aviv
20:50	Scoring by quarter: 24–20, 17–19, 34–21, 21–13
	Pts: Hoard 17; Rebs: Tyus 7 Asts: Blatt 6 PIR: Hoard 23	Boxscore	Pts: Brown 15; Rebs: Lindo 9 Asts: Brown 6 PIR: Brown 15	Arena: Menora Mivtachim Arena; Attendance: 7,352; Referees: Ofer Manheim, Nir Meirson, Assaf Engelberg

4 May 2025	Bnei Herzliya	78–86 (Series: 0–1)	Hapoel Holon	Herzliya
18:30	Scoring by quarter: 16–21, 16–22, 23–19, 23–24
	Pts: Stewart 24; Rebs: Onuaku 11; Asts: Johnson 11; PIR: Onuaku 24	Boxscore	Pts: Davis 22; Rebs: Artzi 7 Asts: Cooper 11; PIR: Ziv 19	Arena: HaYovel; Attendance: 820; Referees: Omer Esteron, Elad Leibovich, Guy Shmueli

3 May 2025	Hapoel Tel Aviv	103–95 (Series: 1–0)	Hapoel Gilboa Galil	Tel Aviv
21:00	Scoring by quarter: 25–27, 26–20, 28–30, 24–18
	Pts: Ginat 26; Rebs: Ginat 10; Asts: Timor 5 PIR: Ginat 32	Boxscore	Pts: Misgav 19; Rebs: Three players 3 Asts: Misgav 7 PIR: Misgav 25	Arena: Menora Mivtachim Arena; Referees: Adar Pe'er, Noam Gordon, Tzur Tuval

2 May 2025	Hapoel Jerusalem	81–58 (Series: 1–0)	Maccabi Ironi Ramat Gan	Jerusalem
13:30	Scoring by quarter: 18–10, 18–16, 26–18, 19–14
	Pts: Carrington 17; Rebs: Wiley 10; Asts: Harper 8 PIR: Zoosman 18	Boxscore	Pts: McCullum 15; Rebs: Ariel, Crawford 6 Asts: Ariel, Dovrat 3 PIR: Crawford 16	Arena: Pais Arena; Attendance: 6,223; Referees: Amit Balak, Zahi Habdali, Omer Wasserman

==== Game 2 ====
8 May 2025	Ironi Ness Ziona	65–83 (Series: 0–2)	Maccabi Tel Aviv	Ness Ziona
20:50	Scoring by quarter: 20–18, 11–24, 15–13, 19–18
	Pts: Lindo 19; Rebs: Lindo 9 Asts: Brown, Kravitz 4 PIR: Lindo 23	Boxscore	Pts: Jokubaitis 12; Rebs: Cohen 8 Asts: Jokubaitis 6 PIR: Jokubaitis 16	Arena: Lev Hamoshava; Attendance: 1,200; Referees: Dan Yalon, Zahi Habdali, David Izmirli

8 May 2025	Hapoel Holon	99–94 (Series: 2–0)	Bnei Herzliya	Holon
18:30	Scoring by quarter: 37–30, 16–21, 27–18, 19–25
	Pts: Alston 30; Rebs: Alston 6 Asts: Cooper 14; PIR: Alston 31	Boxscore	Pts: Stewart 28; Rebs: Onuaku 9 Asts: Johnson 10; PIR: Stewart 25	Arena: Holon Toto Hall; Referees: Sefi Shemesh, Adar Pe'er, Or Zrur

6 May 2025	Hapoel Gilboa Galil	78–93 (Series: 0–2)	Hapoel Tel Aviv	Gan Ner
18:45	Scoring by quarter: 24–23, 21–21, 20–25, 13–24
	Pts: Lavy 22; Rebs: Scruggs 6 Asts: Misgav 8 PIR: Misgav 24	Boxscore	Pts: Timor 17; Rebs: Bingham, Wainright 7 Asts: Timor 7 PIR: Timor 26	Arena: Gan Ner Sports Hall; Attendance: 1,800; Referees: Amit Balak, Nir Meirson, Harel Kidron

7 May 2025	Maccabi Ironi Ramat Gan	100–102(OT) (Series: 0–2)	Hapoel Jerusalem	Ramat Gan
18:45	Scoring by quarter: 22–20, 26–22, 22–21, 17–24, Overtime: 13–15
	Pts: McCullum 31; Rebs: Feazell 7 Asts: McCullum 11; PIR: McCullum 35	Boxscore	Pts: Carrington 22; Rebs: Wiley 14; Asts: Harper 6 PIR: Carrington 25	Arena: Zisman Hall; Attendance: 1,500; Referees: Omer Esteron, Kfir Mualem, Dvir Rainisch

==== Game 3 ====
11 May 2025	Maccabi Tel Aviv	98–75 (Series: 3–0)	Ironi Ness Ziona	Tel Aviv
21:00	Scoring by quarter: 26–21, 22–19, 25–13, 25–22
	Pts: Williams 18; Rebs: Cohen, Williams 8 Asts: Blatt 7 PIR: Williams 21	Boxscore	Pts: Brown 24; Rebs: Segev 9 Asts: Brown 5 PIR: Brown 20	Arena: Menora Mivtachim Arena; Attendance: 7,231; Referees: Adar Pe'er, Elad Leibovich, Pini Rimon

11 May 2025	Bnei Herzliya	94–86 (Series: 1–2)	Hapoel Holon	Herzliya
18:40	Scoring by quarter: 31–22, 18–21, 22–22, 23–21
	Pts: Onuaku 22; Rebs: Lugashi 11; Asts: Lugashi 8 PIR: Lugashi 35	Boxscore	Pts: Tucker 19; Rebs: Artzi 7 Asts: Cooper 9 PIR: Kyser 24	Arena: HaYovel; Referees: Amit Balak, Kfir Mualem, Dvir Rainisch

9 May 2025	Hapoel Tel Aviv	86–72 (Series: 3–0)	Hapoel Gilboa Galil	Tel Aviv
15:30	Scoring by quarter: 21–23, 22–9, 20–24, –16
	Pts: Blakeney 17; Rebs: Motley, Bingham 6 Asts: Timor 8 PIR: Bingham 21	Boxscore	Pts: Lavy 16; Rebs: Childs 6 Asts: Misgav 6 PIR: Lavy 23	Arena: Menora Mivtachim Arena; Attendance: 5,183; Referees: Sefi Shemesh, Zahi Habdali, Omer Wasserman

10 May 2025	Hapoel Jerusalem	87–61 (Series: 3–0)	Maccabi Ironi Ramat Gan	Jerusalem
21:05	Scoring by quarter: 19–18, 22–16, 21–11, 25–16
	Pts: Smith 16; Rebs: Levi 8 Asts: Three players 4 PIR: Smith 26	Boxscore	Pts: Feazell, McCullum 13; Rebs: Crawford 6 Asts: McCullum 8 PIR: McCullum 17	Arena: Pais Arena; Attendance: 5,056; Referees: Ofer Manheim, Dan Yalon, Rotem Kuza

==== Game 4 ====
14 May 2025	Hapoel Holon	95–96 (Series: 2–2)	Bnei Herzliya	Holon
20:50	Scoring by quarter: 28–23, 25–28, 25–23, 17–22
	Pts: Davis 25; Rebs: Ziv 8 Asts: Cooper 8 PIR: Ziv 23	Boxscore	Pts: Johnson 28; Rebs: Lugashi, Onuaku 7 Asts: Johnson 10; PIR: Johnson 34	Arena: Holon Toto Hall; Attendance: 4,000; Referees: Omer Esteron, Zahi Habdali, Elad Leibovich

==== Game 5 ====
18 May 2025	Bnei Herzliya	81–83 (Series: 2–3)	Hapoel Holon	Herzliya
20:50	Scoring by quarter: 11–22, 28–19, 21–23, 21–19
	Pts: Stewart 22; Rebs: Meeks, Onuaku 6 Asts: Johnson 7 PIR: Stewart 22	Boxscore	Pts: Kyser 18; Rebs: Cooper 7 Asts: Cooper 10; PIR: Ziv 19	Arena: HaYovel; Attendance: 1,240; Referees: Sefi Shemesh, Ofer Manheim, Dan Yalon

=== Semifinals ===
==== Game 1 ====
26 May 2025	Maccabi Tel Aviv	90–81 (Series: 1–0)	Hapoel Holon	Tel Aviv
20:50	Scoring by quarter: 21–21, 25–15, 22–24, 22–21
	Pts: Sorkin 20; Rebs: Sorkin 10; Asts: Blatt 7 PIR: Sorkin 30	Boxscore	Pts: Tucker 22; Rebs: Zalmanson 6 Asts: Cooper 11; PIR: Tucker 20	Arena: Menora Mivtachim Arena; Attendance: 9,682; Referees: Sefi Shemesh, Ofer Manheim, Nir Meirson

23 May 2025	Hapoel Tel Aviv	88–85 (Series: 1–0)	Hapoel Jerusalem	Tel Aviv
15:30	Scoring by quarter: 24–18, 25–26, 15–29, 24–12
	Pts: Motley 20; Rebs: Ginat 9 Asts: Timor 7 PIR: Motley 25	Boxscore	Pts: Harper 20; Rebs: Wiley 10; Asts: Harper 7 PIR: Johnson 26	Arena: Menora Mivtachim Arena; Attendance: 9,492; Referees: Omer Esteron, Amit Balak, Elad Leibovich

==== Game 2 ====
30 May 2025	Hapoel Holon	73–85 (Series: 0–2)	Maccabi Tel Aviv	Holon
16:00	Scoring by quarter: 20–17, 17–27, 22–20, 14–21
	Pts: Davis 23; Rebs: Three players 5 Asts: Cooper 7 PIR: Davis 24	Boxscore	Pts: Hoard 18; Rebs: Williams, Randolph 10; Asts: Blatt 10; PIR: Hoard 26	Arena: Holon Toto Hall; Attendance: 5,500; Referees: Omer Esteron, Dan Yalon, Adar Pe'er

28 May 2025	Hapoel Jerusalem	98–87 (Series: 1–1)	Hapoel Tel Aviv	Jerusalem
20:50	Scoring by quarter: 20–21, 29–14, 22–23, 27–29
	Pts: Harper 31; Rebs: Wiley 12; Asts: Huber 5 PIR: Harper 31	Boxscore	Pts: Ginat 19; Rebs: Ginat 9 Asts: Ginat 5 PIR: Ginat 28	Arena: Pais Arena; Attendance: 9,764; Referees: Sefi Shemesh, Ofer Manheim, Zahi Habdali

==== Game 3 ====
3 June 2025	Hapoel Tel Aviv	83–86 (Series: 1–2)	Hapoel Jerusalem	Tel Aviv
20:50	Scoring by quarter: 20–19, 23–24, 25–11, 15–32
	Pts: Blakeney 21; Rebs: Ginat 6 Asts: Timor, Madar 5 PIR: Motley 20	Boxscore	Pts: Harper 19; Rebs: Wiley 10; Asts: Huber 6 PIR: Huber 20	Arena: Menora Mivtachim Arena; Attendance: 10,324; Referees: Sefi Shemesh, Omer Esteron, Amit Balak

=== Finals ===
9 June 2025 Game 1	Maccabi Tel Aviv	91–88 (Series: 1–0)	Hapoel Jerusalem	Tel Aviv
20:50	Scoring by quarter: 24–22, 20–24, 23–23, 24–19
	Pts: Hoard 18; Rebs: Hoard, Williams 9 Asts: Jokubaitis 8 PIR: Hoard 25	Boxscore	Pts: Harper 19; Rebs: Wiley, Zoosman 6 Asts: Harper 8 PIR: Harper 19	Arena: Menora Mivtachim Arena; Attendance: 10,914; Referees: Omer Esteron, Ofer Manheim, Adar Pe'er

12 June 2025 Game 2	Hapoel Jerusalem	77–74(OT) (Series: 1–1)	Maccabi Tel Aviv	Jerusalem
20:50	Scoring by quarter: 9–17, 21–18, 18–14, 18–17, Overtime: 11–8
	Pts: Harper 26; Rebs: Smith, Levi 8 Asts: Harper, Zoosman 4 PIR: Smith 25	Boxscore	Pts: Jokubaitis 23; Rebs: Williams 8 Asts: Jokubaitis 5 PIR: Sorkin 21	Arena: Pais Arena; Attendance: 11,595; Referees: Sefi Shemesh, Amit Balak, Nir Meirson

Cancelled Game 3	Maccabi Tel Aviv	vs.	Hapoel Jerusalem	Tel Aviv
				Arena: Menora Mivtachim Arena
Note: In light of the war between Israel and Iran, the league administration has decided to cancel game number 3 in the final series and that no champion will be crowned for the season.

- The season was cancelled before the last championship game of the Finals due to the Twelve-Day War with Iran.

== Awards ==
=== MVP of the Round ===
Round	Player	Team	EFF	Ref.
October
2	(United States) Marcus Bingham	Hapoel Holon	39	
3	(Israel) Tomer Ginat	Hapoel Tel Aviv	27	
4	(United States) Chavaughn Lewis	Ironi Kiryat Ata	36	
November
5	(United States) Jared Harper (1/3)	Hapoel Jerusalem	26	
6	(Gabon) Chris Silva (1/2)	Bnei Herzliya	32	
8	(United States) Justyn Mutts	Hapoel Afula	26	
December
9	(France) Jaylen Hoard	Maccabi Tel Aviv	32	
10	(Israel) Roman Sorkin	Maccabi Tel Aviv	28	
11	(United States) Jared Harper (2/3)	Hapoel Jerusalem	30	
12	(Israel) Yiftach Ziv	Hapoel Holon	30	
January
13	(Israel) Roi Huber	Maccabi Ironi Ramat Gan	14	
14	(United States) Liam O'Reilly	Ironi Kiryat Ata	30	
15	(Israel) Gur Lavy	Hapoel Gilboa Galil	33	
February
16	(Panama) Iverson Molinar	Hapoel Be'er Sheva/Dimona	30	
17	(Angola) Silvio De Sousa	Ironi Kiryat Ata	48	
March
18	(United States) Bryce Brown	Ironi Ness Ziona	26	
19	(Israel) Yam Madar	Hapoel Tel Aviv	31	
20	(Gabon) Chris Silva (2/2)	Bnei Herzliya	36	
21	(United States) Jake Van Tubbergen	Ironi Ness Ziona	53	
22	(United States) Justin McKoy	Hapoel Be'er Sheva/Dimona	33	
April
23	(United States) Jared Harper (3/3)	Hapoel Jerusalem	31	
25	(Canada) Marcus Carr	Hapoel Galil Elyon	29	
26	(United States) Carlos Marshall	Elitzur Netanya	24	
–
1	(United States) Johnathan Motley	Hapoel Tel Aviv	32	
7	(United States) Ishmael El-Amin	Hapoel Gilboa Galil	23	
24	(United States) Elijah Stewart	Bnei Herzliya	35	

=== Monthly Awards ===
==== Player of the Month ====
Month	Player	Team	EFF	Ref.
October	(United States) Jimmy Clark	Bnei Herzliya	17.8	
November	(United States) Jared Harper	Hapoel Jerusalem	24.3	
December	(United States) J'Covan Brown	Hapoel Afula	22.3	
January	(United States) Amin Stevens	Maccabi Ironi Ramat Gan	21.8	
February–March	(United States) Trevion Williams	Maccabi Tel Aviv	16.3	

==== Israeli Player of the Month ====
Month	Player	Team	EFF	Ref.
October	(Israel) Gur Lavy	Hapoel Gilboa Galil	18.3	
November	(Israel) Ethan Burg	Bnei Herzliya	14.2	
December	(Israel) Yovel Zoosman	Hapoel Jerusalem	18.8	
January	(Israel) Roi Huber	Maccabi Ironi Ramat Gan	13.3	
February–March	(Israel) Yam Madar	Hapoel Tel Aviv	20.8	

==== Coach of the Month ====
Month	Coach	Team	W-L	Ref.
October	(Israel) Yehu Orland	Bnei Herzliya	3–1	
November	(Israel) Yonatan Alon (1/2)	Hapoel Jerusalem	3–0	
December	(Israel) Yonatan Alon (2/2)	Hapoel Jerusalem	4–1	
January	(Israel) Shmulik Brenner	Maccabi Ironi Ramat Gan	4–0	
February–March	(Greece) Dimitrios Itoudis	Hapoel Tel Aviv	7–1	

=== Yearly awards ===
Award	Winner	Team	Ref.
Regular season MVP	(United States) Jared Harper	Hapoel Jerusalem	
Regular season Israeli MVP	(Israel) Gur Lavy	Hapoel Gilboa Galil	
Best Defender	(Israel) Yovel Zoosman	Hapoel Jerusalem	
Sixth Man of the Year	(Israel) Roi Huber	Hapoel Jerusalem	
Most Improved Player	(Israel) Gur Lavy	Hapoel Gilboa Galil	
Rising Star	(Israel) Yuval Levin	Ironi Kiryat Ata	
First Team	(United States) Jared Harper	Hapoel Jerusalem	
First Team	(United States) Kendale McCullum	Maccabi Ironi Ramat Gan	
First Team	(Israel) Gur Lavy	Hapoel Gilboa Galil	
First Team	(Israel) Roman Sorkin	Maccabi Tel Aviv	
First Team	(United States) Johnathan Motley	Hapoel Tel Aviv	
Second Team	Not awarded		
Coach of the Year	(Greece) Dimitrios Itoudis	Hapoel Tel Aviv	
Finals MVP	Not awarded		

== Israeli clubs in European competitions ==
European-wide competitions
Competition	Team	Progress
EuroLeague	Maccabi Tel Aviv	Regular season
EuroCup	Hapoel Tel Aviv	Champion
EuroCup	Hapoel Jerusalem	Quarterfinals
Champions League	Hapoel Holon	Play-ins
Champions League	Maccabi Ironi Ramat Gan	Play-ins
