= 2022–23 Israeli Basketball Premier League =

69th season of the Israeli Basketball Premier League

Israeli Basketball Premier League
- Season: 2022–23
- Dates: 7 October 2022 – 13 June 2023
- Teams: 12
- TV partner: Sports Channel

Regular season
- Season MVP: (United States) Zach Hankins
- Relegated: Hapoel Gilboa Galil

Finals
- Champions: Maccabi Tel Aviv
- Runners-up: Hapoel Tel Aviv
- Semifinalists: Hapoel Jerusalem; Hapoel Holon
- Finals MVP: (United States) Wade Baldwin

Awards
- Israeli MVP: (Israel) Tomer Ginat
- Rising Star: (Israel) Roy Paretsky
- Best Defender: (Israel) Or Cornelius
- Most Improved: (Israel) Itay Moskovich
- Sixth Man: (Israel) Bar Timor
- Coach of the Year: (Serbia) Aleksandar Džikić

Statistical leaders
Points	(United States) Tyler Bey	20.3
Rebounds	(United States) Zach Hankins	10.1
Assists	(United States) D. J. Cooper	13.9

The 2022–23 Israeli Basketball Premier League, for sponsorship reasons Ligat Winner, is the 69th season of the Israeli Basketball Premier League. The league started on 7 October 2022.

== Format ==
The regular season will be played in a 22-round round-robin format. The top 6 finishers will play the 5 rounds "upper house", with the other 6 teams playing the 5 rounds "bottom house". The 6 upper group teams, joined by the top 2 teams from the bottom group, will play the quarter finals as Best-of-5 series. The semifinals and finals will be played as Best-of-3 series.

== Teams ==
Teams of the 2022–23 Israeli Basketball Premier League

Maccabi Rishon LeZion has been relegated to 2022–23 National League after placing in the bottom place of the 2021–22 Premier League. Ironi Kiryat Ata has been promoted to the league after winning the 2021–22 National League.

=== Stadia and locations ===
Team	Home city	Stadium	Capacity
Bnei Herzliya	Herzliya	HaYovel Herzliya	1,500
Hapoel Be'er Sheva	Be'er Sheva	Conch Arena	3,000
Hapoel Eilat	Eilat	Begin Arena	1,200
Hapoel Galil Elyon	Upper Galilee and Kiryat Shmona	HaPais Kfar Blum	2,000
Hapoel Gilboa Galil	Gilboa Regional Council	Gan Ner Sports Hall	2,057
Hapoel Haifa	Haifa	Romema Arena	5,000
Hapoel Holon	Holon	Holon Toto Hall	5,500
Hapoel Jerusalem	Jerusalem	Pais Arena	11,000
Hapoel Tel Aviv	Tel Aviv	Drive in Arena	3,504
Ironi Kiryat Ata	Kiryat Ata	Ramaz Hall	1,200
Ironi Ness Ziona	Ness Ziona	Lev Hamoshava	1,300
Maccabi Tel Aviv	Tel Aviv	Menora Mivtachim Arena	10,383

=== Personnel and sponsorship ===
Team	Chairman	Head coach	Team captain	Kit manufacturer	Main sponsor
Bnei Herzliya	(Israel) Eldad Akunis	(Israel) Oren Aharoni	(Israel) Yair Kravitz	Peak	Ofek Dist
Hapoel Be'er Sheva	(Israel) Kfir Arazi	(Israel) Lior Lubin	(Israel) Neta Segal	Kempa	Altshuler Shacham
Hapoel Eilat	(Israel) Tal Pinhas	(Italy) Maurizio Buscaglia	(Israel) Netanel Artzi	Nike	Yossi Avrahami
Hapoel Galil Elyon	(Israel) Tamir Abrahams	(Israel) Barak Peleg	(Sweden) (Israel) Nimrod Levi	Macron	Nofar Energy
Hapoel Gilboa Galil		(Israel) Ariel Beit-Halahmy	(Israel) Amit Suss	Macron	Gevasol
Hapoel Haifa	(Israel) Yuval Rosman	(Israel) Mickey Gorka	(Israel) Ofek Avital	Reebok	B-Cure Laser
Hapoel Holon	(Israel) Eitan Lanciano	(Israel) Guy Goodes	(United States) Chris Johnson	Reebok	Atsmon PlayGrounds
Hapoel Jerusalem	(Israel) Eyal Chomski	(Serbia) Aleksandar Džikić	(Israel) Itay Segev	Givova	Bank Yahav
Hapoel Tel Aviv	(Israel) Rami Cohen	(Israel) Danny Franco	(Israel) Bar Timor	Reebok	Vegan Friendly
Ironi Kiryat Ata	(Israel) Naftali Ben Tov	(Israel) Sharon Avrahami	(Israel) Ido Davidi	Reebok	Tax:on
Ironi Ness Ziona	(Israel) Yaniv Mizrahi	(Israel) Elad Hasin	(Israel) Lior Carreira	Macron	Chai Motors
Maccabi Tel Aviv	(Israel) Shimon Mizrahi	(Israel) Oded Kattash	(United States) (Israel) John DiBartolomeo	Puma	Playtika

=== Managerial changes ===
Team	Outgoing manager	Manner of departure	Date of vacancy	Position in table	Replaced with	Date of appointment	Ref.
Hapoel Gilboa Galil	(Israel) Rami Hadar	Fired	21 December 2022	12th (2-8)	(Israel) Ariel Beit-Halahmy	9 January 2023	
Hapoel Eilat	(Israel) Ariel Beit-Halahmy	Resigned	25 December 2022	11th (3-8)	(Italy) Maurizio Buscaglia	15 January 2023	
Hapoel Haifa	(Israel) Sharon Drucker	Fired	11 April 2023	11th (6-17)	(Israel) Mickey Gorka	12 April 2023	

== Regular season ==
Pos	Team	Pld	W	L	PF	PA	PD	PCT	Qualification or relegation
1	Maccabi Tel Aviv	22	19	3	2035	1677	+358	.864	Advance to the Top-teams League Group
2	Hapoel Tel Aviv	22	18	4	1976	1828	+148	.818	Advance to the Top-teams League Group
3	Hapoel Jerusalem	22	15	7	1764	1623	+141	.682	Advance to the Top-teams League Group
4	Hapoel Holon	22	14	8	1907	1842	+65	.636	Advance to the Top-teams League Group
5	Hapoel Galil Elyon	22	11	11	1870	1929	−59	.500	Advance to the Top-teams League Group
6	Ironi Ness Ziona	22	11	11	1946	1948	−2	.500	Advance to the Top-teams League Group
7	Hapoel Be'er Sheva	22	10	12	1859	1912	−53	.455	Advance to the Bottom-Teams League Group
8	Bnei Herzliya	22	10	12	1838	1815	+23	.455	Advance to the Bottom-Teams League Group
9	Ironi Kiryat Ata	22	7	15	1805	1902	−97	.318	Advance to the Bottom-Teams League Group
10	Hapoel Eilat	22	7	15	1751	1937	−186	.318	Advance to the Bottom-Teams League Group
11	Hapoel Haifa	22	6	16	1732	1911	−179	.273	Advance to the Bottom-Teams League Group
12	Hapoel Gilboa Galil	22	4	18	1741	1900	−159	.182	Advance to the Bottom-Teams League Group

Rules for classification:

=== Rounds 1 to 22 ===
Home \ Away	MTA	HTA	HJE	HHO	HGE	INZ	HBS	BNH	IKA	HEI	HHA	HGG
Maccabi Tel Aviv		95–90	75–80	98–78	104–73	95–87	81–68	93–98	94–68	109–57	108–104	86–64
Hapoel Tel Aviv	96–95		68–80	87–93	108–80	102–85	95–83	105–87	90–84	98–59	87–77	86–81
Hapoel Jerusalem	74–88	77–80		91–73	89–70	78–62	84–74	84–82	77–70	82–68	85–82	69–60
Hapoel Holon	74–84	74–79	80–76		83–73	107–92	92–77	74–79	88–73	102–94	99–77	96–89
Hapoel Galil Elyon	67–96	84–89	89–83	86–66		79–82	90–84	95–89	92–86	72–79	79–86	89–78
Ironi Ness Ziona	84–91	97–102	96–87	81–101	104–108		87–75	91–84	93–70	87–73	93–80	104–90
Hapoel Be'er Sheva	58–91	79–80	70–61	94–101	86–90	97–92		89–73	100–99	105–101	92–96	103–89
Bnei Herzliya	76–99	110–82	83–66	77–64	68–87	96–92	75–77		77–66	81–86	85–87	82–70
Ironi Kiryat Ata	88–100	84–96	65–107	85–97	94–98	78–75	95–96	79–70		90–78	83–58	81–76
Hapoel Eilat	74–96	80–88	60–83	102–91	88–76	79–80	70–79	81–91	74–98		79–94	85–74
Hapoel Haifa	59–80	73–87	57–74	81–83	70–78	86–88	77–93	69–101	91–82	79–90		82–80
Hapoel Gilboa Galil	60–77	71–81	71–77	67–91	117–115	90–94	93–80	79–74	75–87	82–94	85–67	

Legend: Blue = home team win; Red = away team win.
Matches with lighter background shading were decided after overtime.

=== Positions by round ===
The table lists the positions of teams after completion of each round. In order to preserve chronological evolvements, any postponed matches are not included in the round at which they were originally scheduled, but added to the full round they were played immediately afterwards.

Team ╲ Round	1	2	3	4	5	6	7	8	9	10	11	12	13	14	15	16	17	18	19	20	21	22
Maccabi Tel Aviv	3	2	2	2	1	1	1	1	2	2	2	1	1	2	2	1	1	1	1	1	1	1
Hapoel Tel Aviv	1	1	1	1	2	2	2	2	1	1	1	2	2	1	1	2	2	2	2	2	2	2
Hapoel Jerusalem	8	11	11	7	5	4	3	3	4	4	6	5	5	5	4	4	4	4	4	3	3	3
Hapoel Holon	5	3	4	5	4	3	4	5	5	5	4	3	3	3	3	3	3	3	3	4	4	4
Hapoel Galil Elyon	7	7	7	9	7	10	10	10	7	7	9	8	7	6	5	5	5	5	5	5	5	5
Ironi Ness Ziona	10	8	5	3	3	5	5	4	3	3	3	4	4	4	6	7	6	7	7	6	6	6
Hapoel Be'er Sheva	9	10	8	10	10	12	6	7	8	8	7	9	8	7	7	6	7	6	6	7	7	7
Bnei Herzliya	11	6	3	6	9	7	12	12	11	10	8	7	6	9	9	8	8	8	8	8	8	8
Ironi Kiryat Ata	2	4	12	12	11	9	7	8	10	9	10	10	10	10	10	10	10	10	10	10	9	9
Hapoel Eilat	12	12	10	11	12	11	9	9	9	11	11	11	11	11	11	11	11	11	11	11	10	10
Hapoel Haifa	4	9	6	4	6	6	8	6	6	6	5	6	9	8	8	9	9	9	9	9	11	11
Hapoel Gilboa Galil	6	5	9	8	8	8	11	11	12	12	12	12	12	12	12	12	12	12	12	12	12	12

= Leader and advance to Top-teams League Group; = Advance to Top-teams League Group; = Advance to Bottom-teams League Group; = Last Place and Advance to Bottom-teams League Group

== Top-teams League Group ==
Pos	Team	Pld	W	L	PF	PA	PD	PCT	Qualification or relegation	MTA	HJE	HTA	HHO	HGE	INZ
1	Maccabi Tel Aviv	27	22	5	2467	2090	+377	.815	Advance to the playoffs			89–82	96–88	83–95	
2	Hapoel Jerusalem	27	20	7	2179	1994	+185	.741	Advance to the playoffs	83–76			75–66	90–78	
3	Hapoel Tel Aviv	27	20	7	2420	2277	+143	.741	Advance to the playoffs		76–85			88–84	103–91
4	Hapoel Holon	27	17	10	2354	2273	+81	.630	Advance to the playoffs			100–95			103–81
5	Hapoel Galil Elyon	27	13	14	2304	2365	−61	.481	Advance to the playoffs				84–90		94–85
6	Ironi Ness Ziona	27	11	16	2344	2418	−74	.407	Advance to the playoffs	66–88	75–82				

Rules for classification:

=== Positions by round ===
The table lists the positions of teams after completion of each round. In order to preserve chronological evolvements, any postponed matches are not included in the round at which they were originally scheduled, but added to the full round they were played immediately afterwards.

Team ╲ Round	22	23	24	25	26	27
Maccabi Tel Aviv	1	1	1	1	1	1
Hapoel Jerusalem	3	3	3	3	3	2
Hapoel Tel Aviv	2	2	2	2	2	3
Hapoel Holon	4	4	4	4	4	4
Hapoel Galil Elyon	5	6	5	5	5	5
Ironi Ness Ziona	6	5	6	6	6	6

= Leader and advance to playoffs; = Advance to the playoffs

== Bottom-Teams League Group ==
Pos	Team	Pld	W	L	PF	PA	PD	PCT	Qualification or relegation	BNH	HBS	HHA	IKA	HEI	HGG
7	Bnei Herzliya	27	14	13	2282	2210	+72	.519	Advance to the playoffs			95–72	93–89		84–60
8	Hapoel Be'er Sheva	27	13	14	2312	2352	−40	.481	Advance to the playoffs	75–86		102–98		102–94	
9	Hapoel Haifa	27	9	18	2196	2359	−163	.333						104–91	93–77
10	Ironi Kiryat Ata	27	9	18	2232	2362	−130	.333			77–96	83–97		85–83	
11	Hapoel Eilat	27	9	18	2210	2400	−190	.333		99–86					92–86
12	Hapoel Gilboa Galil	27	5	22	2140	2340	−200	.185	Relegation to Liga Leumit		85–78		91–93		

Rules for classification:

=== Positions by Round ===
Team ╲ Round	22	23	24	25	26	27
Bnei Herzliya	8	8	7	7	7	7
Hapoel Be'er Sheva	7	7	8	8	8	8
Hapoel Haifa	11	11	10	11	11	9
Ironi Kiryat Ata	9	9	9	9	9	10
Hapoel Eilat	10	10	11	10	10	11
Hapoel Gilboa Galil	12	12	12	12	12	12

= Advance to the playoffs; = Relegation to Liga Leumit

== Playoffs ==
Quarterfinals; 15–30 May 2023
1	Maccabi Tel Aviv	86	80	82	–	–	3
8	Hapoel Be'er Sheva	77	76	77	–	–	0
4	Hapoel Holon	106	96	97	–	–	3
5	Hapoel Galil Elyon	69	88	88	–	–	0
2	Hapoel Jerusalem	81	64	74	86	–	3
7	Bnei Herzliya	70	75	69	61	–	1
3	Hapoel Tel Aviv	90	106	102	–	–	3
6	Ironi Ness Ziona	77	75	69	–	–	0

Semifinals; 30 May–4 June 2023
1	Maccabi Tel Aviv	90	112	–	2
4	Hapoel Holon	76	85	–	0
2	Hapoel Jerusalem	55	68	–	0
3	Hapoel Tel Aviv	86	77	–	2

Finals; 8–14 June 2023
1	Maccabi Tel Aviv	90	74	94	2
3	Hapoel Tel Aviv	79	112	90	1

=== Quarterfinals ===
==== Game 1 ====
15 May 2023	Hapoel Holon	106–69 (Series: 1–0)	Hapoel Galil Elyon	Holon
20:30	Scoring by quarter: 22–20, 29–19, 27–13, 28–17
5 LIVE	Pts: Harris 20; Rebs: Dawson 8 Asts: Ragland 6 PIR: Harris 22	Boxscore	Pts: Marble 19; Rebs: Washington 8 Asts: Booker, Huber 4 PIR: Booker 23	Arena: Holon Toto Hall; Attendance: 3,200; Referees: David Romano, Adar Pe'er, Rotem Kuza

17 May 2023	Maccabi Tel Aviv	86–77 (Series: 1–0)	Hapoel Be'er Sheva	Tel Aviv
18:30	Scoring by quarter: 19–15, 24–19, 18–20, 25–23
5 Sport	Pts: Hilliard 17; Rebs: Sorkin 8 Asts: Brown 5 PIR: Poythress 18	Boxscore	Pts: Efianayi 23; Rebs: three players 5 Asts: Ahmad 5 PIR: Efianayi 19	Arena: Menora Mivtachim Arena; Attendance: 6,223; Referees: Ofer Manheim, Lior Beynish, Guy Shmueli

17 May 2023	Hapoel Tel Aviv	90–77 (Series: 1–0)	Ironi Ness Ziona	Tel Aviv
19:30	Scoring by quarter: 18–24, 17–23, 28–16, 27–14
5 STARS	Pts: Munford & Ginat 19; Rebs: Ginat 14; Asts: Brown 9 PIR: Onuaku 30	Boxscore	Pts: Bey 22; Rebs: Cooper 9 Asts: Cooper 9 PIR: Bey & Meyinsse 20	Arena: Drive in Arena; Attendance: 3,350; Referees: Amit Balak, Zahi Habdali, Noam Gordon

18 May 2023	Hapoel Jerusalem	81–70 (Series: 1–0)	Bnei Herzliya	Jerusalem
21:00	Scoring by quarter: 14–22, 28–14, 18–19, 21–15
5 Sport	Pts: Smith 20; Rebs: Hankins 7 Asts: Smith 5 PIR: Hankins 24	Boxscore	Pts: Babb 23; Rebs: Kemp 11; Asts: Brandwein 5 PIR: Babb & Kemp 26	Arena: Pais Arena; Attendance: 5,217; Referees: Sefi Shemesh, Nir Meirson, Harel Kidron

==== Game 2 ====
18 May 2023	Hapoel Galil Elyon	88–96 (Series: 0–2)	Hapoel Holon	Kfar Blum
19:00	Scoring by quarter: 30–25, 20–19, 13–26, 25–26
5 LIVE	Pts: Booker 21; Rebs: Washington 12; Asts: Huber 7 PIR: Booker 29	Boxscore	Pts: Dawson 27; Rebs: Dawson 9 Asts: Ragland 9 PIR: Dawson 36	Arena: HaPais Kfar Blum; Attendance: 1,000; Referees: Amit Balak, Kfir Mualem, Or Zrur

21 May 2023	Hapoel Be'er Sheva	76–80 (Series: 0–2)	Maccabi Tel Aviv	Be'er Sheva
17:30	Scoring by quarter: 14–25, 24–13, 23–21, 15–21
5 Sport	Pts: Moore 17; Rebs: Moore 7 Asts: Ahmad 6 PIR: Moore 22	Boxscore	Pts: Brown 21; Rebs: Poythress 9 Asts: Brown 4 PIR: Brown 28	Arena: Conch Arena; Attendance: 2,100; Referees: Dan Yalon, Nir Meirson, Ori Shalhavi

20 May 2023	Ironi Ness Ziona	75–106 (Series: 0–2)	Hapoel Tel Aviv	Ness Ziona
20:45	Scoring by quarter: 13–26, 20–24, 23–19, 19–37
5 PLUS	Pts: Bey 23; Rebs: Bey 14; Asts: Cooper 12; PIR: Bey 21	Boxscore	Pts: Munford 30; Rebs: Ginat 12; Asts: Brown 9 PIR: Ginat 35	Arena: Lev Hamoshava; Attendance: 1,300; Referees: Ofer Manheim, Kfir Mualem, Adar Pe'er

21 May 2023	Bnei Herzliya	75–64 (Series: 1–1)	Hapoel Jerusalem	Herzliya
19:35	Scoring by quarter: 18–10, 24–16, 15–20, 18–18
5 PLUS	Pts: Kravitz 14; Rebs: Kemp 8 Asts: Kravitz 5 PIR: Carter 19	Boxscore	Pts: Smith 17; Rebs: Hankins 14; Asts: Smith 4 PIR: Smith & Hankins 17	Arena: HaYovel Herzliya; Attendance: 1,250; Referees: Erez Gurion, Zahi Habdali, Noam Gordon

==== Game 3 ====
22 May 2023	Hapoel Holon	97–88 (Series: Hapoel Holon won 3–0)	Hapoel Galil Elyon	Holon
20:40	Scoring by quarter: 21–23, 28–21, 21–22, 27–22
5 Sport	Pts: Ragland 31; Rebs: Dalton 8 Asts: Ragland 11; PIR: Ragland 46	Boxscore	Pts: Booker 21; Rebs: Washington 11; Asts: Booker & Huber 7 PIR: Washington 24	Arena: Holon Toto Hall; Attendance: 3,350; Referees: Ofer Manheim, Dan Yalon, Lior Beynish

24 May 2023	Maccabi Tel Aviv	82–77 (Series: Maccabi Tel Aviv won 3–0)	Hapoel Be'er Sheva	Tel Aviv
18:00	Scoring by quarter: 26–22, 18–20, 12–22, 26–13
5 Sport	Pts: Brown 14; Rebs: Poythress 9 Asts: Brown 7 PIR: Poythress 22	Boxscore	Pts: Efianayi 20; Rebs: Whittington 12; Asts: Efianayi 8 PIR: Efianayi 25	Arena: Menora Mivtachim Arena; Attendance: 7,534; Referees: Erez Gurion, Zahi Habdali, Harel Kidron

23 May 2023	Hapoel Tel Aviv	102–69 (Series: Hapoel Tel Aviv won 3–0)	Ironi Ness Ziona	Tel Aviv
19:00	Scoring by quarter: 31–15, 25–17, 25–18, 21–19
5 LIVE	Pts: Ginat 16; Rebs: Onuaku 8 Asts: Brown 9 PIR: Onuaku 25	Boxscore	Pts: Bey 16; Rebs: Levinson 8 Asts: Rozenfeld 7 PIR: Bey 19	Arena: Drive in Arena; Attendance: 3,300; Referees: Sefi Shemesh, Noam Gordon, Rotem Kuza

24 May 2023	Hapoel Jerusalem	74–69 (Series: 2–1)	Bnei Herzliya	Jerusalem
21:00	Scoring by quarter: 16–22, 18–10, 14–19, 26–18
5 Sport	Pts: Randolph 18; Rebs: Hankins 15; Asts: Smith 4 PIR: Hankins 30	Boxscore	Pts: Kemp 21; Rebs: Kemp 13; Asts: Four players 2 PIR: Kemp 33	Arena: Pais Arena; Attendance: 6,271; Referees: Amit Balak, Adar Pe'er, Or Zrur

==== Game 4 ====
28 May 2023	Bnei Herzliya	61–86 (Series: Hapoel Jerusalem won 1–3)	Hapoel Jerusalem	Herzliya
20:45	Scoring by quarter: 11–29, 18–20, 28–11, 4–26
5 Sport	Pts: Babb 26; Rebs: Gamble 7 Asts: Kravitz 4 PIR: Babb 24	Boxscore	Pts: Carrington 26; Rebs: Hankins 12; Asts: Cline & Smith 3 PIR: Carrington 25	Arena: HaYovel Herzliya; Attendance: 1,250; Referees: Sefi Shemesh, Omer Esteron, Dan Yalon

=== Semifinals ===
==== Game 1 ====
30 May 2023	Maccabi Tel Aviv	90–76 (Series: 1–0)	Hapoel Holon	Tel Aviv
21:00	Scoring by quarter: 21–25, 28–18, 23–21, 18–12
5 Sport	Pts: Baldwin 20; Rebs: Colson 12; Asts: Brown 11; PIR: Colson 21	Boxscore	Pts: Ragland 28; Rebs: Ragland 9 Asts: Ragland 6 PIR: Ragland 36	Arena: Menora Mivtachim Arena; Attendance: 7,623; Referees: Sefi Shemesh, Ofer Manheim, Nir Meirson

31 May 2023	Hapoel Jerusalem	55–86 (Series: 0–1)	Hapoel Tel Aviv	Jerusalem
21:00	Scoring by quarter: 8–16, 15–24, 15–24, 17–22
5 Sport	Pts: Smith 18; Rebs: Hankins 9 Asts: Smith 3 PIR: Hankins 19	Boxscore	Pts: McRae 20; Rebs: Three players 5 Asts: Brown 5 PIR: McRae 24	Arena: Pais Arena; Attendance: 8,431; Referees: Omer Esteron, Amit Balak, Zahi Habdali

==== Game 2 ====
2 June 2023	Hapoel Holon	85–112 (Series: Maccabi Tel Aviv won 2–0)	Maccabi Tel Aviv	Holon
15:30	Scoring by quarter: 19–33, 19–21, 24–28, 23–30
5 Sport	Pts: Johnson 17; Rebs: Dalton 8 Asts: Ragland 9 PIR: Ragland 21	Boxscore	Pts: Colson 23; Rebs: Four players 4 Asts: Baldwin IV 10; PIR: Colson 24	Arena: Holon Toto Hall; Attendance: 5,500; Referees: Amit Balak, David Romano, Dan Yalon

3 June 2023	Hapoel Tel Aviv	77–68 (Series: 2–0)	Hapoel Jerusalem	Tel Aviv
21:00	Scoring by quarter: 21–16, 17–16, 19–23, 20–13
5 Sport	Pts: Brown 29; Rebs: Onuaku 12; Asts: Onuaku 5 PIR: Brown 28	Boxscore	Pts: Blayzer 22; Rebs: Blayzer 10; Asts: Three players 4 PIR: Hankins 25	Arena: Drive in Arena; Attendance: 3,536; Referees: Sefi Shemesh, Adar Pe'er, Noam Gordon

=== Finals ===
8 June 2023 Game 1	Maccabi Tel Aviv	90–79 (Series: 1–0)	Hapoel Tel Aviv	Tel Aviv
21:00	Scoring by quarter: 25–22, 18–16, 24–18, 23–23
5 Sport	Pts: Baldwin 14; Rebs: Sorkin 7 Asts: Baldwin 9 PIR: Brown 22	Boxscore	Pts: McRae 18; Rebs: Onuaku 6 Asts: Brown 8 PIR: Onuaku 18	Arena: Menora Mivtachim Arena; Attendance: 10,650; Referees: Omer Esteron, Ofer Manheim, Zahi Habdali

11 June 2023 Game 2	Hapoel Tel Aviv	112–74 (Series: 1–1)	Maccabi Tel Aviv	Tel Aviv
21:00	Scoring by quarter: 36–17, 23–25, 27–23, 26–9
5 Sport	Pts: Munford 26; Rebs: Onuaku 10; Asts: Brown 9 PIR: McRae 23	Boxscore	Pts: Baldwin 18; Rebs: Poythress 7 Asts: Brown 7 PIR: Baldwin 18	Arena: Drive in Arena; Attendance: 3,536; Referees: Sefi Shemesh, Amit Balak, Adar Pe'er

13 June 2023 Game 3	Maccabi Tel Aviv	94–90 (Series: 2–1)	Hapoel Tel Aviv	Tel Aviv
21:00	Scoring by quarter: 26–23, 16–15, 33–26, 19–26
5 Sport	Pts: Brown & Baldwin 22; Rebs: Sorkin & Colson 9 Asts: Baldwin 8 PIR: Brown 25	Boxscore	Pts: Brown 31; Rebs: Onuaku 10; Asts: Brown 8 PIR: Brown 29	Arena: Menora Mivtachim Arena; Attendance: 10,500; Referees: Sefi Shemesh, Omer Esteron, Amit Balak

2022–23 Israeli Premier League champions
Maccabi Tel Aviv
56th title

== Awards ==
=== MVP of the Round ===
Round	Player	Team	EFF	Ref.
October
1	Payton Willis	Hapoel Gilboa Galil	35	
2	D. J. Cooper (1/2)	Ironi Ness Ziona	29	
4	Anthony Hickey	Hapoel Haifa	27	
November
5	D. J. Cooper (2/2)	Ironi Ness Ziona	34	
6	Speedy Smith	Hapoel Jerusalem	29	
December
8	Shaq Buchanan (1/2)	Ironi Ness Ziona	32	
8	Tyler Bey (1/2)	Ironi Ness Ziona	36	
9	Maurice Kemp	Bnei Herzliya	39	
11	David Efianayi (1/2)	Hapoel Be'er Sheva	35	
January
13	Itay Moskovich	Hapoel Galil Elyon	30	
14	J'Covan Brown (1/2)	Hapoel Tel Aviv	39	
15	David Efianayi (2/2)	Hapoel Be'er Sheva	31	
February
17	Nimrod Levi	Hapoel Galil Elyon	29	
March
18	Joe Ragland	Hapoel Holon	37	
19	Tony Carr	Hapoel Gilboa Galil	42	
21	J'Covan Brown (2/2)	Hapoel Tel Aviv	34	
April
25	Hayden Dalton	Hapoel Holon	35	
May
27	Tomer Ginat	Hapoel Tel Aviv	32	
–
3	Jordan McRae (1/2)	Hapoel Tel Aviv	26	
7	Shaq Buchanan (2/2)	Ironi Ness Ziona	33	
10	Andy Van Vliet	Bnei Herzliya	31	
12	Roi Huber (1/2)	Hapoel Galil Elyon	24	
16	Roi Huber (2/2)	Hapoel Galil Elyon	33	
20	Mangok Mathiang	Hapoel Eilat	44	
22	Tyler Bey (2/2)	Ironi Ness Ziona	36	
23	Jordan McRae (2/2)	Hapoel Tel Aviv	30	
24	Roman Sorkin	Maccabi Tel Aviv	32	
26	Zach Hankins	Hapoel Jerusalem	31	

=== Monthly Awards ===
==== Player of the Month ====
Month	Player	Team	EFF	Ref.
October	(United States) Tyler Bey	Ironi Ness Ziona	30.0	
November	(United States) D. J. Cooper	Ironi Ness Ziona	31.0	
December	(United States) Maurice Kemp (1/2)	Bnei Herzliya	24.8	
January	(United States) (Nigeria) David Efianayi	Hapoel Be'er Sheva	23.8	
February	(United States) Antonius Cleveland	Hapoel Eilat	22	
March	(United States) Antonius Cleveland	Hapoel Eilat	22	
April	(United States) Maurice Kemp (2/2)	Bnei Herzliya	27.0	

==== Israeli Player of the Month ====
Month	Player	Team	EFF	Ref.
October	(Israel) Roman Sorkin (1/2)	Maccabi Tel Aviv	24.3	
November	(Israel) Tomer Ginat	Hapoel Tel Aviv	14.0	
December	(Israel) Itay Moskovich	Hapoel Galil Elyon	16.8	
January	(Israel) Roi Huber	Hapoel Galil Elyon	19.5	
February	(Israel) Roman Sorkin (2/2)	Maccabi Tel Aviv	18.3	
March	(Israel) Roman Sorkin (2/2)	Maccabi Tel Aviv	18.3	
April	(Israel) Egor Koulechov	Hapoel Be'er Sheva	15.5	

==== Coach of the Month ====
Month	Coach	Team	W-L	Ref.
October	(Israel) Oded Kattash	Maccabi Tel Aviv	3–0	
November	(Serbia) Aleksandar Džikić (1/2)	Hapoel Jerusalem	3–0	
December	(Israel) Oren Aharoni (1/2)	Bnei Herzliya	3–1	
January	(Israel) Barak Peleg	Hapoel Galil Elyon	4–0	
February	(Serbia) Aleksandar Džikić (2/2)	Hapoel Jerusalem	6–0	
March	(Serbia) Aleksandar Džikić (2/2)	Hapoel Jerusalem	6–0	
April	(Israel) Oren Aharoni (2/2)	Bnei Herzliya	4–0	

=== Yearly awards ===
Award	Winner	Team	Ref.
Regular season MVP	(United States) Zach Hankins	Hapoel Jerusalem	
Regular season Israeli MVP	(Israel) Tomer Ginat	Hapoel Tel Aviv	
Rising Star	(Israel) Roy Paretsky	Hapoel Be'er Sheva	
Best Defender	(Israel) Or Cornelius	Hapoel Jerusalem	
Most Improved Player	(Israel) Itay Moskovich	Hapoel Galil Elyon	
Sixth Man of the Year	(Israel) Bar Timor	Hapoel Tel Aviv	
First Team	(United States) D. J. Cooper	Ironi Ness Ziona	
First Team	(United States) Joe Ragland	Hapoel Holon	
First Team	(Israel) Tomer Ginat	Hapoel Tel Aviv	
First Team	(Israel) Roman Sorkin	Maccabi Tel Aviv	
First Team	(United States) Zach Hankins	Hapoel Jerusalem	
Second Team	(United States) Wade Baldwin	Maccabi Tel Aviv	
Second Team	(United States) Khadeen Carrington	Hapoel Jerusalem	
Second Team	(United States) Jordan McRae	Hapoel Tel Aviv	
Second Team	(Israel) Nimrod Levi	Hapoel Galil Elyon	
Second Team	(United States) Maurice Kemp	Bnei Herzliya	
Coach of the Year	(Serbia) Aleksandar Džikić	Hapoel Jerusalem	
Finals MVP	(United States) Wade Baldwin	Maccabi Tel Aviv	

== Israeli clubs in European competitions ==
European-wide competitions
Competition	Team	Progress
EuroLeague	Maccabi Tel Aviv	Quarter-finals
Champions League	Hapoel Jerusalem	Runner-up
Champions League	Bnei Herzliya	Regular season
Champions League	Hapoel Holon	Round of 16
EuroCup	Hapoel Tel Aviv	Quarter-finals
FIBA Europe Cup	Hapoel Galil Elyon	Regular season
FIBA Europe Cup	Hapoel Haifa	Second round

Regional leagues
Competition	Team	Progress
European North Basketball League	Ironi Ness Ziona	Quarter-finals
Balkan League	Hapoel Be'er Sheva	Champion
