= Israeli Basketball Premier League Sixth Man of the Year =

The Israeli Basketball Premier League 6th Man of the Year, or Israeli Basketball Super League 6th Man of the Year, is an award given to the best 6th man of each season of the Israeli Basketball Premier League, which is the top-tier level men's professional basketball league in Israel.

== Winners ==
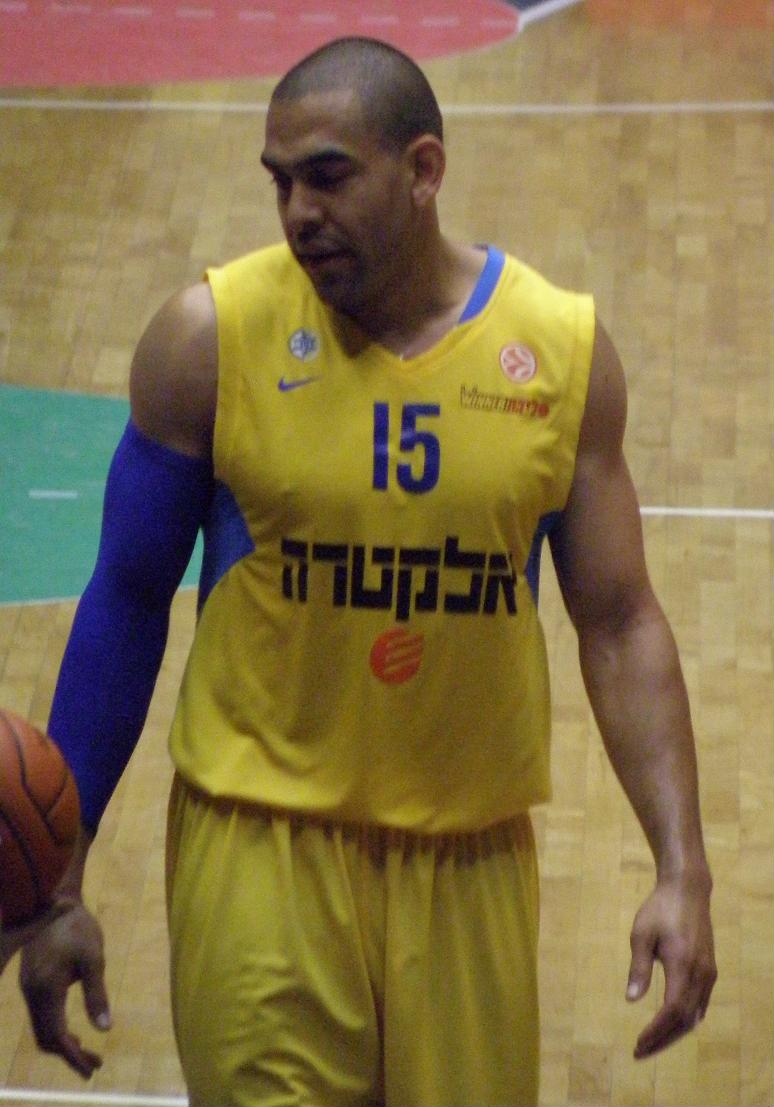
David Blu

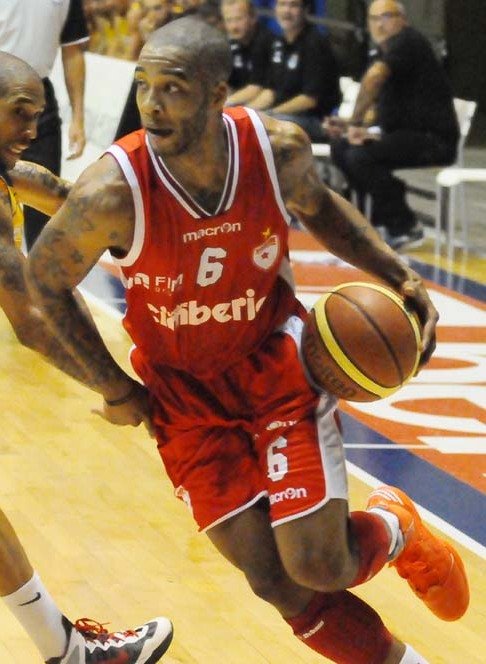
Adrian Banks

Season	6th Man of the Year	Team
2003–04	(Israel) Dror Hajaj	Hapoel Tel Aviv
2004–05	(Israel) Moshe Brener	Elitzur Givat Shmuel
2005–06	Not awarded	
2006–07	Not awarded	
2007–08	(Israel) Omri Casspi	Maccabi Tel Aviv
2008–09	(United States) Davon Jefferson	Maccabi Haifa
2009–10	(United States) Pooh Jeter	Hapoel Jerusalem
2010–11	(Israel) Yuval Naimy	Hapoel Jerusalem
2011–12	(United States) (Israel) Alex Tyus	Maccabi Ashdod
2012–13	(Israel) Yehu Orland	Barak Netanya
2013–14	(United States) (Israel) David Blu	Maccabi Tel Aviv
2014–15	(United States) Tony Gaffney	Hapoel Jerusalem
2015–16	(Israel) Bar Timor	Hapoel Jerusalem
2016–17	(United States) Jason Siggers	Hapoel Gilboa Galil
2017–18	(United States) (Israel) Adrian Banks	Hapoel Tel Aviv
2018–19	(Nigeria) (United States) Suleiman Braimoh	Hapoel Eilat
2019–20	(Nigeria) (United States) Suleiman Braimoh (2×)	Hapoel Jerusalem
2020–21	(Israel) Guy Pnini	Hapoel Holon
2021–22	(United States) Jalen Adams	Hapoel Jerusalem
2022–23	(Israel) Bar Timor	Hapoel Tel Aviv
2023–24	(United States) (Israel) Jordan Cohen	Maccabi Ironi Ramat Gan
2024–25	(Israel) Roi Huber	Maccabi Ironi Ramat Gan / Hapoel Jerusalem
2025–26	(United States) Justin Smith	Hapoel Jerusalem
