= Dror Hagag =

Israeli basketball player

Dror Hagag 'דרור חג'ג
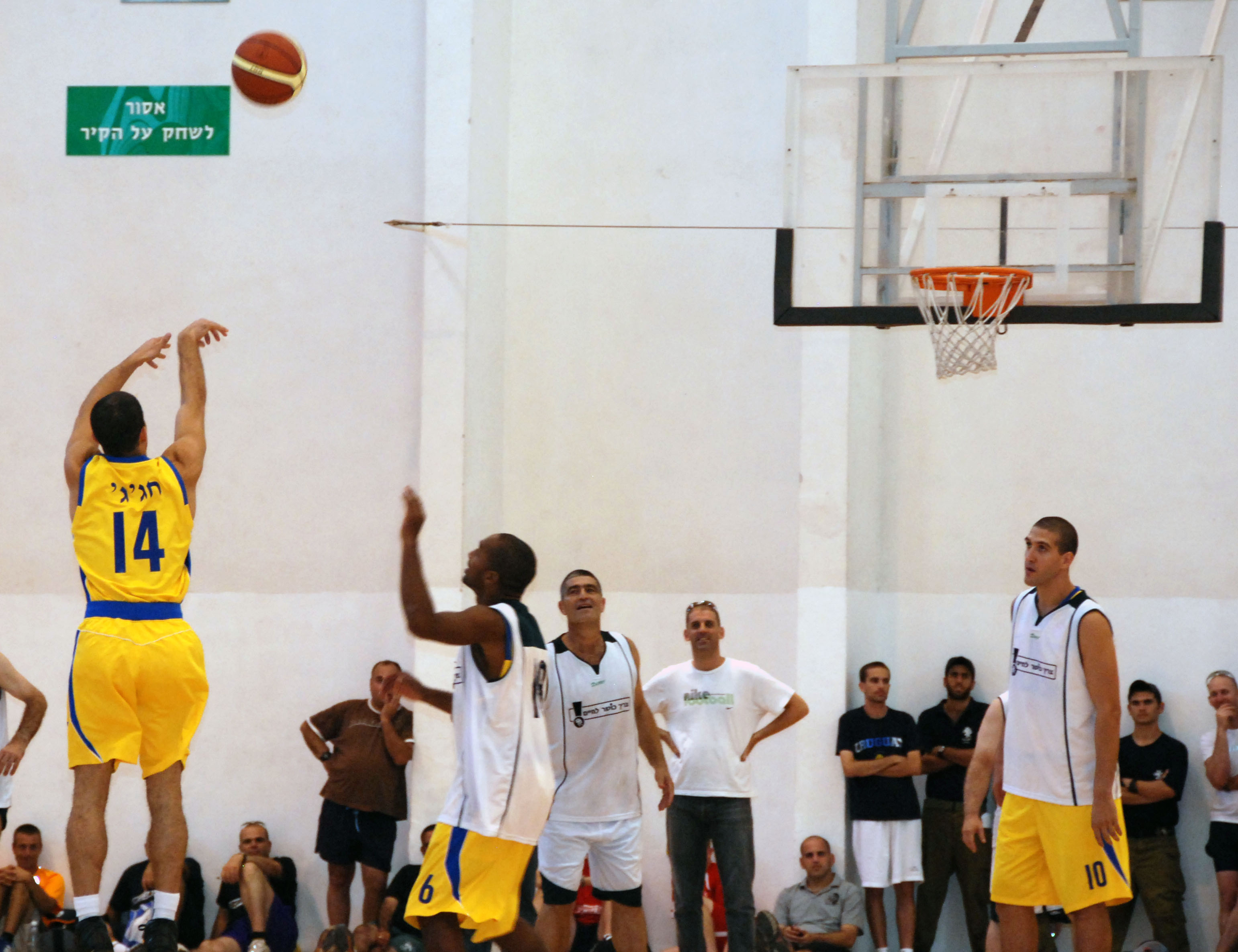
- Dror Hagag (left), playing with Maccabi Tel Aviv, during the 2008 IDF Officers Championship. From left to right: Hagag, Derrick Sharp, Tal Russo, and Tal Burstein.

Personal information
- Born: 31 December 1978 (age 47) Be'er Ya'akov, Israel
- Listed height: 5 ft 11 in (1.80 m)
- Listed weight: 165 lb (75 kg)

Career information
- Playing career: 1996–2015
- Position: Point guard

Career history
- 1996–1997: Maccabi Rishon LeZion
- 1997–1998: Hapoel Bat Yam
- 1998–2001: Maccabi Giv'at Shmuel
- 2001–2004: Hapoel Tel Aviv
- 2004–2005: Passe-Partout Leuven
- 2005–2006: AEK Athens
- 2006: Miami Heat
- 2006–2008: Hapoel Jerusalem
- 2008–2009: Maccabi Tel Aviv
- 2009–2010: Maccabi Haifa
- 2010–2011: Elitzur Ashkelon
- 2011–2013: Maccabi Ashdod
- 2013–2014: Maccabi Rishon LeZion
- 2014–2015: Maccabi Ashdod

Career highlights
- FIBA EuroStar (2007); Israeli Super League champion (2009); 2× Israeli Cup winner (2007, 2008); Israeli Super League 6th Man of the Year (2004); Belgian Cup winner (2005)

Dror Hagag (Hebrew: דרור חג'ג', alternate spelling: Hajaj, born December 31, 1978) is an Israeli former professional basketball player of Tunisian-Jewish descent. He played at the point guard position. He also played for the senior Israeli National Team.

== Professional career ==
Hagag was the Israeli Super League's 6th Man of the Year in 2004, and a FIBA EuroStar in 2007. In 2008, Hagag signed a two-year contract with the Israeli EuroLeague club Maccabi Tel Aviv. On 12 August 2009, he was released from his Maccabi Tel Aviv contract, and he signed with the then-Israeli Super League runner-ups Maccabi Haifa. Hagag finished his professional career with the Israeli club Maccabi Ashdod.

== National team career ==
Hagag was a member of the senior men's Israeli national team. He played with Israel at the 2005 EuroBasket and the 2007 EuroBasket.
