= Moshe Brener =

Israeli basketball player

Moshe Brener משה ברנר
Personal information
- Born: March 4, 1971 (age 55)
- Listed height: 6 ft 7 in (2.01 m)
- Position: Forward

Career highlights
- Israeli League Sixth Man of the Year (2005)

Moshe Brener (Hebrew: משה ברנר; born March 4, 1971) is an Israeli former professional basketball player. He played the forward position. He was the 2005 Israeli Basketball Premier League Sixth Man of the Year.

== Biography ==
Brener is 6 ft 7 in (201 cm) tall. He played for Maccabi Hadera from 1991 to 1993, for Rishon Lezion from 1993 to 1997, for Giv'at Shmuel from 1998 to 1999 and from 2000 to 2009, and for Maccabi Haifa from 1999 to 2000, and for Hapoel Jat in 2016–17. In 390 career games in the Israeli Premier League, ninth-most in league history, Brener scored 3,067 points. He was the 2005 Israeli Basketball Premier League Sixth Man of the Year.
