= 2012–13 Israeli Basketball Super League =

2012–2013 Ligat Loto^{1}
- Season: 2012–13
- Duration: 14 October 2012 – 13 June 2013
- Games played: 162 (total)
- Teams: 12

Regular season
- Season MVP: (Israel) Gal Mekel
- Relegated: Ironi Ashkelon

Finals
- Champions: Maccabi Haifa (1st title)
- Runners-up: Maccabi Tel Aviv
- Finals MVP: (Greece) Pat Calathes

Statistical leaders
Points	(United States) Jerome Dyson	20.4
Rebounds	(United States) Frank Hassell	14.2
Assists	(United States) Dominic Waters	7.3
Index Rating	(United States) Frank Hassell	25.4
- ^1 Sponsored league name, referring to Loto.

The 2012–2013 Israeli Basketball Super League, for sponsorship reasons known as Ligat Loto, was the 59th season of the Israeli Basketball Super League. The season began on 14 October 2012, and ended on 13 June 2013.

Maccabi Haifa won its first-ever Israeli championship.

== Teams ==
=== Team changes ===
Teams 2012-13

No team has Relegated as there was no relegation spot in last season.

Hapoel Tel Aviv been promoted to the league after winning Ligat Leumit last season. Another new team is Hapoel Eilat as the owner of Habik'a B.C. moved his license to the city of Eilat.

=== Stadia and locations ===
Team	Home city	Stadium	Capacity	Last season
Barak Netanya	Netanya	Yeshurun	1,000	9th
Bnei HaSharon/Herzliya	Herzliya	HaYovel Herzliya	1,750	10th
Hapoel Gilboa Galil	Gilboa Regional Council	Gan Ner Sports Hall	2,400	2nd
Hapoel Holon	Holon	Holon City Arena	2,850	5th
Hapoel Jerusalem	Jerusalem	Malha Arena	3,000	4th
Ironi Ashkelon	Ashkelon	Ashkelon Sports Arena	3,000	6th
Maccabi Ashdod	Ashdod	HaKiriya Arena	1,260	7th
Hapoel Eilat	Eilat	Begin Arena	1,100	8th (as Habik'a B.C.)
Maccabi Haifa	Haifa	Romema Arena	5,000	11th
Maccabi Rishon LeZion	Rishon LeZion	Beit Maccabi Rishon	2,500	3rd
Maccabi Tel Aviv	Tel Aviv	Nokia Arena	10,383	1st
Hapoel Tel Aviv	Tel Aviv	Beit Maccabi Rishon	2,500	1st (Liga Leumit)

=== Head coaches ===
Team	Head coach	Seasons as head coach
Barak Netanya	Danny Franco	2
Bnei Herzliya	Matan Harush	1
Hapoel Gilboa Galil	Lior Lubin	3
Hapoel Holon	Dan Shamir	2
Hapoel Jerusalem	Sharon Drucker	4
Ironi Ashkelon	Ariel Beit-Halahmy	6
Maccabi Ashdod	Ofer Berkovich	3
Hapoel Eilat	Oded Kattash	1
Maccabi Haifa	Brad Greenberg	1
Maccabi Rishon LeZion	Roni Bussani	5
Maccabi Tel Aviv	David Blatt	5
Hapoel Tel Aviv	Erez Edelstein	3

== Regular season ==
	Team	Pld	W	L	PF	PA	Diff	Pts	Playoff
1.	Maccabi Tel Aviv	27	22	5	2279	1917	+362	49	Upper Playoffs
2.	Maccabi Haifa	27	17	10	2224	2150	+74	44	Upper Playoffs
3.	Hapoel Eilat	27	17	10	2160	2059	+101	44	Upper Playoffs
4.	Barak Netanya	27	15	12	2095	2065	+30	42	Upper Playoffs
5.	Hapoel Jerusalem	27	13	14	2226	2204	+22	40	Upper Playoffs
6.	Maccabi Rishon LeZion	27	12	15	2112	2145	-33	39	Upper Playoffs
7.	Hapoel Gilboa Galil	27	14	13	2125	2137	-12	41	Lower Playoffs
8.	Hapoel Tel Aviv	27	13	14	1981	2027	-46	40	Lower Playoffs
9.	Hapoel Holon	27	12	15	2127	2144	-17	39	Lower Playoffs
10.	Maccabi Ashdod	27	11	16	2202	2300	-98	38	Lower Playoffs
11.	Bnei Herzliya	27	10	17	2210	2356	-146	37	Lower Playoffs
12.	Ironi Ashkelon	27	6	21	2094	2331	-237	33	Lower Playoffs

Qualification to Upper Playoffs
Qualification to Quarterfinals
Relegation to the Second Division

Pld – Played; W – Won; L – Lost; PF – Points for; PA – Points against; Diff – Difference; Pts – Points.

== Quarterfinals ==
The Quarterfinals were played as The-Best-Of-5 series. The higher ranked team hosted games 1, 3 and 5 (if necessary). The lower ranked team hosted games 2 and 4 (if necessary).

Team #1	Agg.	Team #2	Game 1 8–9 May	Game 2 12–13 May	Game 3 16 May	Game 4 19–20 May	Game 5 23 May
Maccabi Tel Aviv (1)	3–0	(8) Hapoel Tel Aviv	76-68	80-67	76-74		
Maccabi Haifa (2)	3–0	(7) Hapoel Gilboa Galil	87-85	93-81	93-87		
Hapoel Eilat (3)	3–2	(6) Maccabi Rishon LeZion	77-79	91-63	69-67	70-79	91-80
Barak Netanya (4)	2–3	(5) Hapoel Jerusalem	80-87	68-87	92-69	73-70	68-79

== Semifinals ==
The Semifinals were played as The-Best-Of-5 series. The higher ranked team hosted games 1, 3 and 5 (if necessary). The lower ranked team hosted games 2 and 4 (if necessary).

Team #1	Agg.	Team #2	Game 1 26–27 May	Game 2 29–30 May	Game 3 2–3 June	Game 4 5 June	Game 5 9 June
Maccabi Tel Aviv (1)	3–0	(5) Hapoel Jerusalem	91-73	74-68	78-72		
Maccabi Haifa (2)	3–2	(3) Hapoel Eilat	87-75	105-84	75-78 (OT)	72-82	71-68

== Final ==
The Final was held on 13 June at Romema Arena.

Team #1	Score	Team #2
Maccabi Tel Aviv (1)	79-86	(2) Maccabi Haifa

== Individual statistics ==
=== Rating ===
Rank	Name	Team	Games	PIR
1.	(United States) Frank Hassell	Hapoel Holon	26	25.4
2.	(United States) Diamon Simpson	Maccabi Ashdod	27	22.50
3.	(United States) Julian Wright	Maccabi Rishon LeZion	27	21.1

=== Points ===
Rank	Name	Team	Games	PPG
1.	(United States) Jerome Dyson	Hapoel Holon	27	20.4
2.	(Mexico) Romel Beck	Bnei HaSharon/Herzliya	26	18.9
3.	(United States) Scotty Hopson	Hapoel Eilat	24	18.6

=== Rebounds ===
Rank	Name	Team	Games	RPG
1.	(United States) Frank Hassell	Hapoel Holon	26	14.2
2.	(United States) Jumaine Jones	Bnei HaSharon/Herzliya	27	10
—.	(United States) Eli Holman	Hapoel Eilat	26	10

=== Assists ===
Rank	Name	Team	Games	APG
1.	(United States) Dominic Waters	Hapoel Holon	16	7.3
2.	(United States) (Mexico) Paul Stoll	Maccabi Haifa	26	5.4
3.	(Venezuela) Donta Smith	Maccabi Haifa	26	5.2

== All-Star Game ==
The 2013 Israeli League All-star event was held on March 18, 2013, at the Romema Arena, Haifa.

Israeli All-Stars
Pos	Player	Team
Starters
G	(Israel) Meir Tapiro	Hapoel Jerusalem
G	(Israel) Afik Nissim	Hapoel Eilat
F	(Israel) Matan Naor	Hapoel Tel Aviv
F	(Israel) Lior Eliyahu	Maccabi Tel Aviv
C	(Israel) Ido Kozikaro	Maccabi Haifa
Reserves
G	(Israel) Gal Mekel	Maccabi Haifa
G	(Israel) Nitzan Hanochi	Maccabi Rishon LeZion
G	(Israel) Dagan Yivzori	Hapoel Gilboa Galil
G	(Israel) Shlomi Harush	Hapoel Holon
G	(Israel) Ben Reis	Bnei Herzliya
G	(Israel) Oded Shashoua	Ironi Ashkelon
G	(Israel) Yehu Orland	Barak Netanya
F	(Israel) Guy Pnini	Maccabi Tel Aviv
Head coach: (Israel) Oded Kattash (Hapoel Eilat)

International All-Stars
Pos	Player	Team
Starters
G	(Mexico) Paul Stoll	Maccabi Haifa
G	(United States) Jamar Smith	Hapoel Gilboa Galil
F	(United States) Scotty Hopson	Hapoel Eilat
F	(Venezuela) Donta Smith	Maccabi Haifa
C	(United States) Shawn James	Maccabi Tel Aviv
Reserves
G	(United States) Demontez Stitt	Hapoel Tel Aviv
G	(United States) Jerome Dyson	Hapoel Holon
F	(United States) Deron Washington	Barak Netanya
F	(Greece) Pat Calathes	Maccabi Haifa
C	(Jamaica) Adrian Uter	Maccabi Rishon LeZion
C	(United States) Marcus Dove	Ironi Ashkelon
Head coach: (United States) Brad Greenberg (Maccabi Haifa)

March 18, 2013

Report

Israeli All-Stars	127–111	International All-Stars
Pts: Eliyahu & Yivzori 20; Rebs: Kozikaro 9 Asts: Eliyahu 6		Pts: Washington & Hopson 16; Rebs: Calathes 9

Romema Arena, Haifa
Attendance: 2,500

=== Three-point shootout ===
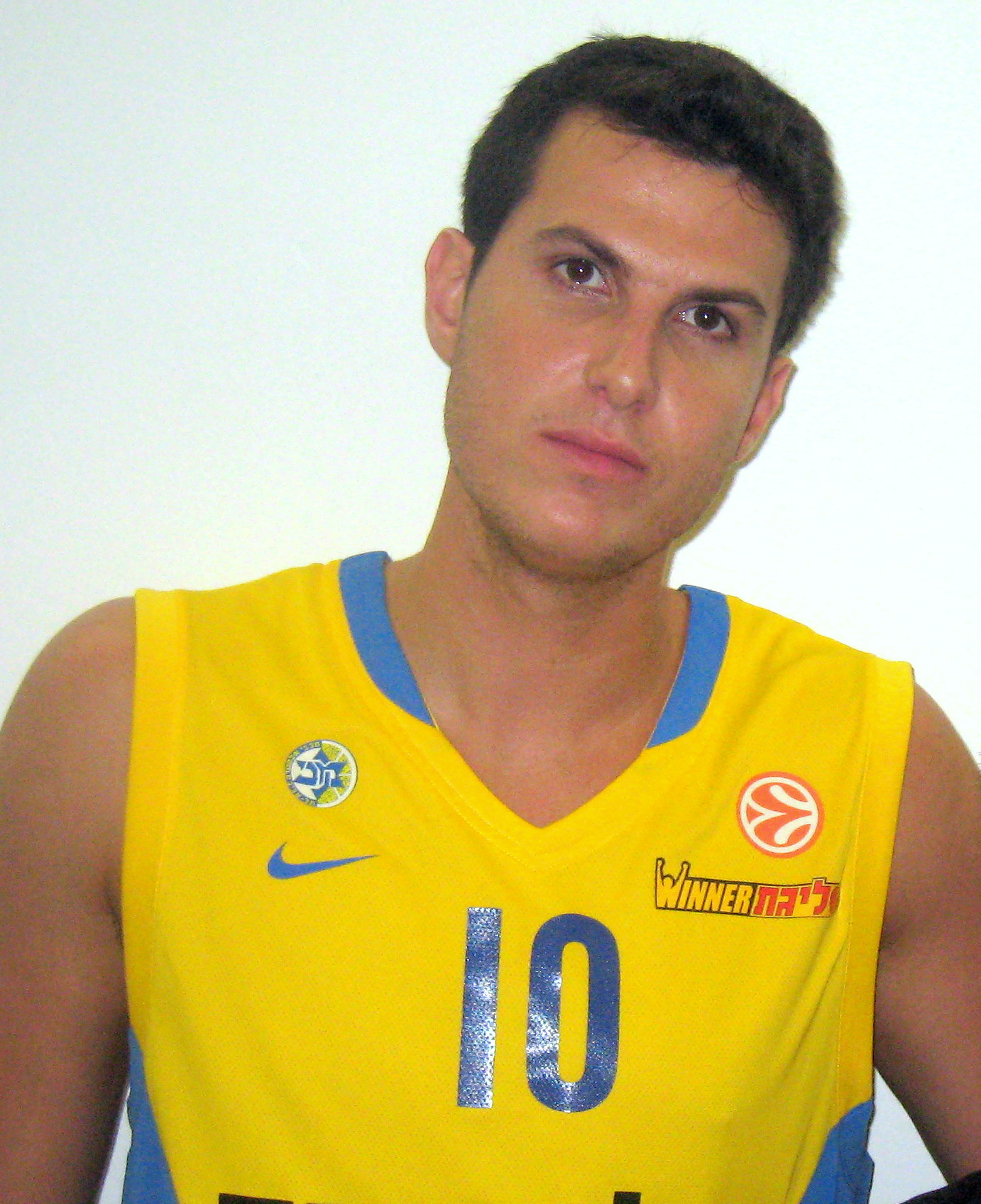
Guy Pnini

Contestants
Pos.	Player	Team
G	(Mexico) Paul Stoll (W)	Maccabi Haifa
G	(Israel) Afik Nissim	Hapoel Eilat
G	(Israel) Amit Simhon	Hapoel Gilboa Galil
G	(Israel) Dagan Yivzori	Hapoel Gilboa Galil
F	(Israel) Guy Pnini	Maccabi Tel Aviv
F	(Israel) Moshe Mizrahi	Maccabi Ashdod
G	(Israel) Yehu Orland	Barak Netanya
G	(Israel) Ben Reis	Bnei Herzliya

=== Slam Dunk Contest ===
Contestants
Pos.	Player	Team
F	(United States) Scotty Hopson (W)	Hapoel Eilat
F	(United States) Deron Washington	Barak Netanya
G	(United States) Kenny Hayes	Hapoel Gilboa Galil

== Awards ==
=== Regular season MVP ===
- (Israel) Gal Mekel (Maccabi Haifa)

=== All-BSL 1st team ===
- (Israel) Gal Mekel (Maccabi Haifa)
- (United States) Scotty Hopson (Hapoel Eilat)
- (United States) Devin Smith (Maccabi Tel Aviv)
- (Greece) Pat Calathes (Maccabi Haifa)
- (United States) Shawn James (Maccabi Tel Aviv)

=== Coach of the season ===
- (United States) Brad Greenberg (Maccabi Haifa)

=== Rising star ===
- (Israel) Bar Timor (Hapoel Tel Aviv)

=== Best Defender ===
- (United States) Shawn James (Maccabi Tel Aviv)

=== Most Improved Player ===
- (Israel) Eyal Shulman (Barak Netanya)

=== Sixth Man of the Season ===
- (Israel) Yehu Orland (Barak Netanya)
