= Roi Huber =

Israeli basketball player (born 1997)

Roi Huber רועי הובר
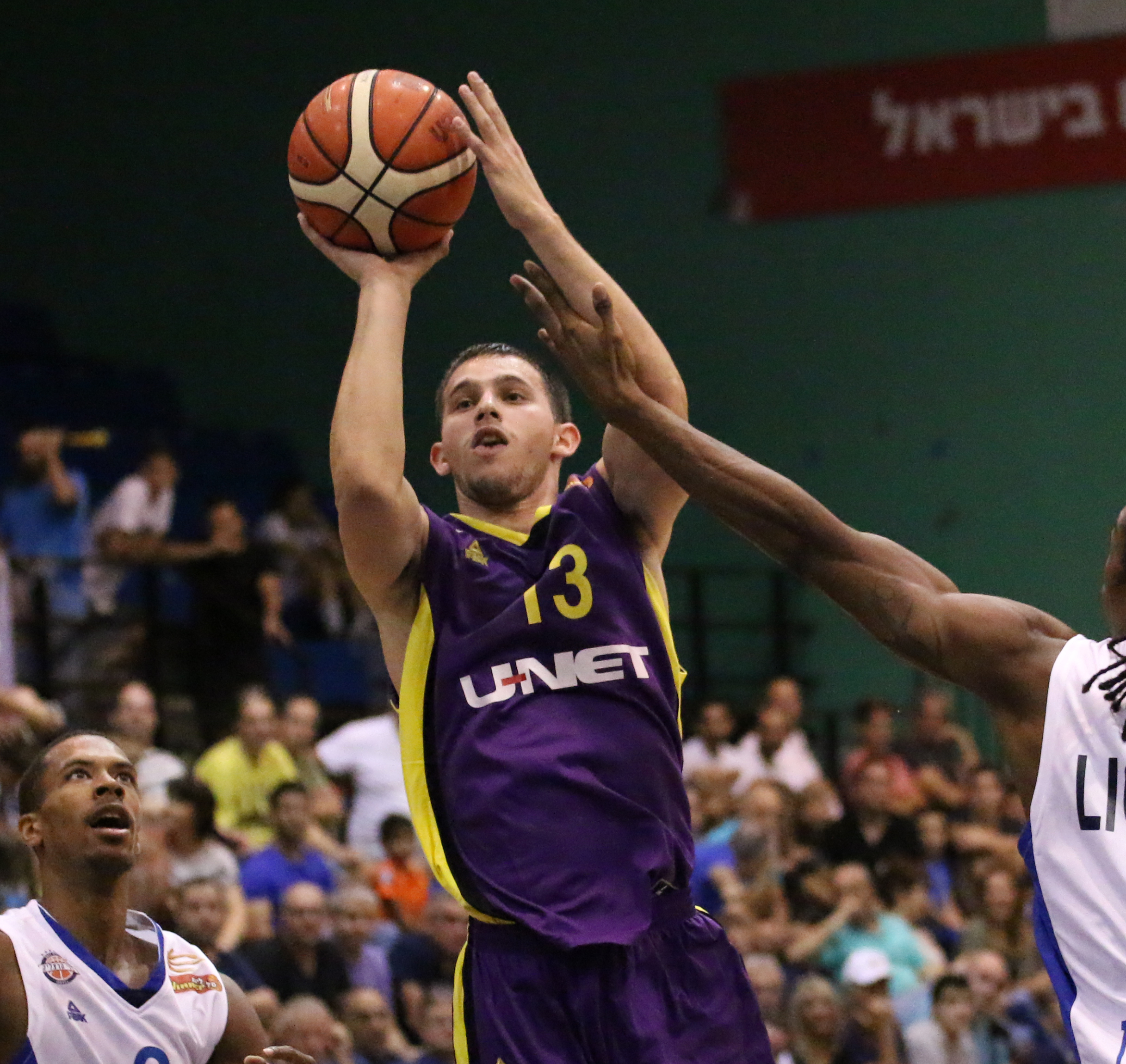
- Huber with Hapoel Holon 2016

No. 13 – Hapoel Jerusalem
- Position: Point guard / shooting guard
- League: Israeli Premier League; EuroCup

Personal information
- Born: February 10, 1997 (age 29) Kadima, Israel
- Listed height: 1.88 m (6 ft 2 in)
- Listed weight: 86 kg (190 lb)

Career information
- Playing career: 2014–present

Career history
- 2014–2015: Hapoel Kfar Saba
- 2015–2016: A.S. Ramat HaSharon
- 2016–2017: Hapoel Holon
- 2017–2018: Maccabi Haifa
- 2018–2019: Hapoel Holon
- 2019–2020: Hapoel Galil Elyon
- 2020–2022: Hapoel Eilat
- 2022–2024: Hapoel Galil Elyon
- 2024–2025: Maccabi Ramat Gan
- 2025–present: Hapoel Jerusalem

Career highlights
- Israeli Basketball Premier League Sixth Man of the Year (2025); All-Israeli League First Team (2024); Israeli League Cup champion (2025); Israeli SuperCup champion (2025)
Medals
Representing Israel
Men's basketball
FIBA Europe Under-20
Silver medal – second place	2017 Greece	National Team

Roi Huber (Hebrew: רועי הובר; born February 10, 1997) is an Israeli professional basketball player for Hapoel Jerusalem of the Israeli Premier League and the EuroCup. He was named the 2025 Israeli Basketball Premier League Sixth Man of the Year.

== Early life ==
Huber was born in Kadima, Israel. He played for Hapoel Lev Hasharon youth team and helped them to win the Israeli Youth State Cup in 2012, alongside his teammate Tamir Blatt. Huber joined Wingate Institute Academy in his late teens.

== Professional career ==
=== 2014-19 ===
In 2014, Huber started his professional career with Hapoel Kfar Saba.

On July 5, 2015, Huber signed with A.S. Ramat HaSharon of the Israeli National League. In 26 games played for Ramat HaSharon, he averaged 10.7 points, 3.3 rebounds and 5.3 assists per game. Huber led the National League in 3-point percentage with 47 percent.

On July 26, 2016, Huber signed a two-year deal with Hapoel Jerusalem. Two days later, he was loaned to Hapoel Holon for the 2016–17 season. Huber helped Holon reach the 2017 Israeli League Playoffs as the first seed, but they eventually were eliminated by Maccabi Haifa. In 35 games, he averaged 12.9 minutes, 3.3 points, 1.7 rebounds, and 1.6 assists per game, while shooting 55.7% from the field, 51.3% from three-point range, and 8-for-8 from the free throw line.

On July 27, 2017, Huber joined Maccabi Haifa for the 2017–18 season. In 28 games, he averaged 12.1 minutes, 2.5 points, 1.1 rebounds, and 1.2 assists per game, while shooting 55.7% from the field, 51.3% from three-point range, and 5-for-6 from the free throw line.

On June 27, 2018, Huber returned to Hapoel Holon for a second stint, signing a three-year deal. In 43 games, he averaged 8.6 minutes, 2.1 points, 0.7 rebounds, and 1.2 assists per game.

On July 27, 2019, Huber signed a one-year deal with Hapoel Galil Elyon of the Israeli National League.

=== 2020-24 ===
He returned to Hapoel Halon in 2019-20 for the start of the season, and in 10 games he averaged 24.2 minutes, 6.8 points, 1.0 rebounds, and 4.0 assists per game, shooting 10-for-10 from the free throw line.

On July 30, 2020, he signed with Hapoel Eilat of the Israeli Basketball Premier League. In 2020–21 in 37games, he averaged 15.2 minutes, 4.4 points, 1.2 rebounds, and 2.9 assists per game.

In 2021–22 with Hapoel Eilat in 32 games, he averaged 27.9 minutes,10.1 points, 2.7 rebounds, 4.7 assists, and 1.0 steals per game, while shooting 41.1% from three-point range, and 91.5% from the free throw line.

On May 28, 2022, he signed with Hapoel Galil Elyon of the Israeli Basketball Premier League. In 2022–23 in 28 games, he averaged 29.5 minutes, 11.0 points, 3.1 rebounds, 6.0 assists, and 1.0 steals per game.

In 2023–24 with Hapoel Galil Elyon in 30 games, he averaged 32.4 minutes, 13.6 points, 3.4 rebounds, and 7.5 assists per game. He was named All-Israeli League First Team (2024).

=== 2025-present ===
In 2024–25 with Ironi Ramat Gan of the Israeli Basketball Premier League, he played 39 games. For the season, he received the Israeli Basketball Premier League Sixth Man of the Year Award. He was also Israeli League Cup champion (2025), and Israeli SuperCup champion (2025).

Later that season he also played nine games with Hapoel Jerusalem of the Israeli Basketball Premier League. He averaged 18.4 minutes, 7.4 points, 2.1 rebounds, and 3.9 assists per game.

In 2025–26 with Hapoel Jerusalem, in 51 games he averaged 14.8 minutes, 5.4 points, 1.6 rebounds, and 2.1 assists per game.

Huber returned to Hapoel Jerusalem for the 2026–27 season.

== Israel national team ==
Huber was a member of the U-16, U-18 and U-20 Israel national teams.

In July 2017, Huber helped the Israeli under-20 national team to reach the 2017 FIBA Europe Under-20 Championship Finals, where they eventually lost to Greece. Huber finished the tournament averaging 8.9 points, 2.9 rebounds and 2.1 assists.

== Personal ==
Huber's older brother, Ophir, is also a professional basketball player.
