= Guni Israeli =

Israeli basketball player (born 1984)

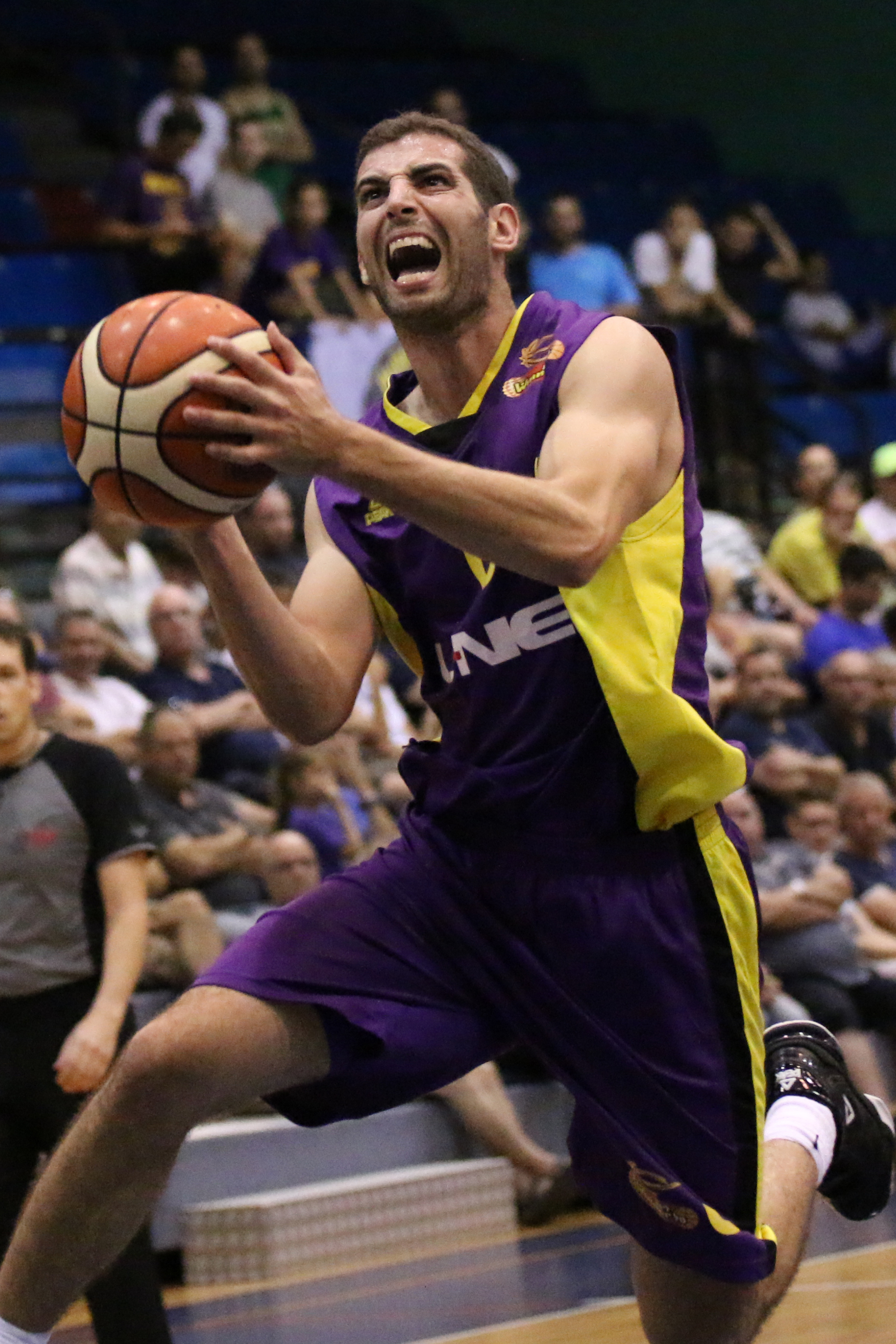
- Israeli playing for Hapoel Holon in 2016

Maccabi Ra'anana
- Position: Head coach
- League: Israeli Basketball Premier League

Personal information
- Born: 18 November 1984 (age 41) Gvat, Israel
- Listed height: 1.82 m (6 ft 0 in)

Career information
- Playing career: 2002–2021

Career history

Playing
- 2002–2004: Hapoel Lev Hasharon
- 2005: Maccabi Givat Shmuel
- 2005–2007: Hapoel Gilboa/Afula
- 2007–2008: Hapoel Holon
- 2008–2011: Hapoel Gilboa Galil
- 2011–2012: Hapoel Jerusalem
- 2012–2013: Maccabi Ashdod
- 2013–2017: Hapoel Holon
- 2017: Maccabi Ashdod
- 2017–2018: Maccabi Haifa
- 2018–2021: Hapoel Galil Elyon

Coaching
- 2022: Hapoel Jerusalem (assistant coach)
- 2023: Hapoel Gilboa Galil (assistant coach)
- 2024: Hapoel Holon (assistant coach)
- 2024–2026: Hapoel Galil Elyon (head coach)
- 2026–present: Maccabi Ra'anana (head coach)

Career highlights
- 2× Israeli League champion (2008, 2010); Israeli League Rising Star (2007); Israeli League Assists Leader (2007)

Guni Israeli (Hebrew: גוני יזרעאלי; born 18 November 1984) is an Israeli former professional basketball player and coach, who currently serves as head coach for Maccabi Ra'anana of the Israeli Basketball Premier League. In 2007, he was the Israeli Premier League Assists Leader, and played nearly 20 seasons professionally as a player.

== Early years ==
Israeli was born in Kibbutz Gvat, Israel. He played for Hapoel Emek Yizra'el (Jezreel Valley) youth team, he also played for Ort Leibovich, Netanya high-school team, together with Raviv Limonad and helped them to win the state championship.

== Professional career ==
In 2005, Israeli signed with Hapoel Gilboa/Afula. In his second season with Afula, he was named Israeli League Rising Star.

In 2007, he was the Israeli Premier League Assists Leader.

On 18 June 2007, Israeli signed with Hapoel Holon for the 2007–08 season. Israeli helped Holon to win the 2008 Israeli League Championship.

On 2 July 2008, Israeli signed with Hapoel Gilboa Galil. In his second season with the team, Israeli helped Gilboa Galil to win 2010 Israeli League Championship. On 22 June 2010, Israeli signed a one-year contract extension with Gilboa Galil.

On 29 July 2011, Israeli signed with a two-year contract with Hapoel Jerusalem.

On 18 July 2013, Israeli returned to Hapoel Holon for a second stint, signing a two-year deal. On 24 June 2015, Israeli signed a two-year contract extension with Holon.

On 6 June 2017, Israeli returned to Maccabi Ashdod for a second stint, signing a one-year deal. On 8 November 2017, Israeli parted ways with Ashdod after appearing in five games. Two days later, Israeli signed with Maccabi Haifa for the remainder of the season. On 28 March 2018, Israeli parted ways with Haifa.

On 26 June 2018, Israeli signed a two-year deal with Hapoel Galil Elyon of the Liga Leumit.
