= Bar Timor =

Israeli basketball player

Bar Timor בר טימור
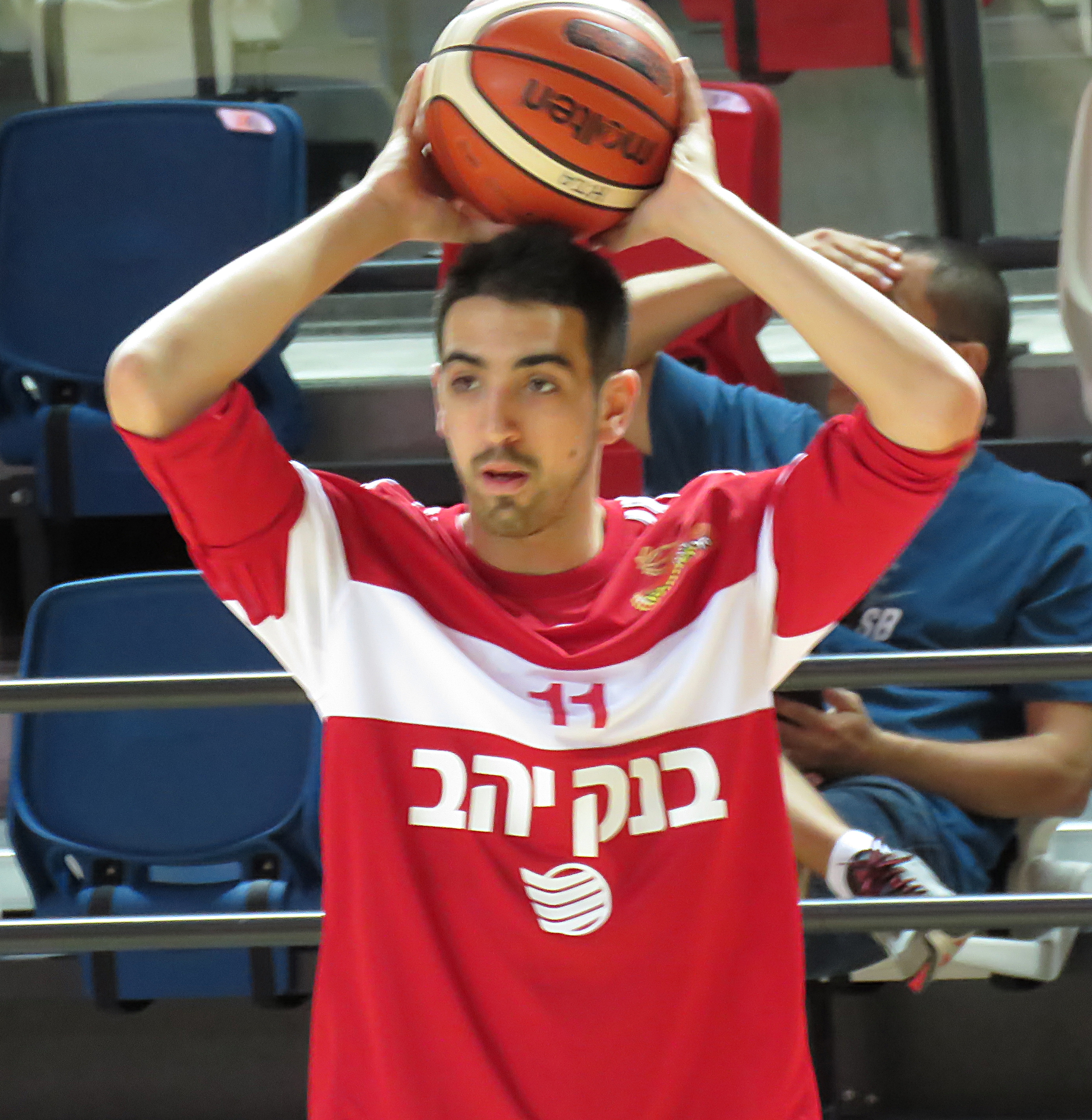

No. 10 – Hapoel Tel Aviv
- Position: Shooting guard / point guard
- League: Israeli Basketball Premier League; EuroLeague

Personal information
- Born: March 2, 1992 (age 34) Haifa, Israel
- Listed height: 1.91 m (6 ft 3 in)
- Listed weight: 185 lb (84 kg)

Career information
- NBA draft: 2014: undrafted
- Playing career: 2009–present

Career history
- 2009–2010: Hapoel Haifa
- 2010–2011: Hapoel Kiryat Tivon
- 2011–2013: Hapoel Tel Aviv
- 2013–2014: Alba Berlin
- 2014–2020: Hapoel Jerusalem
- 2020–present: Hapoel Tel Aviv

Career highlights
- EuroCup champion (2025); 2× Israeli League champion (2015, 2017); 2× Israeli State Cup winner (2019, 2020); Israeli League Cup winner (2019); Israeli League Sixth Man of the Year (2016, 2023); Israeli League Rising Star (2013)

Bar Timor (Hebrew: בר טימור; born March 2, 1992) is an Israeli professional basketball player and the team captain for Hapoel Tel Aviv of the Israeli Israeli Basketball Premier League and the EuroLeague. He also represents the Israeli national team.

In 2013 he was named the Israeli Basketball Premier League Rising Star, and in 2016 he was named Israeli Basketball Premier League 6th Man of the Year.

== Professional career ==
Timor was the Israeli Basketball Premier League Rising Star in 2013.

In June 2013, he signed a three-year deal with Alba Berlin of the Basketball Bundesliga in Germany. He played in only 10 games with the team, in 2013–14, due to a season ending eye injury. In the end of 2013/14 season he parted ways with Alba Berlin.

In July 2014, Timor signed a three-year deal with Hapoel Jerusalem. In 2015, helped the club win its first ever Israeli championship. He was named the Israeli Basketball Premier League 6th Man of the Year in 2016. In 2017, Timor won his second championship with Hapoel Jerusalem. On July 12, 2017, Timor signed a three-year contract extension with Hapoel Jerusalem.

On August 9, 2020, Timor signed with Hapoel Tel Aviv. In 2020–21 with the team,. he played 30 games in which he averaged 29.4 minutes, 12.5 points, 2.5 rebounds, 5.6 assists, and 1.2 steals per game, while shooting 47.5% from the floor.

In 2021–22 with the team, he played 30 games in which he averaged 27.3 minutes, 11.2 points, 3.3 rebounds, and 4.0 assists per game, while shooting 46.7% from the floor.

In 2022–23 with the team, he played 53 games in which he averaged 25.0 minutes, 7.9 points, 2.6 rebounds, and 3.4 assists per game, while shooting 81.8% from the free throw line.

In 2023–24 with the team, he played 56 games in which he averaged 24.5 minutes, 10.1 points, 2.4 rebounds, 5.1 assists, and 1.1 steals per game, while shooting 46.7% from the floor.

In 2024–25 with the team, he played 55 games in which he averaged 20.3 minutes, 6.8 points, 2.1 rebounds, and 3.3 assists per game, while shooting 45.8% from the floor.

In 2025–26 with the team, he played 40 games in which he averaged 16.3 minutes, 6.3 points, 1.9 rebounds, and 2.9 assists per game, while shooting 49.5% from the floor.

== Israeli national team ==
Timor played with the senior Israeli national basketball team at the EuroBasket 2015, and in succeeding years over the next decade.

== Personal life ==
Timor was born in Haifa, Israel, and has dual German citizenship.
