= Peak Sport Products =

Chinese sportswear/sports equipment company

- Trade name: Peak Sport
- Native name: 匹克体育用品有限公司
- Romanized name: Pǐkè Tǐyù Yòngpǐn Yǒuxiàngōngsī
- Company type: Private
- Industry: Sports equipment
- Founded: 1989; 37 years ago
- Headquarters: Quanzhou, China
- Products: Footwear, sportswear
- Website: www.peaksportshoes.com

Peak Sport Products
- Simplified Chinese: 匹克
- Traditional Chinese: 匹克
Transcriptions
Standard Mandarin
- Hanyu Pinyin: Pǐkè

Peak Sport Products Co., Limited is a Chinese manufacturing company of sportswear and footwear based in Quanzhou.

Basketball has been Peak's strongest business since the beginning. Nowadays, the company covers a variety of sports such as association football, volleyball, running, tennis, and other sports. Peak is developing its business in America, Europe, Asia and Australia with more than 5000 exclusive stores. The company also owns many factories in Asia with 600 employees and more than 6,000 factory workers.

== Business areas ==
Peak Sport designs, develops, manufactures, distributes and markets its sportswear products under the Peak brand. Peak Sport sells all of its products in China on a wholesale basis to distributors who operate, either directly or through third-party retail outlet operators, authorized Peak retail outlets.

It also sells its products on a wholesale basis to overseas customers, as well as to overseas distributors who then sell the products to consumers, retailers or sports teams and clubs.

In mid-2009, Peak Sport Products Company had a distribution network of 5,667 authorized Peak retail outlets in China, which were operated either by the Peak Sport's distributors or by their third-party retail outlet operators.

PEAK's brand presence in the international basketball market has been steadily growing. Their exclusive innovative technology, TAICHI, had sold over 40 million pairs of shoes by the end of 2022. The brand has expanded its operations to 110 countries and regions around the world.

Xu Zhihua, CEO of the PEAK Group, expressed the brand's vision, stating, "PEAK will leverage basketball-related products as our ace, aiming to establish ourselves as a global professional sports brand as quickly as possible.
