= Yehu Orland =

Israeli basketball player and coach

Yehu Orland יהוא אורלנד
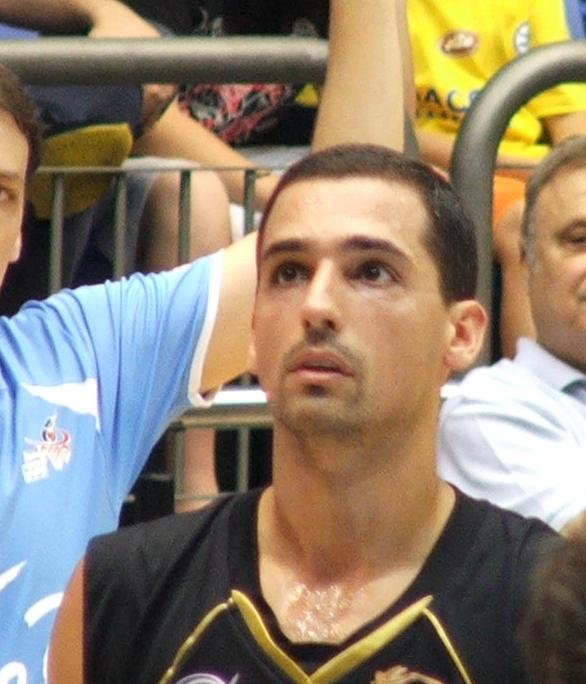

Bnei Herzliya
- Title: Head coach
- League: Israeli Basketball Premier League

Personal information
- Born: September 14, 1981 (age 45) Israel
- Listed height: 6 ft 4 in (1.93 m)
- Listed weight: 205 lb (93 kg)

Career information
- Playing career: 1999–2016
- Position: Shooting guard

Career history

Playing
- 1999–2001: Hapoel Galil Elyon
- 2001–2002: Maccabi Ra'anana
- 2002–2003: Maccabi Ramat Gan
- 2003–2006: Elitzur Ashkelon
- 2006–2007: Hapoel Afula
- 2007–2008: Hapoel Jerusalem
- 2008–2009: Hapoel Holon
- 2009–2011: Maccabi Rishon LeZion
- 2011–2014: Elitzur Netanya
- 2014–2016: Maccabi Ashdod

Coaching
- 2019–2020: Hapoel Emek Hefer
- 2021–2023: Hapoel Hevel Modi'in
- 2023–2024: Maccabi Ra'anana
- 2024–present: Bnei Herzliya

Career highlights
- Israeli Basketball Premier League Sixth Man of the Year (2013)

Yehu Orland (Hebrew: יהוא אורלנד; born September 14, 1981) is an Israeli professional basketball coach, and former player. He currently serves as the head coach of Bnei Herzliya in the Israeli Basketball Premier League. He played the shooting guard position, and was the 2013 Israeli Basketball Premier League Sixth Man of the Year.

== Biography ==
Orland was born in Israel, and is 6 ft 4 in (193 cm) tall, and weighs 205 pounds (93 kg).

He has played basketball for Hapoel Jerusalem in 2007–08, GreenTops Netanya in 2011–14, and Maccabi Ashdod in 2014–16. Orland was named the 2013 Israeli Basketball Premier League Sixth Man of the Year.

In 2019-20 Orland was head coach of Hapoel Emek Hefer.

He would coach Maccabi Ra'anana during their 2023 preseason tour in the United States, which started days after the start of the Gaza war.
