= 2021 Israeli Basketball League Cup =

Israeli basketball pre-season tournament

Tournament details
- Country: Israel
- Venue: Drive in Arena
- Dates: 13–26 September 2021
- Teams: 12
- Defending champions: Maccabi Tel Aviv

Final positions
- Champions: Maccabi Tel Aviv
- Runners-up: Hapoel Eilat
- Semifinalists: Hapoel Holon; Hapoel Jerusalem

Tournament statistics
- Matches played: 11

Awards
- MVP: (United States) James Nunnally
- All statistics correct as of 26 September 2021.

The 2021 Israeli Basketball League Cup, for sponsorships reasons the Winner League Cup, is the 16th edition of the pre-season tournament of the Israeli Basketball Premier League. Twelve Israeli Premier League team's participated except from Elitzur Netanya which chose not to take part in light of the short preparation time available.

== Bracket ==
First round 13-14 September
13 September, 21:00
Ironi Ness Ziona	79
Hapoel Tel Aviv	105
14 September, 19:00
Hapoel Haifa	96
Hapoel Galil Elyon	71
14 September, 20:00
Hapoel Jerusalem	98
Bnei Herzliya	75
13 September, 19:00
Hapoel Be'er Sheva	75
Maccabi Rishon LeZion	80

Quarterfinals; 19-22 September
19 September, 21:00
Hapoel Holon	89
Hapoel Tel Aviv	80
21 September, 21:00
Hapoel Eilat	94
Hapoel Haifa	79
19 September, 18:00
Hapoel Gilboa Galil	60
Hapoel Jerusalem	73
22 September, 21:00
Maccabi Tel Aviv	87
Maccabi Rishon LeZion	68

Semifinals; 23-24 September
23 September, 21:00
Hapoel Holon	77
Hapoel Eilat	79
24 September, 14:30
Maccabi Tel Aviv	81
Hapoel Jerusalem	65

Final; 26 September
26 September, 20:45
Maccabi Tel Aviv	92
Hapoel Eilat	62

== First round ==
13 September	Hapoel Be'er Sheva	75–80	Maccabi Rishon LeZion	Be'er Sheva
19:00	Scoring by quarter: 25–25, 10–27, 26–13, 14–15
5 STARS	Pts: Pardon 19; Rebs: Pardon 12; Asts: Demps 5 PIR: Pardon 28	Boxscore	Pts: Clyburn 31; Rebs: Clyburn 9 Asts: Williams 6 PIR: Clyburn 39	Arena: Conch Arena; Attendance: 750; Referees: Kfir Mualem, Pini Rimon, David Kolongi

13 September	Ironi Ness Ziona	79–105	Hapoel Tel Aviv	Ness Ziona
21:00	Scoring by quarter: 11–30, 20–26, 22–27, 26–22
5 PLUS	Pts: Farrell & Soares 15; Rebs: Soares 11; Asts: Gutt 6 PIR: Soares 24	Boxscore	Pts: Zalmanson 17; Rebs: Tokoto 6 Asts: Timor 9 PIR: Timor 27	Arena: Lev Hamoshava; Attendance: 800; Referees: Nir Meirson, Ori Shalhavi, Harel Kidron

14 September	Hapoel Haifa	96–71	Hapoel Galil Elyon	Haifa
19:00	Scoring by quarter: 23–8, 26–15, 18–22, 29–26
5 STARS	Pts: James 21; Rebs: Weisz 8 Asts: Vargas 13; PIR: James 26	Boxscore	Pts: Eisendorf 16; Rebs: Eisendorf & Moshkovitz 6 Asts: Tal 5 PIR: Eisendorf 18	Arena: Romema Arena; Attendance: 550; Referees: Ofer Manheim, Lior Beynish, Nir Keren

14 September	Hapoel Jerusalem	98–75	Bnei Herzliya	Jerusalem
20:00	Scoring by quarter: 28–28, 27–12, 26–18, 17–17
5 PLUS	Pts: Obasohan 17; Rebs: Maker 9 Asts: Maker 5 PIR: Segev 22	Boxscore	Pts: Onuaku 18; Rebs: Onuaku 12; Asts: Kravitz 4 PIR: Onuaku 22	Arena: Pais Arena; Attendance: 2,250; Referees: Erez Gurion, Zahi Habdali, Or Zrur

== Quarterfinals ==
19 September	Hapoel Gilboa Galil	60–73	Hapoel Jerusalem	Tel Aviv
18:00	Scoring by quarter: 20–22, 17–25, 11–13, 12–13
5 STARS	Pts: Perrantes 15; Rebs: Srur 8 Asts: Harrell 4 PIR: Srur 16	Boxscore	Pts: Adams & Obasohan 22; Rebs: Segev 9 Asts: Adams 5 PIR: Obasohan 23	Arena: Drive in Arena; Attendance: 1,200; Referees: David Romano, Elad Leibovich, Noam Gordon

19 September	Hapoel Holon	89–80	Hapoel Tel Aviv	Tel Aviv
21:00	Scoring by quarter: 26–21, 19–12, 26–25, 18–22
5 PLUS	Pts: Ragland 25; Rebs: Johnson & Kyser 6 Asts: Ragland 8 PIR: Ragland 34	Boxscore	Pts: Zalmanson 18; Rebs: Tokoto 6 Asts: Brown 5 PIR: Zalmanson 21	Arena: Drive in Arena; Attendance: 2,600; Referees: Amit Balak, Adar Pe'er, Rotem Koza

21 September	Hapoel Eilat	94–79	Hapoel Haifa	Tel Aviv
21:00	Scoring by quarter: 29–16, 19–24, 19–11, 27–28
5 SPORT	Pts: Carter 19; Rebs: Patton 8 Asts: Huber 8 PIR: Carter 25	Boxscore	Pts: Allen 30; Rebs: Thompson 8 Asts: Vargas 7 PIR: Allen 33	Arena: Drive in Arena; Attendance: 600; Referees: Dan Yalon, Guy Shmueli, David Izmirli

22 September	Maccabi Tel Aviv	87–68	Maccabi Rishon LeZion	Tel Aviv
21:00	Scoring by quarter: 25–28, 19–9, 22–8, 21–23
5 LIVE	Pts: Žižić 14; Rebs: Žižić 7 Asts: Evans & Ziv 6 PIR: Žižić 22	Boxscore	Pts: Williams 16; Rebs: Clyburn 8 Asts: Palatin & Artzi 3 PIR: Dime 12	Arena: Drive in Arena; Attendance: 2,800; Referees: Erez Gurion, Nir Meirson, Alex Naftali

== Semifinals ==
23 September	Hapoel Holon	77–79	Hapoel Eilat	Tel Aviv
21:00	Scoring by quarter: 30–20, 16–28, 18–17, 13–14
5 SPORT	Pts: Ragland 17; Rebs: Menco 6 Asts: Ragland 6 PIR: Kyser 20	Boxscore	Pts: Allen 22; Rebs: Szuchman 7 Asts: Huber 7 PIR: Allen 26	Arena: Drive in Arena; Attendance: 1,200; Referees: Omer Esteron, Kfir Mualem, Ori Shalhavi

24 September	Maccabi Tel Aviv	81–65	Hapoel Jerusalem	Tel Aviv
14:30	Scoring by quarter: 16–24, 19–16, 21–16, 25–9
5 SPORT	Pts: Reynolds 22; Rebs: Reynolds 6 Asts: Nunnally 6 PIR: Reynolds 24	Boxscore	Pts: Kilpatrick 16; Rebs: Segev 7 Asts: Obasohan 3 PIR: Obasohan 11	Arena: Drive in Arena; Attendance: 3,492; Referees: Amit Balak, Ofer Manheim, Elad Leibovich

== Final ==
26 September	Maccabi Tel Aviv	92–62	Hapoel Eilat	Tel Aviv
20:45	Scoring by quarter: 28–18, 17–15, 19–21, 28–8
5 SPORT	Pts: Nunnally 19; Rebs: Sorkin 10; Asts: Nunnally 5 PIR: Nunnally 28	Boxscore	Pts: Patton 11; Rebs: Patton 7 Asts: Allen 7 PIR: Ben-Moshe 10	Arena: Drive in Arena; Attendance: 3,497; Referees: Omer Esteron, David Romano, Pini Rimon

Starters:			Pts	Reb	Ast
G	1	(United States) Scottie Wilbekin	6	1	0
G	2	(United States) Keenan Evans	11	2	3
C	8	(United States) Jalen Reynolds	9	5	3
C	9	(Israel) Roman Sorkin	16	10	1
F	21	(United States) James Nunnally	19	6	5
Reserves:					
G	3	(Israel) Ido Menchel	0	0	0
F	4	(United States) Angelo Caloiaro	8	3	2
G	12	(Israel) John DiBartolomeo	8	3	3
F	14	(Israel) Oz Blayzer	6	0	0
C	15	(Israel) Jake Cohen	7	3	0
PG	88	(Israel) Oded Brandwein	2	0	1
G	99	(Israel) Yiftach Ziv	DNP		
Head coach:
(Greece) Ioannis Sfairopoulos

M. Tel Aviv	H. Eilat

M. Tel Aviv	Statistics	H. Eilat
23/37 (62%)	2 point field goals	17/40 (43%)
10/26 (38%)	3 point field goals	6/24 (25%)
16/20 (80%)	Free throws	10/17 (59%)
36	Rebounds	43
18	Assists	14
9	Steals	4
8	Turnovers	17
7	Blocks	0

Starters:			Pts	Reb	Ast
G	2	(United States) Bryon Allen	10	2	7
C	7	(Israel) Miron Ruina	4	4	1
PG	10	(Israel) Roi Huber	6	4	3
G/F	18	(Israel) Zuf Ben-Moshe	10	6	1
C	23	(United States) Justin Patton	11	7	1
Reserves:					
PF	0	(United States) Romello White	7	3	0
G	6	(Israel) Yarden Ashkenazi	0	0	0
SG	8	(Israel) Joaquin Szuchman	2	2	1
PG	11	(Israel) Ido Harel	2	0	0
PF	13	(Israel) Ben Carter	10	5	0
G	24	(Israel) Or Ashkenazi	0	0	0
Head coach:
(Israel) Ariel Beit-Halahmy

2021 League Cup Winners
Maccabi Tel Aviv
9^{th} title
