= 2019 Israeli Basketball League Cup =

Israeli basketball pre-season tournament

Tournament details
- Arena: Drive in Arena, Tel Aviv; Toto Hall, Holon
- Dates: 19–28 October 2019

Final positions
- Champions: Hapoel Jerusalem (5th title)
- Runners-up: Maccabi Tel Aviv

Awards and statistics
- MVP: (Nigeria) Suleiman Braimoh

The 2019 Israeli Basketball League Cup, for sponsorships reasons the Winner League Cup, is the 14th edition of the pre-season tournament of the Israeli Basketball Premier League.

On September 28, 2019, Hapoel Jerusalem have won the title for the fifth time after an 84–83 dramatic win over Maccabi Tel Aviv in the Final. Suleiman Braimoh was named the Tournament MVP.

== Bracket ==
First Round; 19-20 September
Hapoel Tel Aviv	111
Maccabi Ashdod	92
Maccabi Rishon LeZion	70
Ironi Nahariya	73
Hapoel Be'er Sheva	91
Hapoel Gilboa Galil	72
Ironi Nes Ziona	90
Maccabi Haifa	68

Quarterfinals; 23-24 September
Maccabi Tel Aviv	87
Hapoel Tel Aviv	67
Hapoel Holon	77
Ironi Nahariya	88
Hapoel Jerusalem	95
Hapoel Be'er Sheva	70
Hapoel Eilat	76
Ironi Nes Ziona	86

Semifinals; 26 September
Maccabi Tel Aviv	76
Ironi Nahariya	65
Hapoel Jerusalem	94
Ironi Nes Ziona	88

Final; 28 September
Maccabi Tel Aviv	83
Hapoel Jerusalem	84

== First round ==
=== I. Nes Ziona vs. M.Haifa ===
19 September 2019	Ironi Nes Ziona	90–68	Maccabi Haifa	Ness Ziona
20:00	Scoring by quarter: 17–18, 24–12, 26–17, 23–21
Sport 5	Pts: Gutt 26; Rebs: Withey 11; Asts: Gutt 6 PIR: Gutt 28	Box Score	Pts: Anderson 17; Rebs: Workman 13; Asts: Cohn 6 PIR: Workman 21	Arena: Lev Hamoshava; Attendance: 700; Referees: Dan Yalon, Ori Shalhavi, Alex Naftali

=== M. Rishon LeZion vs. I. Nahariya ===
19 September 2019	Maccabi Rishon LeZion	70–73	Ironi Nahariya	Rishon LeZion
20:15	Scoring by quarter: 25–23, 19–24, 15–15, 11–11
Sport 5	Pts: Swing 14; Rebs: Williams 9 Asts: Tishman 5 PIR: Blayzer 13	Box Score	Pts: Koulechov 17; Rebs: Segev 10; Asts: Waters 7 PIR: Adrien 21	Arena: Beit Maccabi; Attendance: 1500; Referees: Gili Cohen, Lior Beinish, Noam Gordon

=== H. Be'er Sheva vs. H. Gilboa Galil ===
19 September 2019	Hapoel Be'er Sheva	91–72	Hapoel Gilboa Galil	Be'er Sheva
20:30	Scoring by quarter: 26–19, 19–17, 25–21, 21–15
Sport 5	Pts: Weisz 22; Rebs: Zack 12; Asts: Williams & Cohen-Saban 6 PIR: Weisz 25	Box Score	Pts: Tillman 16; Rebs: Flaisher 10; Asts: Flaisher 6 PIR: Tillman 25	Arena: Conch Arena; Attendance: 600; Referees: David Romano, David Kolangi, Or Zarur

=== H. Tel Aviv vs. M. Ashdod ===
20 September 2019	Hapoel Tel Aviv	111–92	Maccabi Ashdod	Tel Aviv
15:00	Scoring by quarter: 24–25, 33–21, 25–25, 29–21
Sport 5	Pts: Ginat 28; Rebs: Treadwell 9 Asts: Szuchman 12; PIR: Ginat 31	Box Score	Pts: Henton 20; Rebs: Henton 8 Asts: Johnson 6 PIR: Henton 26	Arena: Drive in Arena; Attendance: 2400; Referees: Omer Esteron, David Eizmirli, Hadar Pe'er

== Quarterfinals ==
=== H. Eilat vs. I. Nes Ziona ===
23 September 2019	Hapoel Eilat	76–86	Ironi Nes Ziona	Tel Aviv
18:45	Scoring by quarter: 19–24, 17–31, 30–20, 10–11
Sport 5	Pts: Thompson 14; Rebs: Menco 12; Asts: Ben-Chimol 6 PIR: Menco 15	Box Score	Pts: Limonad 19; Rebs: Hollowell 10; Asts: Gutt 5 PIR: Hollowell 23	Arena: Drive in Arena; Attendance: 600; Referees: Ofer Manheim, Rotem Koza, Yoav Lubovich

=== H. Jerusalem vs. H. Be'er Sheva ===
23 September 2019	Hapoel Jerusalem	95–70	Hapoel Be'er Sheva	Tel Aviv
21:00	Scoring by quarter: 25–16, 23–17, 21–18, 26–19
Sport 5	Pts: Brown 18; Rebs: Braimoh 9 Asts: Feldeine 6 PIR: Braimoh 23	Box Score	Pts: Williams 24; Rebs: Zack 10; Asts: Williams 5 PIR: Weisz 17	Arena: Drive in Arena; Attendance: 800; Referees: Zachi Havdali, Pini Rimon, Eran Shmuel

=== H. Holon vs. I.Nahariya ===
24 September 2019	Hapoel Holon	77–88	Ironi Nahariya	Tel Aviv
18:45	Scoring by quarter: 19–17, 19–30, 24–20, 15–21
Sport 5	Pts: Williams 14; Rebs: Johnson 7 Asts: Ohayon & Thompson 6 PIR: Thompson 18	Box Score	Pts: McNeal 20; Rebs: Adrien & Koulechov 7 Asts: Waters 7 PIR: McNeal 25	Arena: Drive in Arena; Attendance: 1200; Referees: Kfir Mualem, Nir Meirson, Gil Gordon

=== M. Tel Aviv vs. H. Tel Aviv ===
24 September 2019	Maccabi Tel Aviv	87–67	Hapoel Tel Aviv	Tel Aviv
21:00	Scoring by quarter: 25–19, 22–17, 15–13, 25–18
Sport 5	Pts: Casspi 18; Rebs: Avdija 11; Asts: Zoosman 5 PIR: Casspi 33	Box Score	Pts: Ginat 17; Rebs: Treadwell 7 Asts: Ginat 4 PIR: Ginat 21	Arena: Drive in Arena; Attendance: 3500; Referees: Amit Ballack, Erez Gurion, Elad Leibovich

== Semifinals ==
=== H. Jerusalem vs. I. Nes Ziona ===
26 September 2019	Hapoel Jerusalem	94–88	Ironi Nes Ziona	Holon
18:45	Scoring by quarter: 30–28, 22–21, 21–15, 21–24
Sport 5	Pts: Braimoh 19; Rebs: Lockett 11; Asts: Brown 5 PIR: Lockett 27	Box Score	Pts: Cook 17; Rebs: Withey 9 Asts: Fisher 5 PIR: Fisher 20	Arena: Holon Toto Hall; Attendance: 2500; Referees: Gili Cohen, David Romano, David Eizmirli

=== M. Tel Aviv vs. I. Nahariya ===
26 September 2019	Maccabi Tel Aviv	76–65	Ironi Nahariya	Holon
21:00	Scoring by quarter: 22–16, 12–15, 21–21, 21–13
Sport 5	Pts: Wilbekin 14; Rebs: Avdija 5 Asts: Wolters 4 PIR: Wilbekin 20	Box Score	Pts: Adrien 17; Rebs: Adrien 7 Asts: Waters & Gaffney 4 PIR: Adrien 22	Arena: Holon Toto Hall; Attendance: 3000; Referees: Sefi Shemesh, Dan Yalon, Alex Nafatali

== Final ==
=== M. Tel Aviv vs. H. Jerusalem ===
28 September 2019	Maccabi Tel Aviv	83–84	Hapoel Jerusalem	Holon
20:45	Scoring by quarter: 20–28, 26–18, 19–17, 18–21
Sport 5	Pts: Bryant 18; Rebs: Bryant 7 Asts: Wilbekin 7 PIR: Casspi 21	Box Score	Pts: Feldeine 21; Rebs: Levi 8 Asts: Blatt 8 PIR: Feldeine 23	Arena: Holon Toto Hall; Attendance: 5400; Referees: Omer Esteron, Kfir Mualem, Lior Beynish

Starters:			Pts	Reb	Ast
G	14	(United States) Nate Wolters	6	1	5
G	1	(United States) Scottie Wilbekin	11	2	7
G	0	(United States) Elijah Bryant	18	7	1
F	7	(Israel) Omri Casspi	14	5	2
C	28	(United States) Tarik Black	10	5	0
Reserves:					
G	50	(Israel) Yovel Zoosman	9	1	1
F	15	(Israel) Jake Cohen	8	0	2
F	2	(United States) Quincy Acy	5	2	1
G	8	(Israel) Deni Avdija	2	2	0
G	12	(Israel) John DiBartolomeo	0	2	3
G	18	(Israel) Dori Sahar	DNP		
Head coach:
(Greece) Ioannis Sfairopoulos

M. Tel Aviv	H. Jerusalem

Tel Aviv	Statistics	H. Jerusalem
23/40 (57%)	2 point field goals	19/43 (44%)
23/40 (36%)	3 point field goals	9/24 (38%)
13/16 (81%)	Free throws	19/22 (86%)
34	Rebounds	38
22	Assists	19
6	Steals	8
12	Turnovers	9
3	Blocks	5

Starters:			Pts	Reb	Ast
G	6	(Israel) Tamir Blatt	7	0	8
G	14	(Dominican Republic) James Feldeine	21	3	2
F	24	(United States) Trent Lockett	10	2	1
F	17	(Nigeria) Suleiman Braimoh	16	5	1
C	20	(Israel) Idan Zalmanson	4	4	0
Reserves:					
G	69	(United States) J'Covan Brown	12	2	3
C	49	(Lithuania) Mindaugas Kupšas	9	6	1
F	15	(Israel) Nimrod Levi	3	8	2
G	11	(Israel) Bar Timor	2	1	1
G	5	(Israel) Daniel Rosenbaum	DNP		
G	22	(Israel) Dvir Ringvald	DNP		
Head coach:
(Israel) Oded Kattash

2019 League Cup Winners
Hapoel Jerusalem
5th title
