= 2019 Israeli Basketball Premier League Final Four =

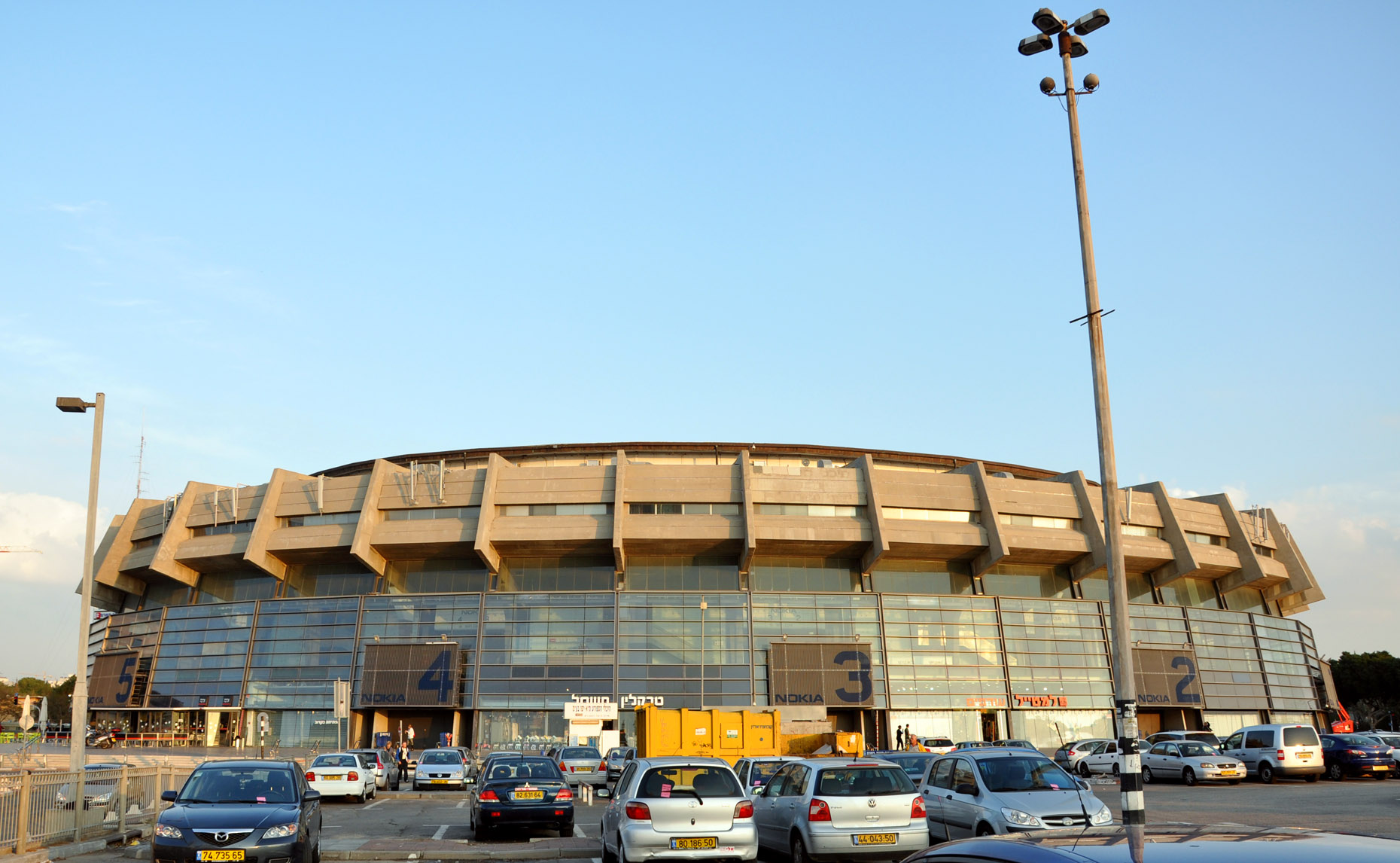
- The Menora Mivtachim Arena hosted the Final Four
- Season: 2018–19 Israeli Premier League

Tournament details
- Arena: Menora Mivtachim Arena; Tel Aviv
- Dates: 10–13 June 2019

Final positions
- Champions: Maccabi Tel Aviv (53rd title)
- Runners-up: Maccabi Rishon LeZion

Awards and statistics
- MVP: (Israel) John DiBartolomeo

The 2019 Israeli Basketball Premier League Final Four, for sponsorship reasons the Winner League Final Four, the concluding tournament of the 2018–19 Israeli Basketball Premier League. The event was hosted at the Menora Mivtachim Arena, Tel Aviv from June 10 until June 13, 2019.

Maccabi Tel Aviv have won the title for the 53rd time after defeating Maccabi Rishon LeZion 89–75 in the Final. John DiBartolomeo was named the Final Four MVP.

== Results ==
=== Bracket ===
Semifinals
June 10
Maccabi Tel Aviv	85
Hapoel Eilat	83
June 10
Hapoel Jerusalem	86
Maccabi Rishon LeZion	92

Final
June 13
Maccabi Tel Aviv	89
Maccabi Rishon LeZion	75

== Semifinals ==
June 10, 2019	Maccabi Tel Aviv	85–83	Hapoel Eilat	Tel Aviv
19:00	Scoring by quarter: 22–20, 20–17, 18–19, 25–27
Sport 5	Pts: Wilbekin 21; Rebs: Black 11; Asts: Roll 5 PIR: Wilbekin 31	Box Score	Pts: Tokoto 22; Rebs: Braimoh 7 Asts: Bryant 5 PIR: Tokoto 29	Arena: Menora Mivtachim Arena; Attendance: 9000; Referees: David Romano, Kfir Mualem, Dan Yalon

Starters:			Pts	Reb	Ast
G	1	(United States) Scottie Wilbekin	21	5	4
G	7	(United States) DeAndre Kane	3	0	0
G/F	50	(Israel) Yovel Zoosman	8	2	1
F/C	15	(Israel) Jake Cohen	6	1	0
C	28	(United States) Tarik Black	5	11	2
Reserves:					
F/C	3	(United States) Johnny O'Bryant III	15	2	0
G/F	5	(United States) Michael Roll	12	2	5
G	12	(Israel) John DiBartolomeo	8	0	2
C	9	(Israel) Alex Tyus	7	8	0
F	4	(United States) Angelo Caloiaro	0	3	0
G/F	8	(Israel) Deni Avdija	0	1	0
G	18	(Israel) Dori Sahar	DNP		
Head coach:
(Greece) Ioannis Sfairopoulos

M. Tel Aviv	H. Eilat

Tel Aviv	Statistics	Eilat
22/37 (59%)	2 point field goals	23/39 (59%)
8/26 (31%)	3 point field goals	4/16 (25%)
17/22 (77%)	Free throws	25/30 (83%)
35	Rebounds	30
14	Assists	18
6	Steals	10
13	Turnovers	13
1	Blocks	3

Starters:			Pts	Reb	Ast
G	11	(Israel) Avi Ben-Chimol	5	3	1
G	3	(United States) Elijah Bryant	13	5	5
F	12	(Israel) Rafi Menco	10	2	4
F	1	(United States) JP Tokoto	22	4	3
C	20	(Israel) Idan Zalmanson	4	1	2
Reserves:					
F/C	17	(Nigeria) Suleiman Braimoh	16	7	2
F	83	(Israel) Jonathan Skjöldebrand	11	2	1
G/F	8	(Israel) Frédéric Bourdillon	2	0	0
G	34	(Israel) David Cohn	DNP		
F	6	(Israel) Noam Edri	DNP		
G	9	(Israel) Itay Shriki	DNP		
G	24	(Israel) Roy Indik	DNP		
Head coach:
(Israel) Sharon Drucker

June 10, 2019	Hapoel Jerusalem	86–92	Maccabi Rishon LeZion	Tel Aviv
21:50	Scoring by quarter: 25–24, 25–23, 19–23, 17–22
Sport 5	Pts: Brown 19; Rebs: Thomas 14; Asts: Thomas 4 PIR: Thomas 25	Box Score	Pts: Simpson 28; Rebs: Simpson 20; Asts: Tishman 7 PIR: Simpson 42	Arena: Menora Mivtachim Arena; Attendance: 9755; Referees: Gili Cohen, Ofer Manheim, Nir Meirson

Starters:			Pts	Reb	Ast
G	12	(Israel) Yogev Ohayon	0	1	0
G	6	(Israel) Tamir Blatt	11	1	3
G	14	(Dominican Republic) James Feldeine	14	4	1
F/C	35	(United States) TaShawn Thomas	11	14	4
C	22	(United States) Josh Owens	6	5	1
Reserves:					
G	69	(United States) J'Covan Brown	19	1	3
C	1	(Israel) Amar'e Stoudemire	12	6	3
F	17	(United States) Da'Sean Butler	8	3	0
G	11	(Israel) Bar Timor	3	2	0
F	8	(Israel) Lior Eliyahu	2	0	0
C	23	(Israel) Alex Chubrevich	0	0	0
F	87	(Israel) Tomer Levinson	DNP		
Head coach:
(Israel) Oded Kattash

H. Jerusalem	M. Rishon LeZion

Jerusalem	Statistics	Rishon LeZion
22/49 (45%)	2 point field goals	28/46 (61%)
10/30 (33%)	3 point field goals	8/21 (38%)
12/19 (63%)	Free throws	12/26 (46%)
43	Rebounds	48
15	Assists	21
11	Steals	6
9	Turnovers	15
2	Blocks	2

Starters:			Pts	Reb	Ast
G	30	(Israel) Nimrod Tishman	16	2	7
G	20	(United States) Cameron Long	19	4	4
F	14	(Israel) Oz Blayzer	8	4	2
F/C	86	(United States) Darryl Monroe	14	9	3
C	15	(United States) Diamon Simpson	28	20	2
Reserves:					
G/F	11	(Israel) Adam Ariel	6	0	0
G	1	(United States) Alex Hamilton	1	3	3
C	9	(Israel) Itay Segev	0	0	0
F	6	(Israel) Guy Netzer	DNP		
G	13	(Israel) Gregory Kolomoisky	DNP		
G	41	(Israel) Noam Dovrat	DNP		
G	99	(Israel) Tal Peled	DNP		
Head coach:
(Israel) Guy Goodes

== Final ==
June 13, 2019	Maccabi Tel Aviv	89–75	Maccabi Rishon LeZion	Tel Aviv
21:00	Scoring by quarter: 20–13, 24–29, 20–15, 25–18
Sport 5	Pts: DiBartolomeo 15; Rebs: Three players 6 Asts: Three players 3 PIR: Black & Kane 14	Box Score	Pts: Monroe 22; Rebs: Simpson & Tishman 6 Asts: Tishman 4 PIR: Hamilton 22	Arena: Menora Mivtachim Arena; Attendance: 10383; Referees: Sefi Shemesh, Amit Balak, Ori Shalhavi

Starters:			Pts	Reb	Ast
G	1	(United States) Scottie Wilbekin	14	2	1
G	7	(United States) DeAndre Kane	14	4	2
G/F	50	(Israel) Yovel Zoosman	8	6	3
F/C	15	(Israel) Jake Cohen	3	5	3
C	28	(United States) Tarik Black	11	3	2
Reserves:					
G	12	(Israel) John DiBartolomeo	15	0	1
G/F	5	(United States) Michael Roll	10	4	3
F/C	3	(United States) Johnny O'Bryant III	7	6	1
C	9	(Israel) Alex Tyus	7	6	0
F	4	(United States) Angelo Caloiaro	0	1	1
G/F	8	(Israel) Deni Avdija	0	0	0
G	18	(Israel) Dori Sahar	0	0	0
Head coach:
(Greece) Ioannis Sfairopoulos

M. Tel Aviv	M. Rishon LeZion

Tel Aviv	Statistics	Rishon LeZion
20/35 (57%)	2 point field goals	20/39 (51%)
10/28 (36%)	3 point field goals	5/16 (31%)
19/22 (86%)	Free throws	20/30 (67%)
39	Rebounds	28
17	Assists	13
7	Steals	3
11	Turnovers	11
3	Blocks	1

Starters:			Pts	Reb	Ast
G	30	(Israel) Nimrod Tishman	2	6	4
G	20	(United States) Cameron Long	12	0	3
F	14	(Israel) Oz Blayzer	6	3	2
F/C	86	(United States) Darryl Monroe	22	3	1
C	15	(United States) Diamon Simpson	13	6	0
Reserves:					
G	1	(United States) Alex Hamilton	18	3	3
C	9	(Israel) Itay Segev	2	4	0
G/F	11	(Israel) Adam Ariel	0	0	0
F	6	(Israel) Guy Netzer	0	0	0
G	13	(Israel) Gregory Kolomoisky	0	0	0
G	41	(Israel) Noam Dovrat	0	0	0
G	99	(Israel) Tal Peled	0	0	0
Head coach:
(Israel) Guy Goodes

2018–19 Israeli Premier League champions
Maccabi Tel Aviv
53rd title
