= Uri Kokia =

Israeli basketball player and coach

Uri Kokia אורי קוקיה
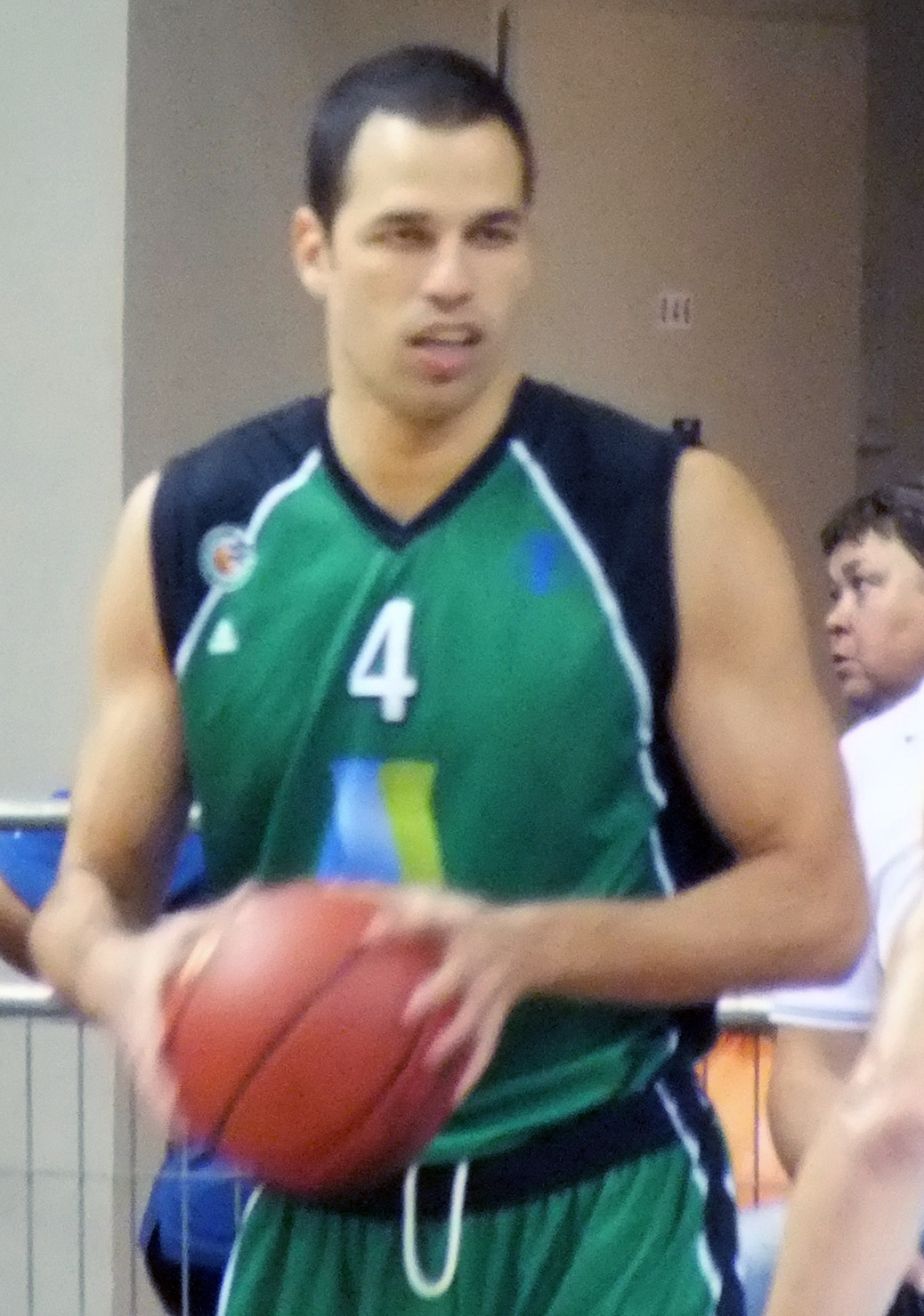
- Kokia with Maccabi Haifa, 2013

Ironi Ramat Gan
- Title: Head coach
- League: Liga Artzit

Personal information
- Born: May 14, 1981 (age 45) Yavne, Israel
- Listed height: 2.03 m (6 ft 8 in)
- Listed weight: 255 lb (116 kg)

Career information
- Playing career: 2000–2019
- Position: Center / power forward
- Coaching career: 2014–present

Career history

Playing
- 2000–2001: Hapoel Tel Aviv
- 2001–2002: Ironi Nahariya
- 2003–2004: Hapoel Galil Elyon
- 2004: Ironi Nahariya
- 2004–2005: Bnei HaSharon
- 2005–2007: Ironi Nahariya
- 2007–2008: Maccabi Haifa
- 2008–2009: Hapoel Holon
- 2009–2013: Hapoel Jerusalem
- 2013–2014: Maccabi Haifa
- 2015: Hapoel Ramat Gan Givatayim
- 2015–2016: Ironi Nahariya
- 2016: Maccabi Kiryat Gat
- 2016–2018: Hapoel Ramat Gan Givatayim
- 2018–2019: Elitzur Yavne
- 2019: Hapoel Ramat Gan Givatayim

Coaching
- 2014–2015: Hapoel Jerusalem (assistant)
- 2019–present: Ironi Ramat Gan

Career highlights
- As player: Israeli National League champion (2008); Israeli State Cup winner (2009); Israeli Premier League Most Improved Player (2009); As coach: Israeli Premier League champion (2015)

Uri Kokia (Hebrew: אורי קוקיה; born May 14, 1981) is an Israeli professional basketball coach and a former professional basketball player. He is the current head coach for Ironi Ramat Gan of the Liga Artzit. Kokia played as a center/power forward position and was a member of the Israel national basketball team. He was named the Israeli Basketball Super League Most Improved Player in 2009. In November 2017, Kokia publicly came out as gay.

== Basketball career ==
Uri Kokia began playing basketball with sport clubs Elitzur Yavneh and Maccabi Rehovot. At 21 years of age, Kokia entered the Premier League, playing for Hapoel Galil Elyon.

He played five seasons for Ironi Nahariya, and has also played for Bnei Hasharon, Maccabi Haifa (after the 2007–08 season), Hapoel Holon, and Hapoel Jerusalem (for whom he was team captain). He was named the Israeli Basketball Super League Most Improved Player in 2009.

In 2010, at the age of 29, Kokia was slated to make his Israel national team debut for the start of the 2011 EuroBasket qualifying campaign. In November 2010, he suffered a torn tendon in his shoulder.

On June 19, 2018, Kokia joined his former team Elitzur Yavne of the Liga Leumit. However, on January 20, 2019, Kokia parted ways with Yavne and joined Hapoel Ramat Gan Givatayim for the rest of the season.

== Coaching career ==
In the 2014/2015 Premier League season he was named Hapoel Jerusalem assistant head coach, he won the team's first championship.

On August 8, 2019, Kokia was named Ironi Ramat Gan new head coach for the 2019–20 season.

== Personal life ==
On November 28, 2017, Kokia came out as gay, becoming the first male professional basketball player in Israel to publicly do so.
