= Sean Daniel (basketball) =

Israeli basketball player

Sean Mcdonough Daniel שון דניאל
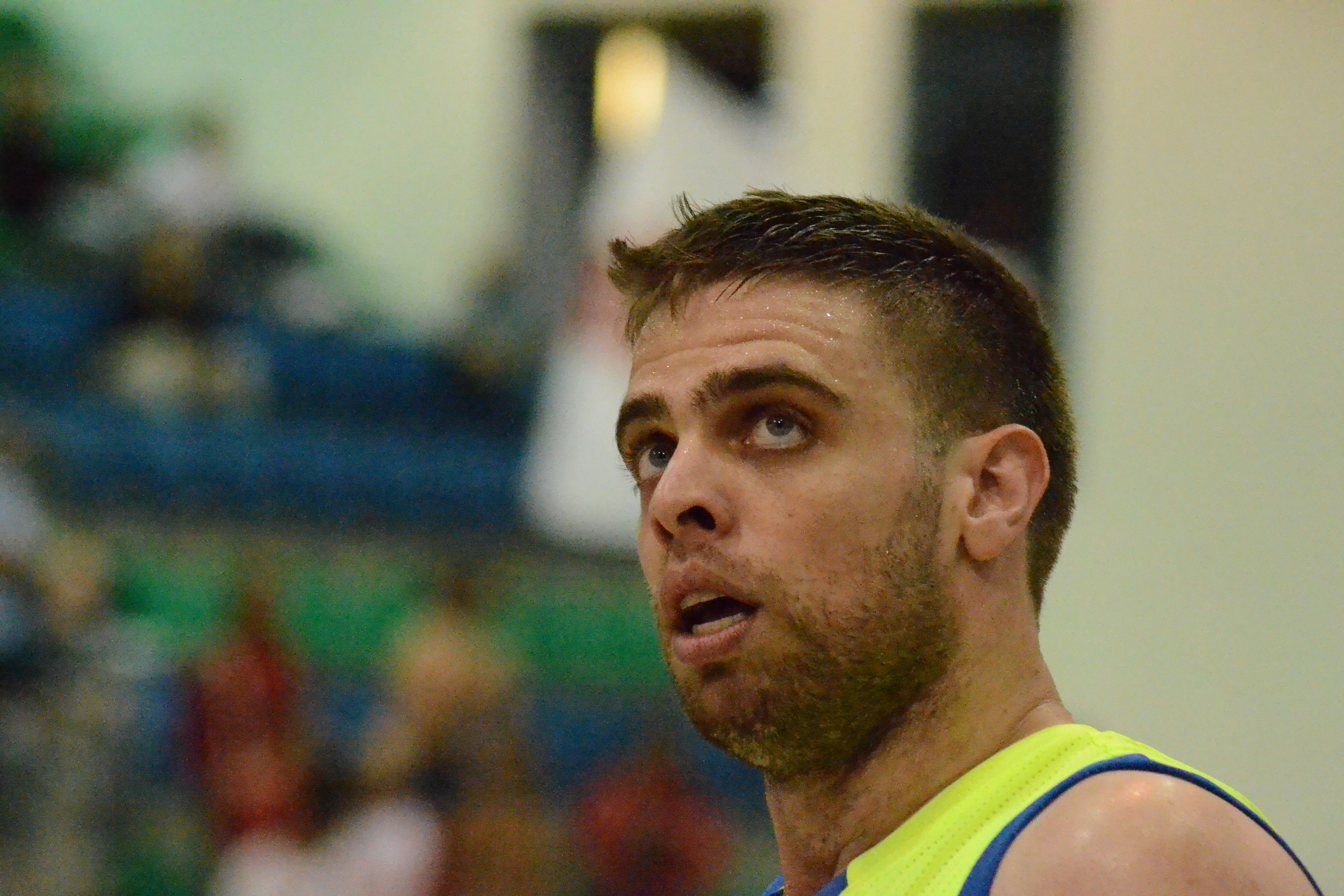

Personal information
- Born: May 4, 1989 (age 37) Ramat Gan, Israel
- Listed height: 6 ft 6 in (1.98 m)
- Position: Small forward

Career highlights
- Israeli Basketball Premier League Most Improved Player (2012)

Sean Mcdonough Daniel (Hebrew: שון דניאל; born May 4, 1989) is an Israeli former professional basketball player. He played the small forward position. He was named the 2012 Israeli Basketball Premier League Most Improved Player.

== Biography ==
Daniel was born in Ramat Gan, Israel. He is 6 ft 6 in (198 cm) tall.

He played in the 2004 FIBA Europe Under-16 Championship and 2005 FIBA Europe Under-16 Championship, 2006 FIBA Europe Under-18 Championship and 2007 FIBA Europe Under-18 Championship, and 2008 FIBA Europe Under-20 Championship and 2009 FIBA Europe Under-18 Championship. Daniel also played in the 2011 Summer Universiade.

Daniel played as a professional for Hapoel Holon and Maccabi Ashdod. He was named the 2012 Israeli Basketball Premier League Most Improved Player.
