= Yam Madar =

Israeli basketball player (born 2000)

Yam Madar ים מדר
- Madar playing for Maccabi Tel Aviv 2026

No. 26 – Maccabi Tel Aviv
- Position: Point guard
- League: Israeli Premier League; EuroLeague

Personal information
- Born: 21 December 2000 (age 25) Beit Dagan, Israel
- Listed height: 1.90 m (6 ft 3 in)
- Listed weight: 82 kg (181 lb)

Career information
- NBA draft: 2020: 2nd round, 47th overall pick
- Drafted by: Boston Celtics
- Playing career: 2018–present

Career history
- 2018–2021: Hapoel Tel Aviv
- 2021–2023: Partizan
- 2023–2024: Fenerbahçe
- 2024: Bayern Munich
- 2024–2026: Hapoel Tel Aviv
- 2026–present: Maccabi Tel Aviv

Career highlights
- EuroLeague Rising Star (2023); EuroCup champion (2025); Turkish League champion (2024); ABA League champion (2023); All-Israeli League Second Team (2021); Israeli League Most Improved Player (2020)
- Stats at Basketball Reference
Medals
Men's basketball
Representing Israel
FIBA U20 European Championship
Gold medal – first place	2019 Israel	Team

Yam Madar (Hebrew: ים מדר; born 21 December 2000) is an Israeli professional basketball player for Maccabi Tel Aviv of the Israeli Premier League and the EuroLeague. He also represents the Israel senior national team internationally.

Madar joined Hapoel Tel Aviv of the Israeli Basketball Premier League in 2018. He debuted for their senior team that year, at age 17, becoming one of the youngest players in club history. Two years later, he became the youngest player to win the Israeli Premier League Most Improved Player award. He won a gold medal for Israel at the youth level, playing at the 2019 FIBA U20 European Championship. Madar also earned a spot in the All-Tournament Team. He was named the 2023 EuroLeague Rising Star.

Madar was selected with the 47th overall pick by the Boston Celtics in the 2020 NBA draft.

== Early life ==
Madar was born and raised in the town of Beit Dagan, Israel, to a family of Mizrahi Jewish (Yemenite-Jewish) descent. His father Zohar Madar is a former mayor of Beit Dagan. In Hebrew, his first name means "sea".

Madar played for Maccabi Beit Dagan and Hapoel Tel Aviv youth teams.

== Professional career ==
=== Hapoel Tel Aviv (2018–2021) ===
On 24 June 2018, Madar signed a four-year deal with Hapoel Tel Aviv. On 21 September 2018, he made his debut in a FIBA Champions League qualifying round match against Spirou Charleroi, playing 15 minutes off the bench. In 2018–19 as a 17-year-old, he played in 34 games (all of them off the bench), but only played 9.9 minutes per game, averaging 2.7 points per game.

In 2019–20 as an 18-year-old, he played in 32 games (starting 17 of them), averaging 24.4 minutes, 10.1 points, 3.4 assists, and 1.0 steals per game, whicle shooting 81% from the free throw line.

On 3 July 2020, Madar recorded a career-high 28 points, shooting 11-of-17 from the field and 3-of-3 from the line in a 106–105 loss to Maccabi Ashdod. In the quarter-finals series versus league leader Maccabi Tel Aviv, Madar was the leading scorer with 17.3 points while shooting 45% from the floor and 89% from the free throw line. He added 5.3 assists, 3.0 rebounds, and 2.0 steals, but despite his performance, Maccabi won 2–1. In Hapoel's only win of the series, he had 22 points, shooting 8-of-16 from the field and 5-of-5 from the line. He added 6 assists and 5 rebounds. In July, Madar was selected as the Israeli Premier League Most Improved Player, becoming the youngest player ever to receive this award.

In 2020–21, playing in the Israeli Basketball Premier League, in 35 games (33 of which were starts) he averaged 32.4 minutes, 17.1 points, 5.2 assists (9th in the league), and 1.3 steals per game, while shooting 41% from three-point range and 83% from the free throw line. In 2021 he was named to the All-League Second Team.

=== Partizan (2021–2023) ===
On 18 August 2021, he signed with Serbian club Partizan of the ABA League. In 2021–22 with Partizan he averaged 18.4 minutes, 7.5 points, 2.4 assists, and 0.8 steals per game, while shooting 41% from three-point range and 83% from the free throw line.

During the 2022–23 season, Madar played in the EuroLeague for the first time. That season Partizan was eliminated by Real Madrid in a tight playoffs series. Over the season, in 76 games Madar averaged 15.8 minutes, 6.6 points, 2.1 assists, and 0.9 steals per game, while shooting 40% from three-point range and 85% from the free throw line. Partizan ended the 2022–23 season by lifting the ABA League championship trophy, after 3–2 score against Crvena zvezda in the Finals series. Madar was named the 2023 EuroLeague Rising Star.

=== Fenerbahçe (2023–2024) ===
On 12 July 2023, Madar signed a two-plus-one-year contract with Turkish club Fenerbahçe. Over the 2023–24 season, in 52 games Madar averaged 18.0 minutes, 6.0 points, and 3.6 assists per game, while shooting 52% from the field, 40% from three-point range, and 83% from the free throw line.

=== Bayern Munich (2024) ===
Madar with Bayern Munich

On 16 July 2024, Madar signed with Bayern Munich of the Basketball Bundesliga and the EuroLeague. In the 2024 season, in 8 games Madar averaged 12.3 minutes, 4.3 points, and 1.8 assists per game. On 28 November of the same year, at his request due to his frustration with his limited playing time, the club granted him his release.

=== Return to Hapoel Tel Aviv (2024–2026) ===
On 28 November 2024, Madar returned to Hapoel Tel Aviv. Over the 2024–25 season, in 12 games Madar averaged 23.2 minutes, 10.9 points, 4.9 assists, and 1.0 steals per game.

On 24 September 2025, Madar underwent surgery for appendicitis and was sidelined for Winner's Cup games.

In 2025–26, in 46 games Madar averaged 20.2 minutes, 10.7 points, 3.4 assists, and 1.1 steals per game, while shooting 39% from three-point range, and 86% from the free throw line.

=== Maccabi Tel Aviv (2026–present) ===
Madar with Maccabi Tel Aviv in 2026

On 12 July 2026, Madar signed a three-year deal with Maccabi Tel Aviv of the Israeli Premier League and the EuroLeague.

=== NBA draft rights ===
Madar was selected with the 47th overall pick in the 2020 NBA draft by the Boston Celtics; however, he continued with Hapoel Tel Aviv for the 2020–21 season. He played for the Celtics in the 2021 NBA summer league, scoring 8 points on 4-6 shooting in 17 minutes at his debut, an 85–83 win against the Atlanta Hawks.

== National team career ==
=== Junior national team ===
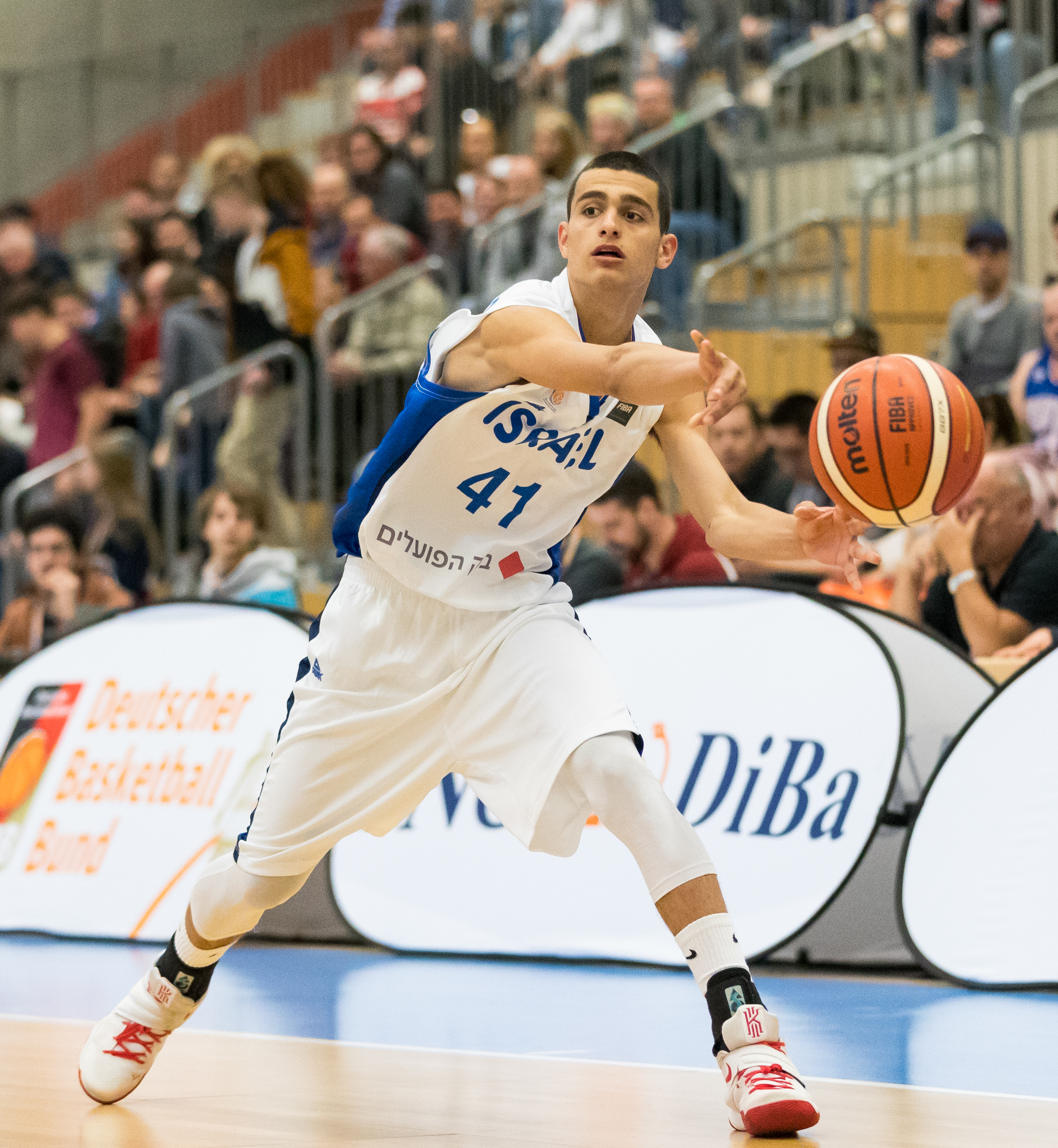
Madar playing for Israel in 2018

In July 2018, Madar played in the 2018 FIBA Europe Under-18 Championship Division B with the Israeli Under-18 team, and averaged 11.4 points, 3.2 rebounds, 3.0 assists, and 1.8 steals per game.

In July 2019, Madar won the 2019 FIBA Europe Under-20 Championship with the Israeli Under-20 team. Madar led the tournament in assists with 7.7 per game, along with 15.9 points, 3.1 rebounds, and 1.4 steals for 19.6 PIR per game, while shooting 52% from the field, 48% from three-point range, and 81% from the free throw line, earning a spot in the All-Tournament Team, alongside his teammate Deni Avdija.

=== Senior national team ===
In February 2019, Madar was named to the Israel senior national basketball team. In 28 games for the team through June 2026, he averaged 25 minutes, 12.3 points, 3.6 assists, and 1.6 steals per game, while shooting 86.7% from the free throw line.

== Career statistics ==
Legend
GP	Games played	GS	Games started	MPG	Minutes per game
FG%	Field-goal percentage	3P%	3-point field-goal percentage	FT%	Free-throw percentage
RPG	Rebounds per game	APG	Assists per game	SPG	Steals per game
BPG	Blocks per game	PPG	Points per game	PIR	Performance index rating
**Bold**	Career high

=== EuroLeague ===
Year	Team	GP	GS	MPG	FG%	3P%	FT%	RPG	APG	SPG	BPG	PPG	PIR
2022–23	Partizan	**38**	**24**	13.4	.453	**.338**	.875	1.2	1.6	.6	**.2**	**5.8**	**5.0**
2023–24	Fenerbahçe	30	4	**13.5**	**.457**	.325	.829	1.2	**2.0**	.6	.1	4.3	4.8
2024–25	Bayern Munich	5	0	11.9	.429	.143	**1.000**	**1.4**	1.6	**.8**	**.2**	4.2	4.6
Career		73	28	13.5	.452	.322	.857	1.2	1.8	.6	.1	5.1	4.9

=== EuroCup ===
Year	Team	GP	GS	MPG	FG%	3P%	FT%	RPG	APG	SPG	BPG	PPG	PIR
2021–22	Partizan	17	4	18.3	.442	.465	.839	2.9	2.8	.6	.1	8.6	9.6
Career		17	4	18.3	.442	.465	.839	2.9	2.8	.6	.1	8.6	9.6

=== Domestic leagues ===
Year	Team	League	GP	MPG	FG%	3P%	FT%	RPG	APG	SPG	BPG	PPG
2018–19	(Israel) Hapoel Tel Aviv	Israeli Basketball Premier League	32	9.7	.427	.250	.731	1.0	1.0	.7	.0	2.8
2019–20	(Israel) Hapoel Tel Aviv	Israeli Basketball Premier League	32	24.4	.444	.267	.812	2.4	3.4	1.0	.2	10.1
2020–21	(Israel) Hapoel Tel Aviv	Israeli Basketball Premier League	30	33.2	.469	.409	.828	3.0	5.2	1.3	.4	17.1
2021–22	(Serbia) Partizan	ABA	33	18.4	.524	.373	.825	2.3	2.1	.8	.3	7.0
2022–23	(Serbia) Partizan	ABA	35	17.6	.503	.482	.833	1.5	2.5	1.1	.2	7.3
2023–24	(Turkey) Fenerbahçe	TBSL	19	24.4	.559	.455	.871	4.3	6.0	1.4	.0	10.7
2024–25	(Germany) Bayern Munich	BBL	8	12.3	.393	.222	1.000	1.6	1.8	.3	.0	4.3

== See also ==
- List of Jews in sports
- List of Israelis
