= Oded Brandwein =

Israeli basketball player (born 1988)

Oded Brandwein עודד ברנדווין
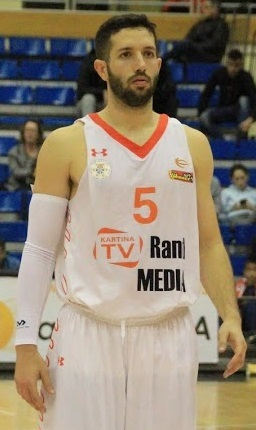
- Brandwein with Rishon LeZion in 2017

Free agent
- Position: Point guard

Personal information
- Born: 15 February 1988 (age 38) Petah Tikva, Israel
- Listed height: 179 cm (5 ft 10 in)

Career information
- Playing career: 2006–present

Career history
- 2006–2007: Bnei Hasharon
- 2007–2008: Elitzur Ramla
- 2008–2009: Maccabi Hod HaSharon
- 2009–2010: Elitzur Ramla
- 2010: Hapoel Afula
- 2010–2011: Elitzur Yavne
- 2011–2012: Kotwica Kołobrzeg
- 2012–2013: Czarni Słupsk
- 2013–2014: AZS Koszalin
- 2014–2015: Hapoel Gilboa Galil
- 2015–2016: Ironi Nahariya
- 2016–2017: Hapoel Tel Aviv
- 2017–2018: Maccabi Rishon LeZion
- 2018: Maccabi Haifa
- 2018–2019: Ironi Nes Ziona
- 2019–2020: Maccabi Ashdod
- 2020–2021: Hapoel Holon
- 2021–2022: Maccabi Tel Aviv
- 2022–2023: Bnei Herzliya

Career highlights
- 2021 Israeli Basketball League Cup winner

Oded David Brandwein (Hebrew: עודד דוד ברנדווין; born 15 February 1988) is an Israeli-Polish professional basketball player who last played for Bnei Herzliya in the Israeli Basketball Premier League.

== Early life ==
Brandwein was born in Petah Tikva, he played for Bnei Hasharon youth team. Brandwein also played for HaYovel, Herzliya high school team and led them to the state finals in 2006.

== Professional career ==
=== Early years (2006–2011) ===
In 2006, Brandwein started his professional career with Bnei Hasharon.

On January 21, 2010, Brandwein signed with Hapoel Afula for the rest of the season.

=== Poland (2011–2014) ===
On September 11, 2011, Brandwein signed with the Polish team Kotwica Kołobrzeg for the 2011–12 season. Brandwein played 37 games for Kotwica and averaged 12.1 points and 4 assists per game.

On June 26, 2012, Brandwein signed with Czarni Słupsk for the 2012–13 season. On December 23, 2012, Brandwein recorded a career-high 31 points, shooting 8-of-13 from the field, along with seven assists in a 94–104 loss to Turów Zgorzelec. Brandwein helped Słupsk reach the 2013 Polish League Playoffs as the sixth seed, but they eventually were eliminated by Zielona Góra in the Quarterfinals.

On July 29, 2013, Brandwein signed with AZS Koszalin for the 2013–14 season.

=== Return to Israel (2014–present) ===
On May 9, 2014, Brandwein signed a two-year deal with the Belgian team Leuven Bears. However, two months later, Brandwein parted ways with Leuven due to financial struggles of the team and signed a one-year deal with Hapoel Gilboa Galil.

==== Ironi Nahariya ====
On August 2, 2015, Brandwein signed with Ironi Nahariya for the 2015–16 season.

==== Hapoel Tel Aviv ====
On September 11, 2016, Brandwein signed a two-month contract with Hapoel Tel Aviv as an injury cover for Raviv Limonad. On January 10, 2017, Brandwein returned to Hapoel Tel Aviv, signing a one-month contract.

==== Maccabi Rishon ====
On March 5, 2017, Brandwein signed with Maccabi Rishon LeZion for the rest of the season. Brandwein helped Rishon LeZion reach the 2017 Israeli League Final Four, where they eventually lost to Hapoel Jerusalem.

On July 9, 2017, Brandwein signed a two-year contract extension with Rishon LeZion. However, on March 28, 2018, Brandwein parted ways with Rishon LeZion to join Maccabi Haifa for the rest of the season as a replacement for Guni Israeli.

==== Ironi Nes Ziona ====
On July 30, 2018, Brandwein signed with Ironi Nes Ziona for the 2018–19 season. In 13 FIBA Europe Cup games played for Nes Ziona, he averaged 8 points and 3.2 assists per game.

==== Maccabi Ashdod ====
On July 30, 2019, Brandwein signed a one-year deal with Maccabi Ashdod. He averaged 4.9 points and 1.7 assists per game. On September 6, 2020, Brandwein signed with Hapoel Holon.

==== Maccabi Tel Aviv ====
On September 16, Brandwein played a pre-season game with Maccabi Tel Aviv B.C., and was later signed a 3–month contract with the team.

== Israel national team ==
Brandwein was a member of the Israeli Under-18 and Under-20 national teams.

== Personal life ==
Brandwein also holds a Polish passport.
