= Israeli Basketball Premier League Most Improved Player =

The Israeli Basketball Premier League Most Improved Player, or Israeli Basketball Super League Most Improved Player, is an award given to the Most Improved Player of each season of the Israeli Basketball Premier League, which is the top-tier level men's professional basketball league in Israel.

== Winners ==
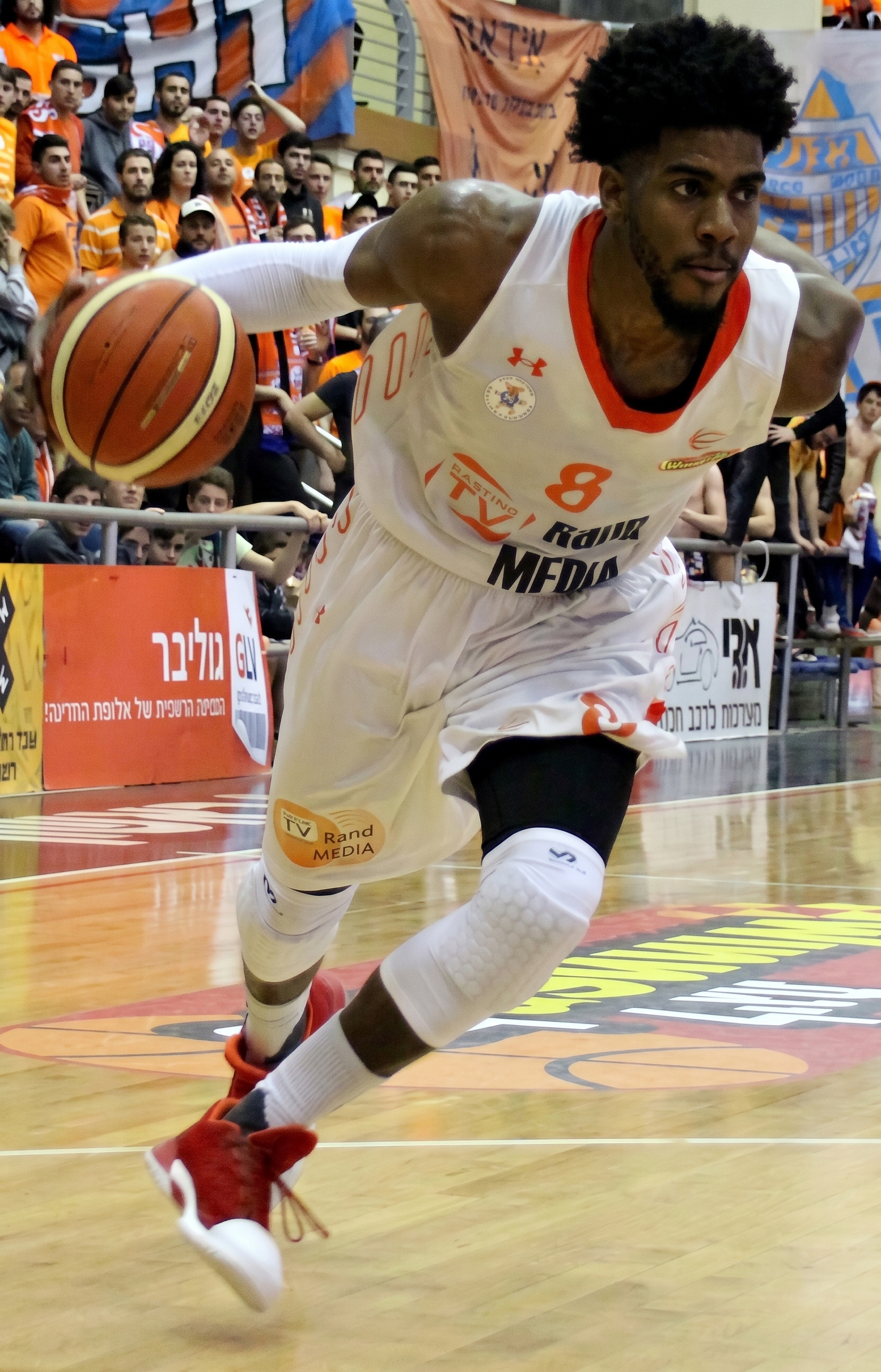
Shawn Dawson

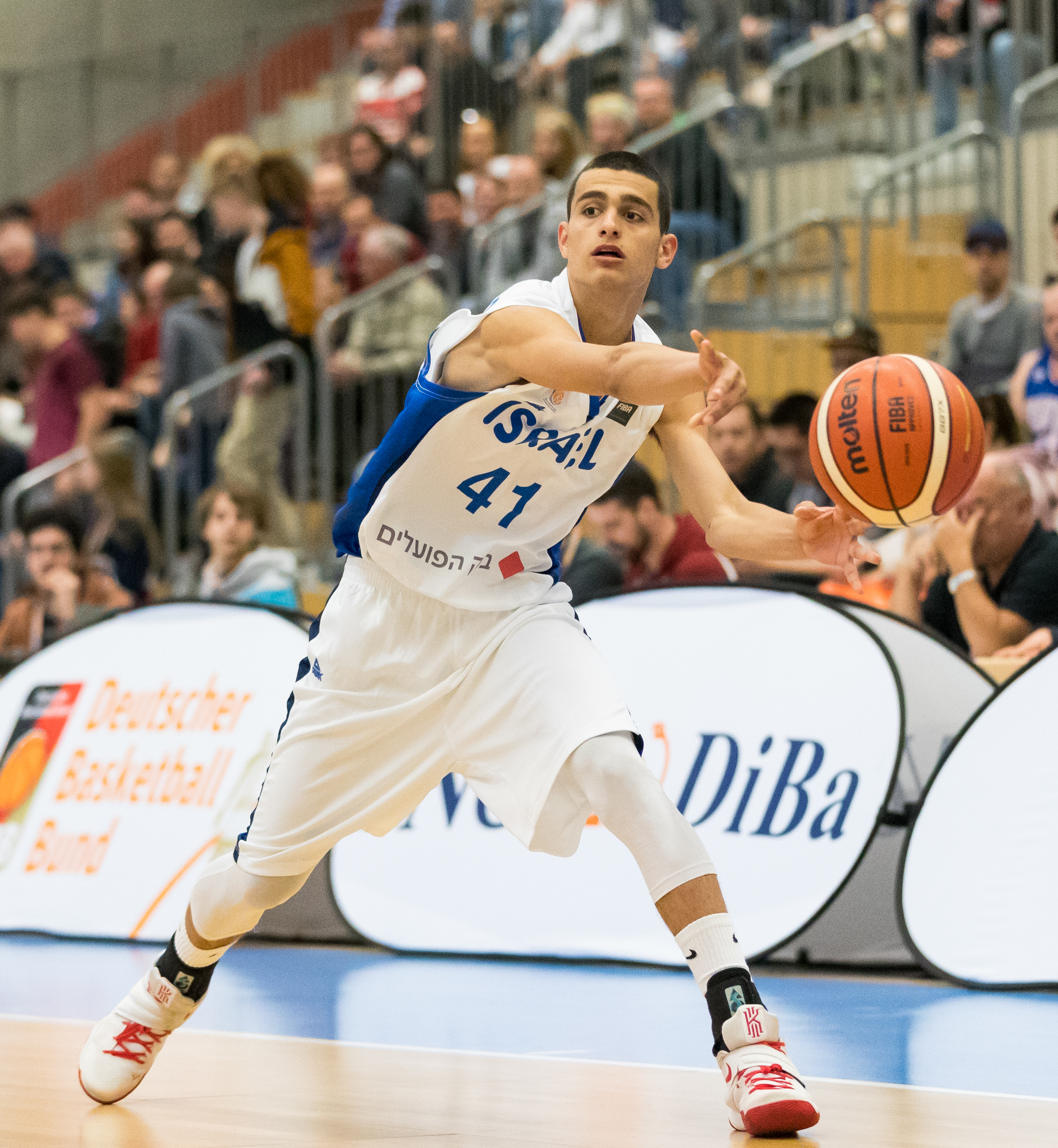
Yam Madar

Season	Most Improved Player	Team
2008–09	(Israel) Uri Kokia	Hapoel Holon
2009–10	Not awarded	
2010–11	(Israel) Nitzan Hanochi	Maccabi Rishon LeZion
2011–12	(Israel) Sean Daniel	Hapoel Holon
2012–13	(Israel) Eyal Shulman	Barak Netanya
2013–14	(Israel) Shawn Dawson	Maccabi Rishon LeZion
2014–15	(Bosnia and Herzegovina) (Israel) (United States) Robert Rothbart	Ironi Nahariya
2015–16	(Israel) Itay Segev	Maccabi Tel Aviv
2016–17	(Israel) Idan Zalmanson	Maccabi Rishon LeZion
2016–17	(Israel) Rafi Menco	Hapoel Eilat
2017–18	(Israel) Nimrod Levi	Maccabi Ashdod
2018–19	(Israel) Netanel Artzi	Hapoel Gilboa Galil
2019–20	(Israel) Yam Madar	Hapoel Tel Aviv
2020–21	(Israel) Noam Dovrat	Maccabi Rishon LeZion
2021–22	(Israel) Michael Brisker	Hapoel Gilboa Galil
2022–23	(Israel) Itay Moskovich	Hapoel Galil Elyon
2023–24	(Israel) Shahar Amir	Hapoel Holon
2024–25	(Israel) Gur Lavy	Hapoel Gilboa Galil
2025–26	(Israel) Yoav Vitlem	Hapoel Be'er Sheva/Dimona
