= SKK Kotwica Kołobrzeg =

Kotwica Kołobrzeg
- Leagues: I Liga
- Founded: 5 August 1946; 80 years ago
- Arena: Millennium Hall
- Capacity: 1,307
- Location: Kołobrzeg, Poland
- Championships: 1 Polish Cup

Stowarzyszenie Koszykówki Kołobrzeskiej Kotwica Kołobrzeg (lit. 'Association of Kołobrzeg Basketball "Kotwica Kołobrzeg"'), commonly known as SKK Kotwica Kołobrzeg or simply Kotwica Kołobrzeg (Polish pronunciation: [kɔˈtfit͡sa kɔˈwɔbʐɛk]), was a Polish basketball team, based in Kołobrzeg.

In the 2004–05 season, Kotwica promoted to the domestic first tier Polish Basketball League (PLK). Their home arena is Hala Millennium. In 2009, the team won the Polish Cup, its first championship. In 2014, the club was declared bankrupt. Consequently, a new club Kotwica 50 Kołobrzeg was found which started in the II Liga, the domestic third tier.

== Honours ==
- Polish Cup
  - Winners (1): 2008–09

== Notable players ==
- Oded Brandwein (born 1988), Israeli-Polish basketball player for Maccabi Tel Aviv of the Euroleague and the Israeli Basketball Premier League
