= Nimrod Levi =

Israeli basketball player (born 1995)

Nimrod Levi נמרוד לוי
No. 15 – Hapoel Jerusalem
- Position: Power forward
- League: Israeli Premier League

Personal information
- Born: March 24, 1995 (age 31) Ramat Gan, Israel
- Listed height: 2.08 m (6 ft 10 in)
- Listed weight: 104 kg (229 lb)

Career information
- NBA draft: 2017: undrafted
- Playing career: 2013–present

Career history
- 2013: Hapoel Kfar Saba/Kohav Yair
- 2013–2014: Maccabi Be'er Yaakov
- 2014–2015: Ironi Ramat Gan
- 2015–2016: Hapoel Galil Elyon
- 2016–2017: Maccabi Rishon LeZion
- 2017: Maccabi Tel Aviv
- 2017–2018: Maccabi Ashdod
- 2018–2019: Maccabi Tel Aviv
- 2019: Maccabi Ashdod
- 2019–2020: Hapoel Jerusalem
- 2020–2021: Ironi Nes Ziona
- 2021–2023: Hapoel Galil Elyon
- 2023–2024: Samsunspor
- 2024–present: Hapoel Jerusalem

Career highlights
- Balkan League Final Four MVP (2022); FIBA Europe Cup champion (2021); Israeli State Cup winner (2020); Israeli League Cup winner (2019); Israeli Basketball Premier League Most Improved Player (2018); 2× Israeli League All-Star (2018–2019)

Nimrod Levi (Hebrew: נמרוד לוי; born March 24, 1995) is an Israeli-Swedish professional basketball player for Hapoel Jerusalem of the Israeli Basketball Premier League. Standing at 6 ft 10 in (2.08 m), he primarily plays at the power forward position. Levi was named the Israeli Basketball Premier League Most Improved Player in 2018.

== Early life ==
Levi was born in Ramat Gan, Israel. He grew up in Modiin and started playing basketball when he was 9 years old. Levi played for Otzma Modiin and Maccabi Tel Aviv youth teams. He joined Wingate Institute Youth Academy in his late teens.

== Professional career ==
=== Early years (2013–2017) ===
In 2013, Levi started his professional career with Hapoel Kfar Saba of the Liga Leumit. Later that season, he joined Maccabi Be'er Yaakov. In 2014, Levi joined Ironi Ramat Gan as part of Maccabi Tel Aviv's youth project, alongside Dragan Bender and Ben Altit.

On August 5, 2015, Levi signed with Hapoel Galil Elyon for the 2015–16 season. In 26 games played for Galil Elyon, Levi averaged 13.9 points, 8 rebounds and 2 assists per game.

On August 13, 2016, Levi signed a three-year deal with Maccabi Rishon LeZion.

However, In March 2017, Levi parted ways with Rishon LeZion to join Maccabi Tel Aviv of the Israeli Basketball Premier League for the remainder of the season. In 2016–17 with Maccabi Tel Aviv, he played in five games, averaging 4.4 minutes and 1.2 points per game.

=== Maccabi Ashdod (2017–2018) ===
On August 6, 2017, Levi signed with Maccabi Ashdod for the 2017–18 season. On January 4, 2018, Levi recorded a season-high 20 points, along with 8 rebounds and 3 steals in a 95–87 win over Bnei Herzliya. On February 1, 2018, Levi was named Israeli Player of the Month for games played in January.

Levi led Ashdod to the 2018 Israeli League Playoffs, where they eventually were eliminated by Hapoel Tel Aviv. In 37 games played for Ashdod, he averaged 10.3 points, 6.4 rebounds and 1.5 assists per game. On June 8, 2018, Levi was named the Israeli Basketball Premier League Most Improved Player.

=== Return to Maccabi Tel Aviv (2018–2019) ===
On July 16, 2018, Levi returned to Maccabi Tel Aviv for a second stint, signing a two-year deal. However, on January 15, 2019, Levi parted ways with Maccabi. In 2018–19 with Maccabi Tel Aviv, he played in five games, averaging 2.2 minutes and 0.6 points per game.

=== Return to Ashdod (2019) ===
On March 1, 2019, Levi returned to Maccabi Ashdod for a second stint, signing for the rest of the season. On May 20, 2019, Levi recorded a career-high 36 points, shooting 15-of-22 from the field, along with seven rebounds and three assists in a 100–89 win over Hapoel Holon. He was subsequently named Israeli League Round 33 MVP. In 2018–19 with the team, he played in 14 games, averaging 33.4 minutes, 15.2 points,7.1 rebounds, and 2.7 assists per game, while shooting 47.8% from the floor.

=== Hapoel Jerusalem (2019–2020) ===
On July 17, 2019, Levi signed a two-year deal with Hapoel Jerusalem. In 2019–20 with the team, he played in 44 games, averaging 18.6 minutes, 7.3 points, 4.4 rebounds, and 0.7 assists per game.

=== Ironi Nes Ziona (2020–2021) ===
On August 12, 2020, Levi signed with Ironi Nes Ziona of the Israeli Premier League. In 2020–21 with the team, he played in 36 games, averaging 23.5 minutes, 10.6 points, 6.0 rebounds, and 1.7 assists per game, while shooting 47.5% from the floor.

=== Hapoel Galil Elyon (2021–2023) ===
On August 5, 2021, he signed with Hapoel Galil Elyon of the Israeli Premier League. In 2021–22 with the team, he played in 41 games, averaging 26.9 minutes, 13.4 points, 6.8 rebounds, and 1.5 assists per game, while shooting 47.4% from the floor. He was named Israeli BSL 1st Team 2022, and 2022 Israeli BSL MVP.

In 2022–23 with the team, he played in 34 games, averaging 28.9 minutes, 12.9 points, 7.2 rebounds, and 1.8 assists per game, while shooting 45.1% from the floor. He was named 2023 Israeli BSL 2nd Team.

=== Samsunspor (2023–2024) ===
On July 26, 2023, he signed with Reeder Samsunspor of the Turkish Basketbol Süper Ligi (BSL). In 2023–24 with the team, he played in 20 games, averaging 29.0 minutes, 12.2 points (4th in the league), 5.6 rebounds (4th), and 1.4 assists per game. He was named the Balkan BIBL Final Four MVP.

=== Return to Hapoel Jerusalem (2024–present) ===
On February 17, 2024, he signed with Hapoel Jerusalem of the Israeli Basketball Premier League. In the 2023–24 season with the team, he played in 10 games, averaging 16.4 minutes, 4.3 points, 3.5 rebounds, and 1.2 assists per game.

In 2024–25 with the team, he played in 13 games, averaging 17.1 minutes, 7.0 points, 3.6 rebounds, and 1.4 assists per game, while shooting 47.3% from the floor.

In 2025–26 with the team, he played in 37 games, averaging 18.1 minutes, 7.5 points, 3.6 rebounds, and 1.4 assists per game, while shooting 47.3% from the floor and 40.8% from three-point range.

== National team career ==
Levi is a member of the Israeli national basketball team. On February 23, 2018, He made his first appearance for the senior team at the 2019 FIBA Basketball World Cup qualification match against Great Britain.

Levi was also a member of the Israeli Under-18 and Under-20 national teams.

== Career statistics ==
Legend
GP	Games played	GS	Games started	MPG	Minutes per game
FG%	Field-goal percentage	3P%	3-point field-goal percentage	FT%	Free-throw percentage
RPG	Rebounds per game	APG	Assists per game	SPG	Steals per game
BPG	Blocks per game	PPG	Points per game	PIR	Performance index rating
**Bold**	Career high

=== EuroLeague ===
Year	Team	GP	GS	MPG	FG%	3P%	FT%	RPG	APG	SPG	BPG	PPG	PIR
2016–17	Maccabi	5	0	4.3	.666	.750	.0	.6	.0	.0	.0	2.2	1.4
2018–19	Maccabi	5	0	2.3	.500	1.000	.0	.2	.0	.0	.0	.6	.4
Career		10	0	4.3	.625	.800	.0	.4	.0	.0	0	1.4	.9
