= John DiBartolomeo =

American-Israeli basketball player

John DiBartolomeo ג'ון דיברתולומיאו
- DiBartolomeo with Maccabi Tel Aviv in 2022

No. 12 – Maccabi Tel Aviv
- Position: Shooting guard / point guard
- League: Israeli Basketball Premier League; EuroLeague

Personal information
- Born: June 20, 1991 (age 35) New York City, New York, U.S.
- Listed height: 6 ft 0 in (1.83 m)
- Listed weight: 175 lb (79 kg)

Career information
- High school: Staples (Westport, Connecticut)
- College: Rochester (2009–2013)
- NBA draft: 2013: undrafted
- Playing career: 2013–present

Career history
- 2013–2015: Zaragoza
- 2013–2015: → Palma Air Europa
- 2015–2017: Maccabi Haifa
- 2017–present: Maccabi Tel Aviv

Career highlights
- 7× Israeli League champion (2018–2021, 2023, 2024, 2026); Israeli League Final Four MVP (2019); Israeli League Regular Season MVP (2017); Israeli League Cup winner (2017); Israeli League Cup MVP (2017); 2× All-Israeli League First Team (2017, 2019); All-Israeli League Second Team (2018); EuroLeague Free Throw Percentage leader (2023); ECAC Division III Upstate Player of the Year (2013); First-team ECAC Division III Upstate (2013)

John DiBartolomeo (Hebrew: ג'ון דיברתולומיאו; born June 20, 1991) is an Israeli–American professional basketball player and the team captain for Maccabi Tel Aviv of the Israeli Basketball Premier League and the EuroLeague. He played college basketball at the University of Rochester, where he starred in his four seasons with the Yellow Jackets, and was dubbed "one of the best players in the University of Rochester men's basketball history". DiBartolomeo played professional basketball in Spain and Israel, where he was named the Israeli League Regular Season MVP and Israeli League Cup MVP in 2017 and the Israeli League Final Four MVP in 2019.

== Early life ==
DiBartolomeo was born in New York, to an Italian Catholic father, and a Russian-Jewish mother. He grew up in Westport, Connecticut.

He attended Staples High School in Westport, where playing basketball as a junior he was second team All-Conference and Connecticut Post Honorable Mention. As a senior he averaged 20 points a game, and was named first team All-Conference.

== College career ==
DiBartolomeo played college basketball for the University of Rochester Yellowjackets, in the University Athletic Association (UAA), in NCAA Division 3. As a freshman in 2009–10, he led the UAA with 56 steals. He was named UAA Rookie of the Year, and Second Team All-UAA.

As a sophomore in 2010–11, he led the UAA in scoring (17.7 points per game), and was 2nd in assists (5.7 per game). He was named UAA Player of the Year, First Team All-UAA, and National Association of Basketball Coaches (NABC) All-American.

As a junior in 2011–12, he was 2nd in the UAA in scoring (19.1 points per game), 2nd in assists (145), 1st in steals (56), and 3rd in free throw percentage (89.0%). He was named All-UAA First Team, and DIII News All-American.

As a senior in 2012–13, he set career highs in scoring (22.6 points per game; top 10 in NCAA Division III), 3-point shooting (45.8%), and free throw shooting (90.8%; top 10 in NCAA Division III). He was named a consensus 1st Team All-American. He was also named UAA Player of the Year, Eastern College Athletic Conference Upstate NY Player of the Year, and East Region Player of the Year by D3hoops.com. He was named the 2013 D3hoops.com and 2013 DIII News Player of the Year, while earning spots on the NABC, D3hoops.com, DIII News, United States Basketball Writers Association All-America First Teams. He also garnered Rochester's Louis Alexander Alumni Award and was named Paychex Local Male College Athlete of the Year, which was presented by the Rochester Press Radio Club.

DiBartolomeo averaged 17.8 points per game during his four-year college basketball career, scoring 1,779 career points, which ranked him third in the school's history. His 533 career assists and 201 career steals were second on Rochester's all-time list.

Reflecting on DiBartolomeo's college career, Rochester head coach, Luke Flockerzi, stated in October 2015: "John was truly a special player for us at Rochester. He is simply the hardest-working and most-dedicated player I’ve ever coached. His humility drives him, and has created a work ethic that is unmatched."

== Professional career ==
=== Palma Air Europa (2013–2015) ===
In August 2013, DiBartolomeo signed a three-year deal with the Spanish club CAI Zaragoza. He was later loaned by Zaragoza to Palma Air Europa of the LEB Plata (Spanish 3rd Division), for the 2013–14 season. In 33 games played with Palma, in the 2013–14 season, he averaged 15.1 points (2nd in the league), 3.6 rebounds, 4.7 assists (2nd), and 1.5 steals per game (8th), with an .868 free throw percentage (4th) and a .422 shooting percentage from three-point range (9th).

He returned to Palma for the 2014–15 season, after helping the club earn a league promotion to the LEB Oro (Spanish 2nd Division). In 28 games played with Palma, in the 2014–15 season, he averaged 11.3 points, 4.1 rebounds, 2.3 assists, and 1.6 steals per game (6th in the league), as he was 3rd in the league in free throw percentage (.890).

=== Maccabi Haifa (2015–2017) ===
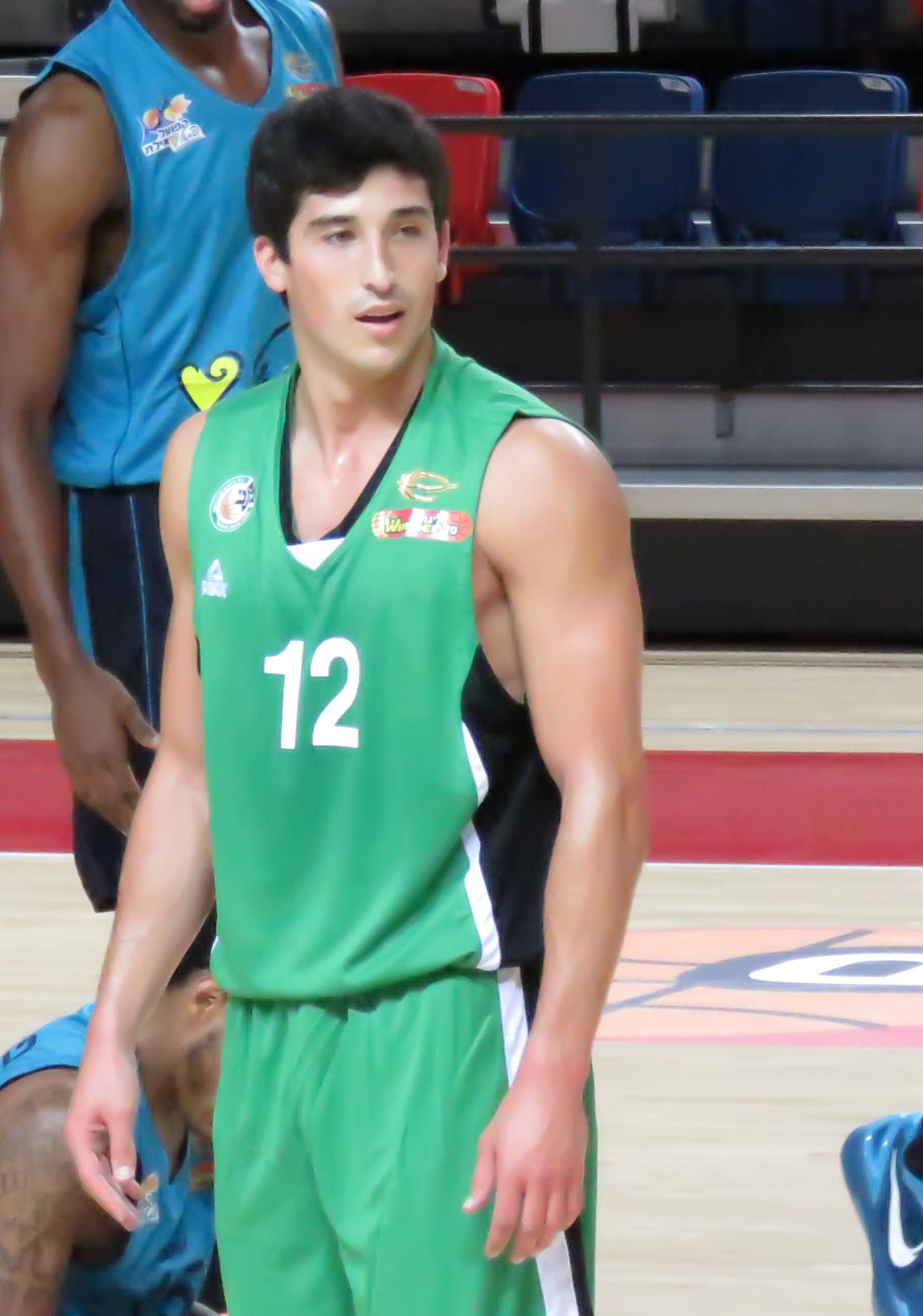
DiBartolomeo with Maccabi Haifa in September 2015

On June 17, 2015, DiBartolomeo signed a two-year deal with the Israeli team Maccabi Haifa. after his contract with Zaragoza, who still owned his rights, was bought out. On February 6, 2016, DiBartolomeo recorded a season-high 22 points in a 91–56 win over Israeli powerhouse Maccabi Tel Aviv. DiBartolomeo, who made 5/7 shots from 3-point territory, was elected co-MVP of the game, alongside his teammate Gregory Vargas.

On December 25, 2016, DiBartolomeo recorded a career-high 35 points, shooting 11-of-14 from the field, along with 7 rebounds and 5 steals in a 93–85 win over Hapoel Eilat. He was subsequently named Israeli League Round 11 MVP. In 2016–17, he averaged 11.0 points, 3.9 rebounds and 3.0 assists a game in regular season, before stepping up in the playoffs, where he tallied 19.2 points, 3.5 boards and 3.0 assists per contest, steering Maccabi Haifa to the championship game. Despite falling short to Hapoel Jerusalem in the title game, DiBartolomeo was named Israeli League MVP for the 2016–17 season.

=== Maccabi Tel Aviv (2017–present) ===
==== 2017–18 season ====
On June 21, 2017, DiBartolomeo signed a three-year deal with Maccabi Tel Aviv. On October 5, 2017, DiBartolomeo led Maccabi to win the 2017 Israeli League Cup by averaging 15.3 points, 5 assists, 1.6 rebounds and 1.6 steals per game. DiBartolomeo was named the Tournament MVP. On January 22, 2018, DiBartolomeo was named Maccabi's team captain, replacing Itay Segev. On June 8, 2018, DiBartolomeo earned a spot in the All-Israeli League Second Team. DiBartolomeo won the 2018 Israeli League Championship title with Maccabi.

==== 2018–19 season ====
On October 22, 2018, DiBartolomeo recorded a season-high 22 points, shooting 6-of-13 from the field, along with seven rebounds and two assists in a 66–64 win over Hapoel Be'er Sheva. On November 1, 2018, DiBartolomeo was named Israeli League Player of the Month after averaging 17.3 points, 4.8 rebounds, 2.8 assists and 1.5 steals in four games played in October. On June 13, 2019, DiBartolomeo led Maccabi to their 53rd Israeli League title after defeating Maccabi Rishon LeZion 89–75 in the final. He scored 15 points by playing 18 minutes off the bench and was named the Final Four MVP.

==== 2019–20 season ====
On November 7, 2019, DiBartolomeo recorded a EuroLeague career-high 19 points, shooting 6-of-8 from the field, along with three steals in a 104–78 win over Alba Berlin. On December 5, 2019, DiBartolomeo was ruled out for six months after he suffered from a pectoral muscle tear in a game against Bayern Munich. He suffered a season-ending Achilles injury on June 9, 2020. The injury was less severe than initially expected as there was no tear, and he is expected to be back for the next season.

==== 2020–21 season ====
On August 13, 2020, DiBartolomeo officially signed a two-year contract extension with an option for a third year. He won his fourth straight Israeli championship with Maccabi.

== National team career ==
DiBartolomeo is a member of the senior Israel national basketball team. On September 6, 2018, he made his first appearance for the Israeli team in a 91–73 win over Russia, recording 12 points off the bench.

== Career statistics ==
Legend
GP	Games played	GS	Games started	MPG	Minutes per game
FG%	Field-goal percentage	3P%	3-point field-goal percentage	FT%	Free-throw percentage
RPG	Rebounds per game	APG	Assists per game	SPG	Steals per game
BPG	Blocks per game	PPG	Points per game	PIR	Performance index rating
**Bold**	Career high

=== EuroLeague ===
*	Led the league

Year	Team	GP	GS	MPG	FG%	3P%	FT%	RPG	APG	SPG	BPG	PPG	PIR
2017–18	Maccabi Tel Aviv	28	6	12.8	.326	.286	.808	1.6	1.4	.5	.0	3.3	3.0
2018–19	Maccabi Tel Aviv	29	2	10.3	.361	.344	.810	1.4	1.1	.4	.0	4.7	4.1
2019–20	Maccabi Tel Aviv	12	0	13.5	**.500**	**.471**	.947	1.0	**1.7**	**.8**	—	**7.8**	**7.2**
2020–21	Maccabi Tel Aviv	23	3	10.4	.415	.375	.938	1.0	1.0	.6	**.1**	3.8	4.3
2021–22	Maccabi Tel Aviv	30	0	13.2	.359	.324	.900	1.2	1.2	.7	.0	3.9	3.3
2022–23	Maccabi Tel Aviv	**39**	1	**16.9**	.412	.417	.982*	1.9	1.1	**.8**	—	6.2	6.4
2023–24	Maccabi Tel Aviv	29	**8**	14.8	.394	.393	**1.000**	**2.0**	1.1	.7	—	4.8	5.5
Career		190	20	13.4	.390	.373	.921	1.5	1.2	.7	.0	4.8	4.7

=== Domestic leagues ===
Year	Team	League	GP	MPG	FG%	3P%	FT%	RPG	APG	SPG	BPG	PPG
2013–14	(Spain) Palma	LEB Plata	33	31.2	.474	.422	.868	3.6	4.7	1.5	.1	15.1
2014–15	(Spain) Palma	LEB Oro	29	27.4	.408	.398	.890	4.1	2.3	1.6	.0	11.4
2015–16	(Israel) Maccabi Haifa	Ligat HaAl	37	26.2	.405	.368	.695	3.3	2.5	2.0	—	9.5
2016–17	(Israel) Maccabi Haifa	Ligat HaAl	33	28.0	.493	.435	.901	3.8	3.0	1.7	.1	12.5
2017–18	(Israel) Maccabi Tel Aviv	Ligat HaAl	34	26.7	.469	.435	.803	3.3	2.5	1.5	.1	10.2
2018–19	(Israel) Maccabi Tel Aviv	Ligat HaAl	37	22.4	.433	.354	.890	3.1	2.8	1.3	.1	11.5
2019–20	(Israel) Maccabi Tel Aviv	Ligat HaAl	8	21.8	.412	.333	1.000	2.9	2.9	1.7	—	7.9
2020–21	(Israel) Maccabi Tel Aviv	Ligat HaAl	34	17.3	.339	.310	.897	2.2	2.2	.8	.0	5.6
2021–22	(Israel) Maccabi Tel Aviv	Ligat HaAl	32	18.7	.418	.392	.872	2.5	2.1	.8	.1	7.2
2022–23	(Israel) Maccabi Tel Aviv	Ligat HaAl	34	21.1	.390	.364	.818	2.8	2.1	1.0	—	7.8
2023–24	(Israel) Maccabi Tel Aviv	Ligat HaAl	29	21.4	.500	.471	.829	3.2	1.5	1.0	—	8.6

=== College ===
Year	Team	GP	GS	MPG	FG%	3P%	FT%	RPG	APG	SPG	BPG	PPG
2009–10	Rochester	25	25	XX.X	.449	.343	.813	2.8	4.6	**2.2**	**.4**	11.4
2010–11	Rochester	23	22	XX.X	**.477**	.361	.816	4.6	**5.9**	1.6	.2	18.5
2011–12	Rochester	25	25	**34.6**	.472	.370	.890	5.0	5.8	**2.2**	**.4**	19.1
2012–13	Rochester	**27**	**27**	33.9	.461	**.458**	**.908**	**5.7**	5.3	2.0	**.4**	**22.6**
Career		100	99	XX.X	.465	.383	.857	4.5	5.4	2.0	.3	17.9
