= Bryon Allen =

Canadian basketball player (born 1992)

No. 2 – Shabab Al Ahli
- Position: Point guard / shooting guard
- League: UAE National Basketball League

Personal information
- Born: May 1, 1992 (age 34) Upper Marlboro, Maryland, U.S.
- Listed height: 191 cm (6 ft 3 in)
- Listed weight: 92 kg (203 lb)

Career information
- High school: St. Thomas More (Oakdale, Connecticut)
- College: George Mason (2010–2014)
- NBA draft: 2014: undrafted
- Playing career: 2014–present

Career history
- 2014–2015: Start Lublin
- 2015: Qadsia
- 2015–2016: Roseto Sharks
- 2016–2017: ČEZ Nymburk
- 2017: EWE Baskets Oldenburg
- 2017–2018: Pınar Karşıyaka
- 2018: Basket Brescia Leonessa
- 2018–2019: Pallacanestro Reggiana
- 2019–2020: Zadar
- 2020–2021: Löwen Braunschweig
- 2021: Studentski centar
- 2021–2022: Hapoel Eilat
- 2022: Parma Basket
- 2023: Beijing Royal Fighters
- 2023: Osos de Manatí
- 2023–2024: Nizhny Novgorod
- 2024: Atléticos de San Germán
- 2024: Leones de Ponce
- 2024–2025: Valtur Brindisi
- 2025: Gambusinos de Fresnillo
- 2025–present: Shabab Al Ahli

Career highlights
- ABA League Second Division champion (2021); Czech League champion (2017); Czech Cup winner (2017); Croatian Cup winner (2020)

Bryon Allen (born May 1, 1992) is an American professional basketball player for Shabab Al Ahli of the UAE National Basketball League. Allen played college basketball for the George Mason Patriots from 2010 until 2014.

== Professional career ==
On August 14, 2016, Allen signed with ČEZ Basketball Nymburk of the Czech NBL. He averaged 13.9 points and 3.1 assists over 42 NBL games.

On June 18, 2017, Allen signed with EWE Baskets Oldenburg of the German Basketball Bundesliga. On December 12, 2017, he parted ways with Oldenburg. Four days later, he signed with Turkish club Pınar Karşıyaka.

On June 30, 2018, Allen signed with the Italian club Basket Brescia Leonessa.

On December 20, 2018, Allen signed with Pallacanestro Reggiana.

On August 14, 2019, Allen signed with KK Zadar. He averaged 18 points per game. On October 9, 2020, Allen signed with Basketball Löwen Braunschweig of the German Basketball Bundesliga.

In February 2021, Allen signed for Studentski centar.

On August 2, 2021, Allen signed with Hapoel Eilat of the Israeli Basketball Premier League.

In summer 2022, he signed with Parma Basket of the VTB United League.

On January 29, 2024, Allen signed with the Atléticos de San Germán.

On June 30, 2024, he signed with Valtur Brindisi of the Serie A2.
