= Idan Zalmanson =

Israeli basketball player (born 1995)

Idan Zalmanson עידן זלמנסון
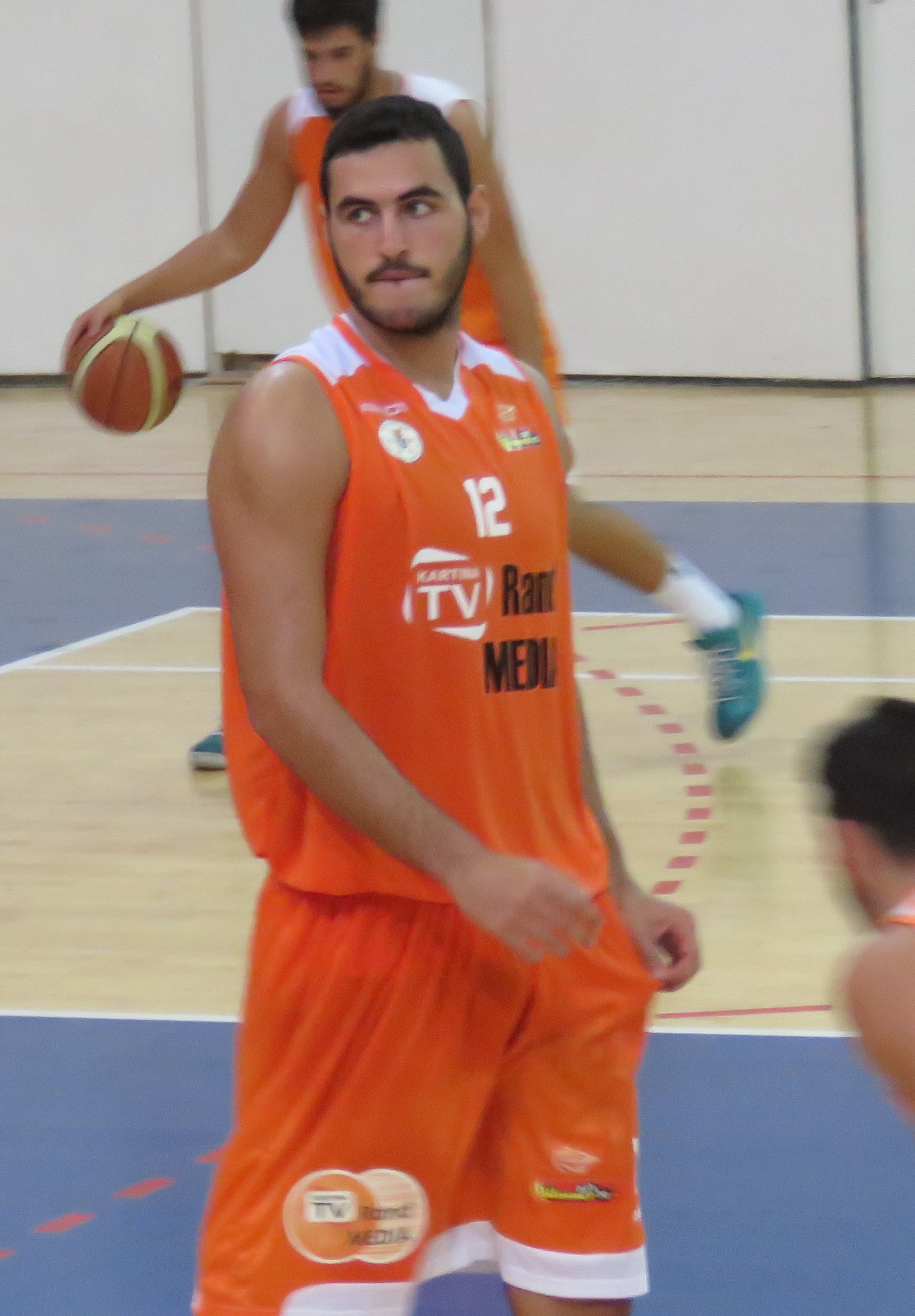
- Zalmanson with Rishon LeZion in 2015

No. 20 – Maccabi Rishon LeZion
- Position: Center
- League: Israeli Basketball Premier League

Personal information
- Born: April 18, 1995 (age 31) Be'er Ya'akov, Israel
- Listed height: 2.06 m (6 ft 9 in)
- Listed weight: 113 kg (249 lb)

Career information
- Playing career: 2011–present

Career history
- 2011–2013: Maccabi Tel Aviv
- 2013–2015: Bnei Herzliya
- 2015–2018: Maccabi Rishon LeZion
- 2018–2019: Hapoel Eilat
- 2019–2021: Hapoel Jerusalem
- 2021–2024: Hapoel Tel Aviv
- 2024–2026: Hapoel Holon
- 2026–present: Maccabi Rishon LeZion

Career highlights
- 2× Israeli League champion (2012, 2016); Adriatic League champion (2012); 3× Israeli State Cup winner (2012–2013, 2020); Israeli League Cup winner (2019); Israeli Basketball Super League Most Improved Player (2017)

Idan Zalmanson (Hebrew: עידן זלמנסון; born April 18, 1995) is an Israeli professional basketball player for Maccabi Rishon LeZion of the Israeli Basketball Premier League. He was named the Israeli Basketball Premier League Most Improved Player in 2017.

== Early life ==
Zalmonson was born in Be'er Ya'akov. At the age of 3 his family moved to Rishon LeZion. He played for Maccabi Rishon LeZion and Maccabi Tel Aviv youth teams.

== Professional career ==
=== Early years (2011–2015) ===
In 2011, Zalmanson started his professional career with Maccabi Tel Aviv. He was part of the roster that won the 2012 Israeli League championship, the 2012 Adriatic League championship and the Israeli State Cup both in 2012 and 2013.

On August 6, 2013, Zalmanson signed a four-year deal with Bnei Herzliya.

=== Maccabi Rishon LeZion (2015–2018) ===
On July 20, 2015, Zalmanson parted ways with Bnei Herzliya to join Maccabi Rishon LeZion, signing a three-year deal. In his first season with Rishon LeZion, he helped them to win the 2016 Israeli League championship as a backup center for Darryl Monroe.

On May 12, 2017, Zalmanson recorded a career-high 24 points, shooting 9-of-11 from the field, along with 7 rebounds and 2 steals in a 79–91 loss to Hapoel Holon. Zalmanson finished his second season with Rishon LeZion averaging 7.8 points and 4 rebounds per game. On June 6, 2017, Zalmanson was named co-Israeli Basketball Premier League Most Improved Player, alongside Rafi Menco.

=== Hapoel Eilat (2018–2019) ===
On July 13, 2018, Zalmanson signed with Hapoel Eilat for the 2018–19 season. In 38 games played for Eilat, he averaged 8.5 points, 3.3 rebounds and 1.5 assists per game. Zalmanson helped Eilat reach the 2019 Israeli League Final Four, where they eventually lost to Maccabi Tel Aviv.

=== Hapoel Jerusalem (2019–2021) ===
On July 14, 2019, Zalmanson signed a two-year deal with Hapoel Jerusalem.

=== Hapoel Tel Aviv (2021–2024) ===
On July 19, 2021, Zalmanson signed a two-year deal with Hapoel Tel Aviv.

=== Hapoel Holon (2024–present) ===
On July 14, 2024, he signed with Hapoel Holon of the Israeli Basketball Premier League.

== Israel national team ==
Zalmanson played for the Israeli national team at the 2017 Eurobasket tournament.

Zalmanson was also a member of the Israeli Under-16, Under-18 and Under-20 national teams.
