= Netanel Artzi =

Israeli basketball player (born 1997)

Netanel Artzi נתנאל ארצי
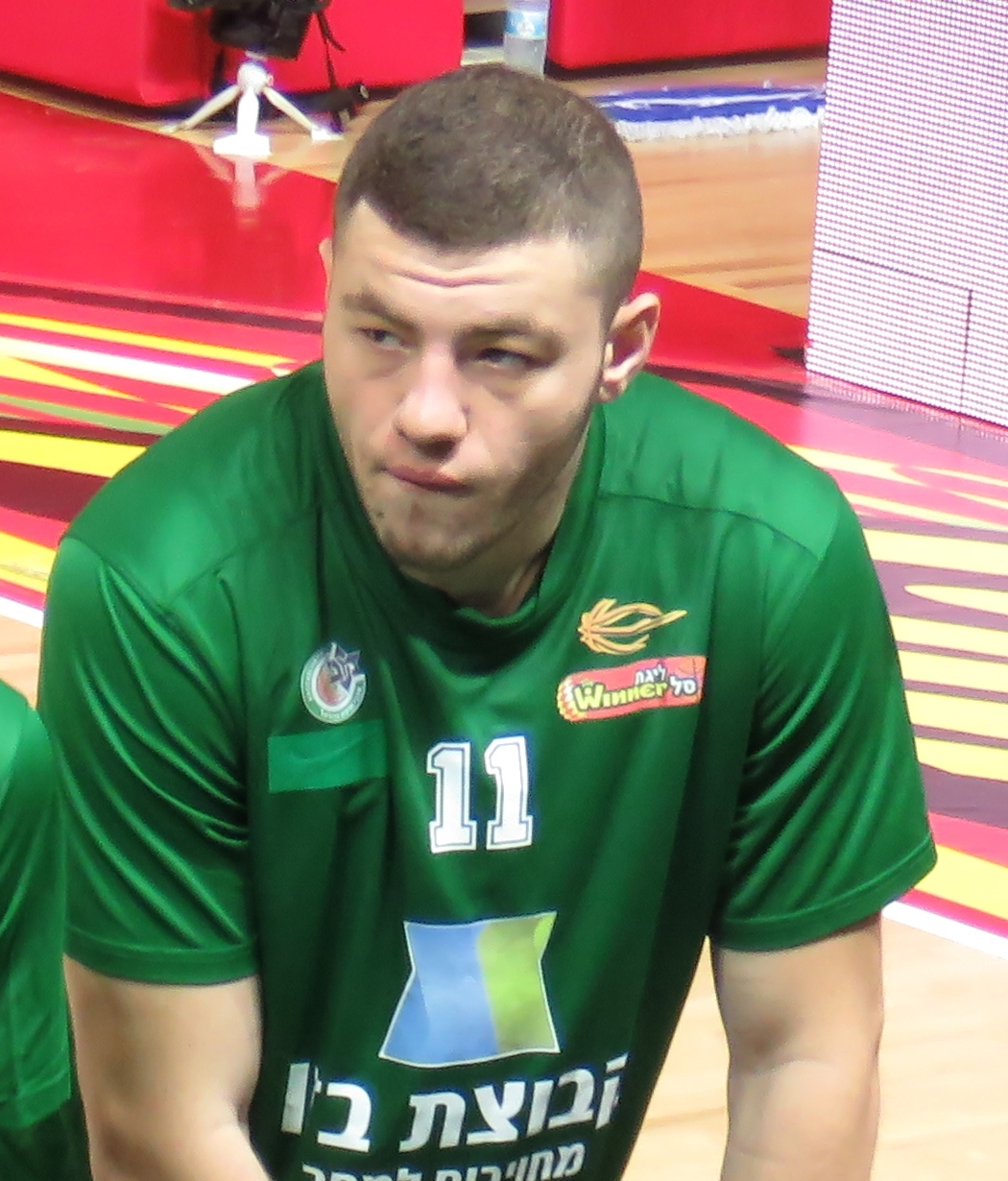
- Artzi with Maccabi Haifa in 2015

No. 21 – Hapoel Holon
- Position: Small forward
- League: Israeli Basketball Premier League

Personal information
- Born: March 21, 1997 (age 29) Kiryat Bialik, Israel
- Listed height: 1.97 m (6 ft 6 in)
- Listed weight: 95 kg (209 lb)

Career information
- Playing career: 2014–present

Career history
- 2014–2018: Maccabi Haifa
- 2015–2016: →Maccabi Hod HaSharon
- 2016–2017: →Hapoel Afula
- 2017–2018: →Maccabi Ashdod
- 2018–2021: Hapoel Gilboa Galil
- 2021–2022: Maccabi Rishon LeZion
- 2022–2023: Hapoel Eilat
- 2023–present: Hapoel Holon

Career highlights
- Israeli League Most Improved Player (2019)
Medals
Representing Israel
Men's basketball
FIBA Europe Under-20
Silver medal – second place	2017 Greece	National Team

Netanel Artzi (Hebrew: נתנאל ארצי; born March 21, 1997) is an Israeli professional basketball player for Hapoel Holon of the Israeli Basketball Premier League. Standing at 1.97 m (6'6"), he primarily plays at the small forward position. Artzi was named the Israeli Basketball Premier League Most Improved Player in 2019.

== Early life ==
Artzi was born and raised in Kiryat Bialik, Israel. He played basketball for Maccabi Haifa and Wingate Institute Academy youth teams. In July 2011, Artzi won the Telma's Next Basketball Champion of Israel contest, he got praised for his performance by NBA player Omri Casspi.

== Professional career ==
=== Early years (2014–2018) ===
In November 2014, Artzi started his professional career with Maccabi Haifa, signing a four-year deal. On November 8, 2015, Artzi made his professional debut in a match against Bnei Herzliya. On March 3, 2015, Artzi participated in the Slam Dunk Contest during the 2015 Israeli League All-Star Event.

On August 25, 2016, Artzi was loaned to Hapoel Afula of the Liga Leumit as part of a two-way contract. In 19 games played for Afula, he averaged 7.5 points and 3.4 rebounds per game.

On November 27, 2017, Artzi was loaned to Maccabi Ashdod for the rest of the season. Artzi helped Ashdod to reach the 2018 Israeli League Playoffs as the fourth seed, but they eventually were eliminated by Hapoel Tel Aviv in the Quarterfinals.

=== Hapoel Gilboa Galil (2018–2021) ===
On July 20, 2018, Artzi signed a three-year deal with Hapoel Gilboa Galil. On March 18, 2019, Artzi recorded a career-high 17 points, shooting 7-of-12 from the field, along with five rebounds in a 92–77 win over Maccabi Rishon LeZion. In 33 games played during the 2018–19 season, he averaged 7.5 points and 3.1 rebounds per game. On June 7, 2019, Artzi was named the Israeli Basketball Premier League Most Improved Player.

=== Maccabi Rishon LeZion (2021–2022) ===
On July 12, 2021, he has signed with Maccabi Rishon LeZion of the Israeli Basketball Premier League.

=== Hapoel Eilat (2022–2023) ===
On August 1, 2022, he has signed with Hapoel Eilat of the Israeli Basketball Premier League.

== National team career ==
Artzi was a member of the U-16, U-18 and U-20 Israeli national teams.

In July 2017, Artzi helped the Israeli under-20 national team to reach the 2017 FIBA Europe Under-20 Championship Final, where they eventually lost to Greece. Artzi finished the tournament averaging 12.9 points and 6.3 rebounds per game, shooting 43.5 percent from three-point range.
