= Noam Dovrat =

Israeli basketball player (born 2002)

Noam Dovrat נעם דוברת
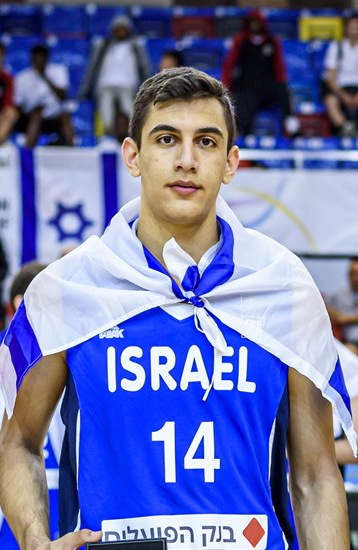
- Dovrat in 2019 with Israel

No. 14 – Ironi Ness Ziona
- Position: Point guard / shooting guard
- League: Israeli Basketball Premier League

Personal information
- Born: July 16, 2002 (age 24) Rishon LeZion, Israel
- Listed height: 6 ft 5 in (1.96 m)
- Listed weight: 187 lb (85 kg)

Career information
- College: Miami (Florida) (2025–2026)
- Playing career: 2018–present

Career history
- 2018–2021: Maccabi Rishon LeZion
- 2021–2025: Hapoel Jerusalem
- 2025: Maccabi Ironi Ramat Gan
- 2026-present: Ironi Ness Ziona

Career highlights
- 2× Israeli State Cup winner (2023, 2024); Israeli League Cup winner (2024); Israeli Basketball Premier League Most Improved Player (2021); Israeli Basketball Premier League Discovery of the Year (2020); FIBA U18 European Championship Division B MVP (2019)

Noam Shimon Dovrat (Hebrew: נועם שמעון דוברת; born July 16, 2002) is an Israeli professional basketball player for Ironi Ness Ziona of the Israeli Basketball Premier League. He also plays on the Israeli senior national basketball team.

He played one season of college basketball for the Miami Hurricanes of the Atlantic Coast Conference (ACC). Dovrat has also played for Maccabi Rishon LeZion, Hapoel Jerusalem, and Maccabi Ironi Ramat Gan of the Israeli Basketball Premier League (Hebrew: ליגת העל). He primarily plays the point guard position. He was named the 2020 Israeli Basketball Premier League Discovery of the Year, and the 2021 Israeli Basketball Premier League Most Improved Player.

== Early life ==
Dovrat grew up in Rishon LeZion. At the age of five, he joined the Maccabi Rishon LeZion basketball school, where he played across all youth age groups. During the 2017–18 season, he won both the national championship and the State Cup with the club's Under-16 team. In the 2018–19 season, he was named the Youth League's Southern District Player of the Year by the Israeli basketball website Safsal. Concurrently, Dovrat played for the basketball team of the Gymnasia Realia high school in Rishon LeZion.

Dovrat was diagnosed as a gifted child and, at age 14, joined the Bar-Ilan University program for talented youth in mathematics. He also began studying for a bachelor's degree at Tel Aviv University, but withdrew shortly after.

== National team career ==
In 2017, Dovrat was named to the Israeli Under-16 national team roster, but missed the European Championship in which Israel was 4-3, due to back pain. In 2018, he participated in the FIBA U16 European Championship held in Serbia, leading Team Israel in scoring with an average of 14.4 points per game, as Israel finished 3-4 in tenth place.

In 2019, Dovrat won the gold medal with the Israeli Under-18 national team at the FIBA U18 European Championship Division B in Romania. He led the tournament in scoring, averaging 16.1 points, 4.5 assists, and 1.3 steals per game, and was named the tournament's MVP and to the All-Tournament Team.

In 2022, he competed with the Israeli Under-20 national team at the FIBA U20 European Championship in Montenegro, where he averaged 17.7 points, 5.4 rebounds, 4.4 assists, and 1.7 steals per game, shot 85.7% from the free throw line, and was selected to the All-Tournament Team as Israel came in 4th out of 16 teams.

Dovrat has also played four games for the Israeli senior national basketball team, in which he averaged 15.0 minutes, 4.8 points, and 1.5 steals per game.

== Professional career ==
=== Maccabi Rishon LeZion ===
In February 2019, Dovrat was promoted to the senior team of Maccabi Rishon LeZion. Through the remainder of the 2018–19 regular season at 16 years of age, he appeared in eight games, seeing limited playing time, only 57 minutes total in which scored 11 points and had 6 rebounds and 3 assists. He reached the Final Four final with the team, where they were defeated by Maccabi Tel Aviv, though he played sparingly during the playoffs as well. In the summer of 2019, Dovrat signed a four-year contract extension with Rishon LeZion, with the agreement that he would play exclusively for the senior team.

During the 2019–20 season, Dovrat received significantly more playing time in both the Israeli Basketball Premier League and the EuroCup, occasionally entering the starting lineup. He completed the season playing 42 games and averaging 4.5 points in 16.9 minutes per game, and again reached the Final Four final, where Rishon LeZion once more fell to Maccabi Tel Aviv. At the conclusion of the season, he was named the Israeli Basketball Premier League Discovery of the Year.

In the 2020–21 season, in 34 games (26 starts) Dovrat averaged 10.2 points, 3.1 rebounds, 3.5 assists, and 1.1 steals in 27.8 minutes per game. However, he sustained a right elbow dislocation toward the end of the season and did not return to play, missing the State Cup final in which Rishon LeZion lost to Maccabi Tel Aviv. Despite the injury, he was named the Israeli Basketball Premier League Most Improved Player at the end of the season.

Dovrat returned to the court at the start of the 2021–22 season but struggled to replicate his pre-injury form, averaging 5.1 points, 2.1 rebounds, and 1.9 assists per game in 12 games.

=== Hapoel Jerusalem ===
In December 2021, Dovrat transferred to Hapoel Jerusalem for an estimated buyout fee of 1.3 million NIS, signing a three-and-a-half-year contract that included release clauses for the EuroLeague and the NBA. He made his debut for Hapoel Jerusalem on 1 January 2022, in a game against Maccabi Tel Aviv. He played 23 games for the team in the remainder of the 2021–22 season.

In November 2022, during a Basketball Champions League game, Dovrat suffered a severe right knee injury, involving tears to his anterior cruciate ligament (ACL), collateral ligament, and meniscus, alongside tendon damage, that required surgery and sidelined him for a year and a half. In his shortened 2022-23 season, in 11 games he averaged 19.8 minutes, 5.8 points, 1.5 rebounds, and 2.2 assists per game.

In May 2024, shortly after recovering from the injury, he won the Israeli Basketball State Cup and the 2024 Israeli Basketball League Cup with Hapoel Jerusalem. In his shortened 2023-24 season, in 12 games he averaged 14.0 minutes, 5.8 points, 2.5 rebounds, and 1.4 assists per game.

In 2024-25 with the team, he played 30 games, and averaged 4.3 points, 1.9 rebounds, and 2.1 assists per game (including 5.2 points, 2.0 rebounds, and 2.4 assists in 17 Israeli Basketball Premier League games.

=== Maccabi Ironi Ramat Gan ===
On 18 April 2025, ahead of the playoffs, Dovrat was traded to Maccabi Ironi Ramat Gan in exchange for Roi Huber. He played four games for the team in 2025, in which he averaged 21.5 minutes, 4.5 points, 1.8 rebounds, and 2.8 assists per game.

=== Ironi Ness Ziona ===
In 2026-27 he is playing for Ironi Ness Ziona of the Israeli Basketball Premier League, with which he had signed in July 2026 after playing one year of college basketball with the Miami Hurricanes.

== College career ==
On 29 July 2025, Dovrat committed to play college basketball for the University of Miami Hurricanes. Playing for the university in 2025-26, he competed in 28 games, averaging 9.1 minutes and 3.6 points per game, as he shot 45.2% from the field and 46.6% from three-point range, and helped the team reach the 2026 NCAA Tournament.
