= Nimrod Tishman =

Israeli basketball player

Nimrod Tishman נמרוד טישמן
Personal information
- Born: 12 May 1991 (age 35) Tel Aviv, Israel
- Listed height: 6 ft 3 in (1.91 m)
- Listed weight: 190 lb (86 kg)

Career information
- College: Florida (2009–2010)
- NBA draft: 2011: undrafted
- Playing career: 2011–2023
- Position: Point guard / shooting guard

Career history
- 2011–2014: Hapoel Gilboa Galil
- 2015–2016: Maccabi Kiryat Gat
- 2016–2017: Maccabi Ashdod
- 2017–2018: Maccabi Kiryat Gat
- 2018–2021: Maccabi Rishon LeZion
- 2021–2022: Ironi Ness Ziona
- 2022–2023: Maccabi Rishon LeZion

Career highlights
- Israeli League Cup winner (2018); Israeli League All-Star (2014)

Nimrod Tishman (Hebrew: נמרוד טישמן; born 12 May 1991) is an Israeli former professional basketball player. He played college basketball for the University of Florida before playing professionally in Israel.

== College career ==
Tishman successfully represented Israel at the 2009 European Under-18 Championships in France, leading the team with 8.3 points, 4.0 rebounds and 2.3 assists for the tournament.

Florida Gators associate head coach Larry Shyatt recruited him. Tishman had to be cleared by the NCAA because of his international status, and it was not until October 2009 that he could play for the team. Tishman returned home after the 2009–2010 season to play professionally after playing limited minutes, the last game being against the LSU Tigers.

== Professional career ==
Tishman did not play during the 2010–2011 season. He went undrafted during the 2011 NBA draft.

In July 2011 Hapoel Gilboa Galil signed him to a contract.

On 27 July 2015, he signed with Maccabi Kiryat Gat after playing for Hapoel Gilboa Galil from 2011 to 2014

On 15 August 2016, he signed with Maccabi Ashdod B.C.

On 14 September 2017, he returned to Maccabi Kiryat Gat for a second stint, signing a one-year deal. Tishman helped Kiryat Gat to reach the 2018 Liga Leumit Finals where they eventually lost Hapoel Be'er Sheva.

On 9 July 2018, he signed a two-year deal with Maccabi Rishon LeZion.

On 20 July 2021, he signed with Ironi Ness Ziona of the Israeli Basketball Super League (IBSL).
