= Rafi Menco =

Israeli basketball player

Rafi Menco רפי מנקו
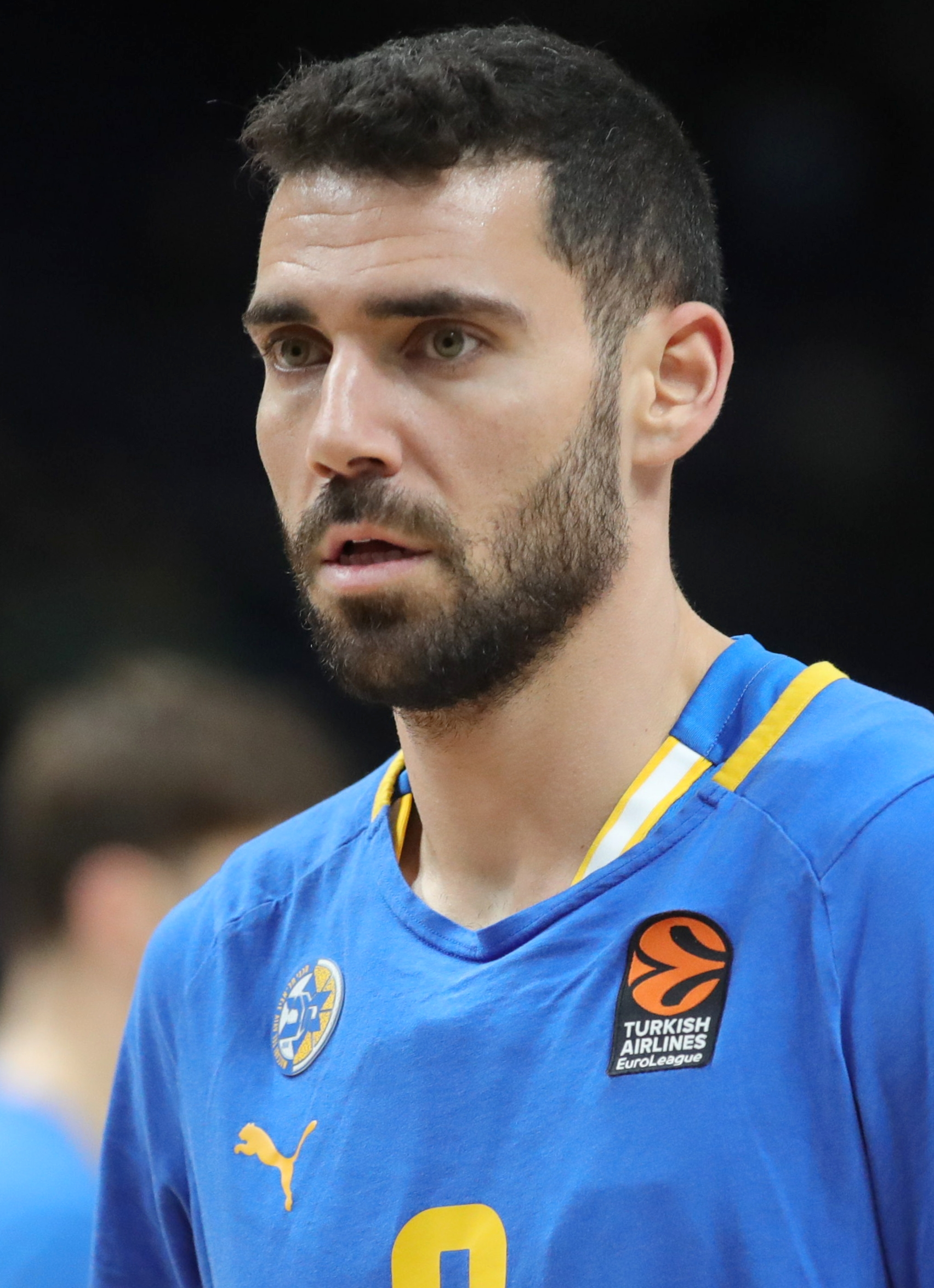
- Menco with Maccabi Tel Aviv in 2022

No. 9 – Hapoel HaEmek
- Position: Small forward
- League: Israeli Basketball Premier League

Personal information
- Born: 5 March 1994 (age 32) Jerusalem, Israel
- Listed height: 2.00 m (6 ft 7 in)
- Listed weight: 100 kg (220 lb)

Career information
- NBA draft: 2016: undrafted
- Playing career: 2012–present

Career history
- 2012–2017: Hapoel Jerusalem
- 2014–2015: → Hapoel Gilboa Galil
- 2016–2017: → Hapoel Eilat
- 2017–2018: Hapoel Tel Aviv
- 2018–2020: Hapoel Eilat
- 2020–2021: Élan Chalon
- 2021–2022: Hapoel Holon
- 2022–2025: Maccabi Tel Aviv
- 2026–present: Hapoel HaEmek

Career highlights
- Israeli League champion (2022, 2023, 2024); Israeli League Cup winner (2016); Israeli League Most Improved Player (2017); All-Israeli League Second Team (2017); Israeli League All-Star (2019)

Rafael "Rafi" Menco (Hebrew: רפי מנקו; born 5 March 1994) is an Israeli professional basketball player for Hapoel HaEmek of the Israeli Basketball Premier League. He was named the Israeli Basketball Premier League Most Improved Player in 2017, and an Israeli Basketball Premier League All-Star in 2019.

== Early life ==
Menco was born in Jerusalem. He played basketball for Wingate Institute youth academy.

== Professional career ==
=== Early years (2012–2016) ===
In 2012, Menco started his professional career with Hapoel Jerusalem. On 21 October 2012, Menco made his professional debut in a match against Hapoel Tel Aviv.

On 17 July 2014, Menco was loaned to Hapoel Gilboa Galil for the 2014–15 season. On 25 April 2015, Menco recorded a season-high 18 points, shooting 7-of-11 from the field, along with five rebounds, two assists, and three steals in an 89–72 win over Maccabi Tel Aviv. In 31 games played for Gilboa Galil, he averaged 7.9 points, 4.7 rebounds, 1.8 assists, and 1.1 steals per game.

On 20 June 2015, Menco signed a three-year deal with Hapoel Jerusalem. On 3 February 2016, Menco recorded a season-high 18 points, shooting 8-of-12 from the field, along with five rebounds and four steals in a 94–103 loss to Avtodor Saratov. Menco won the 2016 Israeli League Cup title with Jerusalem.

=== Hapoel Eilat (2016–2017) ===
On 25 November 2016, Menco was loaned to Hapoel Eilat for the 2016–17 season. On 20 March 2017, Menco recorded a double-double of 22 points and a career-high 13 rebounds, shooting 8-of-12 from the field, leading Eilat to a 94–85 win over Maccabi Rishon LeZion. He was subsequently named Israeli League Round 23 MVP. On 29 March, Menco was named the Israeli Player of the Month for games played in March.

In 28 games played for Eilat, he averaged 9.3 points, 6 rebounds, 1.8 assists and 1.1 steals per game. Menco helped Eilat reach the 2017 Israeli League Playoffs as the second seed, but they eventually were eliminated by Maccabi Rishon LeZion in the Quarterfinals. On 6 June 2017, Menco was named co-Israeli Basketball Premier League Most Improved Player, alongside Idan Zalmanson and earned a spot in the All-Israeli League Second Team.

=== Hapoel Tel Aviv (2017–2018) ===
On 26 July 2017, Menco joined Hapoel Tel Aviv, signing a one-year deal with an option for another one. On 2 January 2018, Menco recorded a season-high 17 points, shooting 7-of-14 from the field, along with six rebounds and two assists in a 77–73 win over Maccabi Tel Aviv. Menco helped Hapoel reach the 2018 Israeli League Final Four for the first time in 13 years.

On 5 July 2018, Menco signed a one-year contract extension with Hapoel. However, on 5 December 2018, Menco parted ways with Hapoel.

=== Return to Eilat (2018–2020) ===
On 24 December 2018, Menco returned to Hapoel Eilat for a second stint, signing for the rest of the season. In 28 games played for Eilat during the 2018–-19 season, he averaged 8.8 points, 3.1 rebounds and 1.6 assists per game, while shooting 43.2 percent from three-point range. Menco helped Eilat reach the 2019 Israeli League Final Four, where they eventually lost to Maccabi Tel Aviv.

On 3 November 2019, Menco recorded a then career-high 24 points, shooting 10-of-12 from the field in a 90–81 win over Hapoel Holon. Three days later, he was named Israeli League Round 5 MVP. On 16 February 2020, Menco recorded a career-high 25 points, while shooting 9-of-12 from the field, along with seven rebounds and three assists, leading Eilat to an 89–84 win over Ironi Nahariya. He was subsequently named Israeli League Round 19 MVP. He averaged 13.4 points and 5.2 rebounds per game.

=== Élan Chalon (2020–2021) ===
On 17 July 2020, Menco signed with Élan Chalon of the LNB Pro A. On 13 September 2020, Élan Chalon won the pre-season LUXTROPHY tournament, and Menco rewarded to be the MVP of the tournament with 17 points and evaluation of 21.

=== Hapoel Holon (2021–2022) ===
On 29 July 2021, Menco signed with Hapoel Holon of the Israeli Basketball Premier League.

=== Maccabi Tel Aviv (2022–present) ===
On 28 June 2022, Menco signed with Maccabi Tel Aviv of the Israeli Basketball Premier League and the EuroLeague. He won the 2022–23 and 2023–24 Israeli Basketball Premier League with Maccabi.

== National team career ==
Menco is a member of the Israeli national basketball team. On 24 November 2017, he made his first appearance for the senior team at the 2019 FIBA Basketball World Cup qualification match against Estonia.

Menco was also a member of the U-16, U-18 and U-20 Israeli national teams.

== Career statistics ==
Legend
GP	Games played	GS	Games started	MPG	Minutes per game
FG%	Field-goal percentage	3P%	3-point field-goal percentage	FT%	Free-throw percentage
RPG	Rebounds per game	APG	Assists per game	SPG	Steals per game
BPG	Blocks per game	PPG	Points per game	PIR	Performance index rating
**Bold**	Career high

=== EuroLeague ===
Year	Team	GP	GS	MPG	FG%	3P%	FT%	RPG	APG	SPG	BPG	PPG	PIR
2022–23	Maccabi Tel Aviv	**22**	0	5.5	.370	.235	**1.000**	.9	**.3**	**.2**	—	1.2	0.7
2023–24	Maccabi Tel Aviv	20	0	**8.3**	**.426**	**.423**	.500	**1.4**	**.3**	**.2**	**.1**	**2.7**	**1.7**
Career		42	0	6.8	.405	.349	.714	1.1	.3	.2	.0	1.9	1.2

=== EuroCup ===
Year	Team	GP	GS	MPG	FG%	3P%	FT%	RPG	APG	SPG	BPG	PPG	PIR
2012–13	Hapoel Jerusalem	1	0	1.0	—	—	—	—	—	—	—	0.0	0.0
2013–14	Hapoel Jerusalem	**14**	0	6.1	.333	.222	**1.000**	.5	**.1**	.1	—	1.4	-0.1
2015–16	Hapoel Jerusalem	8	0	**7.5**	**.600**	**.600**	.500	**1.4**	**.1**	**.6**	—	**3.5**	**3.5**
2016–17	Hapoel Jerusalem	1	0	1.0	—	—	—	—	—	—	—	0.0	0.0
Career		24	0	6.2	.455	.357	.750	.8	.1	.3	—	2.0	1.1

=== Basketball Champions League ===
Year	Team	GP	GS	MPG	FG%	3P%	FT%	RPG	APG	SPG	BPG	PPG
2021–22	Hapoel Holon	19	14	21.7	.388	.377	.758	3.8	1.1	.6	.2	8.2
Career		19	14	21.7	.388	.377	.758	3.8	1.1	.6	.2	8.2

=== Domestic leagues ===
Year	Team	League	GP	MPG	FG%	3P%	FT%	RPG	APG	SPG	BPG	PPG
2012–13	(Israel) Hapoel Jerusalem	Ligat HaAl	8	2.4	.500	—	.500	.4	.2	—	—	0.4
2013–14	(Israel) Hapoel Jerusalem	Ligat HaAl	28	7.9	.368	.320	.875	.8	.4	.2	—	2.0
2014–15	(Israel) Hapoel Gilboa Galil	Ligat HaAl	31	25.9	.399	.268	.889	4.7	1.8	1.1	.2	7.9
2015–16	(Israel) Hapoel Jerusalem	Ligat HaAl	36	12.1	.462	.448	.652	2.3	.9	.5	.1	3.8
2016–17	(Israel) Hapoel Jerusalem	Ligat HaAl	6	7.5	.000	—	1.000	1.2	.2	.3	—	0.3
2016–17	(Israel) Hapoel Eilat	Ligat HaAl	28	27.1	.490	.382	.700	6.0	1.9	1.1	.4	9.3
2017–18	(Israel) Hapoel Tel Aviv	Ligat HaAl	38	25.6	.414	.347	.708	4.7	1.7	.8	.2	8.7
2018–19	(Israel) Hapoel Tel Aviv	Ligat HaAl	7	22.4	.432	.375	.667	2.9	1.9	1.3	.1	6.9
2018–19	(Israel) Hapoel Eilat	Ligat HaAl	28	19.6	.505	.432	.690	3.1	1.6	.7	.1	8.9
2019–20	(Israel) Hapoel Eilat	Ligat HaAl	28	30.0	.490	.347	.769	5.2	1.9	.9	.1	13.4
2020–21	(France) Élan Chalon	Pro A	33	22.0	.442	.369	.706	3.5	1.7	.7	.1	7.7
2021–22	(Israel) Hapoel Holon	Ligat HaAl	35	23.2	.444	.390	.686	4.3	1.9	.6	.2	9.3
2022–23	(Israel) Maccabi Tel Aviv	Ligat HaAl	35	20.0	.388	.331	.844	3.3	1.3	.7	.0	6.6
2023–24	(Israel) Maccabi Tel Aviv	Ligat HaAl	34	20.8	.438	.319	.657	4.5	1.0	.8	.2	8.0
