= Itay Segev =

Israeli basketball player (born 1995)

Itay Segev איתי שגב
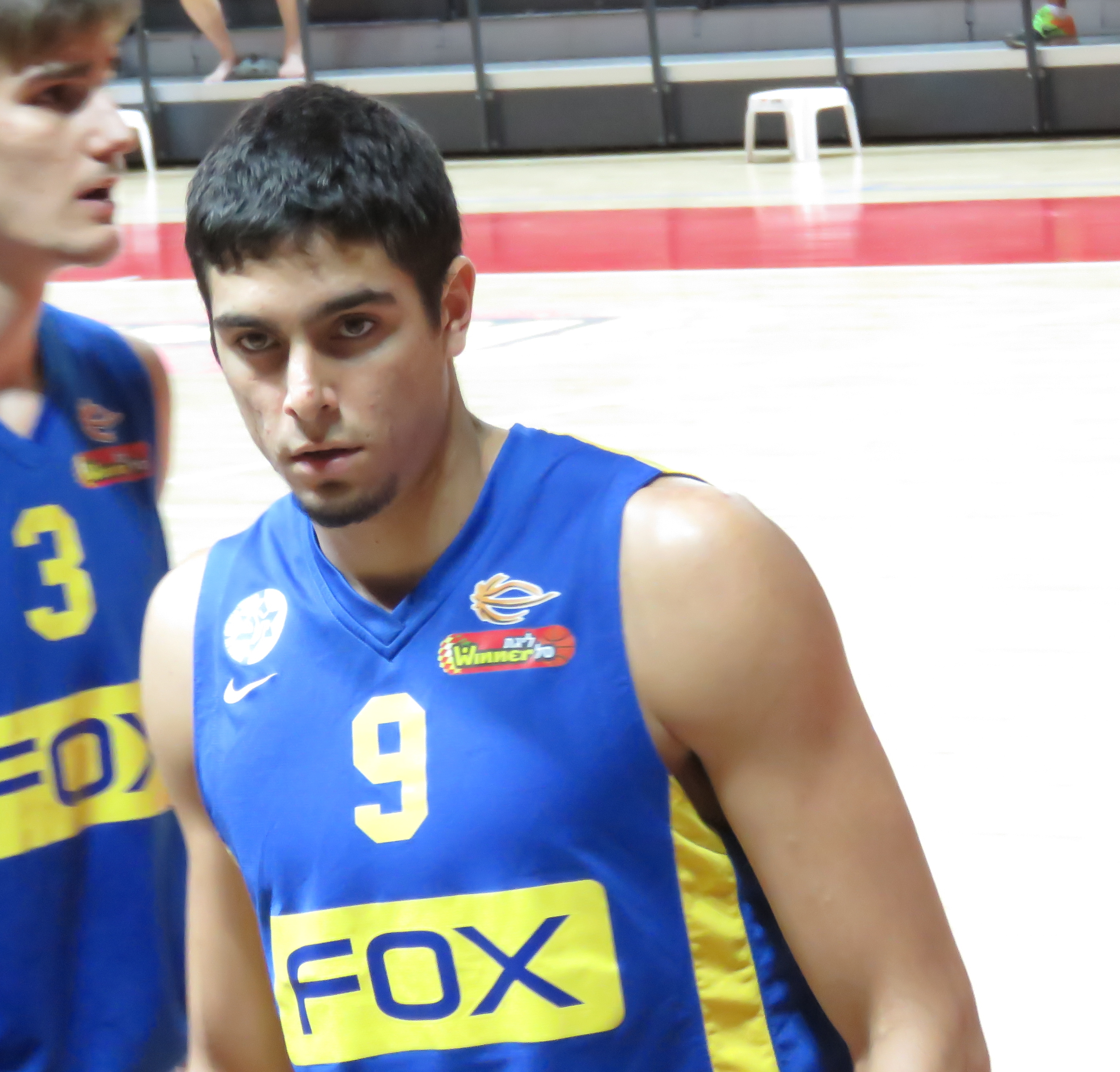
- Segev with Maccabi Tel Aviv in 2015

No. 6 – Hapoel Tel Aviv
- Position: Power forward / centre
- League: Israeli Premier League; EuroLeague

Personal information
- Born: June 15, 1995 (age 31) Kfar Tavor, Israel
- Listed height: 2.05 m (6 ft 9 in)
- Listed weight: 105 kg (231 lb)

Career information
- Playing career: 2012–present

Career history
- 2012–2018: Maccabi Tel Aviv
- 2013–2014: →Hapoel Holon
- 2014–2015: →Hapoel Gilboa Galil
- 2018–2019: Maccabi Rishon LeZion
- 2019–2020: Ironi Nahariya
- 2020–2021: BCM Gravelines-Dunkerque
- 2021–2023: Hapoel Jerusalem
- 2023–2025: Ironi Ness Ziona
- 2025–present: Hapoel Tel Aviv

Career highlights
- Israeli League champion (2018); 4× Israeli Cup winner (2013, 2016-2017, 2023); 2× Israeli League Cup winner (2017-2018); Israeli League Most Improved Player (2016); 2× Israeli League All-Star (2015, 2017)

Itay Segev (Hebrew: איתי שגב; born June 15, 1995) is an Israeli professional basketball player for Hapoel Tel Aviv of the Israeli Basketball Premier League and the EuroLeague. He was named the Israeli League Most Improved Player in 2016.

== Early years ==
Segev was born in Kfar Tavor, Israel. He played for Hapoel Emek Yizra'el youth team and the Wingate Academy in his late teens.

== Professional career ==
On August 8, 2012, Segev started his professional career with Maccabi Tel Aviv, signing a five-year deal.

On August 26, 2013, Segev was loaned to Hapoel Holon for the 2013–14 season. On February 25, 2014, Segev won the Slam Dunk Contest during the 2014 Israeli All-Star Event.

On July 24, 2014, Segev was loaned to Hapoel Gilboa Galil for the 2014–15 season.

On August 8, 2015, Maccabi Tel Aviv announced that Segev will be included in their roster of the 2015–16 season. On June 3, 2016, Segev was named Israeli League Most Improved Player.

On June 23, 2016, Segev signed a two-year contract extension with Maccabi Tel Aviv.

On September 9, 2017, Segev was named Maccabi's team captain. However, On January 22, 2018, Maccabi announced that he will no longer serve as the team captain after requesting to leave the team.

On June 26, 2018, Segev signed with Maccabi Rishon LeZion for the 2018–19 season. Segev helped Rishon LeZion win the 2018 Israeli League Cup, as well as reaching the 2019 Israeli League Final, where they eventually lost to his former team Maccabi Tel Aviv.

On July 15, 2019, Segev signed a one-year deal with Ironi Nahariya.

On June 8, 2020, he signed with BCM Gravelines-Dunkerque of the French LNB Pro A.

On July 11, 2021, he signed with Hapoel Jerusalem of the Israeli Basketball Premier League and Basketball Champions League.

In summer 2023, he signed with Ironi Ness Ziona of the Israeli Basketball Premier League.

== Israeli national team ==
Segev was a member of the Israeli Under-16, Under-18 and Under-20 national teams. In 2016 He made his first appearance in the Israeli National team.

== See also ==
- Basketball in Israel
