= 2021–22 Israeli Basketball Premier League =

68th season of the Israeli Basketball Premier League

Israeli Basketball Premier League
- Season: 2021–22
- Dates: 9 October 2021 - June 2022
- Teams: 12
- TV partner: Sports Channel

Regular season
- Season MVP: (United States) Chinanu Onuaku
- Relegated: Maccabi Rishon LeZion

Finals
- Champions: Hapoel Holon (2nd title)
- Runners-up: Bnei Herzliya
- Semifinalists: Hapoel Jerusalem; Maccabi Tel Aviv
- Finals MVP: (United States) Joe Ragland

Awards
- Israeli MVP: (Israel) Nimrod Levi
- Rising Star: (Israel) Gabriel Chachashvili
- Best Defender: (United States) Chris Johnson
- Most Improved: (Israel) Michael Brisker
- Sixth Man: (United States) Jalen Adams
- Coach of the Year: (Israel) Oren Aharoni

Statistical leaders
Points	(United States) Sacha Killeya-Jones	18.4
Rebounds	(United States) Chinanu Onuaku	9.4
Assists	(Venezuela) Gregory Vargas	6.2

The 2021–22 Israeli Basketball Premier League, for sponsorship reasons Ligat Winner, was the 68th season of the Israeli Basketball Premier League. The league started on October 2, 2021.

== Format ==
The regular season will be played in a 22-round Round-Robin format. The top 6 finishers will play the 5 rounds "upper house", with the other 6 teams playing the 5 rounds "bottom house". The 6 upper group teams, joined by the top 2 teams from the bottom group, will play the quarter finals as Best-of-5 series. The semi finals and finals will be played as Best-of-3 series.

== Teams ==
Teams of the 2021–22 Israeli Basketball Premier League

Ironi Nahariya and Maccabi Haifa have been relegated to 2021–22 National League after placing the bottom two places of the 2020–21 Premier League. Hapoel Galil Elyon and Elitzur Netanya have been promoted to the league after placing the top two places of the 2020–21 National League.

On August 4, 2021, Israeli Basketball Premier League administration informed Elitzur Netanya that she will not be able to participate in the coming season because its home hall does not meet the league's threshold conditions and construction has not yet begun for a new hall in the city. On August 17, the Supreme Court of the Basketball Association approved the agreements reached by Elitzur Netanya and the League administration in a mediation process, thus enabling Elitzur Netanya participation in the current season. Finally, the promotion of the group was not approved as it did not meet the threshold conditions of budgetary control.

=== Stadia and locations ===
Team	Home city	Stadium	Capacity
Bnei Herzliya	Herzliya	HaYovel Herzliya	1,500
Hapoel Be'er Sheva	Be'er Sheva	Conch Arena	3,000
Hapoel Eilat	Eilat	Begin Arena	1,200
Hapoel Galil Elyon	Upper Galilee and Kiryat Shmona	HaPais Kfar Blum	2,000
Hapoel Gilboa Galil	Gilboa Regional Council	Gan Ner Sports Hall	2,057
Hapoel Haifa	Haifa	Romema Arena	5,000
Hapoel Holon	Holon	Holon Toto Hall	5,500
Hapoel Jerusalem	Jerusalem	Pais Arena	11,000
Hapoel Tel Aviv	Tel Aviv	Drive in Arena	3,504
Ironi Ness Ziona	Ness Ziona	Lev Hamoshava	1,300
Maccabi Rishon LeZion	Rishon LeZion	Beit Maccabi Rishon	2,000
Maccabi Tel Aviv	Tel Aviv	Menora Mivtachim Arena	10,383

=== Personnel and sponsorship ===
Team	Chairman	Head coach	Team captain	Kit manufacturer	Main sponsor
Bnei Herzliya	(Israel) Eldad Akunis	(Israel) Oren Aharoni	(Israel) Yair Kravitz	Peak	Ofek Dist
Hapoel Be'er Sheva	(Israel) Kfir Arazi	(Cyprus) Christoforos Livadiotis	(United States) (Israel) Travis Warech	Spalding	Altshuler Shacham
Hapoel Eilat	(Israel) Tal Pinhas	(Israel) Ariel Beit-Halahmy	(Israel) Roi Huber	Nike	Yossi Avrahami
Hapoel Galil Elyon	(Israel) Tamir Abrahams	(Israel) Barak Peleg	(Israel) Alon Sapir	AND1	Nofar Energy
Hapoel Gilboa Galil		(Israel) Guy Kaplan	(Israel) Yotam Hanochi	Macron	Gilboa Regional Council, Gevasol
Hapoel Haifa	(Israel) Yuval Rosman	(Israel) Elad Hasin	(Israel) Ofek Avital	Peak	B-Cure Laser
Hapoel Holon	(Israel) Eitan Lanciano	(Israel) Guy Goodes	(Israel) Guy Pnini	Kelme	Unet Credit
Hapoel Jerusalem	(Israel) Eyal Chomski	(Israel) Yotam Halperin	(Israel) Adam Ariel	Peak	Bank Yahav
Hapoel Tel Aviv	(Israel) Rami Cohen	(Israel) Danny Franco	(Israel) Bar Timor	Peak	SP Metzer
Ironi Ness Ziona	(Israel) Yaniv Mizrahi	(Israel) Lior Lubin	(Israel) Tal Dunne	Macron	Chai Motors
Maccabi Rishon LeZion	(Israel) Yossi Moldavsky	(Israel) Dror Cohen	(Israel) Netanel Artzi	Peak	Effi Capital
Maccabi Tel Aviv	(Israel) Shimon Mizrahi	(Israel) Avi Even	(United States) (Israel) John DiBartolomeo	Puma	Playtika

=== Managerial changes ===
Team	Outgoing manager	Manner of departure	Date of vacancy	Position in table	Replaced with	Date of appointment	Ref.
Hapoel Jerusalem	(Israel) Oren Amiel	Mutual consent	28 October 2021	5th (2–1)	(Israel) Yotam Halperin (interim)	28 October 2021	
Hapoel Be'er Sheva	(Israel) Rami Hadar	Resigned	21 November 2021	7th (3–4)	(Cyprus) Christoforos Livadiotis	30 November 2021	
Maccabi Rishon LeZion	(Israel) Guy Goodes	Mutual consent	21 December 2021	12th (2–8)	(Israel) Dror Cohen	26 December 2021	
Hapoel Holon	(Italy) Maurizio Buscaglia	Fired	6 January 2022	2nd (8–5)	(Israel) Guy Goodes	8 January 2022	
Maccabi Tel Aviv	(Greece) Ioannis Sfairopoulos	Fired	15 February 2022	3rd (9–6)	(Israel) Avi Even (interim)	15 February 2022	

== Regular season ==
Pos	Team	Pld	W	L	PF	PA	PD	PCT	Qualification or relegation
1	Maccabi Tel Aviv	22	15	7	1891	1688	+203	.682	Advance to the Top-teams League Group
2	Hapoel Jerusalem	22	15	7	1801	1666	+135	.682	Advance to the Top-teams League Group
3	Hapoel Holon	22	14	8	1782	1707	+75	.636	Advance to the Top-teams League Group
4	Bnei Herzliya	22	14	8	1824	1737	+87	.636	Advance to the Top-teams League Group
5	Hapoel Haifa	22	12	10	1721	1731	−10	.545	Advance to the Top-teams League Group
6	Hapoel Galil Elyon	22	11	11	1742	1759	−17	.500	Advance to the Top-teams League Group
7	Hapoel Tel Aviv	22	11	11	1798	1759	+39	.500	Advance to the Bottom-Teams League Group
8	Ironi Nes Ziona	22	10	12	1740	1832	−92	.455	Advance to the Bottom-Teams League Group
9	Hapoel Gilboa Galil	22	9	13	1716	1797	−81	.409	Advance to the Bottom-Teams League Group
10	Hapoel Eilat	22	9	13	1789	1823	−34	.409	Advance to the Bottom-Teams League Group
11	Hapoel Be'er Sheva	22	7	15	1612	1717	−105	.318	Advance to the Bottom-Teams League Group
12	Maccabi Rishon LeZion	22	5	17	1705	1905	−200	.227	Advance to the Bottom-Teams League Group

=== Rounds 1 to 22 ===
Home \ Away	MTA	HJE	HHO	BNH	HHA	HGE	HTA	INZ	HGG	HEI	HBS	MRL
Maccabi Tel Aviv		104–80	80–79	99–69	84–59	113–82	82–83	93–89	84–61	101–95	71–64	109–83
Hapoel Jerusalem	78–83		104–84	89–88	89–77	81–65	94–76	82–77	80–68	80–64	90–72	73–69
Hapoel Holon	88–82	85–87		89–77	87–70	80–68	99–77	76–55	84–82	72–90	72–69	101–67
Bnei Herzliya	71–59	85–79	82–91		90–81	79–72	74–63	84–60	80–71	88–79	85–91	92–88
Hapoel Haifa	75–92	73–71	83–76	81–80		71–76	93–77	88–57	72–68	89–71	71–67	98–94
Hapoel Galil Elyon	84–88	69–83	99–78	90–74	70–72		96–73	85–79	74–85	74–72	74–66	81–80
Hapoel Tel Aviv	78–77	75–87	67–62	76–79	92–71	97–99		99–83	89–68	97–64	65–77	104–79
Ironi Ness Ziona	87–73	56–78	73–85	89–88	86–77	100–82	90–76		81–71	68–85	96–91	68–79
Hapoel Gilboa Galil	87–83	78–72	74–81	82–94	71–80	71–62	73–87	78–89		94–86	72–60	96–88
Hapoel Eilat	66–77	82–77	85–60	79–96	79–67	94–87	62–88	104–80	94–97		93–99	77–79
Hapoel Be'er Sheva	74–71	58–74	74–75	65–75	53–80	61–73	88–82	72–88	83–69	76–84		67–79
Maccabi Rishon LeZion	56–86	78–73	62–78	64–94	101–93	62–80	62–77	86–89	94–100	77–84	78–85	

Legend: Blue = home team win; Red = away team win.
Matches with lighter background shading were decided after overtime.

=== Positions by round ===
The table lists the positions of teams after completion of each round. In order to preserve chronological evolvements, any postponed matches are not included in the round at which they were originally scheduled, but added to the full round they were played immediately afterwards.

Team ╲ Round	1	2	3	4	5	6	7	8	9	10	11	12	13	14	15	16	17	18	19	20	21	22
Maccabi Tel Aviv	2	4	3	2	4	2	2	5	3	2	3	3	3	3	6	4	3	2	2	3	3	1
Hapoel Jerusalem	4	2	5	1	1	1	1	1	1	1	1	1	1	1	1	1	2	1	1	1	1	2
Hapoel Holon	1	1	1	4	3	3	3	3	2	3	2	2	2	2	3	6	5	4	3	2	2	3
Bnei Herzliya	6	3	2	5	6	4	6	7	5	5	4	4	4	4	2	2	1	3	4	4	4	4
Hapoel Haifa	11	8	10	11	11	10	11	9	8	6	7	7	8	8	7	7	4	5	7	5	6	5
Hapoel Galil Elyon	9	6	4	3	2	5	4	2	4	4	5	5	5	5	4	3	6	7	6	8	7	6
Hapoel Tel Aviv	7	10	8	8	10	11	9	10	10	9	8	8	7	7	5	5	7	6	5	6	5	7
Ironi Ness Ziona	10	11	11	9	9	7	5	4	6	7	6	6	6	6	8	8	8	8	8	7	8	8
Hapoel Gilboa Galil	8	9	9	7	8	8	8	8	9	10	10	10	11	9	11	11	11	11	9	9	9	9
Hapoel Eilat	3	5	7	10	7	9	10	11	12	11	11	11	9	10	10	10	9	9	10	11	11	10
Hapoel Be'er Sheva	5	7	6	6	5	6	7	6	7	8	9	9	10	11	9	9	10	10	11	10	10	11
Maccabi Rishon LeZion	12	12	12	12	12	12	12	12	11	12	12	12	12	12	12	12	12	12	12	12	12	12

= Leader and advance to Top-teams League Group; = Advance to Top-teams League Group; = Advance to Bottom-teams League Group; = Last Place and Advance to Bottom-teams League Group

== Top-teams League Group ==
Pos	Team	Pld	W	L	PF	PA	PD	PCT	Qualification or relegation	HJE	MTA	BNH	HHO	HGE	HHA
1	Hapoel Jerusalem	27	19	8	2236	2070	+166	.704	Advance to the playoffs				76–69	94–78	80–67
2	Maccabi Tel Aviv	27	18	9	2339	2117	+222	.667	Advance to the playoffs	89–79		92–74			114–123
3	Bnei Herzliya	27	17	10	2259	2151	+108	.630	Advance to the playoffs	101–106				81–77	
4	Hapoel Holon	27	16	11	2155	2095	+60	.593	Advance to the playoffs		85–82	75–90			74–65
5	Hapoel Galil Elyon	27	13	14	2116	2147	−31	.481	Advance to the playoffs		68–71		75–70		
6	Hapoel Haifa	27	13	14	2112	2164	−52	.481	Advance to the playoffs			64–89		72–76	

=== Positions by round ===
Team ╲ Round	22	23	24	25	26	27
Hapoel Jerusalem	2	1	1	1	1	1
Maccabi Tel Aviv	1	3	2	2	2	2
Bnei Herzliya	4	4	4	3	3	3
Hapoel Holon	3	2	3	4	4	4
Hapoel Galil Elyon	6	6	5	5	5	5
Hapoel Haifa	5	5	6	6	6	6

= Leader and advance to playoffs; = Advance to the playoffs

== Bottom-Teams League Group ==
Pos	Team	Pld	W	L	PF	PA	PD	PCT	Qualification or relegation	HTA	HGG	HEI	INZ	HBS	MRL
7	Hapoel Tel Aviv	27	14	13	2213	2145	+68	.519	Advance to the playoffs			90–63	89–82	86–79	
8	Hapoel Gilboa Galil	27	13	14	2151	2214	−63	.481	Advance to the playoffs	84–75		91–81		102–89	
9	Hapoel Eilat	27	12	15	2193	2237	−44	.444					93–80		91–80
10	Ironi Ness Ziona	27	12	15	2177	2256	−79	.444			93–73			83–94	99–75
11	Hapoel Be'er Sheva	27	9	18	2042	2140	−98	.333				73–76			95–76
12	Maccabi Rishon LeZion	27	6	21	2093	2350	−257	.222	Relegation to Liga Leumit	78–75	79–85				

=== Positions by round ===
Team ╲ Round	22	23	24	25	26	27
Hapoel Tel Aviv	7	7	7	7	7	7
Hapoel Gilboa Galil	9	9	9	8	8	8
Hapoel Eilat	10	10	10	9	9	9
Ironi Ness Ziona	8	8	8	10	10	10
Hapoel Be'er Sheva	11	11	11	11	11	11
Maccabi Rishon LeZion	12	12	12	12	12	12

= Advance to the playoffs; = Relegation to Liga Leumit

== Playoffs ==
=== Brackets ===
Quarterfinals; 12–23 May 2022
2	Maccabi Tel Aviv	100	93	75	82	—	3
7	Hapoel Tel Aviv	88	86	93	77	—	1
3	Bnei Herzliya	107	93	88	—	—	3
6	Hapoel Haifa	85	89	73	—	—	0
1	Hapoel Jerusalem	85	96	87	84	—	3
8	Hapoel Gilboa Galil	88	61	60	42	—	1
4	Hapoel Holon	97	90	88	—	—	3
5	Hapoel Galil Elyon	68	89	68	—	—	0

Semifinals; 25 May–3 June 2022
2	Maccabi Tel Aviv	82	81	74	1
3	Bnei Herzliya	76	97	96	2
1	Hapoel Jerusalem	78	75	77	1
4	Hapoel Holon	93	61	80	2

Finals; 6–12 June 2022
3	Bnei Herzliya	71	74	—	0
4	Hapoel Holon	78	90	—	2

=== Quarterfinals ===
==== Game 1 ====
12 May 2022	Hapoel Jerusalem	85–88 (Series: 0–1)	Hapoel Gilboa Galil	Jerusalem
19:00	Scoring by quarter: 21–24, 24–19, 21–25, 19–20
5 Sport	Pts: Obasohan 22; Rebs: Rivers 8 Asts: Obasohan 5 PIR: Braimoh 25	Boxscore	Pts: Perrantes 27; Rebs: Cooke 19; Asts: Perrantes 8 PIR: Cooke 32	Arena: Pais Arena; Attendance: 5,541; Referees: Amit Balak, Dan Yalon, Guy Shmueli

12 May 2022	Maccabi Tel Aviv	100–88 (Series: 1–0)	Hapoel Tel Aviv	Tel Aviv
21:10	Scoring by quarter: 28–25, 20–24, 27–23, 25–16
5 Sport	Pts: Wilbekin 31; Rebs: Reynolds 8 Asts: Evans 7 PIR: Wilbekin 36	Boxscore	Pts: Timor 18; Rebs: Tokoto 6 Asts: Timor 10; PIR: Tokoto 16	Arena: Menora Mivtachim Arena; Attendance: 8,906; Referees: Omer Esteron, Kfir Mualem, Elad Leibowitz

12 May 2022	Bnei Herzliya	107–85 (Series: 1–0)	Hapoel Haifa	Herzliya
19:30	Scoring by quarter: 21–24, 26–24, 31–20, 29–17
5 LIVE	Pts: Kemp 28; Rebs: Van Vliet 8 Asts: Cooper 12; PIR: Kemp 29	Boxscore	Pts: Ennis 19; Rebs: Weisz & Dickey 8 Asts: Vargas 7 PIR: Dickey 21	Arena: HaYovel Herzliya; Attendance: 1,200; Referees: David Romano, Ofer Manheim, Rotem Kuza

13 May 2022	Hapoel Holon	97–68 (Series: 1–0)	Hapoel Galil Elyon	Holon
15:15	Scoring by quarter: 23–14, 20–15, 32–22, 22–17
5 Sport	Pts: McGee 18; Rebs: Kyser 8 Asts: Ragland & Misgav 5 PIR: Ragland 21	Boxscore	Pts: Iroegbu 19; Rebs: Levi 11; Asts: Kennedy 3 PIR: Iroegbu 18	Arena: Holon Toto Hall; Attendance: 3,800; Referees: Sefi Shemesh, Zahi Habdali, Pini Rimon

==== Game 2 ====
17 May 2022	Hapoel Gilboa Galil	61–96 (Series: 1–1)	Hapoel Jerusalem	Gan Ner
20:30	Scoring by quarter: 12–32, 20–23, 9–27, 20–14
5 Sport	Pts: Perrantes 10; Rebs: Cooke 10; Asts: Geffen 5 PIR: Perrantes & Cooke 10	Boxscore	Pts: Ariel14; Rebs: Segev10; Asts: Dovrat6; PIR: Adams27	Arena: Gan Ner Sports Hall; Attendance: 1,980; Referees: Ofer Manheim, Kfir Mualem, Zahi Habdali

15 May 2022	Hapoel Tel Aviv	86–93 (Series: 0–2)	Maccabi Tel Aviv	Tel Aviv
20:30	Scoring by quarter: 18–24, 18–26, 29–21, 21–22
5 Sport	Pts: Brown 26; Rebs: Tokoto 11; Asts: Brown 7 PIR: Brown 22	Boxscore	Pts: Sorkin 20; Rebs: Sorkin 9 Asts: Wilbekin & Evans 3 PIR: Sorkin 22	Arena: Drive in Arena; Attendance: 3,536; Referees: Sefi Shemesh, Erez Gurion, Adar Pe'er

16 May 2022	Hapoel Haifa	89–93(OT) (Series: 0–2)	Bnei Herzliya	Haifa
18:30	Scoring by quarter: 12–15, 22–18, 14–19, 27–23, Overtime: 14–18
5 LIVE	Pts: Vargas 22; Rebs: Dickey 8 Asts: Vargas 8 PIR: Dickey 23	Boxscore	Pts: Babb 25; Rebs: Kemp 8 Asts: Cooper 8 PIR: Kemp 26	Arena: Romema Arena; Attendance: 1,750; Referees: Amit Balak, Dan Yalon, Noam Gordon

16 May 2022	Hapoel Galil Elyon	89–90 (Series: 0–2)	Hapoel Holon	Kfar Blum
20:30	Scoring by quarter: 19–35, 25–19, 21–25, 24–11
5 LIVE	Pts: Levi 27; Rebs: Washington 11; Asts: Iroegbu & Kennedy 5 PIR: Kennedy 31	Boxscore	Pts: Ragland 27; Rebs: McGee 7 Asts: Ragland 6 PIR: Ragland 28	Arena: HaPais Kfar Blum; Attendance: 1,050; Referees: David Romano, Nir Meirson, Lior Beynish

==== Game 3 ====
20 May 2022	Hapoel Jerusalem	87–60 (Series: 2–1)	Hapoel Gilboa Galil	Jerusalem
15:00	Scoring by quarter: 17–19, 21–10, 21–21, 28–10
5 SPORT	Pts: Adams 16; Rebs: Braimoh 8 Asts: Rivers & Braimoh 4 PIR: Braimoh 18	Boxscore	Pts: Harrell 17; Rebs: Cooke & Harrel 17; Asts: Brisker 5 PIR: Harrel 18	Arena: Pais Arena; Attendance: 6,382; Referees: Sefi Shemesh, Nir Meirson, Ori Shalhavi

18 May 2022	Maccabi Tel Aviv	75–93 (Series: 2–1)	Hapoel Tel Aviv	Tel Aviv
21:00	Scoring by quarter: 18–25, 23–25, 14–28, 20–15
5 SPORT	Pts: DiBartolomeo 18; Rebs: Sorkin 8 Asts: Evans 5 PIR: DiBartolomeo 15	Boxscore	Pts: Timor 26; Rebs: Owens 6 Asts: Timor 6 PIR: Timor 35	Arena: Menora Mivtachim Arena; Attendance: 9,107; Referees: Amit Balak, Ofer Manheim, Dan Yalon

19 May 2022	Bnei Herzliya	88–73 (Series: 3–0)	Hapoel Haifa	Herzliya
19:00	Scoring by quarter: 23–11, 32–21, 17–24, 16–17
5 STARS	Pts: Babb 22; Rebs: Onuaku 15; Asts: Cooper 12; PIR: Onuaku 45	Boxscore	Pts: Rayman 21; Rebs: Vargas 9 Asts: Vargas 7 PIR: Rayman 24	Arena: HaYovel Herzliya; Attendance: 1,150; Referees: Omer Esteron, Zahi Habdali, Adar Pe'er

19 May 2022	Hapoel Holon	88–68 (Series: 3–0)	Hapoel Galil Elyon	Holon
19:30	Scoring by quarter: 18–23, 19–17, 32–13, 19–15
5 SPORT	Pts: McGee 41; Rebs: Zack 8 Asts: Ragland 9 PIR: McGee 46	Boxscore	Pts: Washington 23; Rebs: Mashour & Levi 9 Asts: Lewis 7 PIR: Washington 28	Arena: Holon Toto Hall; Attendance: 3,850; Referees: Erez Gurion, Elad Leibowitz, Rotem Kuza

==== Game 4 ====
23 May 2022	Hapoel Gilboa Galil	42–84 (Series: 1–3)	Hapoel Jerusalem	Gan Ner
20:30	Scoring by quarter: 15–25, 8–15, 11–15, 8–29
5 Sport	Pts: Cooke 12; Rebs: Cooke 11; Asts: Brisker 3 PIR: Cooke 16	Boxscore	Pts: Egbunu & Obasohan 14; Rebs: Adams 12; Asts: Four players 3 PIR: Egbunu 25	Arena: Gan Ner Sports Hall; Attendance: 1,720; Referees: Omer Esteron, Erez Gurion, Lior Beynish

22 May 2022	Hapoel Tel Aviv	77–82 (Series: 1–3)	Maccabi Tel Aviv	Tel Aviv
21:00	Scoring by quarter: 22–11, 21–24, 10–20, 24–27
5 Sport	Pts: Brown 23; Rebs: Tokoto 8 Asts: Brown 6 PIR: Brown 27	Boxscore	Pts: Wilbekin 28; Rebs: Sorkin 12; Asts: Wilbekin 6 PIR: Wilbekin 31	Arena: Drive in Arena; Attendance: 3,536; Referees: Sefi Shemesh, David Romano, Elad Leibowitz

=== Semifinals ===
==== Game 1 ====
27 May 2022	Hapoel Jerusalem	78–93 (Series: 0–1)	Hapoel Holon	Jerusalem
15:00	Scoring by quarter: 10–19, 26–26, 20–27, 22–21
5 Sport	Pts: Braimoh 20; Rebs: Egbunu 7 Asts: Obasohan 6 PIR: Rivers 21	Boxscore	Pts: Ragland 40; Rebs: Johnson 9 Asts: Ragland 9 PIR: Ragland 49	Arena: Pais Arena; Attendance: 7,348; Referees: Sefi Shemesh, Ofer Manheim, Nir Meirson

26 May 2022	Maccabi Tel Aviv	82–76 (Series: 1–0)	Bnei Herzliya	Tel Aviv
21:00	Scoring by quarter: 25–23, 16–22, 28–17, 13–14
5 Sport	Pts: Wilbekin 24; Rebs: Williams 7 Asts: Wilbekin & Evans 5 PIR: Wilbekin 30	Boxscore	Pts: Onuaku 25; Rebs: Onuaku 12; Asts: Babb 6 PIR: Onuaku 34	Arena: Menora Mivtachim Arena; Attendance: 9,210; Referees: Omer Esteron, Amit Balak, Kfir Mualem

==== Game 2 ====
30 May 2022	Hapoel Holon	61–75 (Series: 1–1)	Hapoel Jerusalem	Holon
21:00	Scoring by quarter: 16–17, 19–23, 10–9, 16–26
5 Sport	Pts: McGee 17; Rebs: Kyser 6 Asts: Ragland & Dalton 3 PIR: McGee & Kyser 11	Boxscore	Pts: Adams 23; Rebs: Braimoh 10; Asts: Adams & Braimoh 4 PIR: Adams 26	Arena: Holon Toto Hall; Attendance: 5,500; Referees: Amit Balak, David Romano, Elad Leibowitz

29 May 2022	Bnei Herzliya	97–81 (Series: 1–1)	Maccabi Tel Aviv	Herzliya
20:30	Scoring by quarter: 30–19, 20–23, 27–15, 20–24
5 Sport	Pts: Babb 23; Rebs: Onuaku 10; Asts: Cohen 6 PIR: Babb 32	Boxscore	Pts: Williams 18; Rebs: Nunnally 4 Asts: Nunnally 6 PIR: Nunnally 14	Arena: HaYovel Herzliya; Attendance: 1,250; Referees: Sefi Shemesh, Erez Gurion, Zahi Habdali

==== Game 3 ====
2 June 2022	Hapoel Jerusalem	77–80 (Series: 1–2)	Hapoel Holon	Jerusalem
20:00	Scoring by quarter: 21–18, 22–29, 16–16, 18–17
5 Plus	Pts: Obasohan 20; Rebs: Adams & Braimoh 7 Asts: Adams & Rivers 4 PIR: Braimoh 25	Boxscore	Pts: Ragland 30; Rebs: Johnson 10; Asts: Ragland 5 PIR: Ragland 27	Arena: Pais Arena; Attendance: 8,374; Referees: Sefi Shemesh, Omer Esteron, Zahi Habdali

1 June 2022	Maccabi Tel Aviv	74–96 (Series: 1–2)	Bnei Herzliya	Tel Aviv
21:00	Scoring by quarter: 18–26, 21–22, 16–24, 19–24
5 Sport	Pts: Wilbekin 22; Rebs: Sorkin 5 Asts: Wilbekin 6 PIR: Wilbekin 26	Boxscore	Pts: Onuaku 25; Rebs: Onuaku 15; Asts: Onuaku & Hooker 5 PIR: Onuaku 48	Arena: Menora Mivtachim Arena; Attendance: 9,271; Referees: Amit Balak, Ofer Manheim, Adar Pe'er

=== Finals ===
6 June 2022	Bnei Herzliya	71–78 (Series: 0–1)	Hapoel Holon	Herzliya
21:00	Scoring by quarter: 20–26, 13–13, 25–15, 13–24
5 Sport	Pts: Onuaku 18; Rebs: Onuaku 20; Asts: Three players 4 PIR: Onuaku 37	Boxscore	Pts: McGee 23; Rebs: Ragland 6 Asts: Ragland 9 PIR: Ragland 29	Arena: HaYovel Herzliya; Attendance: 1,500; Referees: Omer Esteron, Amit Balak, Dan Yalon

9 June 2022	Hapoel Holon	90–74 (Series: 2–0)	Bnei Herzliya	Holon
20:45	Scoring by quarter: 28–22, 21–20, 21–15, 20–17
5 Sport	Pts: Ragland 23; Rebs: Johnson 6 Asts: Ragland 7 PIR: Ragland 23	Boxscore	Pts: Kemp 21; Rebs: Onuaku 11; Asts: Dawson & Hooker 3 PIR: Kemp 27	Arena: Holon Toto Hall; Attendance: 5,600; Referees: Sefi Shemesh, David Romano, Ofer Manheim

2021–22 Israeli Premier League champions
Hapoel Holon
2nd title

== Awards ==
=== MVP of the Round ===
Round	Player	Team	EFF	Ref.
October
1	(United States) Bryon Allen	Hapoel Eilat	41	
2	(United States) Chinanu Onuaku	Bnei Herzliya	35	
3	(United States) Chris Babb	Bnei Herzliya	40	
November
4	(Belgium) Retin Obasohan	Hapoel Jerusalem	44	
5	(Republic of the Congo) Junior Etou	Hapoel Be'er Sheva	35	
5	(United States) Dererk Pardon	Hapoel Be'er Sheva	34	
6	(United States) Jalen Reynolds	Maccabi Tel Aviv	38	
7	(United States) (Brazil) Tim Soares	Ironi Ness Ziona	41	
December
8	(Israel) (Sweden) Nimrod Levi	Hapoel Galil Elyon	32	
9	(United States) Maurice Watson	Maccabi Rishon LeZion	27	
10	(Croatia) Ante Žižić	Maccabi Tel Aviv	35	
11	(United States) Justin Patton	Hapoel Eilat	45	
February
18	(United States) Chris Johnson (2/2)	Hapoel Holon	35	
March
19	(United States) Jalen Adams (1/2)	Hapoel Jerusalem	26	
20	(Israel) Michael Brisker (1/2)	Hapoel Gilboa Galil	34	
21	(Israel) Michael Brisker (2/2)	Hapoel Gilboa Galil	27	
22	(United States) D. J. Kennedy	Hapoel Galil Elyon	26	
April
23	(United States) Tyus Battle	Hapoel Gilboa Galil	36	
24	(United States) J'Covan Brown	Hapoel Tel Aviv	30	
May
26	(United States) D. J. Cooper	Bnei Herzliya	32	
27	(Israel) Golan Gutt	Ironi Ness Ziona	27	
–
12	(United States) Chris Johnson (1/2)	Hapoel Holon	27	
13	(United States) James Young	Hapoel Tel Aviv	38	
14	(United States) Adam Smith	Hapoel Holon	35	
15	(United States) (Cameroon) JP Tokoto	Hapoel Tel Aviv	21	
16	(United States) Scottie James	Hapoel Haifa	35	
17	(United States) Jalen Adams (2/2)	Hapoel Jerusalem	33	
25	(Israel) Amit Simhon	Hapoel Haifa	39	

=== Monthly Awards ===
==== Player of the Month ====
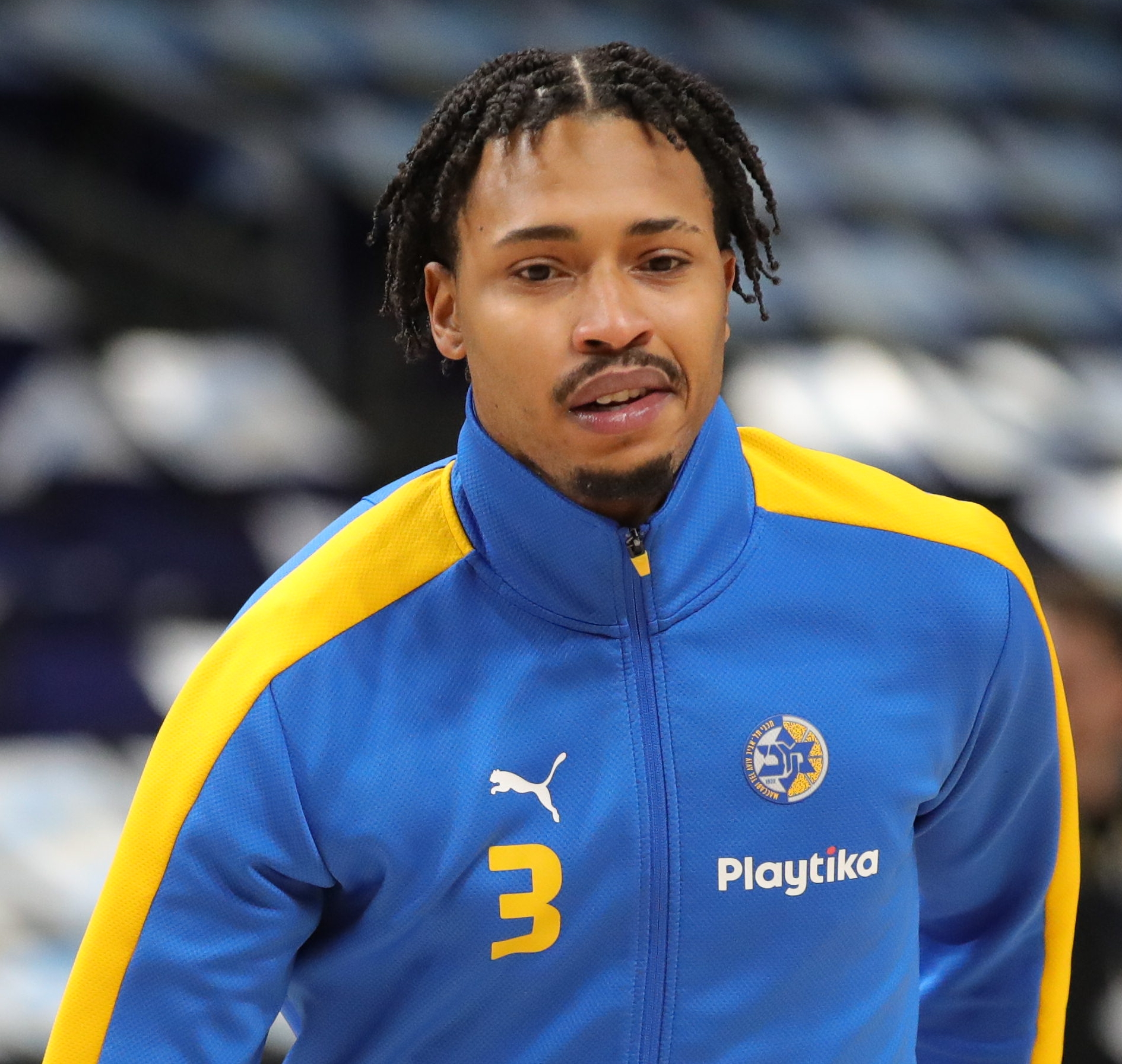
Jalen Adams

Month	Player	Team	EFF	Ref.
October	(United States) Chinanu Onuaku	Bnei Herzliya	24.0	
November	(United States) Diante Garrett	Ironi Ness Ziona	23.7	
December	(Belgium) Retin Obasohan	Hapoel Jerusalem	20.3	
January 22	(United States) James Young	Hapoel Tel Aviv	26.0	
February–March	(United States) Chris Babb	Bnei Herzliya	23.0	
April	(United States) Jalen Adams	Hapoel Jerusalem	18.8	

==== Israeli Player of the Month ====
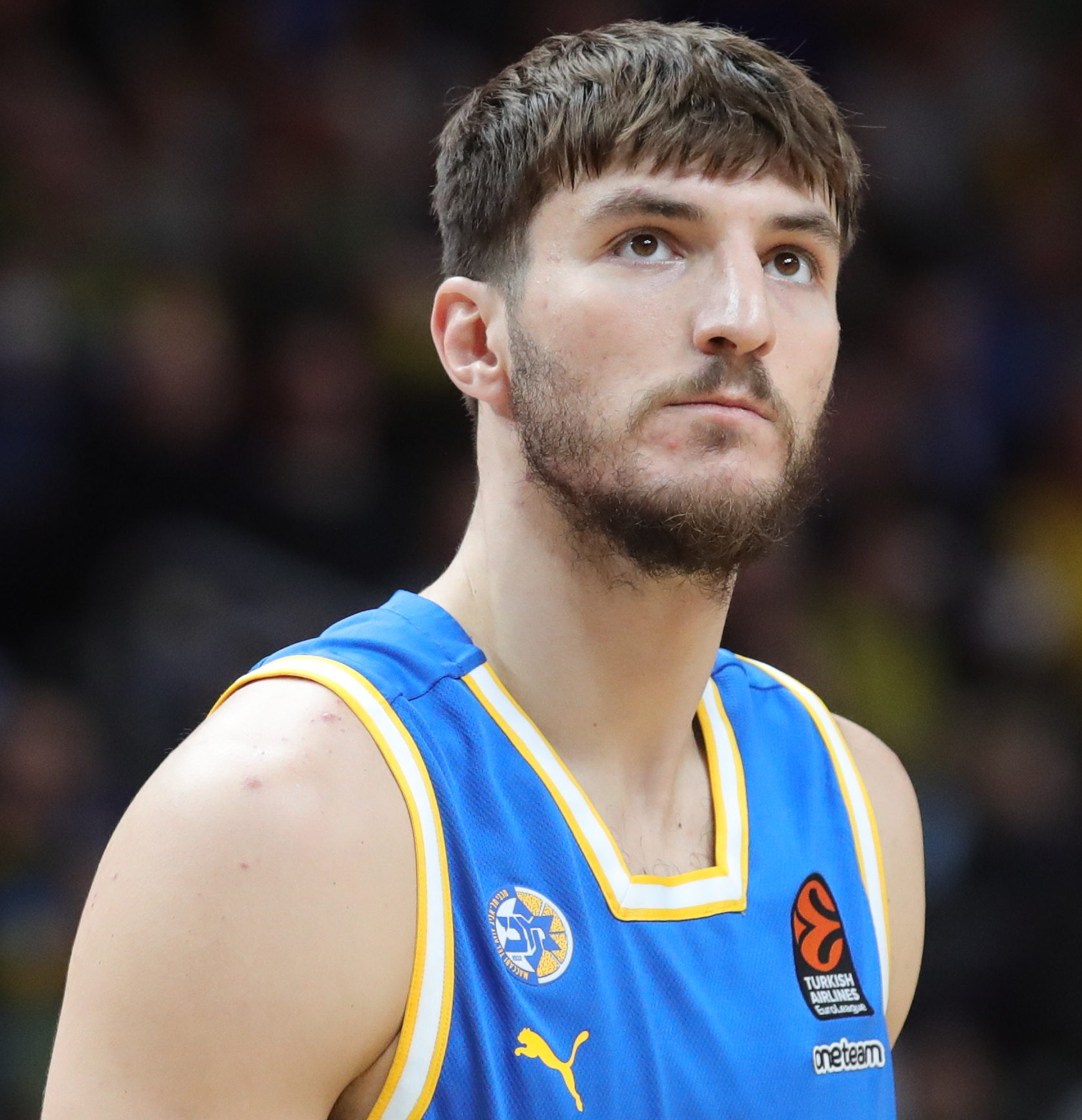
Roman Sorkin

Month	Player	Team	EFF	Ref.
October	(Israel) Roi Huber (1/2)	Hapoel Eilat	15.5	
November	(Israel) (Sweden) Nimrod Levi	Hapoel Galil Elyon	15.5	
December	(Israel) Roi Huber (2/2)	Hapoel Eilat	17.5	
January 22	(Israel) Bar Timor	Hapoel Tel Aviv		
February–March	(Israel) Michael Brisker	Hapoel Gilboa Galil	16.3	
April	(Israel) Roman Sorkin	Maccabi Tel Aviv	18.3	

==== Coach of the Month ====
Month	Coach	Team	W-L	Ref.
October	(Israel) Barak Peleg	Hapoel Galil Elyon	2–1	
November	(Israel) Lior Lubin	Ironi Ness Ziona	3–0	
December	(Israel) Yotam Halperin	Hapoel Jerusalem	4–0	
January 22	(Israel) Danny Franco	Hapoel Tel Aviv	3–0	
February–March	(Israel) Oren Aharoni	Bnei Herzliya	5–2	
April	(Israel) Guy Kaplan	Hapoel Gilboa Galil	3–1	

=== Yearly awards ===
Award	Winner	Team	Ref.
Regular season MVP	(United States) Chinanu Onuaku	Bnei Herzliya	
Regular season Israeli MVP	(Israel) (Sweden) Nimrod Levi	Hapoel Galil Elyon	
Rising Star	(Israel) Gabriel Chachashvili	Hapoel Galil Elyon	
Best Defender	(United States) Chris Johnson	Hapoel Holon	
Most Improved Player	(Israel) Michael Brisker	Hapoel Gilboa Galil	
Sixth Man of the Year	(United States) Jalen Adams	Hapoel Jerusalem	
Premier League Top 5 Players	(Belgium) Retin Obasohan	Hapoel Jerusalem	
Premier League Top 5 Players	(United States) Chris Babb	Bnei Herzliya	
Premier League Top 5 Players	(United States) Chris Johnson	Hapoel Holon	
Premier League Top 5 Players	(Israel) (Sweden) Nimrod Levi	Hapoel Galil Elyon	
Premier League Top 5 Players	(United States) Chinanu Onuaku	Bnei Herzliya	
Premier League Second Top 5 Players	(United States) (Liberia) Joe Ragland	Hapoel Holon	
Premier League Second Top 5 Players	(United States) Jalen Adams	Hapoel Jerusalem	
Premier League Second Top 5 Players	(United States) (Turkey) Scottie Wilbekin	Maccabi Tel Aviv	
Premier League Second Top 5 Players	(United States) (Cameroon) JP Tokoto	Hapoel Tel Aviv	
Premier League Second Top 5 Players	(Israel) Roman Sorkin	Maccabi Tel Aviv	
Coach of the Year	(Israel) Oren Aharoni	Bnei Herzliya	
Finals MVP	(United States) (Liberia) Joe Ragland	Hapoel Holon	

== Israeli clubs in European competitions ==
Competition	Team	Progress
EuroLeague	Maccabi Tel Aviv	Playoffs
Champions League	Hapoel Holon	4th place
Champions League	Hapoel Jerusalem	Play-ins
Champions League	Hapoel Eilat	Qualifying rounds
FIBA Europe Cup	Hapoel Eilat	Regular season
FIBA Europe Cup	Hapoel Gilboa Galil	Regular season
FIBA Europe Cup	Hapoel Haifa	Qualifying rounds
FIBA Europe Cup	Ironi Ness Ziona	Qualifying rounds
Balkan League	Hapoel Galil Elyon	Champion
Balkan League	Maccabi Haifa (National League)	Runner-up
Balkan League	Ironi Nahariya (National League)	3rd place
