= Dror Cohen (basketball) =

Israeli basketball coach (born 1974)

Personal information
- Born: January 17, 1974 (age 52) Ramat Gan, Israel

Career information
- Playing career: 1990–2008
- Position: Assistant coach
- Coaching career: 2008–present

Career history

Playing
- 1984–1996: Maccabi Tel Aviv
- 1996–1998: Elitzur Givat Shmuel
- 1998–1999: Bnei Herzliya
- 1999–2000: Ironi Ramat Gan
- 2000–2002: Maccabi Ra'anana
- 2002–2008: Elitzur Givat Shmuel

Coaching
- 2008–2009: Elitzur Givat Shmuel (assistant)
- 2010–2013: Hapoel Jerusalem (assistant)
- 2017–present: Israel men's national team (assistant)
- 2018–2022: Maccabi Rishon LeZion (assistant)

Dror Cohen (Hebrew: דרור כהן) is an Israeli basketball coach and former player.

He was one of the most respected players in Israeli basketball in the 1990s, when he spent 14 seasons in the Premier League where he scored 2,263 points.

== Personal ==
Dror Cohen is a good friend of Oded Katash, who is a former Israeli Coach of the Year.

== Playing career ==
Cohen and Katash have known each other since the age of 10 when they played together in the youth team of Maccabi Tel Aviv, and later also advanced to the seniors and played in their first season for Maccabi Ramat Gan.

He went on to play for Elitzur Givat Shmuel, Maccabi Ra'anana, Bnei Herzliya, Hapoel Eilat and Maccabi Jerusalem.

== Coaching career ==
Dror Cohen retired from active play in 2008. After retirement, Dror Cohen was immediately appointed Oren Aharoni's assistant at Elitzur Givat Shmuel, a team that was relegated and later changed its name to MK Baka.

In his first season, Cohen led the team to the national league championship and earned league promotion. Yet, the club waived its right to play in the Premier League for economic reasons.

In 2010, Cohen accepted an offer from Oded Katsh where Cohen then served as Katash's assistant at Hapoel Jerusalem.

In the following years, Cohen then established himself as one of the serious professionals in Israeli basketball, working with senior coaches such as Zvika Sharaf, Effi Birnbaum, Muli Katzurin and Sharon Drucker.

Inn March 2017, Dror Cohen accepted the position of Maccabi Rishon Lezion's assistant coach to Shmulik Brener. The team needed a replacement for Adir Amar, who had chosen to leave the club together with Arik Shibek who was fired.

Since 2019 he has served as Guy Goodes' assistant at Maccabi Rishon.

Cohen stated in early 2021: "I'm ready for the opportunity as head coach."

== Israeli national team ==
As a player Cohen capped for the Israeli national team on many occasions.

In 2017, Cohen again joined forces with Katash and became part of the team's coaching staff.
