= Dror Cohen =

Dror Cohen may refer to:

- Dror Cohen (basketball)
- Dror Cohen (sailor)
