= Dan Shamir =

Israeli basketball coach (born 1975)

Dan Shamir דן שמיר
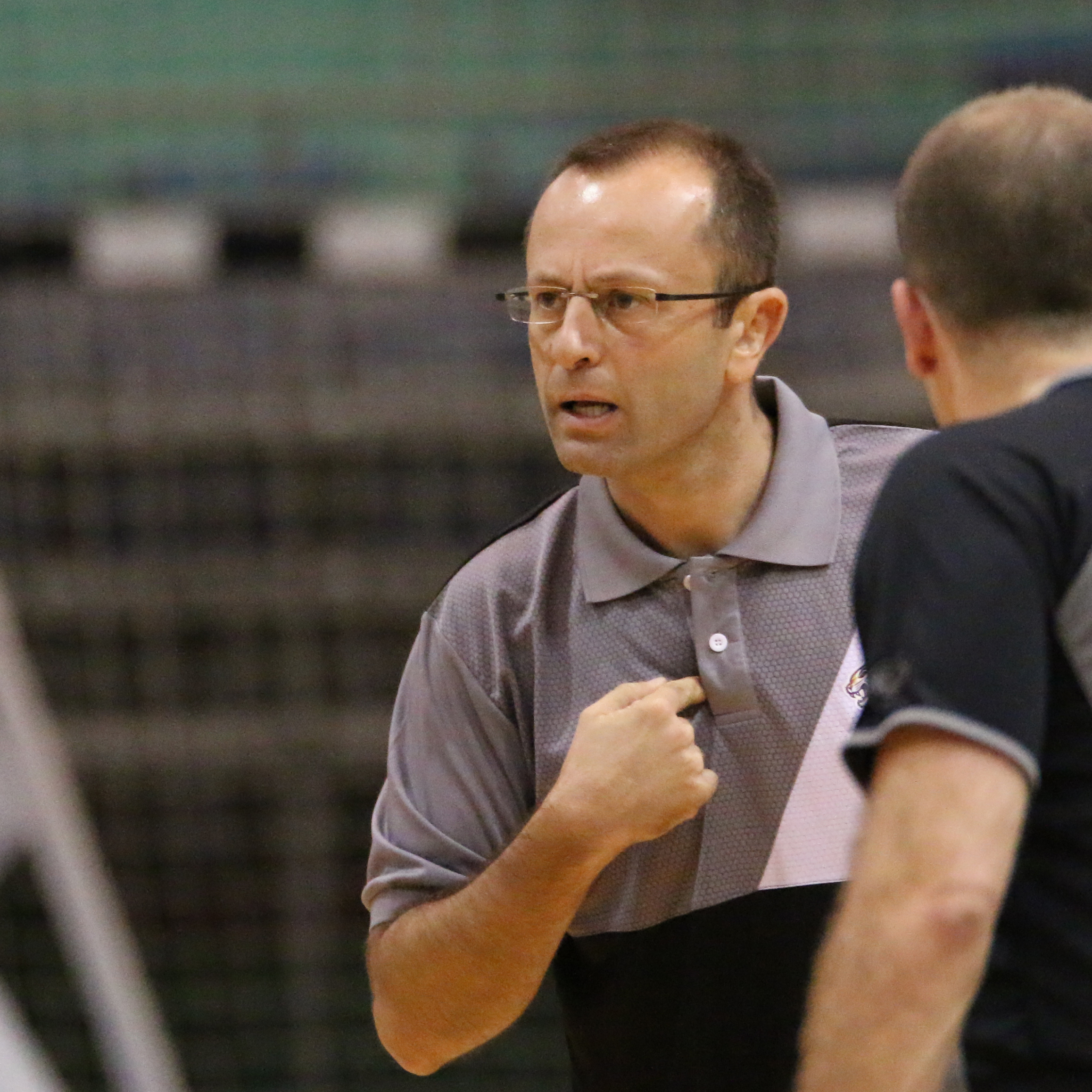
- Shamir with Hapoel Holon in October 2016

Bnei Herzliya
- Position: Head coach
- League: Israeli Basketball Premier League

Personal information
- Born: 2 February 1975 (age 51)

Career information
- Coaching career: 2001–present

Career history
- 2001–2003: Hapoel Jerusalem (assistant)
- 2003–2006: Maccabi Tel Aviv (assistant)
- 2006–2008: Hapoel Jerusalem
- 2008–2009: Dynamo Moscow (assistant)
- 2009–2011: Bnei Hasharon
- 2011–2013: Hapoel Holon
- 2013–2014: CSKA Moscow (assistant)
- 2014–2015: Hapoel Eilat
- 2015–2019: Hapoel Holon
- 2019–2022: New Zealand Breakers
- 2022–2023: Olimpia Milano (assistant)
- 2023–2024: Bnei Herzliya

Career highlights
- As head coach: 3× Israeli Cup winner (2007–2008, 2018); Israeli League Cup champion (2008); Israeli League Coach of the Year (2018); As assistant coach: 2× EuroLeague champion (2004, 2005); 4× Israeli League champion (2003, 2004, 2005, 2006); 4× Israeli Cup champion (2003, 2004, 2005, 2006); Russian League champion (2014); Gomelsky Cup champion (2014); VTB United League champion (2014)

Dan Shamir (Hebrew: דן שמיר; born 2 February 1975) is an Israeli professional basketball coach. In 2007 and 2008 he led Hapoel Jerusalem to consecutive Israeli State Cup titles, and in 2018 he led Hapoel Holon to the Israeli State Cup title. In 2018, Shamir was also named the Israeli Basketball Premier League Coach of the Year.

== Early life and personal life ==
Shamir grew up in Jerusalem, where his family is from. He is Jewish, and some of his family is ultra-religious. He played for the Maccabi Jerusalem youth team as a 5' 11" point guard until he was 17 years old. He started his coaching career in the Hapoel Jerusalem youth program at the age of 16.

Shamir is married, and has three children. He and his family now live in Auckland, New Zealand.

== Coaching career ==
In 1999 after completing his military service with the Israel Defense Forces, at 24 years of age Shamir spent one year training under Rick Pitino at the University of Kentucky, which according to him affected him profoundly.

He then led the Hapoel Jerusalem U-16 team to the state championship, and worked with the U-18 team. In 2001, Shamir was named the assistant coach of Hapoel Jerusalem under head coaches Yoram Harush and Erez Edelstein.

In 2003, Shamir was named the assistant coach of Maccabi Tel Aviv under head coach Pini Gershon. He won two EuroLeague titles in 2004 and 2005, and reached the Euroleague's championship game in 2006.

In 2006, Shamir was named the head coach of Hapoel Jerusalem, and signed a two-year contract. He led the team to two consecutive Israeli State Cup titles, in 2007 and 2008.

In 2008, Shamir was named the assistant coach of Dynamo Moscow, under head coach David Blatt.

In 2009, Shamir was named the head coach of Bnei Hasharon.

In 2011, Shamir was named the head coach of Hapoel Holon. He also served as assistant coach of the Israeli national basketball team in Eurobasket 2011.

In 2013, Shamir was named the assistant coach of CSKA Moscow under head coach Ettore Messina. Shamir helped CSKA win the VTB United League title, and reach the 2014 Euroleague Final Four, where they eventually lost to his former team Maccabi Tel Aviv.

In 2014, Shamir was named the new head coach of Hapoel Eilat, signing a two-year deal.

On November 27, 2015, Shamir returned to Hapoel Holon for a second stint, replacing Elad Hasin. In the 2016–17 season, Shamir led Holon to the 2017 Israeli League Playoffs as the first seed, but they eventually were eliminated by Maccabi Haifa in the Quarterfinals. On March 5, 2017, Shamir signed a two-year contract extension with Holon.

In the 2017–18 season, Shamir led Holon to the 2018 Israeli State Cup title, and it reached the 2018 Israeli League Finals. On June 14, 2018, Shamir was named the Israeli Basketball Premier League Coach of the Year. In the 2018–19 season, Shamir led Holon to the 2019 Israeli League Playoffs and the 2019 FIBA Europe Cup Semifinals, where they eventually lost to Dinamo Sassari.

In July 2019, Shamir was appointed Director of Basketball at the New Zealand Breakers, joining them as head coach and in an off-the-court role.

In the 2019-20 NBL season, the Breakers finished with a 15–13 record and did not qualify for the playoffs. In the 2020-21 NBL season, the Breakers finished with a 12–24 record and again did not qualify for the playoffs. Despite missing the playoffs in both of his first two seasons as head coach, Shamir was offered a two-year contract extension in July 2021 to remain at the club until at least the 2023-24 Australian NBL season.

In the 2021-22 NBL season, the Breakers finished at the bottom of the league with a 5–23 record, which was the Breakers' worst finish in franchise history. On May 11, 2022, Shamir resigned as head coach of the New Zealand Breakers, with lead assistant coach Mody Maor being named as his replacement later that day.
