= Arik Shivek =

Israeli basketball coach

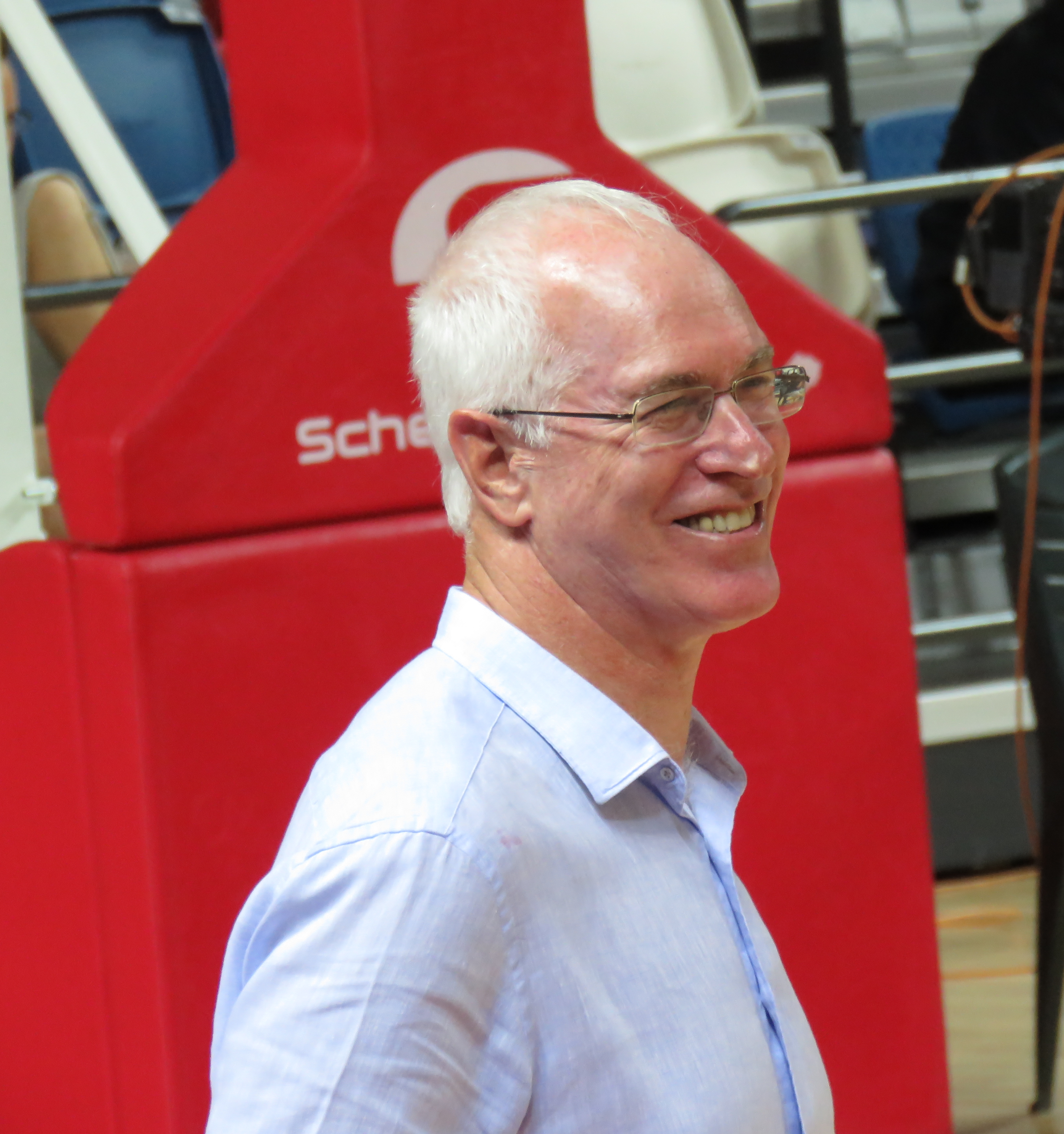
- Shivek with Hapoel Eilat (2015)

Personal information
- Born: 10 September 1956 (age 70) Netanya, Israel
- Position: Head coach
- Coaching career: 1983–present

Career history

Coaching
- 1983–1985: Maccabi Netanya
- 1985–1986: Maccabi Hadera
- 1986–1988: Hapoel Gan Shmuel
- 1989–1990: Elitzur Ramla
- 1990–1993: Hapoel Eilat
- 1993–1996: Hapoel Galil Elyon
- 1996–1999: Maccabi Ra’anana
- 1999–2001: Ironi Ramat Gan
- 2001–2002: Hapoel Tel Aviv
- 2003–2004: Israel
- 2003–2005: Amsterdam
- 2005–2007: Antwerp Giants
- 2007–2009: Amsterdam
- 2009–2012: Dexia Mons-Hainaut
- 2009–2014: Israel
- 2015–2016: Hapoel Eilat
- 2016–2017: Maccabi Rishon LeZion
- 2017: Maccabi Tel Aviv
- 2017–2018: Bnei Herzliya
- 2019: Bnei Herzliya
- 2020–2023: Orange Lions Academy
- 2023–2025: Netherlands

Career highlights
- As head coach: Israeli Super League Coach of the Year (2016); Israeli Super League champion (2016); 2x Israeli Second Division champion (1991, 2002); 3x Dutch League champion (2005, 2008–2009); 2x Belgian Cup winner (2007, 2011)

Arik Shivek (Hebrew: אריק שיבק; born 10 September 1956) is an Israeli professional basketball coach.

Shivek is also the former head coach of the senior Israeli national basketball team, serving from 2009 to 2014, succeeding Zvi Sherf.

He coached ABC Amsterdam during the team's dynasty years, and won three Dutch national championships with the team. Shivek won the Israeli Premier League in 2016 with Hapoel Eilat.

== Coaching career ==
Shivek started coaching in 1983, with Maccabi Netanya, and later moved to clubs such as Maccabi Ra’anana, Maccabi Ramat Gan, and Hapoel Tel Aviv. Coach Shivek is known for his calm and composed behaviour on and off the court. Beginning in 2003, he coached the Amsterdam Ricoh Astronauts in the Netherlands, leading it to championships in 2008 and 2009, and the Antwerp Giants in Belgium.

He was the Coach of the Year in the Dutch Premier League in 2005 and 2009, and was named the league's Coach of the Year in 2008, by the website Eurobasket.com.

In December 2009, he was appointed as head basketball coach of the senior Israel national team. In June 2011, he re-signed as coach of Dexia Mons-Hainaut for a third straight year, subsequent to declining job offers from teams in France and Germany.

In the 2015–16 season, Shivek coached Israeli club Maccabi Rishon LeZion. He coached the team to its first Israeli championship, after beating powerhouses Maccabi Tel Aviv and Hapoel Jerusalem, on the way to the league title. On 27 February 2017, Shivek was fired.

On 16 May 2017, Shivek became the head coach of Maccabi Tel Aviv, for the Playoffs of the 2016–17 BSL season.

On 20 December 2017, Bnei Herzliya officially announced Shivek as their new head coach.

On 31 January 2019, Shivek returned to Bnei Herzliya for a second stint, signing for the rest of the season.

In May 2023, Shivek was hired as head coach of the Netherlands national team.

== Honours ==
- Israeli Super League (1):
  - 2016
- Israeli Second Division (2):
  - 1991, 2002
- Dutch League (3):
  - 2005, 2008, 2009
- Belgian Cup (2):
  - 2007, 2011
