= List of indoor arenas in Israel =

The following is a list of indoor arenas in Israel, ordered by capacity. The venues are by their final capacity after construction for seating-only events. There is more capacity if standing room is included (e.g. for concerts).

== Current arenas ==
Image	Stadium	Capacity	City	Team	Inaugurated
	Pais Arena	11,000	Jerusalem	Hapoel Jerusalem	2014
	Menora Mivtachim Arena	10,383	Tel Aviv	Maccabi Tel Aviv, Hapoel Tel Aviv	1963
	Expo Tel Aviv	9,628	Tel Aviv		2011
	Holon Toto Hall	5,500	Holon	Hapoel Holon	2015
	Romema Arena	5,000	Haifa	Maccabi Haifa, Hapoel Haifa	1976
	Shlomo Group Arena	3,504	Tel Aviv		2014
	Ashkelon Sports Arena	3,000	Ashkelon	Ironi Ashkelon	1999
	Conch Arena	3,000	Be'er Sheva	Hapoel Be'er Sheva	2013
	Beit Maccabi Arena	2,500	Rishon LeZion	Maccabi Rishon LeZion	2008
	HaKiriya Arena	2,200	Ashdod	Maccabi Ashdod	2008
	Gan Ner Sports Hall	2,057	Gan Ner	Hapoel Gilboa Galil	2008
	Malha Arena	2,000	Jerusalem		1985

== See also ==
- List of indoor arenas in Europe
- List of indoor arenas by capacity
- Lists of stadiums
