= Jalen Adams =

American basketball player (born 1995)

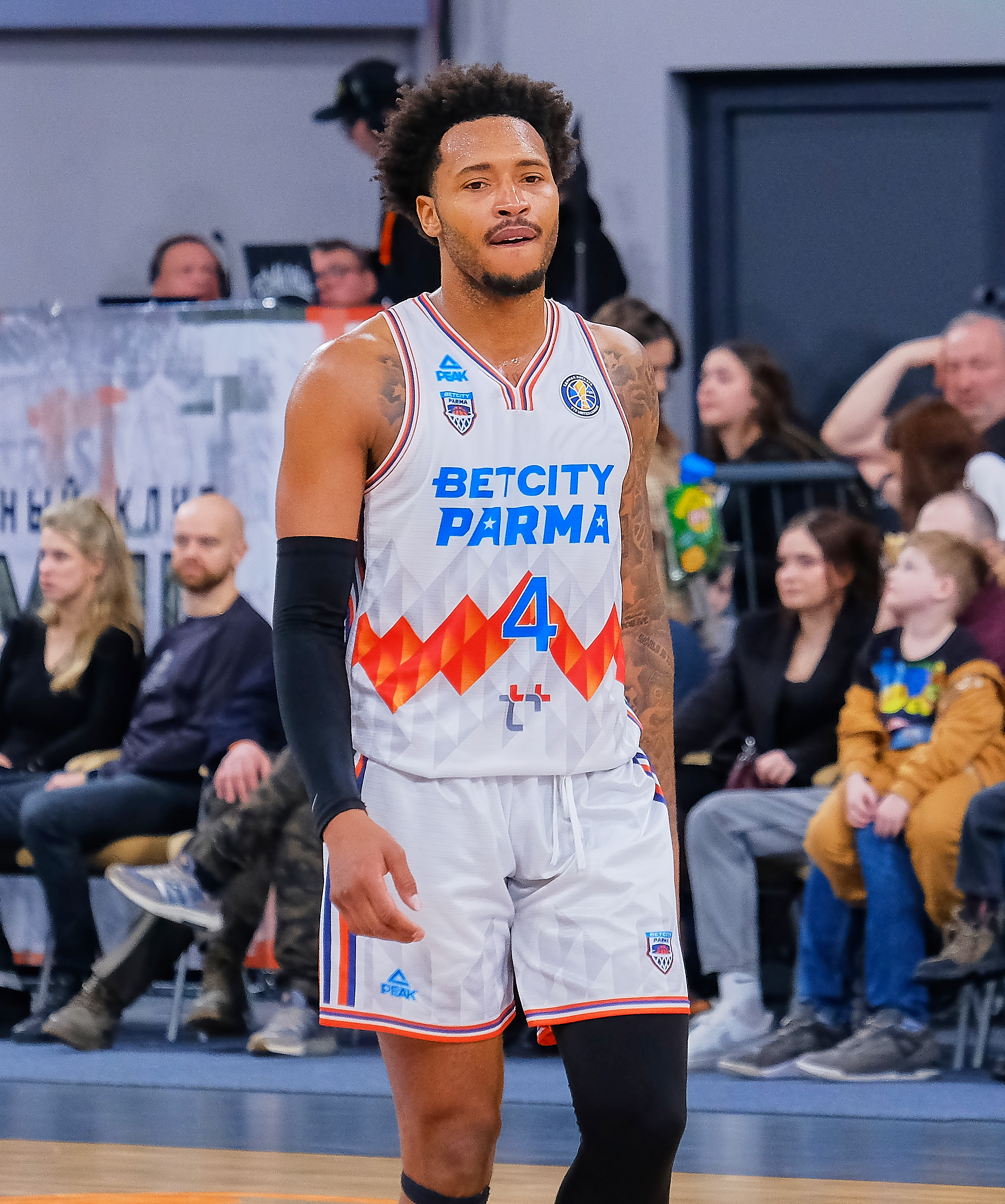
- Adams with Parma Basket in 2026

No. 4 – Sichuan Blue Whales
- Position: Point guard / shooting guard
- League: CBA

Personal information
- Born: December 11, 1995 (age 30) Roxbury, Massachusetts, U.S.
- Listed height: 6 ft 3 in (1.91 m)
- Listed weight: 195 lb (88 kg)

Career information
- High school: Melrose (Melrose, Massachusetts); Cushing Academy (Ashburnham, Massachusetts); Brewster Academy (Wolfeboro, New Hampshire)
- College: UConn (2015–2019)
- NBA draft: 2019: undrafted
- Playing career: 2019–present

Career history
- 2019–2020: Erie BayHawks
- 2020–2021: Champagne Châlons-Reims
- 2021: Erie BayHawks
- 2021–2022: Hapoel Jerusalem
- 2022–2023: Maccabi Tel Aviv
- 2023: Türk Telekom
- 2024: Beijing Ducks
- 2024–2025: Hapoel Holon
- 2025–2026: Parma Basket
- 2026–present: Sichuan Blue Whales

Career highlights
- Israeli League Sixth Man of the Year (2022); First-team All-AAC (2017); Second-team All-AAC (2018); Third-team All-AAC (2019)
- Stats at Basketball Reference

Jalen Rashad Adams (born December 11, 1995) is an American professional basketball player for the Sichuan Blue Whales of the Chinese Basketball Association (CBA). He played college basketball for the UConn Huskies.

== College career ==
Adams arrived at Connecticut with high expectations, as a top-30 recruit from Roxbury, Massachusetts. In the 2016 AAC tournament quarterfinals against Cincinnati, with 0.8 seconds left in triple overtime down 3 points, Adams made a three-quarter court shot to send the game to a fourth overtime; UConn won the game in four overtimes, and went on to win the AAC tournament. As a sophomore, Adams averaged 14.4 points and 6.1 assists per game on a team that finished 16–17.

Adams posted 18.1 points, 4.2 rebounds and 4.7 assists per game as a junior. As a senior, Adams averaged 16.9 points, 4.0 rebounds and 3.4 assists per game. His season was cut short due to an MCL sprain on his right knee suffered in an 81–63 loss to Temple in February 2019.

Adams is 12th all time on the UConn top scorers' list in 118 games played with 1,657 points scored in his collegiate career.

== Professional career ==
=== Erie BayHawks (2019–2020) ===
After going undrafted in the 2019 NBA draft, Adams joined the New Orleans Pelicans for the NBA Summer League. He was also signed to an Exhibit 10 contract with the Pelicans. On October 19, 2019, Adams was waived by the New Orleans Pelicans. On October 26, 2019, Adams was included in the training camp roster of the Erie BayHawks. On January 14, 2020, he posted 33 points, five assists, three rebounds and two steals in a 138–126 loss to the Maine Red Claws. Adams averaged 19 points and 4 rebounds per game.

=== Champagne Châlons-Reims Basket (2020–2021) ===
On June 10, 2020, Adams signed with Champagne Châlons-Reims Basket of the French LNB Pro A.

=== Erie BayHawks (2021) ===
On January 12, 2021, Adams was named to the opening night roster of the Erie BayHawks.

=== Hapoel Jerusalem (2021–2022) ===
On August 22, 2021, he signed with Hapoel Jerusalem of the Israeli Basketball Premier League.

=== Maccabi Tel Aviv (2022–2023) ===
On October 15, 2022, one day after Maccabi Tel Aviv had lost 86–71 to Fenerbahce, Adams joined his former club's (Hapoel Jerusalem) arch-rival. On April 3, 2023, Adams underwent surgery for a shoulder injury he had sustained earlier in the season and was subsequently ruled out for the rest of the 2022–23 campaign. In 23 EuroLeague games, he averaged 6.7 points, 1.4 rebounds and 1.4 assists per contest. Additionally, he averaged 12 points, 2.4 rebounds and 2.8 assists in the domestic league. On June 27, 2023, he parted ways with the Israeli powerhouse.

=== Türk Telekom (2023) ===
On June 27, 2023, Adams signed with Türk Telekom of the Turkish Basketbol Süper Ligi (BSL). On November 28, he parted ways with the club. In 15 games played (in the BSL and the EuroCup), Adams averaged 13.4 points, 2.8 rebounds, 3.3 assists and 1.7 steals per game.

=== Leones de Ponce (2024) ===
On March 22, 2024, Adams signed with the Leones de Ponce of the Baloncesto Superior Nacional.

=== Hapoel Holon (2024–2025) ===
On September 19, 2024, he signed with Hapoel Holon of the Israeli Basketball Premier League.

=== Parma-Pari Perm (2025-present) ===
On October 8, 2025, Adams received a Hoops Agents Player of the Week award after having the game-high 27 points, 7 rebounds and 5 assists in his team's victory.
