= Romema Arena =

Multi-purpose arena in Haifa, Israel

Coordinates: 32°47′15.62″N 34°59′49.48″E

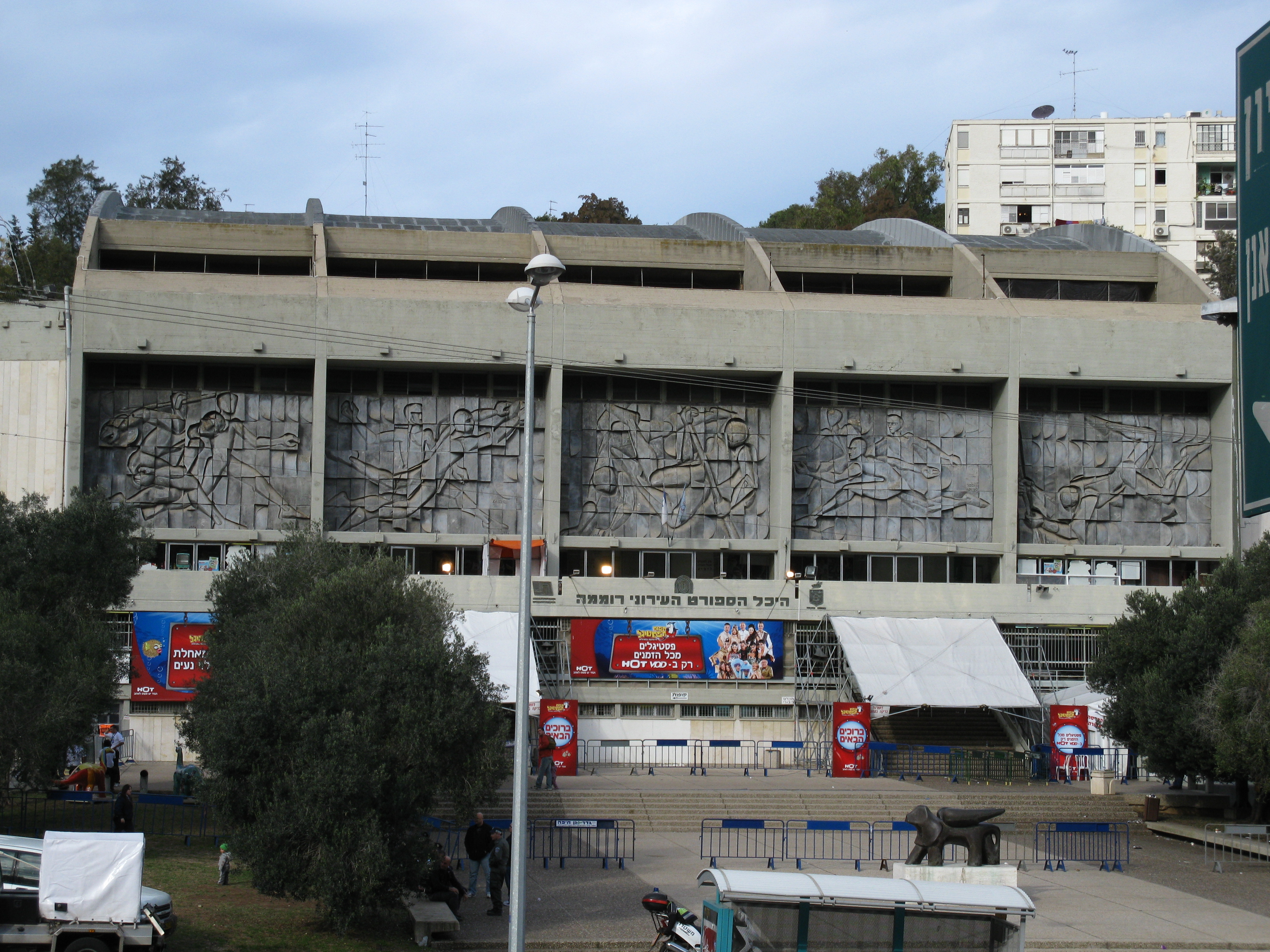
- Interactive map of Romema Arena
- Location: Haifa, Israel
- Owner: Haifa City Council
- Operator: Athos Ltd
- Capacity: Basketball: 5,000

Construction
- Opened: 1976
- Renovated: 2011/12
- Expanded: 2011/12

Tenants
- Hapoel Haifa; Maccabi Haifa

The Romema Arena (Hebrew: היכל הספורט העירוני רוממה) is a multi-purpose arena in Haifa, Israel. The arena is home to Hapoel Haifa basketball club and to Maccabi Haifa basketball club, a members of both the Hapoel Haifa and Maccabi Haifa sports clubs.

The arena was and is a home to various entertainment events, conventions, and major events in other sports. The arena is owned by the municipality of Haifa, and managed by Athos Ltd. - a company also fully owned by the municipality.

== History ==
Romema Arena was opened on 1976 in Southern Haifa, in order to serve both city major teams, Hapoel Haifa B.C. and Maccabi Haifa B.C.

Renovations were done during 2011–12 as 70 Million NIS ($17 Million) included a new atrium, cafes, screens, and a full hall remodel. Expansion of the original seating capacity of 2,500 was also done by adding a new East and West wings, adding another 2,500 seats. Romema Arena brought new life to the city and the team, also hosting the Israeli Basketball Cup Final this past summer in which Maccabi Haifa B.C. beat Israeli and European powerhouse Maccabi Tel Aviv to win their first Championship in club history. The venue currently hosts games of the EuroCup basketball tournament.

== Gallery ==
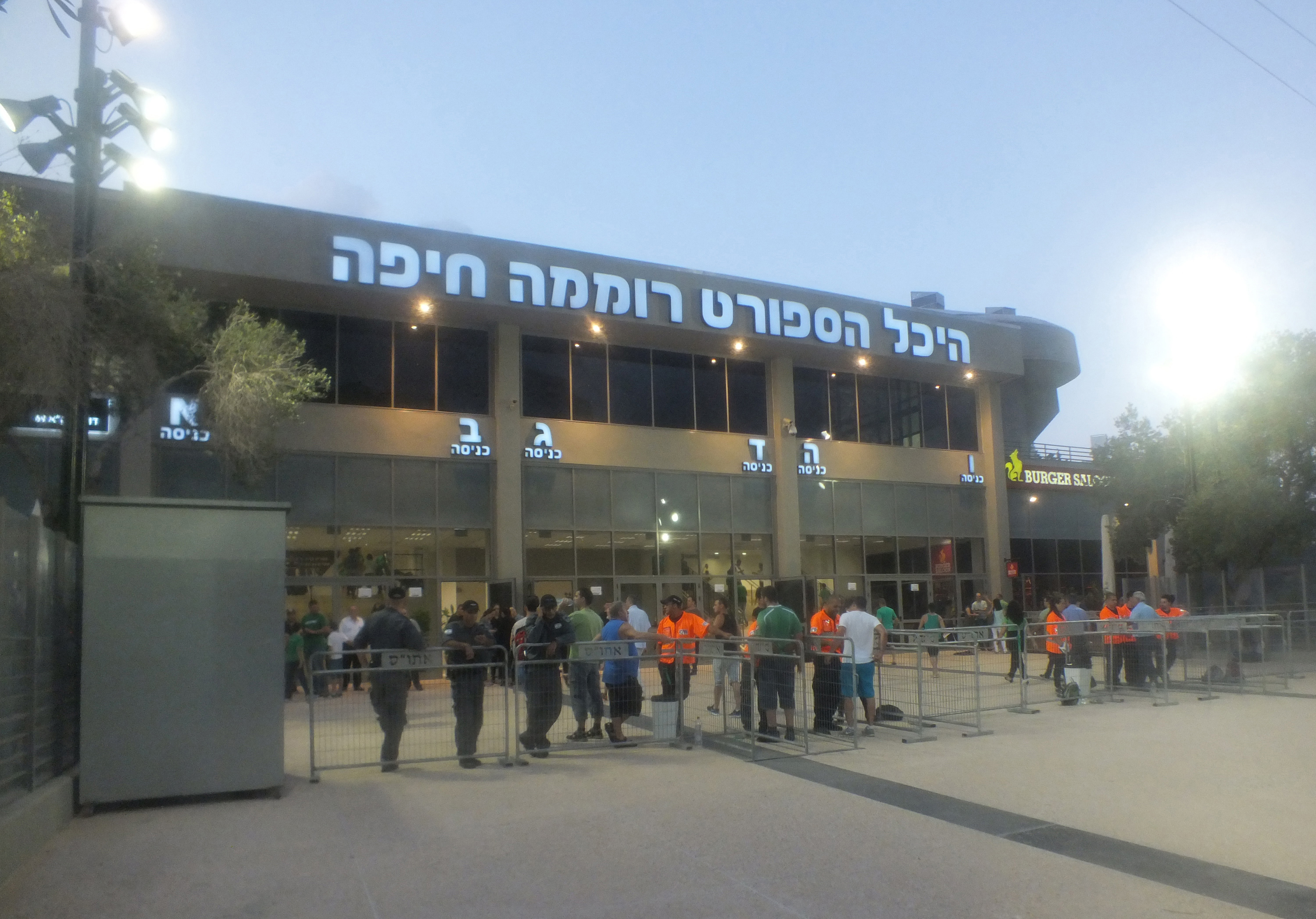
The arena after its renovation in the 2010s

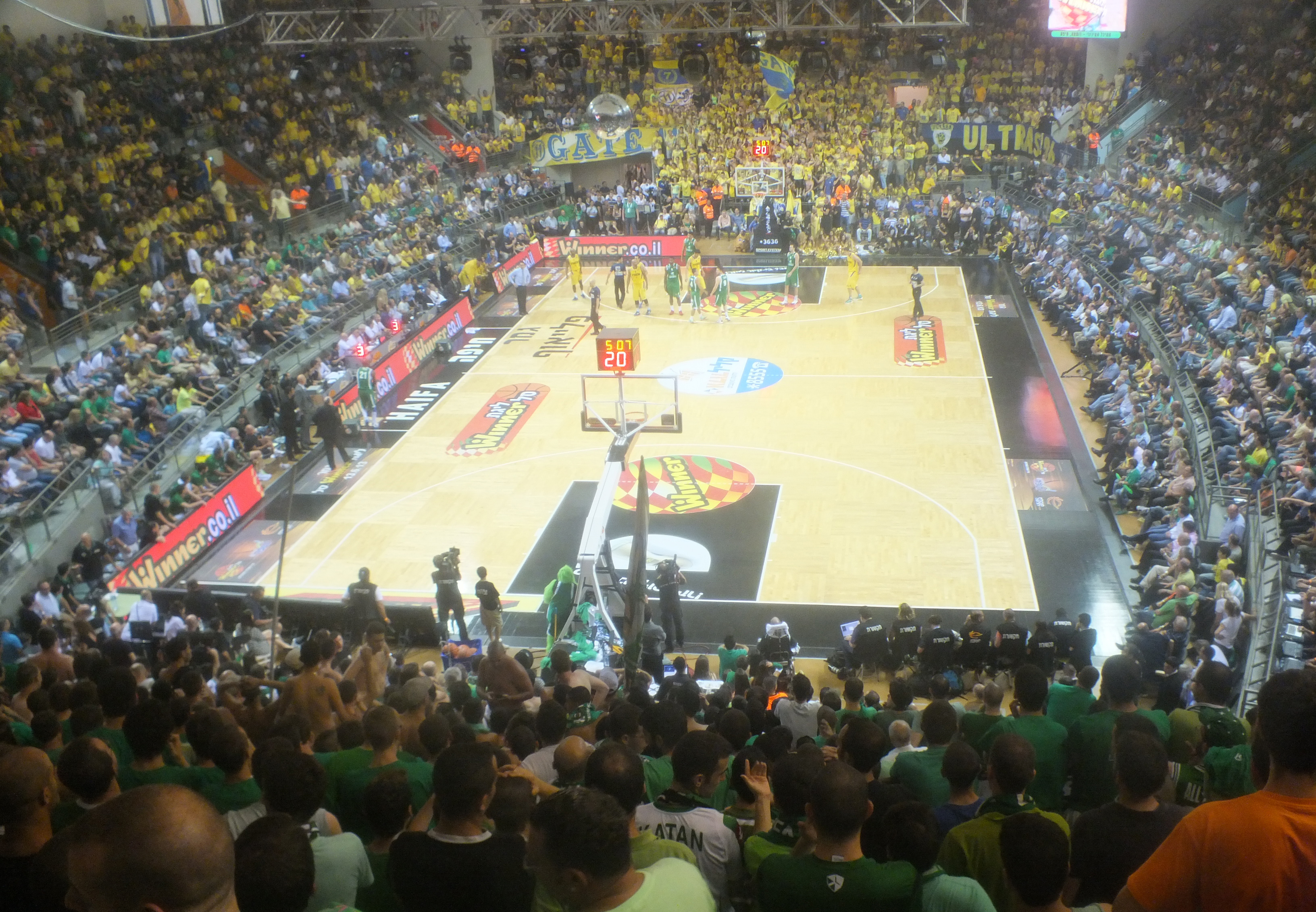
Hosting a basketball match

== See also ==
- List of indoor arenas in Israel
