= Effi Birnbaum =

Israeli professional basketball coach

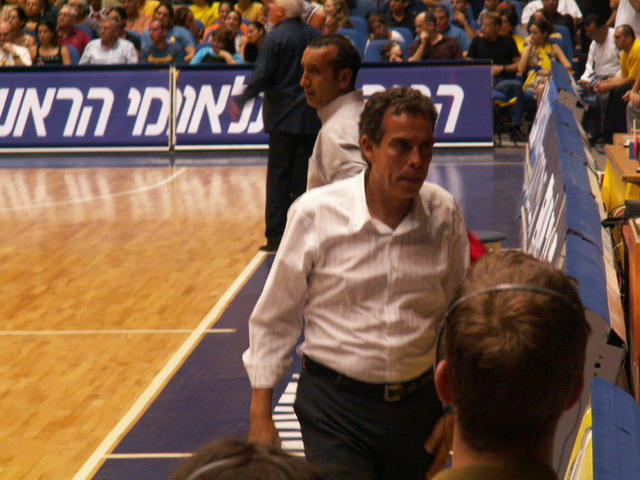
Effi Birnbaum

Efraim "Effi" Birnbaum (Hebrew: אפרים "אפי" בירנבאום; born 11 June 1954), is an Israeli professional basketball coach.

== Coaching career ==
In 2005, Birnbaum was named the Israeli Super League's Coach of the Year. He was the head coach of the Maccabi Tel Aviv for the beginning of the 2008–09 season, until he was terminated on November 24, 2008. From 2011 to 2012, Birnbaum was the head coach of the Maccabi Rishon LeZion. From 2013 to 2014, he was the head coach of the Bnei Herzliya.

== Clubs coached ==
Season(s)	Club
1981/82	Maccabi Petah Tikva
1982–83, 1983–84	Maccabi Ramat Gan (Assistant)
1984–85	Hapoel Ramat Gan (Assistant)
1985–86	Maccabi Ramat Gan (Assistant)
1986–87, 1987–88, 1988–89, 1989–90	Maccabi Ramat Gan
1990–91, 1991–92	Hapoel Holon
1992/93	Maccabi Ramat Gan
1993–94, 1994–95	Bnei Herzliya
1994–1997	Israeli National Team (Assistant)
1995–96	Hapoel Eilat
1996–97, 1997–98	Maccabi Ramat Gan
1998–99, 1999–2000	Hapoel Jerusalem
2000–01, 2001–02	Maccabi Haifa
2002–03	Bnei HaSharon
2003–04	Maccabi Givat Shmuel
2004–05, 2005–06	Hapoel Tel Aviv
2006–07, 2007–08	Bnei HaSharon
2008–09	Maccabi Tel Aviv
2009–10, 2010–11, 2011–12	Maccabi Rishon LeZion
2013–14	Bnei Herzliya
2016–17	Hapoel Tel Aviv (manager)
