= David Blatt =

Israeli-American basketball player and coach (born 1959)

David Blatt דוד מיכאל בלאט
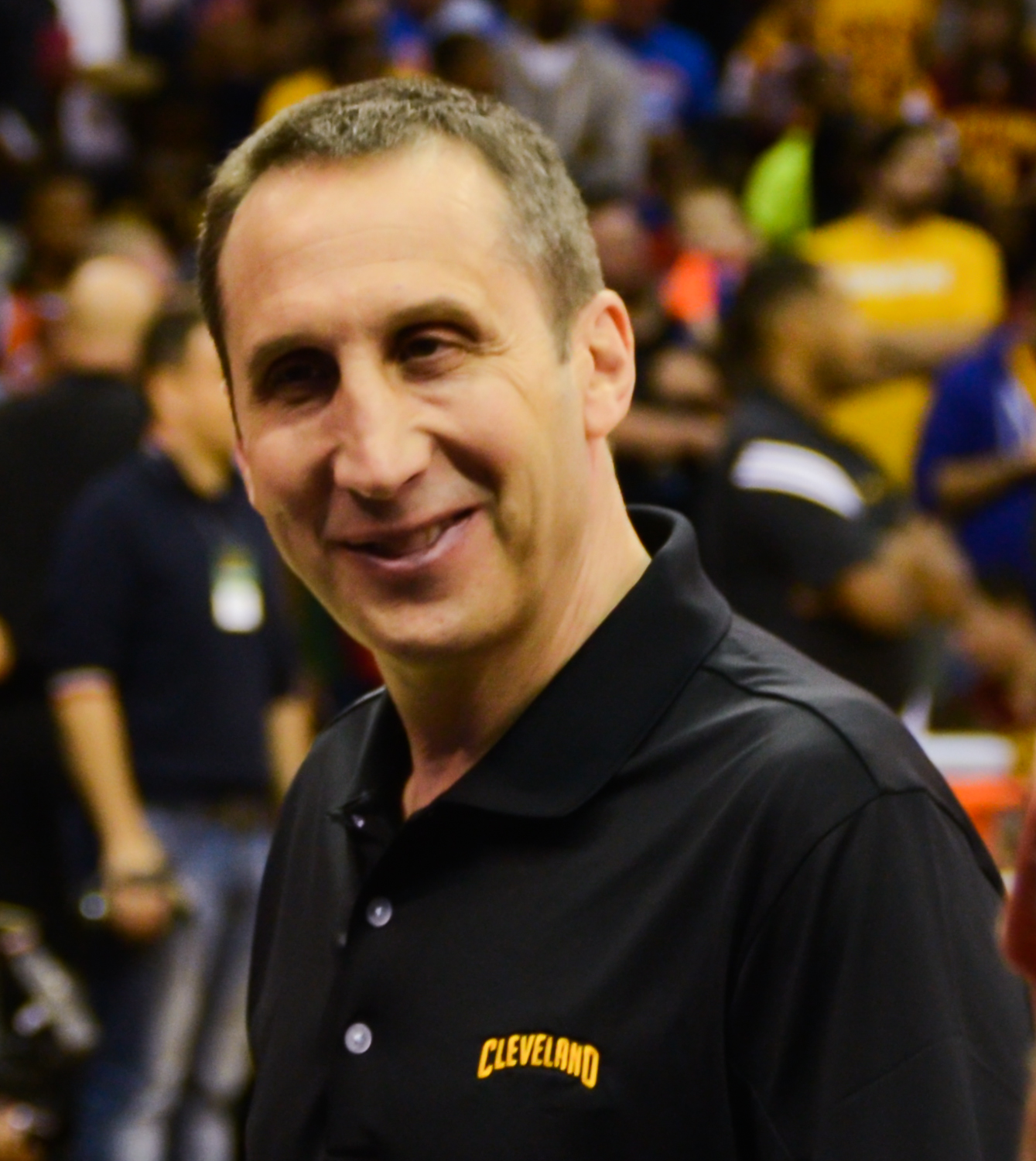
- Blatt as the head coach of the Cleveland Cavaliers in 2014 - 2016

Maccabi Tel Aviv
- Title: Counselor
- League: Ligat HaAl

Personal information
- Born: May 22, 1959 (age 67) Louisville, Kentucky, U.S.
- Listed height: 6 ft 3 in (1.91 m)

Career information
- High school: Framingham South (Framingham, Massachusetts)
- College: Princeton (1977–1981)
- NBA draft: 1981: undrafted
- Playing career: 1981–1993
- Position: Point guard
- Coaching career: 1993–2019

Career history

Playing
- 1981–1984: Maccabi Haifa
- 1986–1987: Hapoel Jerusalem
- 1987–1989: Maccabi Netanya
- 1989–1990: Hapoel Galil Elyon
- 1990–1991: Hapoel Jerusalem
- 1991–1992: Ironi Nahariya
- 1992–1993: Maccabi Hadera

Coaching
- 1993–1994: Hapoel Galil Elyon
- 1994–1995: Hapoel Galil Elyon (assistant)
- 1995–1999: Hapoel Galil Elyon
- 1999–2001: Maccabi Tel Aviv (assistant)
- 2001–2003: Maccabi Tel Aviv
- 2003–2004: Maccabi Tel Aviv (assistant)
- 2004–2005: Dynamo St. Petersburg
- 2005–2007: Benetton Treviso
- 2006–2012: Russia
- 2007–2008: Efes Pilsen
- 2008–2009: Dynamo Moscow
- 2010: Aris
- 2010–2014: Maccabi Tel Aviv
- 2014–2016: Cleveland Cavaliers
- 2016–2018: Darüşşafaka
- 2018–2019: Olympiacos

Career highlights
- As head coach: FIBA EuroBasket champion (2007); EuroLeague champion (2014); EuroCup champion (2018); FIBA EuroChallenge champion (2005); 5× Israeli Super League champion (2002, 2003, 2011, 2012, 2014); LBA champion (2006); ABA League champion (2012); Italian Cup winner (2007); 6× Israeli Cup winner (2002, 2003, 2011–2014); EuroLeague Coach of the Year (2014); Russian League Coach of the Year (2005); 4× Israeli Super League Coach of the Year (1996, 2002, 2011, 2014); Russian Federation Order of Friendship award recipient (2014); As assistant coach: 4× Israeli Basketball League champion (1993, 1999–2001); 3× Israeli Cup champion (1999–2001); SuproLeague champion (2001); EuroLeague champion (2004)
Medals
Men's basketball
Player representing United States
Maccabiah Games
Gold medal – first place	1981 Maccabiah
Head Coach representing Russia
Summer Olympic Games
Bronze medal – third place	2012 London
EuroBasket
Gold medal – first place	2007 Spain
Bronze medal – third place	2011 Lithuania

David Michael Blatt (Hebrew: דוד מיכאל בלאט; born May 22, 1959) is an Israeli-American professional basketball executive. He is also a former coach and player.

Blatt played point guard at Princeton University from 1977 to 1981 and played in the Maccabiah Games for the U.S. national team that won a gold medal in 1981. He then played professional basketball in Israel for nine of the next twelve years, before an injury ended his playing career, and he began coaching full-time.

He is one of the most successful Israeli-American coaches in European basketball history. As a coach, Blatt has been the Israeli Super League Coach of the Year four times (1996, 2002, 2011, and 2014), the Russian Super League Coach of the Year (2005), and the EuroLeague Coach of the Year (2014). Blatt took over as Cleveland's head coach, and led the team to the 2015 NBA Finals in his first season. He guided them to the top of their conference the next year, but was fired mid-season, and subsequently returned to coaching in Europe.

== Biography ==
Blatt is the son of inventor William F. Blatt (1927–2014) and Lillian (Siegal) Blatt (1930–1997), and is Jewish. He was born in Louisville, Kentucky and grew up in Framingham, Massachusetts. As a boy, he went to a Reform Temple, and until his Bar Mitzvah he attended Hebrew school twice a week. He says that in Israel he became "much more Jewish and much more Zionist."

In his sophomore year at Princeton, a coach for an Israeli kibbutz team recruited him to play in Israel for the summer. The summer at Kibbutz Gan Shmuel turned out to be a life-changing experience. Blatt graduated from Princeton in 1981 with a B.A. in English literature, completing his senior thesis on Bernard Malamud, author of The Natural.

In 1981 he immigrated to Israel, and served in the Israel Defense Forces on the Schneller military base. In 1991 Blatt married Kineret, from Netanya, Israel; she had played on an Israeli professional basketball team that he coached. They have four children: twin daughters Shani and Adi (who have served in the Israeli army), daughter Ela (his youngest child), and son Tamir Blatt (born in 1997; in 2014 he was the starting point guard on the Israeli junior national basketball team, and has played for Hapoel Tel Aviv, Hapoel Holon and Hapoel Jerusalem).

In 2023 he was chosen to light a torch at the beacon lighting ceremony on Mount Herzl on the occasion of the 75th year of the State of Israel.

== Playing career ==
Blatt played basketball at Framingham South High School, where he was also class president.

A point guard, Blatt played college basketball at Princeton University from 1977 to 1981 under coach Pete Carril with the Princeton Tigers, where he was team captain.

He also participated in the Maccabiah Games as part of the USA national team that won a gold medal in the 1981 Maccabiah Games. After competing in the Maccabiah, Blatt began to play professional basketball in Israel's Super League, and played 9 of the next 12 years in Israel before an injury ended his playing career and he started coaching full-time.

== Coaching career ==
After retiring from basketball as a player, Blatt became assistant manager for Hapoel Galil Elyon, coaching them for the 1993–94 season. In the middle of the season, the head coach was fired and Blatt took his place. The following year, he became Pini Gershon's assistant for the 1994–95 season. The next year, he won the title of Israeli Coach of the Year for 1996. In 1997, he continued coaching Hapoel Galil Elyon, while also becoming the assistant coach of the Israeli national team. For six years, he coached Russian national basketball team, winning the EuroBasket 2007.

Blatt returned to coach Galil Elyon, and remained assistant manager of the Israeli National Team for the next two years (1997–99). During his time in Galil Elyon Blatt notoriously assisted Pini Gershon, then head coach of Maccabi Tel Aviv, by relaying directions laid out during live broadcasts on national television of time outs of their rivals in the Israeli league finals series games.

=== European leagues and national head coach ===
For the 1999–2000 season, he moved to Maccabi Tel Aviv, and once again served as assistant manager to Pini Gershon. During that season, his team took part in the Israeli League and Israeli Cup (winning both), and also in the EuroLeague, where Maccabi finished in 2nd place.

In the years between 2000 and 2004, he continued as assistant coach under Pini Gershon and actively recruited foreign players such as Anthony Parker (in 2000) and Maceo Baston to the team. During those four years, Maccabi won one EuroLeague title, reached the EuroLeague Final Four (2001–02 season), and reached the final stage of the Adriatic League. Maccabi won the SuproLeague title in 2001 in Paris. Blatt was still working as assistant coach of the Israeli National Team in 2002, when he won the title of Israeli "Coach of the Year" for the second time, the year he was appointed head coach of Maccabi Tel Aviv.

Despite two years as head coach with all possible domestic titles and one EuroLeague Final Four appearance, for the 2003–04 season, he agreed to be demoted to assistant coach once again when Pini Gershon came back to the head coach position. Together they led one of the best teams in Maccabi Tel Aviv history, and the history of European basketball, to another EuroLeague title with a 44-point win in the final, as well as to the Israeli Championship and the Israeli Cup.

In 2004, he moved to Russia and signed on as head coach with Dynamo Saint Petersburg. During that year, he won the FIBA EuroCup championship with Dynamo and also the title of "Coach of the Year in Russia" (2004–05 season).

For the 2005–06 season, he signed on as head coach of the Israeli national team, but his appointment fell through due to the lack of a formal coaching certificate. He left Israel to become head coach of Benetton Treviso of the Italian league, and subsequently led them to the Italian Championship with a 3–1 victory in the final series of the Italian playoffs. In the same year, he was also appointed the head coach of the Russian national basketball team. At the beginning of the 2007–08 season, Blatt was appointed as a head coach of the Istanbul-based Turkish Super League team Efes Pilsen. However, on April 6, 2008, he parted ways with the team, due to poor results over the season. Blatt also coached the Russian national basketball team, with which he won the EuroBasket 2007 in a final game against the reigning world champions and home team of Spain, by a score of 60–59.

In 2008, with Ettore Messina announcing that he would leave CSKA Moscow, Blatt was considered to be the favorite to replace him, but Messina eventually stayed on as CSKA's coach and Blatt agreed to the offer to become the head coach of Dynamo Moscow instead. Although under contract for two seasons, he parted ways with the team, after requesting that from the team in order to pursue his career elsewhere. In early 2010, Blatt served a stint as the head coach of the Greek League club Aris, before moving on to coach Maccabi Tel Aviv once again. Blatt led the Russian national team to a bronze medal during the 2012 Summer Olympics.

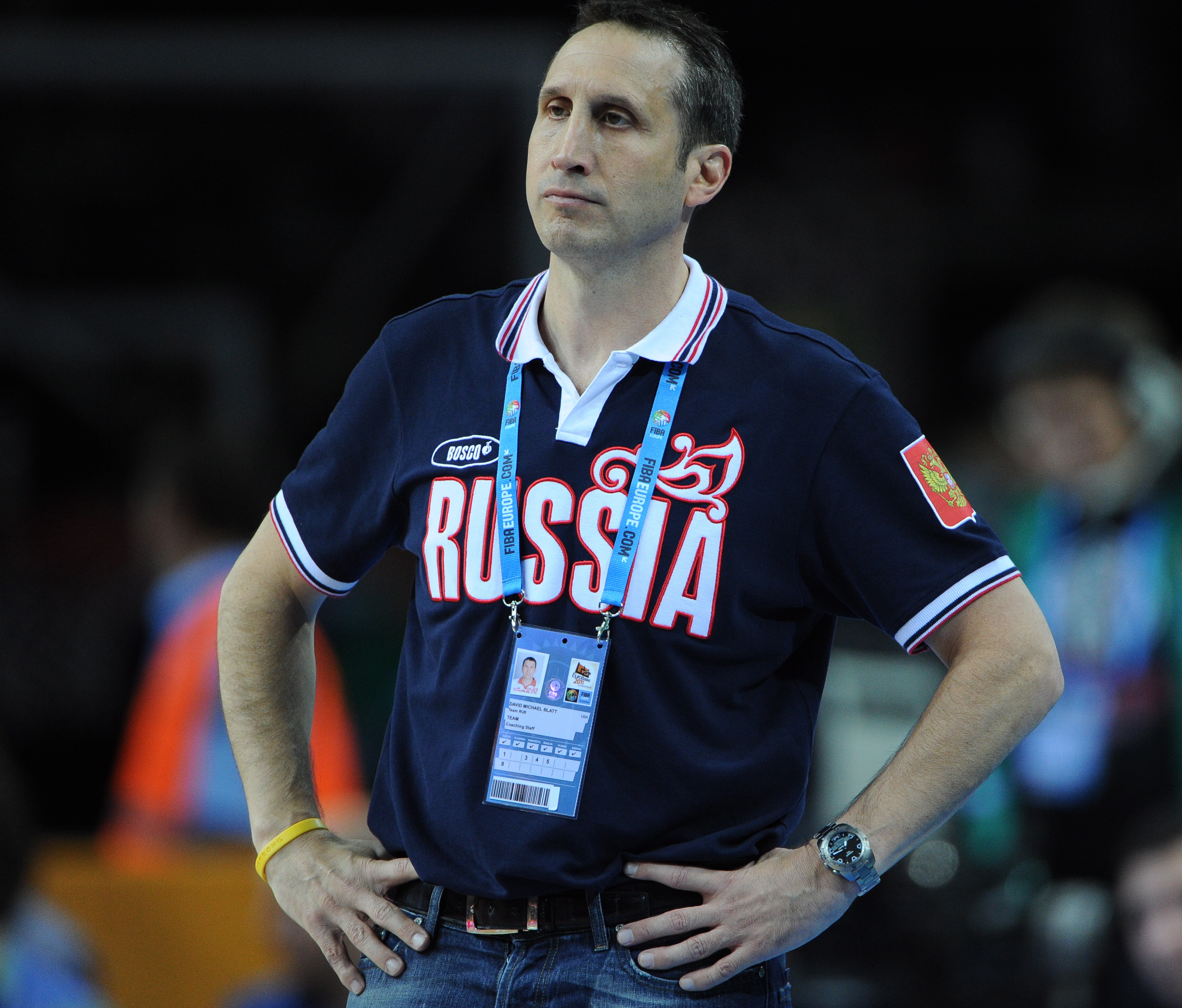
Blatt coaching the Russian national team in 2011

In 2014, Blatt led Maccabi Tel Aviv to one of the greatest comebacks against CSKA Moscow in the EuroLeague semifinal game, proceeding to win the championship after beating Real Madrid in overtime. In June, after his contract ended, Blatt officially parted ways with the club in order to seek an NBA coaching position. Over six seasons as Maccabi head coach, he compiled a 179–21 (.895) record in the Israeli League, and a record of 90–52 (.634) in the EuroLeague, for an overall record of 269–73 combined (.787). In 9 seasons, his career coaching record in the EuroLeague with Maccabi, Treviso, and Efes was 121–81 (.599).

=== NBA ===
On June 20, 2014, Blatt was hired as head coach of the Cleveland Cavaliers. Following his signing with the Cavaliers, Blatt was named the EuroLeague Coach of the Year.

On April 1, 2015, Blatt earned his first Eastern Conference Coach of the Month award. The Cavaliers led the Eastern Conference in March in points-per-game (107.0), points-per-game differential (9.1), field goal percentage (.469), three-point field goal percentage (.399) and three-pointers made per game (12.3). The Cavaliers were also 5–0 at home and tied for the most road wins in the East at 6–4. The month also saw the Cavaliers extend their winning streak at Quicken Loans Arena to 16 games (January 19 – March 29), which tied for the third-longest home streak in franchise history. Over the season, the Cavaliers led the Central Division with a 53–29 record, and Blatt's lifetime .639 winning percentage after the 2014–15 season was the best of any Cavaliers coach in team history.

During the Eastern Conference Semifinals, Blatt attempted to call a timeout when the Cavs did not have any left. This would have given the Cavaliers a technical foul, but the referees did not see the attempted timeout and the Cavaliers won the game, tying the series 2–2, and eventually winning the series. In Blatt's first season, the Cavaliers won the Eastern Conference title, their first since 2007. While other rookie head coaches have reached the NBA Finals, Blatt and rival coach Steve Kerr of the Golden State Warriors were the first pair of rookie NBA coaches to face each other in the NBA Finals since the first year of the NBA's existence, in 1947. The Cavaliers eventually lost 4–2 to the Warriors in the Finals.

On January 22, 2016, the Cavaliers fired Blatt. Although the team held the best record in their conference (30–11), general manager David Griffin cited "a lack of fit with our personnel and our vision" as the reason for the decision. Blatt was replaced by his lead assistant Tyronn Lue, who guided the Cavaliers to their first NBA championship that season.

Even though Blatt only coached the first half of the championship season, the Cavaliers' officials sent him a 2016 NBA Championship ring. At first he declined their offer but later changed his mind and accepted it.

=== Return to Europe ===
On June 1, 2016, Blatt was named the new head coach for Darüşşafaka of the Turkish Super League and the EuroLeague. In his first season with Darüşşafaka, Blatt coached the team to the EuroLeague quarterfinals, where they eventually lost 1–3 to Real Madrid. In the Turkish Super League, Darüşşafaka was eliminated in the semifinals by Fenerbahçe.

In his second season with Darüşşafaka, Blatt won the 2018 EuroCup Championship, becoming only the second coach in history (after Dusan Ivkovic) who won Euroleague (with Maccabi in 2014), EuroBasket (with Russia in 2007), EuroCup and Olympic medals (bronze with Russia in 2012).

On June 27, 2018, Blatt was officially named the head coach for Olympiacos of the Greek Basket League and the EuroLeague, signing a two-year contract. On October 6, 2019, Blatt parted ways with Olympiacos after one season, announcing he had been diagnosed with PPMS and was currently in treatment for the degenerative condition, which will affect him the rest of his life.

== Executive career ==
On December 18, 2019, Blatt announced his retirement from coaching after the New York Knicks hired him as a consultant.

Blatt's contract was not renewed after the 19–20 season.

On May 28, 2020, through the Israeli company True Player Group (50% of the shares are owned by the Blatt family), he became co-owner of Czech basketball club BC Brno.

During the 2022–23 Israeli Basketball Premier League, Blatt served as a consultant for Maccabi Tel Aviv.

During the 2023 FIBA Basketball World Cup he served as a consultant for the Canadian national basketball team.

During the upcoming season, Blatt will serve as a consultant for the Arizona Wildcats.

== Coaching record ==
Legend
G	Games coached	W	Games won	L	Games lost	W–L %	Win-loss %

Note: The EuroLeague is not the only competition in which the team played during the season. He also coached in domestic competition, and regional competition if applicable.

=== EuroLeague ===
Team	Year	G	W	L	W–L%	Result
Maccabi Tel Aviv	2001–02	21	13	8	.619	Lost in Semifinals
Maccabi Tel Aviv	2002–03	20	11	9	.550	Eliminated in Top 16
Benetton Treviso	2005–06	20	11	9	.550	Eliminated in Top 16
Benetton Treviso	2006–07	20	11	9	.550	Eliminated in Top 16
Efes Pilsen	2007–08	20	9	11	.450	Eliminated in Top 16
Maccabi Tel Aviv
Maccabi Tel Aviv	2010–11	22	16	6	.727	Lost in Final
Maccabi Tel Aviv	2011–12	21	12	9	.571	Lost in Quarterfinals
Maccabi Tel Aviv	2012–13	27	16	11	.593	Lost in Quarterfinals
Maccabi Tel Aviv	2013–14	30	21	9	.700	Won EuroLeague Championship
Darüşşafaka	2016–17	30	16	14	.533	Lost in Quarterfinals
Olympiacos	2018–19	30	15	15	.500	Eliminated in regular season
Career		276	169	122	.581	

=== NBA ===
Team	Year	G	W	L	W–L%	Finish	PG	PW	PL	PW–L%	Result
Cleveland	2014–15	82	53	29	.646	1st in Central	20	14	6	.700	Lost in NBA Finals
Cleveland	2015–16	41	30	11	.732	(fired)	—	—	—	—	—
Career		123	83	40	.675		20	14	6	.700	

== Awards and honors ==
- EuroBasket 2007: Gold
- EuroBasket 2011: Bronze
- 2012 Olympics: Bronze
- 2014 EuroLeague champion
- 2014 EuroLeague Coach of the Year
- 2014 Order of Friendship Award winner
- 2018 EuroCup champion
- 2020 Bonei Zion Prize in the field of Culture, Art & Sports.

== See also ==
- Sports in Israel
- List of select Jewish basketball players
- List of foreign NBA coaches
- List of EuroLeague-winning head coaches
- List of FIBA EuroBasket winning head coaches
- List of ABA League-winning coaches
