= Conch Arena =

Sports arena in Be'er Sheva, Israel

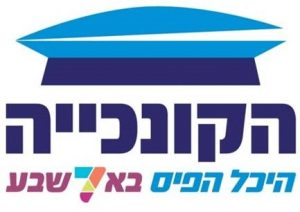

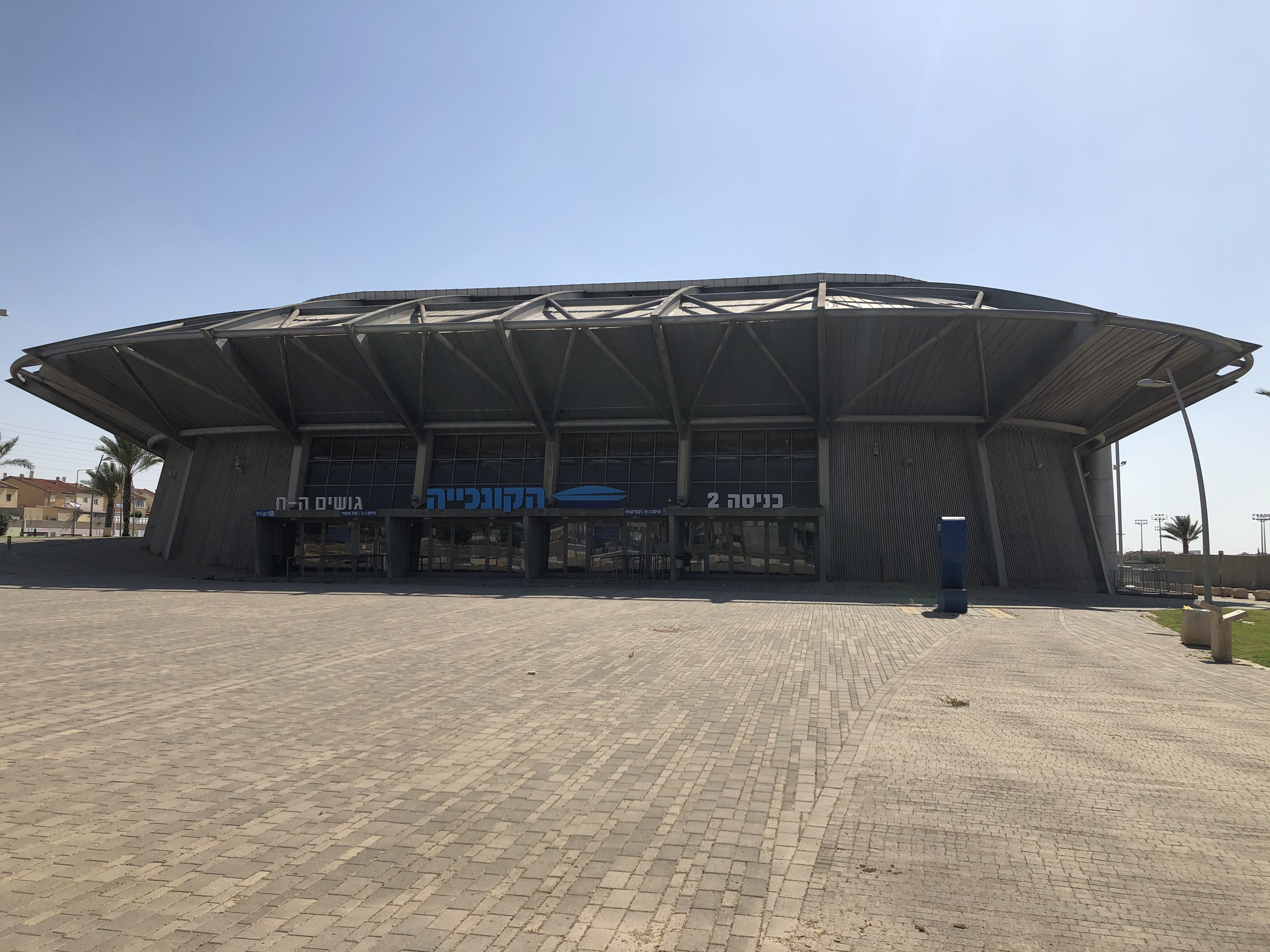
- Interactive map of Conch Arena
- Location: Be'er Sheva, Israel
- Coordinates: 31°16′18.44″N 34°46′38.86″E
- Owner: City of Be'er Sheva
- Operator: City of Be'er Sheva
- Capacity: 3,000
- Surface: Parquet

Construction
- Groundbreaking: December 2011
- Opened: December 2013
- Cost: NIS 50 million EUR € 10 million

Tenants
- Hapoel Be'er Sheva (Basketball); F.C. Be'er Sheva (Handball)

Conch Arena (Hebrew: אולם הקונכייה, Ulam HaKunchiya) is a multi-purpose sports arena that was built in Be'er Sheva, Israel, by the city council and National Lottery grant of Mifal HaPais. The arena is located in Be'er Sheva's Sports Quarter, on Etsel Street, adjacent to the Turner Stadium. The arena's capacity is 3,000 seats.

== History ==
Conch Arena, opened its doors in December 2013, performances of the festival and 25 February 2014 he was inaugurated, by Rubik Danilovich, the mayor of Be'er Sheva, Shmuel Frenkel, chairman of BSL, and Isaac Larry, Chairman of Wiener ago the traditional All-Star game in the Premier League.

== See also ==
- List of indoor arenas in Israel
