= Israeli Basketball Premier League Coach of the Year =

The Israeli Basketball Premier League Coach of the Year, or Israeli Basketball Super League Coach of the Year, is an award given to the best head coach of each season of the Israeli Basketball Premier League, which is the top-tier level men's professional basketball league in Israel.

== Winners ==
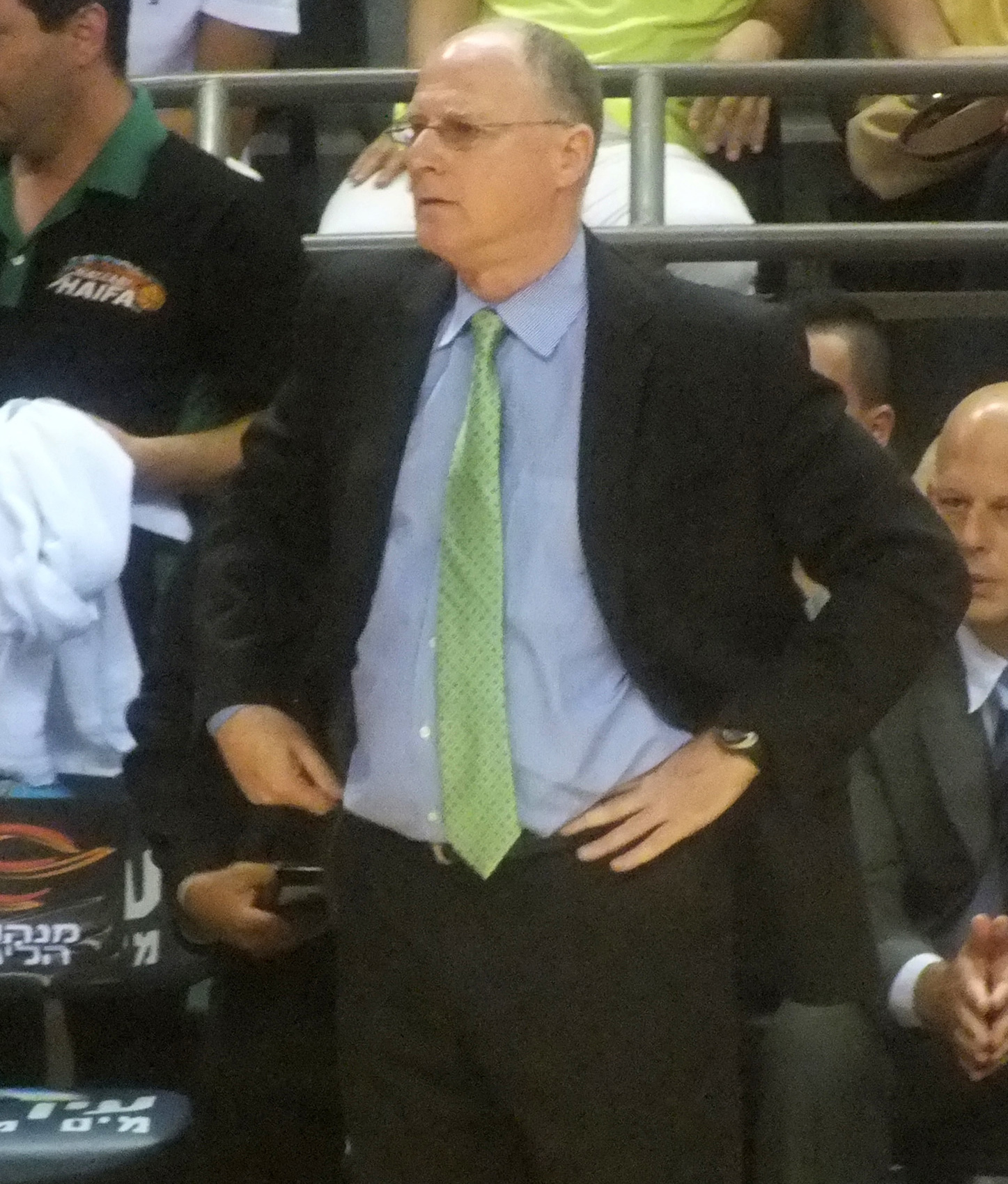
Brad Greenberg

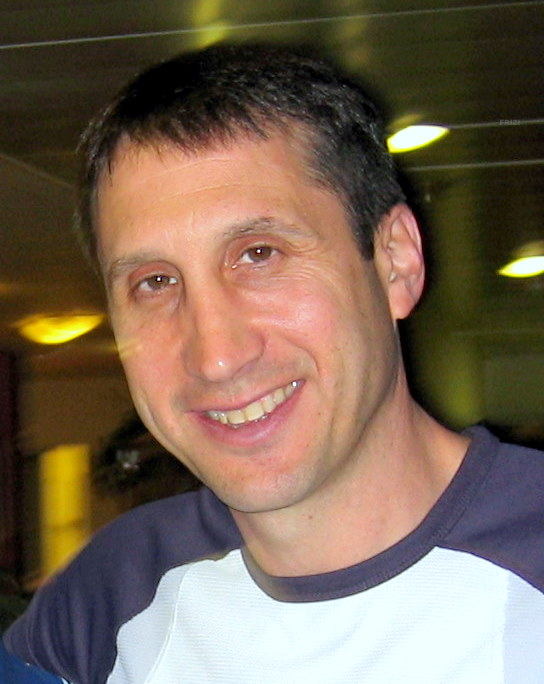
David Blatt

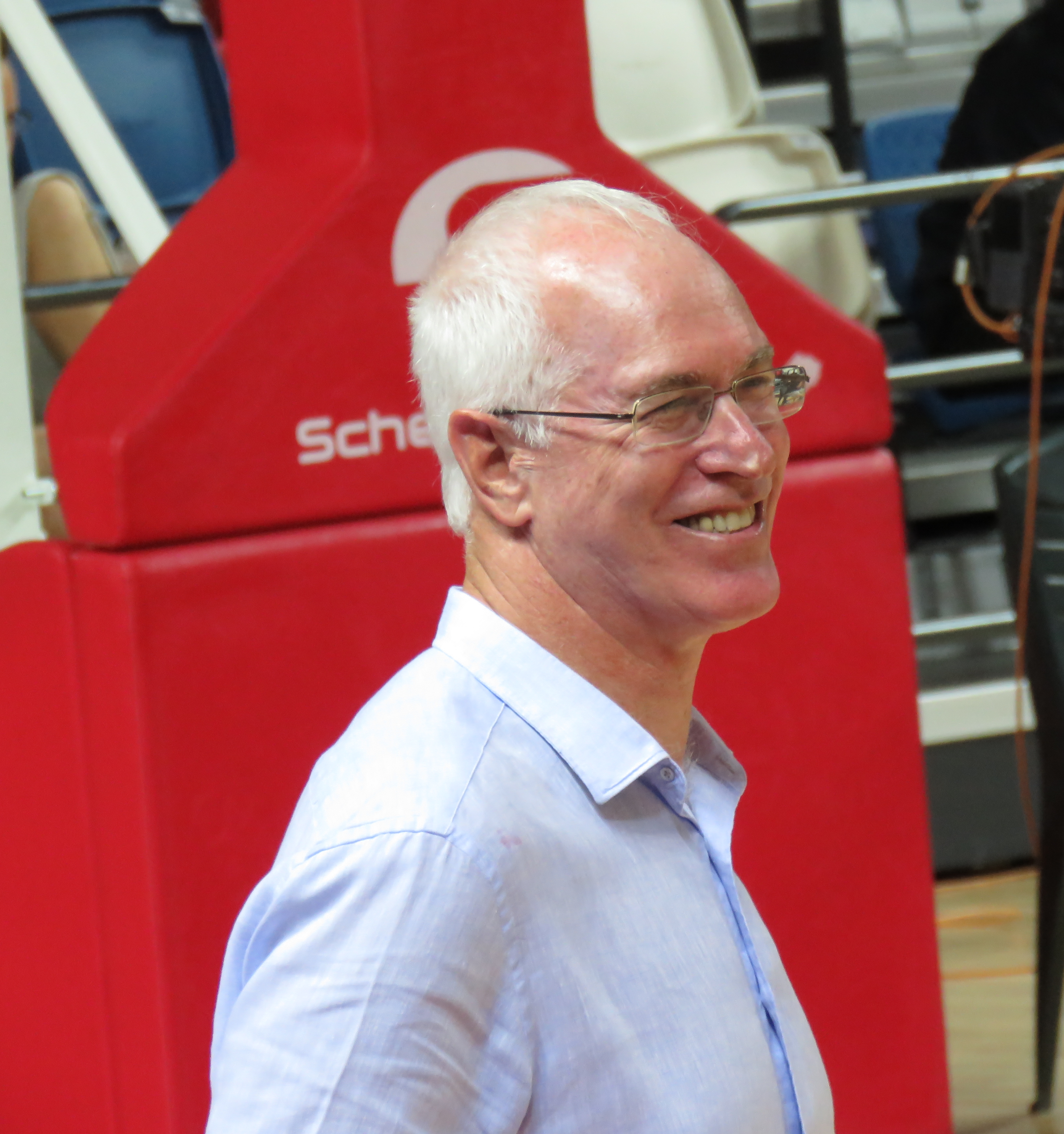
Arik Shivek

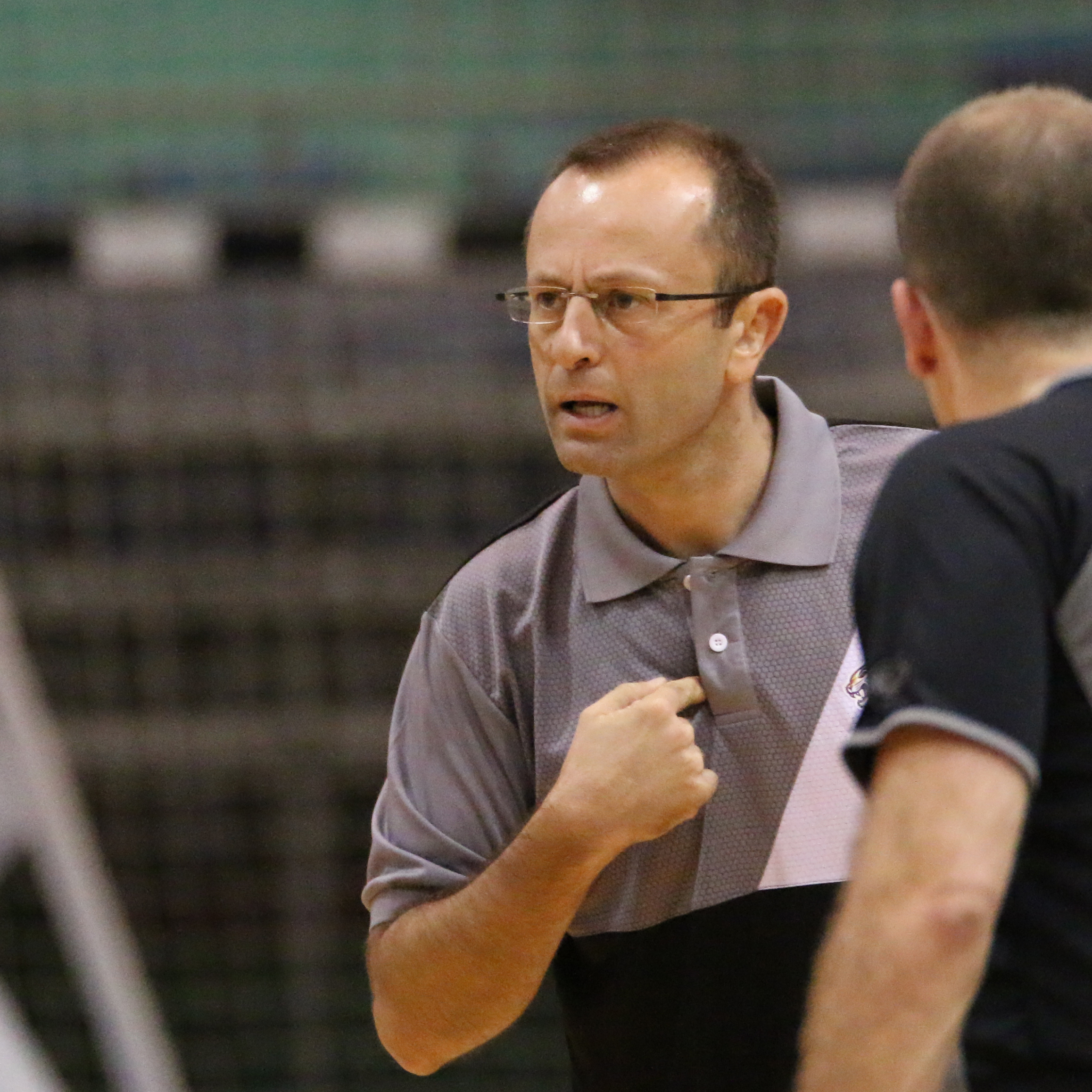
Dan Shamir

Season	Coach of the Year	Team
1989–90	(Israel) Yoram Harush	Hapoel Jerusalem
1990–91	(Israel) Moshe Weinkrantz	Maccabi Rishon LeZion
1991–92	(Israel) Muli Katzurin	Hapoel Galil Elyon
1992–93	(Israel) Pini Gershon	Hapoel Galil Elyon
1993–94	(Israel) Meir Kaminsky	Beitar Ramat Gan
1994–95	(Israel) Hanoch Mintz	Hapoel Gvat/Yagur
1995–96	(Israel) (United States) David Blatt	Hapoel Galil Elyon
1996–97	(Israel) Arik Shivek	Maccabi Ra'anana
1997–98	(Israel) Arik Shivek (2×)	Maccabi Ra'anana
1998–99	(Israel) Effi Birnbaum	Hapoel Jerusalem
1999–00	(Israel) Sharon Drucker	Maccabi Ra'anana
2000–01	(Israel) Erez Edelstein	Hapoel Galil Elyon
2001–02	(Israel) (United States) David Blatt (2×)	Maccabi Tel Aviv
2002–03	(Israel) Ariel Beit-Halahmy	Elitzur Givat Shmuel
2003–04	(Israel) Ya'akov Jino	Bnei Herzliya
2004–05	(Israel) Effi Birnbaum (2×)	Hapoel Tel Aviv
2005–06	(Israel) Ofer Berkovich	Elitzur Givat Shmuel
2006–07	(Israel) Oded Kattash	Hapoel Galil Elyon
2007–08	(Israel) Miki Dorsman	Hapoel Holon
2008–09	(Israel) Avi Ashkenazi	Maccabi Haifa
2009–10	(Israel) Eric Alfasi	Barak Netanya
2010–11	(Israel) (United States) David Blatt (3×)	Maccabi Tel Aviv
2011–12	(Israel) Ofer Berkovich (2×)	Maccabi Ashdod
2012–13	(United States) Brad Greenberg	Maccabi Haifa
2013–14	(Israel) (United States) David Blatt (4×)	Maccabi Tel Aviv
2014–15	(Israel) Danny Franco	Hapoel Jerusalem
2015–16	(Israel) Arik Shivek (3×)	Maccabi Rishon LeZion
2016–17	(Italy) Simone Pianigiani	Hapoel Jerusalem
2017–18	(Israel) Dan Shamir	Hapoel Holon
2018–19	(Greece) Ioannis Sfairopoulos	Maccabi Tel Aviv
2019–20	(Greece) Ioannis Sfairopoulos (2×)	Maccabi Tel Aviv
2020–21	(Greece) Stefanos Dedas	Hapoel Holon
2021–22	(Israel) Oren Aharoni	Bnei Herzliya
2022–23	(Serbia) Aleksandar Džikić	Hapoel Jerusalem
2023–24	(Israel) Sharon Avrahami	Ironi Kiryat Ata
2024–25	(Greece) Dimitrios Itoudis	Hapoel Tel Aviv
2025–26	(Israel) Oded Kattash (2×)	Maccabi Tel Aviv
