= Oren Aharoni =

Israeli basketball player and coach

Oren Aharoni אורן אהרוני
Hapoel Eilat
- Title: Head coach
- League: Israeli Basketball Premier League

Personal information
- Born: November 12, 1973 (age 53)
- Listed height: 6 ft 3 in (1.91 m)

Career information
- College: FIU (1995–1996)
- Position: Guard

Career history

Coaching
- 2026–present: Hapoel Eilat

Career highlights
- As head coach: Israeli State Cup winner (2022); IBPL Coach of the Year (2022)

Oren Aharoni (Hebrew: אורן אהרוני; born November 12, 1973) is an Israeli basketball coach and former professional player. He currently serves as the head coach for Hapoel Eilat of the Israeli Basketball Premier League. Aharoni played the guard position, played in the Premier League, and was part of the Israeli national team.

== Biography ==
Aharoni is 6 ft 3 in (191 cm) tall.

He attended Florida International University for one year ('96). Aharoni played for the Florida International Panthers in his freshman year in 1996–96. He holds the FIU freshman record in three-point field goals (49), and is 4th of all FIU freshmen all time in assists (58), and tied for 8th in steals (31).

Aharoni played in the Israeli Basketball Premier League. Between 1991 and 2007 he played for Israeli teams Hapoel Holon, Ironi Nahariya, Ironi Ramat Gan, Hapoel Eilat, Maccabi Haifa, and Elitzur Givat Shmuel (as captain).

He also played on the Israeli national basketball team. Aharoni played in the 1992 FIBA European Championship for Junior Men, 1994 FIBA European Championship for Men '22 and Under', and 1997 FIBA European Championship for Men.

Aharoni has been Head Coach of the Israeli National Team U16, U18, and U20 Men's teams since 2009. He has also been General Manager of Maccabi Teddy Tel Aviv Youth Departments since 2011.
