= Israeli Basketball Premier League Statistical Leaders =

The Israeli Basketball Premier League Statistical Leaders, or Israeli Basketball Super League Statistical Leaders, are the stats leaders of the top-tier level men's professional club basketball league in Israel, the Israeli Premier Basketball League.

== Statistical leaders by season ==
=== Scoring leaders by total points scored (1953–54 to 1988–89) ===
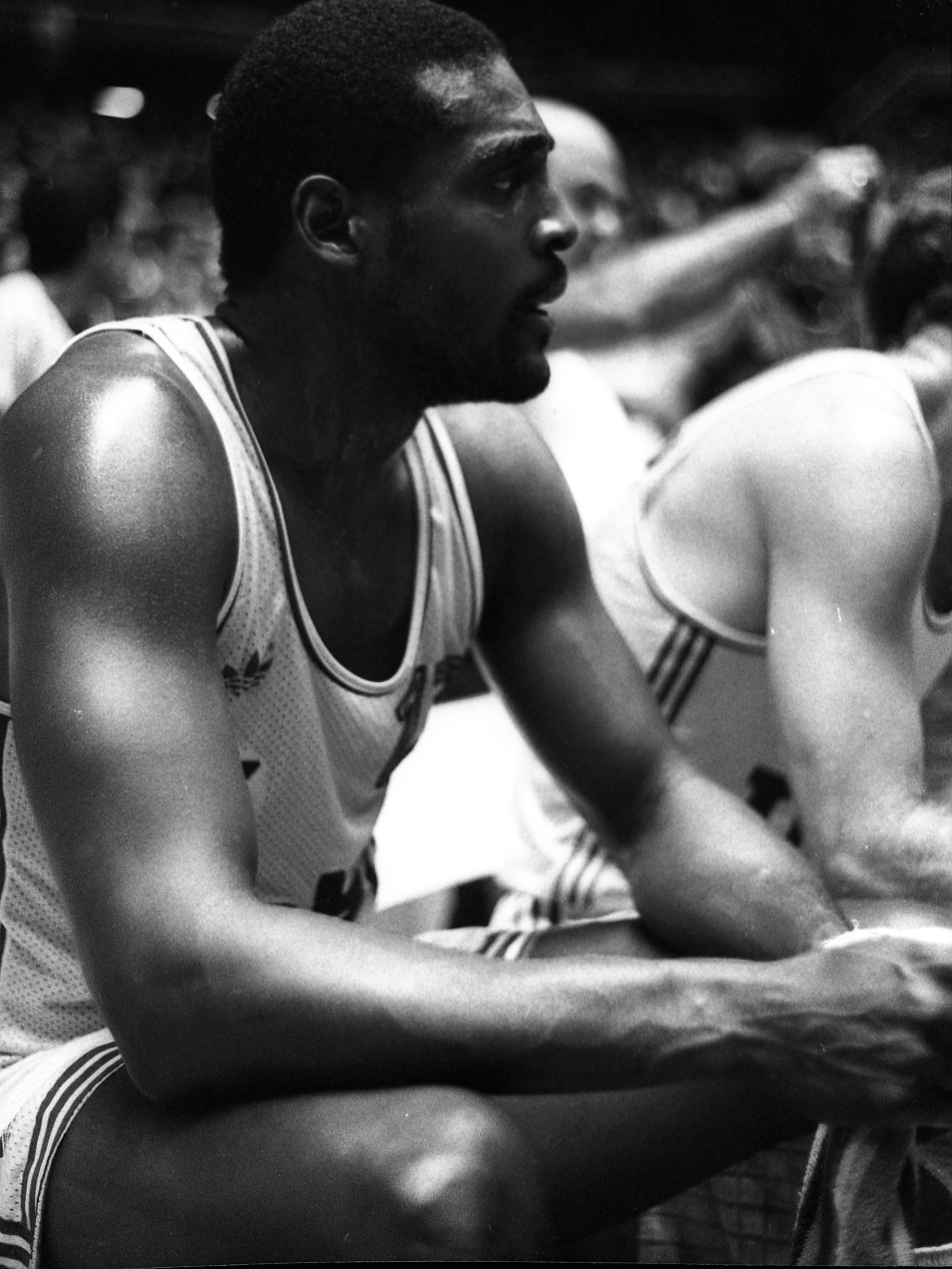
Kevin Magee

From the start of the Israeli Premier League, in the 1953–54 season, through the 1988–89 season, the Top Scorer of the league was the player that had the most total points scored in the league, in a given season.

| Season | Player | Team | Points | Ref. |
|---|---|---|---|---|
| 1953–54 | (Israel) Abraham Shneior | Maccabi Tel Aviv | 197 | |
| 1954–55 | (Israel) Freddy Cohen | Hapoel Holon | 413 | |
| 1955–56 | Cancelled due to war | | | |
| 1956–57 | (Israel) Amos Kupfer-Toval | Hapoel Holon | 262 | |
| 1957–58 | (Israel) Reuben Babinder | Maccabi Petah Tikva | 384 | |
| 1958–59 | (Israel) Abraham Hoffman | Maccabi Jerusalem | 468 | |
| 1959–60 | (Israel) Abraham Hemmo | Hapoel Haifa | 487 | |
| 1960–61 | (Israel) Ofer Eshed | Hapoel Holon | 484 | |
| 1961–62 | (Israel) Ofer Eshed (2×) | Hapoel Holon | 478 | |
| 1962–63 | (Israel) Ofer Eshed (3×) | Hapoel Holon | 481 | |
| 1963–64 | (Israel) Shlomo Lutsky | Maccabi Petah Tikva | 578 | |
| 1964–65 | (Israel) Ofer Eshed (4×) | Hapoel Holon | 580 | |
| 1965–66 | (Israel) Chaim Buchbinder | Maccabi Haifa | 642 | |
| 1966–67 | (Israel) Ofer Eshed (5×) | Hapoel Holon | 580 | |
| 1967–68 | (Israel) Chaim Buchbinder (2×) | Maccabi Haifa | 791 | |
| 1968–69 | (Israel) Chaim Buchbinder (3×) | Maccabi Haifa | 719 | |
| 1969–70 | (Israel) Ofer Eshed (6×) | Hapoel Holon | 658 | |
| 1970–71 | (Israel) Gabi Teichner | Hapoel Nir-David | 617 | |
| 1971–72 | (Israel) Gabi Teichner (2×) | Hapoel Nir-David | 684 | |
| 1972–73 | (Israel) Zvi Inbar | Ha'poel Kiryat Haim | 650 | |
| 1973–74 | (Israel) (United States) Steve Kaplan | Hapoel Ramat Gan | 654 | |
| 1974–75 | (Israel) (United States) Steve Kaplan (2×) | Hapoel Ramat Gan | 742 | |
| 1975–76 | (Israel) (United States) Steve Kaplan (3×) | Hapoel Ramat Gan | 678 | |
| 1976–77 | (Israel) (United States) Steve Kaplan (4×) | Hapoel Ramat Gan | 486 | |
| 1977–78 | (Israel) (United States) Steve Kaplan (5×) | Hapoel Ramat Gan | 789 | |
| 1978–79 | (Israel) Boaz Janay | Hapoel Gvat/Yagur | 540 | |
| 1979–80 | (The Bahamas) Kendal Pinder | Hapoel Jerusalem | 586 | |
| 1980–81 | (Israel) (United States) Darryl Robinson | Beitar Tel Aviv | 612 | |
| 1981–82 | (Israel) Doron Jamchi | Maccabi Ramat Gan | 590 | |
| 1982–83 | (United States) Ernie Cobb | Elitzur Tel Aviv | 599 | |
| 1983–84 | (Israel) Doron Jamchi (2×) | Maccabi Ramat Gan | 589 | |
| 1984–85 | (Israel) Doron Jamchi (3×) | Maccabi Ramat Gan | 763 | |
| 1985–86 | (United States) Kevin Magee | Maccabi Tel Aviv | 555 | |
| 1986–87 | (United States) Ron Davis | Beitar Tel Aviv | 697 | |
| 1987–88 | (United States) Mark Simpson | Beitar Tel Aviv | 661 | |
| 1988–89 | (United States) Kevin Magee (2×) | Maccabi Tel Aviv | 596 | |

=== Scoring leaders by points per game (1988–89 to present) ===
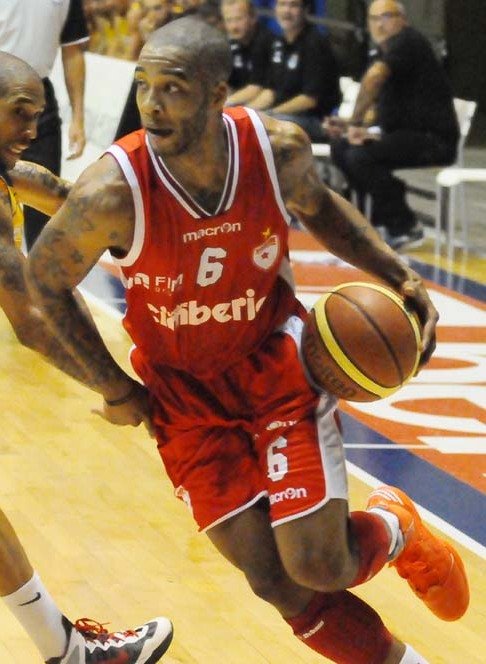
Adrian Banks

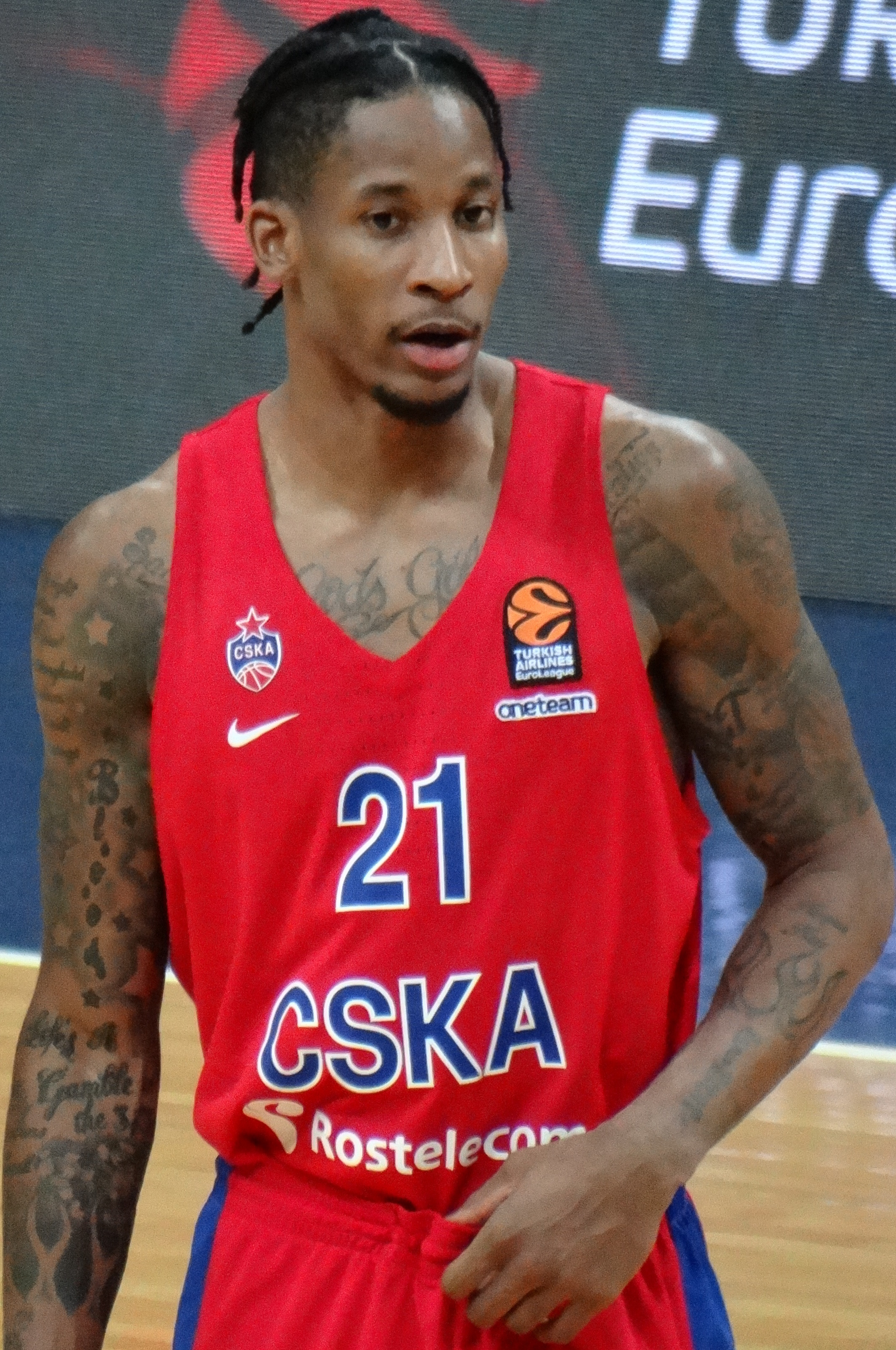
Will Clyburn

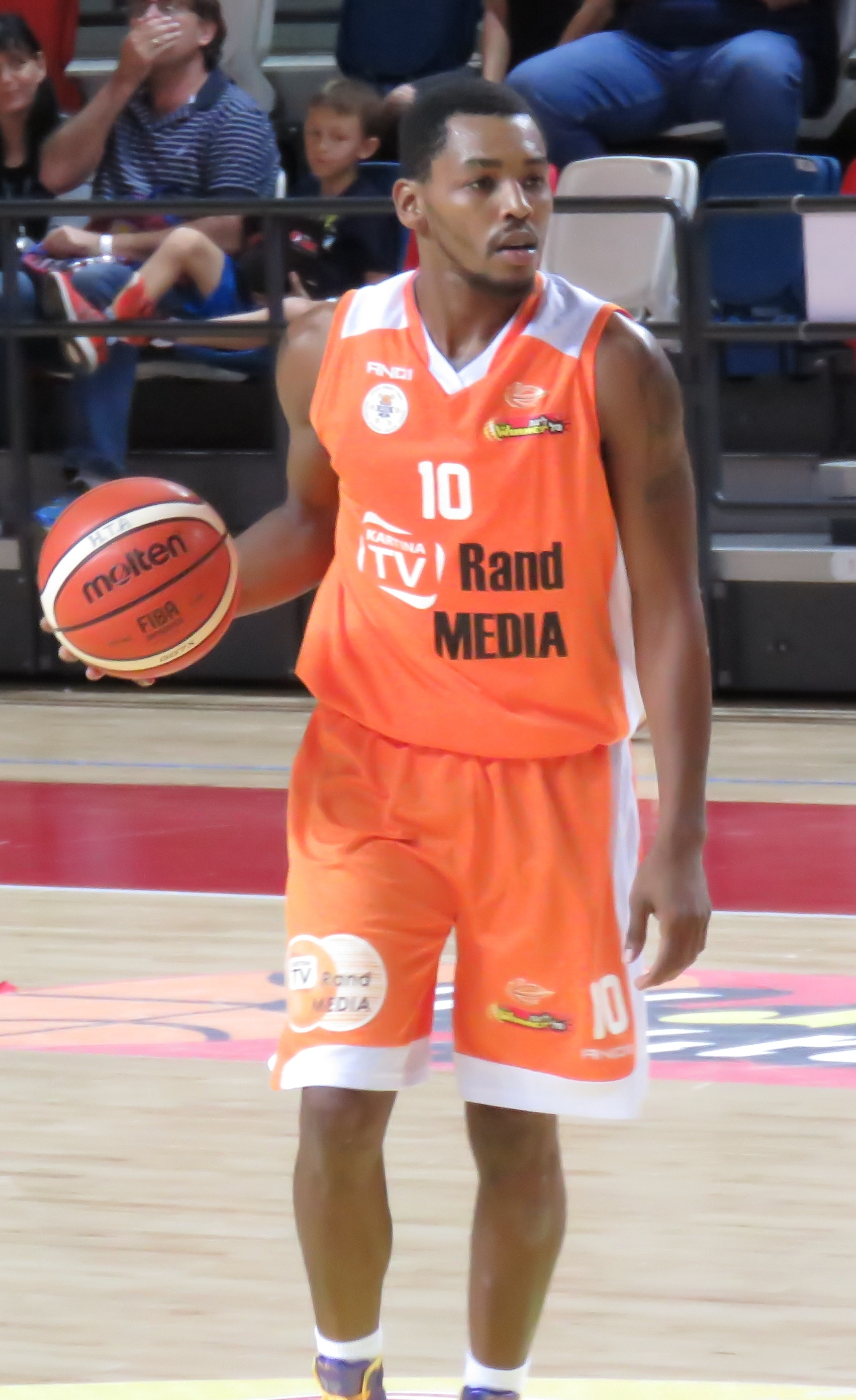
Mark Lyons

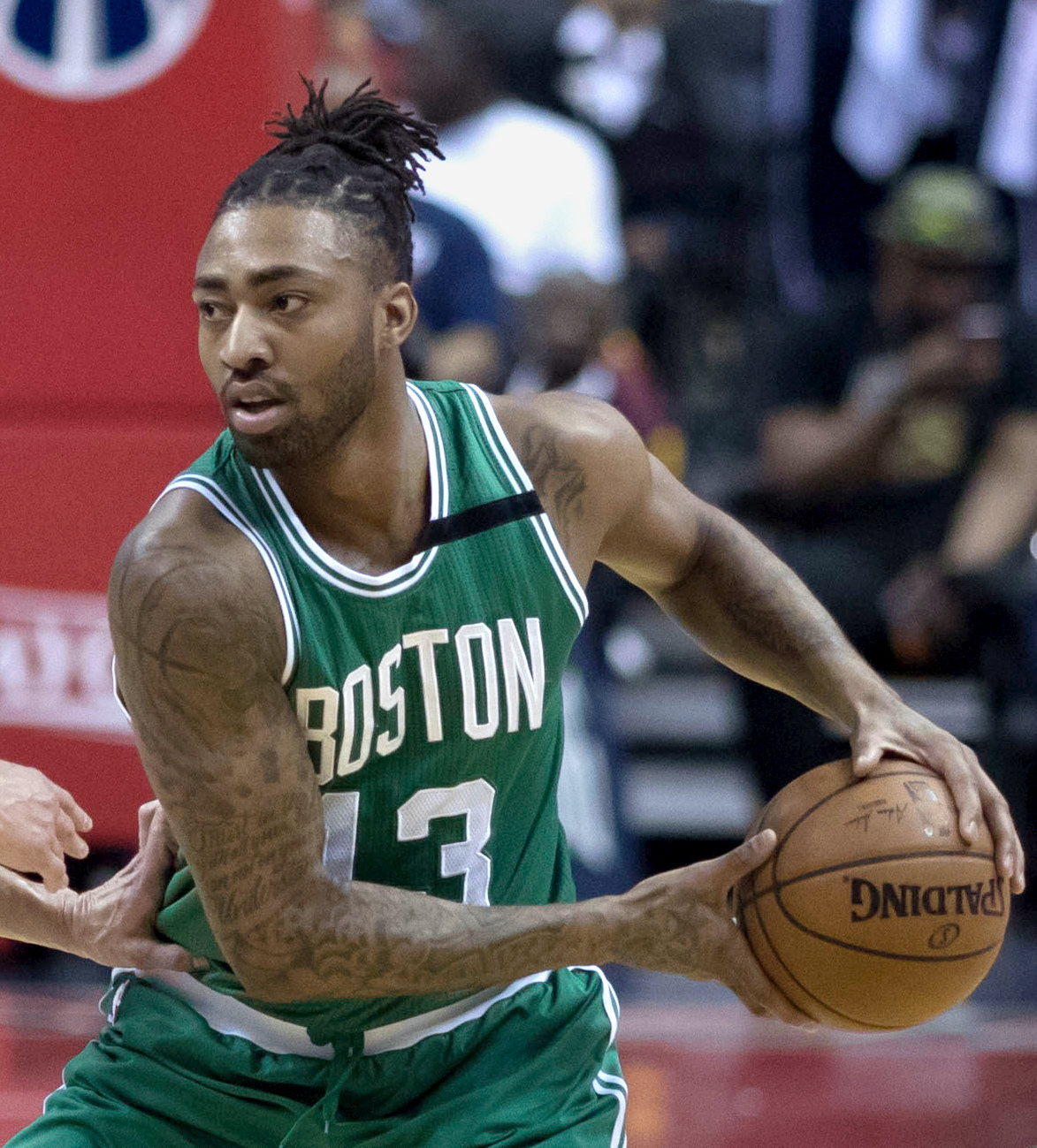
James Young

Since the 1989–90 season, the Top Scorer of the Israeli Premier League, is the player that based on the minimum qualifying number of games played, had the highest points per game scoring average during the season.

| Season | Player | Team | Average | Ref |
|---|---|---|---|---|
| 1989–90 | (United States) (France) Marcus Gaither | Maccabi Kiryat Motzkin | 28.6 | |
| 1990–91 | (United States) Michael Hackett | Beitar Tel Aviv | 26.7 | |
| 1991–92 | (United States) (Israel) Joe Dawson | Hapoel Eilat | 27.5 | |
| 1992–93 | (United States) Dennis Williams | Hapoel Holon | 26.3 | |
| 1993–94 | (United States) David Ancrum | Hapoel Afula | 32.2 | |
| 1994–95 | (United States) J. J. Eubanks | Maccabi Ramat Gan | 30.9 | |
| 1995–96 | (United States) Derrick Gervin | Hapoel Gvat Yagur | 27.5 | |
| 1996–97 | (United States) Dametri Hill | Hapoel Tel Aviv | 22.8 | |
| 1997–98 | (United States) Derrick Gervin (2×) | Maccabi Kiryat Motzkin | 27.1 | |
| 1998–99 | (Israel) Doron Jamchi (4×) | Maccabi Rishon LeZion | 20.9 | |
| 1999–00 | (United States) Jo Jo English | Maccabi Kiryat Motzkin | 23.8 | |
| 2000–01 | (United States) Adrian Pledger | Hapoel Zfat | 23.7 | |
| 2001–02 | (Canada) Rowan Barrett | Maccabi Rishon LeZion | 25.5 | |
| 2002–03 | (Canada) (Cameroon) Charles Minlend | Elitzur Givat Shmuel | 25.3 | |
| 2003–04 | (United States) Lucius Davis | Maccabi Rishon LeZion | 23.1 | |
| 2004–05 | (United States) Malik Dixon | Maccabi Rishon LeZion | 24.7 | |
| 2005–06 | (United States) Marcus Hatten | Hapoel Tel Aviv | 23.0 | |
| 2006–07 | (United States) Ricardo Marsh | Ironi Ashkelon | 20.9 | |
| 2007–08 | (United States) Steve Burtt Jr. | Ironi Ashkelon | 21.1 | |
| 2008–09 | (Dominican Republic) Luis Flores | Hapoel Holon | 19.8 | |
| 2009–10 | (United States) Justin Dentmon | Hapoel Afula | 19.8 | |
| 2010–11 | (United States) Lee Nailon | Bnei Hasharon | 18.2 | |
| 2011–12 | (United States) Adrian Banks | Barak Netanya | 21.5 | |
| 2012–13 | (United States) Jerome Dyson | Hapoel Holon | 20.4 | |
| 2013–14 | (United States) Carlon Brown | Hapoel Tel Aviv | 19.6 | |
| 2014–15 | (United States) Mark Lyons | Ironi Nahariya | 18.4 | |
| 2015–16 | (United States) Will Clyburn | Hapoel Holon | 20.9 | |
| 2016–17 | (United States) Mark Lyons (2×) | Hapoel Tel Aviv | 20.1 | |
| 2017–18 | (United States) Glen Rice Jr. | Hapoel Holon | 24.3 | |
| 2018–19 | (United States) Mark Tollefsen | Maccabi Ashdod | 20.4 | |
| 2019–20 | (United States) James Young | Maccabi Haifa | 20.5 | |
| 2020–21 | (Nigeria) (Canada) Caleb Agada | Hapoel Be'er Sheva | 22.9 | |
| 2021–22 | (United States) (United Kingdom) Sacha Killeya-Jones | Hapoel Gilboa Galil | 18.4 | |
| 2022–23 | (United States) Tyler Bey | Ironi Ness Ziona | 20.3 | |
| 2023–24 | (United States) Elijah Stewart | Hapoel Eilat | 20.6 | |
| 2024–25 | (United States) Bryce Brown | Ironi Ness Ziona | 19.5 | |
| 2025–26 | (United States) Elijah Stewart | Bnei Herzliya | 20.2 | |

=== Rebounding leaders ===
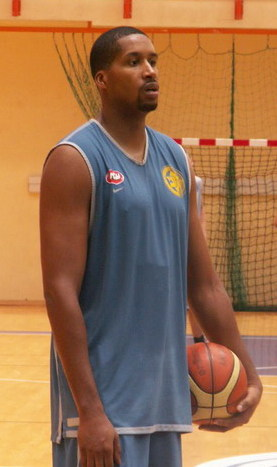
Jamie Arnold

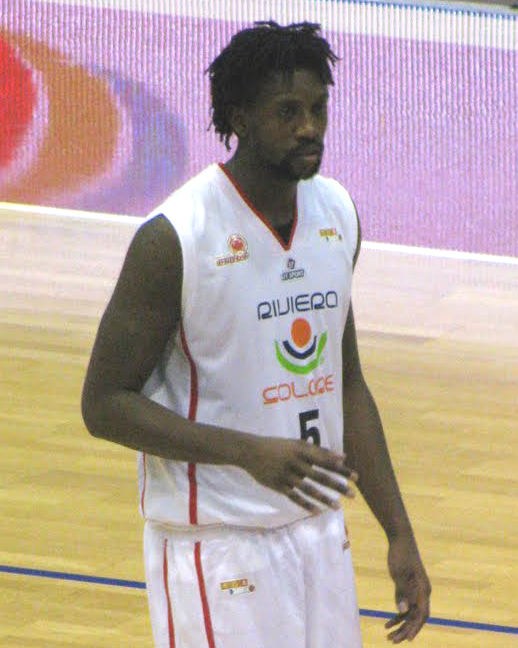
Ndudi Ebi

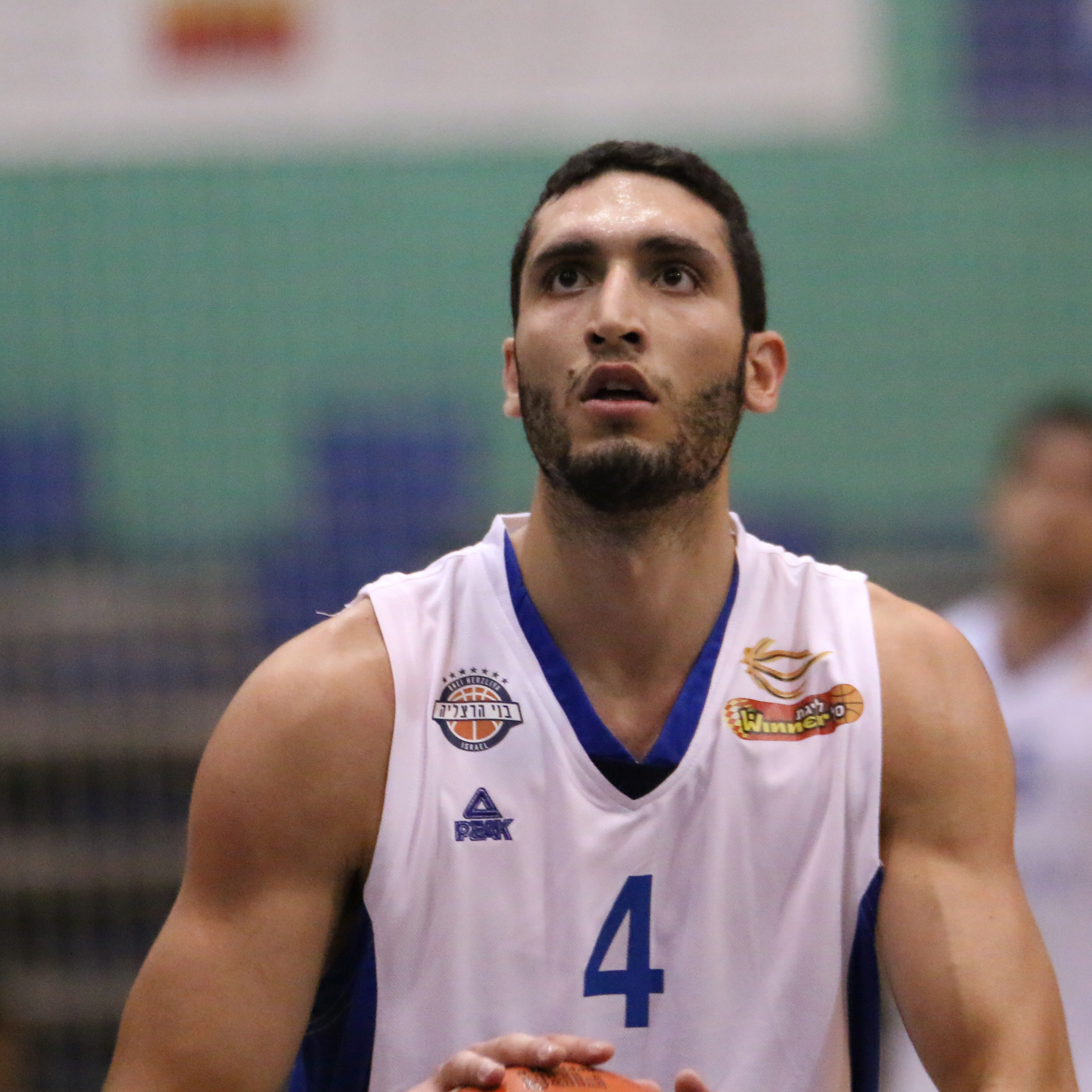
Karam Mashour

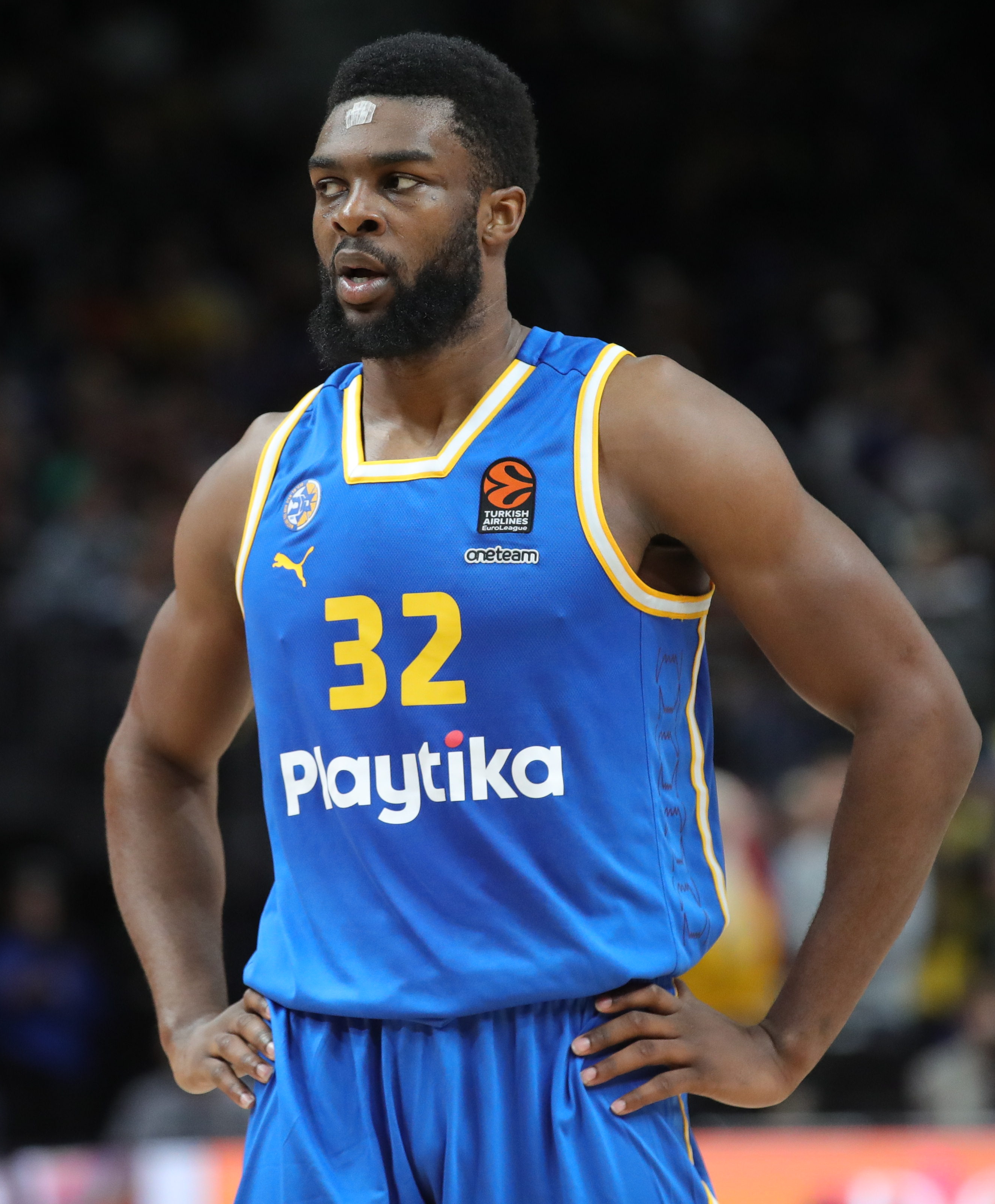
Josh Nebo

| Season | Player | Team | Average | Ref |
|---|---|---|---|---|
| 1989–90 | (United States) (Israel) Earl Williams | Maccabi Ramat Gan | 14.6 | |
| 1990–91 | (United States) (Israel) Earl Williams (2×) | Hapoel Holon | 13.4 | |
| 1991–92 | (United States) (Israel) Joe Dawson | Hapoel Eilat | 10.7 | |
| 1992–93 | (United States) Gary Alexander | Maccabi Haifa | 11.9 | |
| 1993–94 | (United States) Kevin Magee | Maccabi Rishon LeZion | 12.5 | |
| 1994–95 | (United States) James Gulley | Maccabi Rishon LeZion | 12.7 | |
| 1995–96 | (United States) James Gulley (2×) | Maccabi Rishon LeZion | 11.6 | |
| 1996–97 | (United States) James Gulley (3×) | Maccabi Rishon LeZion | 10.2 | |
| 1997–98 | (United States) Ed Elisma | Hapoel Eilat | 9.4 | |
| 1998–99 | (United States) (Israel) Jamie Arnold | Hapoel Galil Elyon | 9.6 | |
| 1999–00 | (United States) Stanley Brundy | Hapoel Haifa | 10.7 | |
| 2000–01 | (United States) Stanley Brundy (2×) | Maccabi Haifa | 11.4 | |
| 2001–02 | (United States) Stanley Brundy (3×) | Maccabi Haifa | 12.7 | |
| 2002–03 | (Israel) Ido Kozikaro | Hapoel Galil Elyon | 9.1 | |
| 2003–04 | (United States) Jayson Wells | Ramat Hasharon / Haifa | 11.5 | |
| 2004–05 | (United States) Stanley Brundy (4×) | Maccabi Petach Tikva | 10.6 | |
| 2005–06 | (Mali) Ousmane Cisse | Bnei Hasharon | 10.1 | |
| 2006–07 | (Nigeria) Kenny Adeleke | Hapoel Galil Elyon | 9.3 | |
| 2007–08 | (Nigeria) Ndudi Ebi | Bnei Hasharon | 8.5 | |
| 2008–09 | (United States) Rahshon Turner | Ironi Ashkelon | 10.6 | |
| 2009–10 | (United States) John Thomas | Hapoel Holon | 8.6 | |
| 2010–11 | (United States) (Guyana) Shawn James | Bnei Hasharon | 11.1 | |
| 2011–12 | (United States) (Armenia) Bryant Dunston | Hapoel Holon | 9.4 | |
| 2012–13 | (United States) Frank Hassell | Hapoel Holon | 14.2 | |
| 2013–14 | (United States) Marcus Dove | Maccabi Ashdod | 9.5 | |
| 2014–15 | (United States) Julian Wright | Bnei Herzliya | 9.8 | |
| 2015–16 | (Nigeria) (United States) Alade Aminu | Hapoel Eilat | 9.9 | |
| 2016–17 | (Israel) Karam Mashour | Bnei Herzliya | 10.3 | |
| 2017–18 | (United States) Demetrius Treadwell | Hapoel Eilat | 9.2 | |
| 2018–19 | (United States) Greg Whittington | Hapoel Gilboa Galil | 9.6 | |
| 2019–20 | (United States) Stephen Zack | Hapoel Be'er Sheva | 10.7 | |
| 2020–21 | (Slovenia) (United States) Josh Nebo | Hapoel Eilat | 10.0 | |
| 2021–22 | (United States) (Nigeria) Chinanu Onuaku | Bnei Herzliya | 9.4 | |
| 2022–23 | (United States) Zach Hankins | Hapoel Jerusalem | 10.1 | |
| 2023–24 | (Israel) Itay Segev | Ironi Ness Ziona | 8.6 | |
| 2024–25 | (United States) Justyn Mutts | Hapoel Afula | 8.9 | |
| 2025–26 | (United States) Joirdon Nicholas | Maccabi Ironi Ramat Gan | 9.4 | |

=== Assists leaders ===
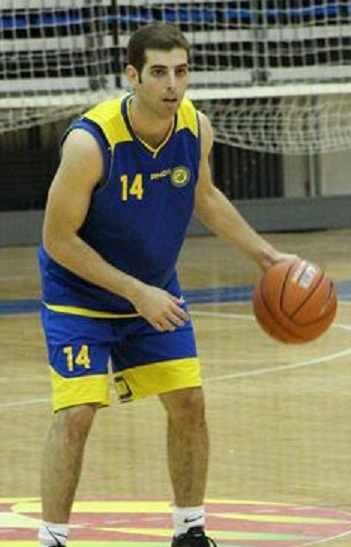
Guni Israeli

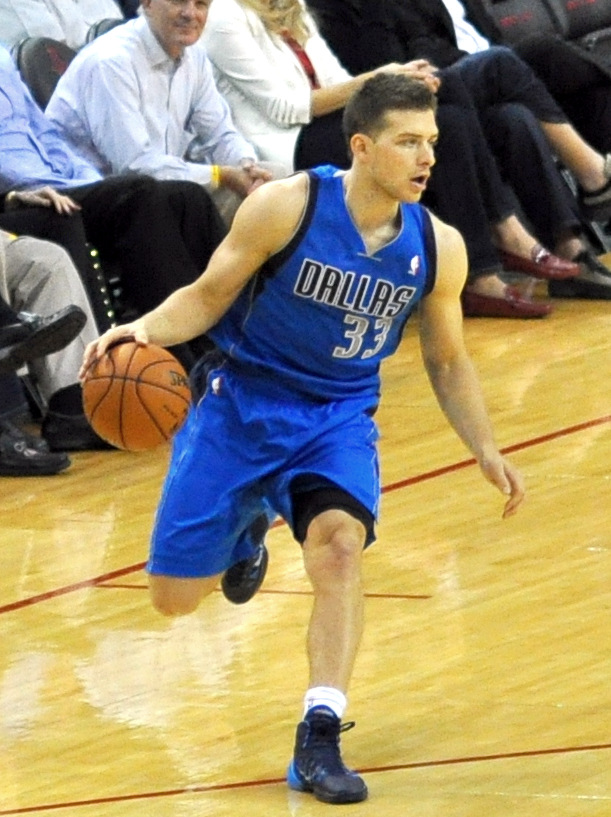
Gal Mekel

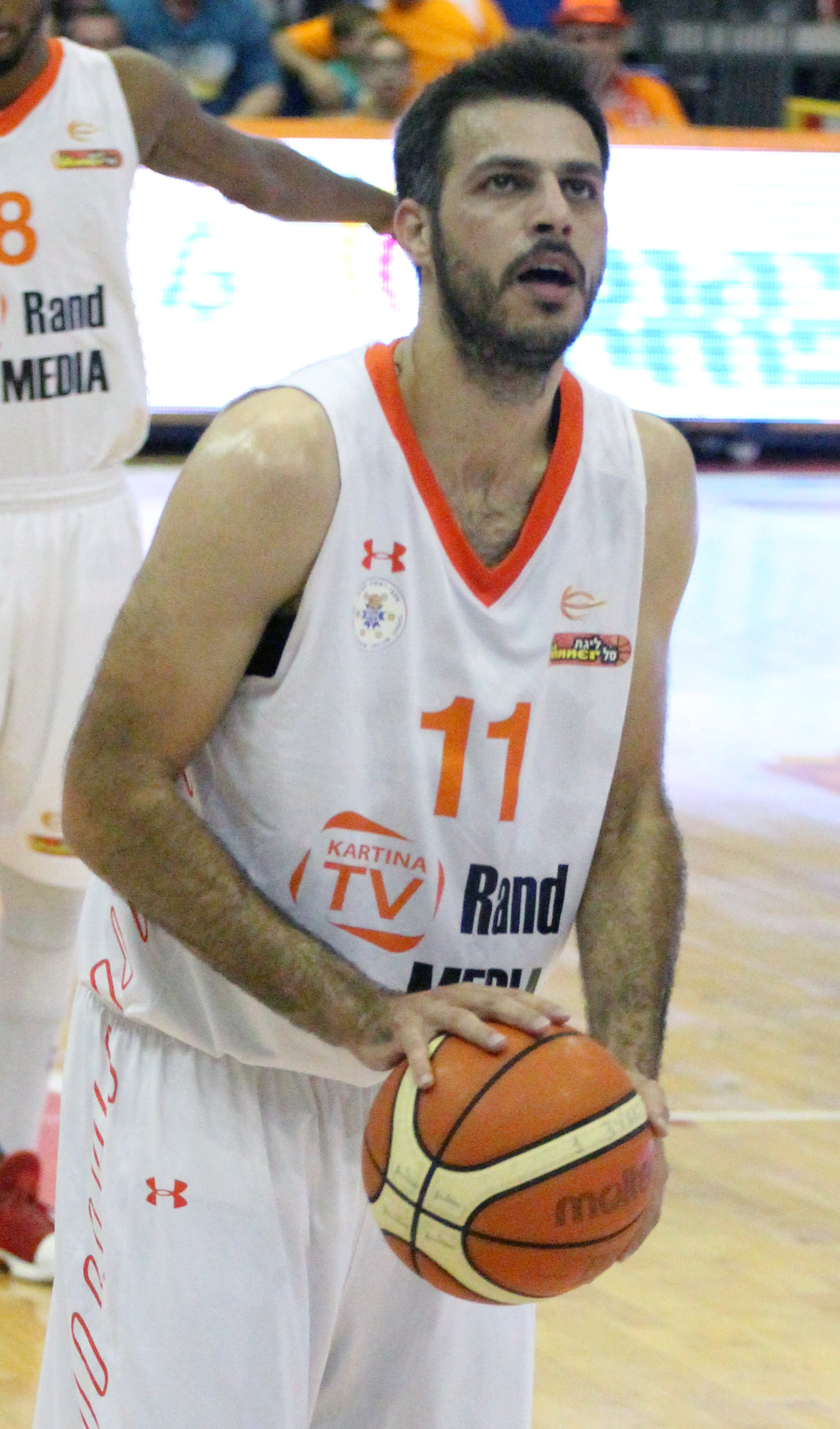
Avi Ben Chimol

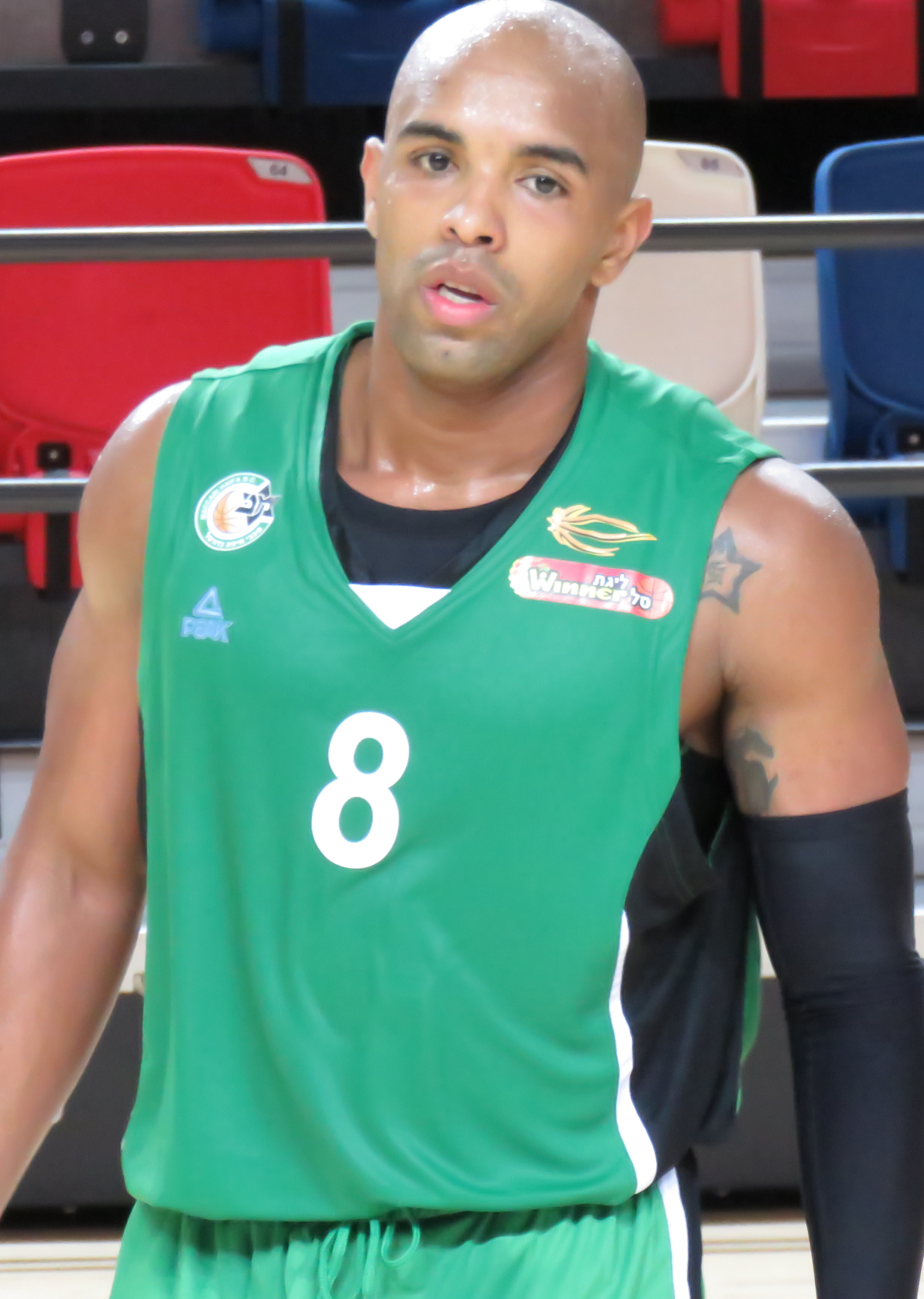
Gregory Vargas

| Season | Player | Team | Average | Ref |
|---|---|---|---|---|
| 1989–90 | (Bosnia and Herzegovina) Emir Mutapčić | Hapoel Jerusalem | 3.8 | |
| 1990–91 | (Israel) Amos Frishman | Hapoel Tel Aviv | 5.4 | |
| 1991–92 | (Israel) Adi Gordon | Hapoel Jerusalem | 6.1 | |
| 1992–93 | (Israel) Adi Gordon (2×) | Hapoel Jerusalem | 6.5 | |
| 1993–94 | (Israel) Adi Gordon (3×) | Hapoel Jerusalem | 5.4 | |
| 1994–95 | (Israel) Papi Turgeman | Hapoel Jerusalem | 6.5 | |
| 1995–96 | (Israel) Adi Gordon (4×) | Hapoel Jerusalem | 5.4 | |
| 1996–97 | (Israel) Rotem Erlich | Maccabi Ra'anana | 5.2 | |
| 1997–98 | (Israel) Meir Tapiro | Hapoel Eilat | 5.6 | |
| 1998–99 | (United States) Corey Gaines | Hapoel Eilat | 6.1 | |
| 1999–00 | (Israel) Lior Lubin | Maccabi Ramat Gan | 5.5 | |
| 2000–01 | (United States) Corey Gaines (2×) | Maccabi Haifa | 5.4 | |
| 2001–02 | (United States) Corey Gaines (3×) | Maccabi Haifa | 6.3 | |
| 2002–03 | (United States) Corey Gaines (4×) | Maccabi Haifa | 7.2 | |
| 2003–04 | (Israel) Meir Tapiro (2×) | Bnei Hasharon | 7.3 | |
| 2004–05 | (United States) Andre Woolridge | Ironi Nahariya | 5.2 | |
| 2005–06 | (Israel) Meir Tapiro (3×) | Hapoel Jerusalem | 5.4 | |
| 2006–07 | (Israel) Guni Israeli | Hapoel Gilboa/Afula | 6.5 | |
| 2007–08 | (United States) Lamont Jones | Hapoel Gilboa/Afula | 5.7 | |
| 2008–09 | (Puerto Rico) Carlos Arroyo | Maccabi Tel Aviv | 6.2 | |
| 2009–10 | (Israel) Meir Tapiro (4×) | Maccabi Rishon LeZion | 6.5 | |
| 2010–11 | (Israel) Gal Mekel | Hapoel Gilboa Galil | 6.2 | |
| 2010–11 | (Israel) Shmulik Brener | Barak Netanya | 6.2 | |
| 2011–12 | (Israel) Moran Roth | Hapoel Holon | 8.0 | |
| 2012–13 | (United States) Dominic Waters | Hapoel Holon | 7.3 | |
| 2013–14 | (Israel) Meir Tapiro (5×) | Ironi Nes Ziona | 6.6 | |
| 2014–15 | (United States) Jeremy Pargo | Maccabi Tel Aviv | 6.8 | |
| 2015–16 | (Israel) Gal Mekel (2×) | Maccabi Tel Aviv | 7.4 | |
| 2016–17 | (Venezuela) Gregory Vargas | Maccabi Haifa | 6.8 | |
| 2017–18 | (Israel) Avi Ben-Chimol | Maccabi Rishon LeZion | 7.2 | |
| 2018–19 | (Israel) Avi Ben-Chimol (2×) | Hapoel Eilat | 7.8 | |
| 2019–20 | (Venezuela) Gregory Vargas (2×) | Maccabi Haifa | 9.7 | |
| 2020–21 | (Israel) Tamir Blatt | Hapoel Jerusalem | 7.9 | |
| 2021–22 | (Venezuela) Gregory Vargas (3×) | Hapoel Haifa | 6.2 | |
| 2022–23 | (United States) D. J. Cooper | Ironi Ness Ziona | 13.9 | |
| 2023–24 | (United States) Speedy Smith | Hapoel Jerusalem | 7.6 | |
| 2024–25 | (Israel) Niv Misgav | Hapoel Gilboa Galil | 7.4 | |
| 2025–26 | (United States) Joe Ragland | Maccabi Ra'anana | 7.7 | |

== All-time leaders ==
=== Points ===
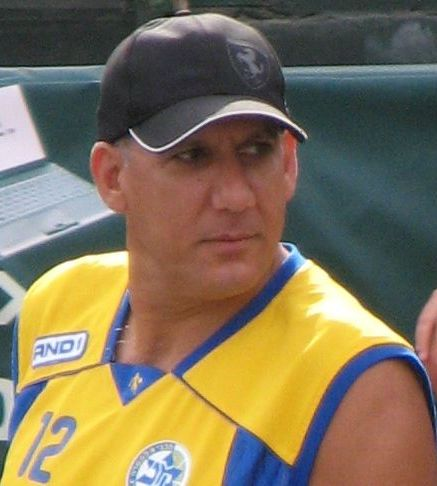
Doron Jamchi

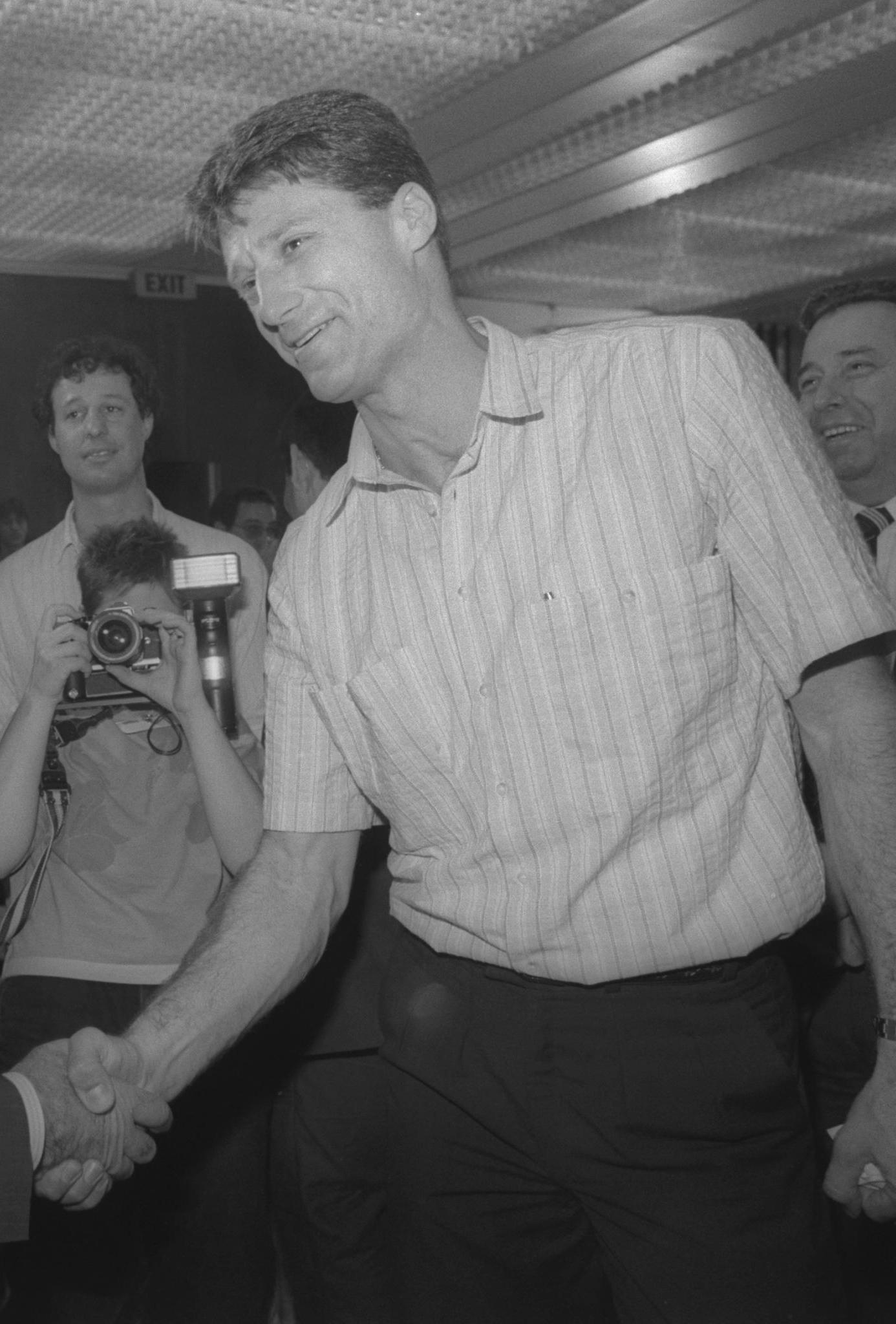
Miki Berkovich

| Rank | Player | Points scored |
|---|---|---|
| 1 | (Israel) Doron Jamchi | 9,592 |
| 2 | (Israel) Miki Berkovich | 8,231 |
| 3 | (Israel) Ofer Eshed | 7,758 |
| 4 | (Israel) Boaz Janay | 6,752 |
| 5 | (Israel) Or Goren | 6,403 |
| 6 | (Israel) (United States) Brad Leaf | 6,083 |
| 7 | (Israel) Chaim Buchbinder | 6,044 |
| 8 | (Israel) Tanhum Cohen-Mintz | 5,875 |
| 9 | (Israel) Doron Shefa | 5,714 |
| 10 | (Israel) (United States) Steve Kaplan | 5,676 |

Source: basket.co.il

=== Players with most top-scorer awards ===
| Player | Awards | Editions |
|---|---|---|
| (Israel) Ofer Eshed | 6 | 1961-1963, 1965, 1967, 1960 |
| (United States) (Israel) Steve Kaplan | 2 | 1974-1978 |
| (Israel) Doron Jamchi | 4 | 1982, 1984, 1985, 1999 |
| (Israel) Chaim Buchbinder | 3 | 1966, 1968, 1969 |
| (United States) Derrick Gervin | 2 | 1996, 1998 |
| (United States) Mark Lyons | 2 | 2015, 2017 |
| (United States) Kevin Magee | 2 | 1986, 1989 |
| (Israel) Gabi Teichner | 2 | 1971, 1972 |
