= 2026 Israeli Basketball State Cup =

Israeli Basketball State Cup season

Tournament details
- Country: Israel
- Dates: 31 January – February 2026
- Teams: 8
- Defending champions: Maccabi Tel Aviv

Final positions
- Champions: Maccabi Tel Aviv
- Runners-up: Bnei Herzliya
- Semifinalists: Hapoel HaEmek; Hapoel Jerusalem

Tournament statistics
- Matches played: 7

Awards
- MVP: (Israel) Roman Sorkin
- All statistics correct as of January 14, 2026.

The 2026 Israeli Basketball State Cup is the 66th edition of the Israeli Basketball State Cup, organized by the Israeli Basketball Association.

== Qualified teams ==
The top eight ranking teams after the first rotation (13 rounds) of the 2025–26 Israeli Basketball Premier League regular season qualified to the tournament.

Pos	Team	Pld	W	L	PF	PA	PD	Pts	Qualification or relegation
1	Hapoel Tel Aviv	13	12	1	1193	974	+219	25	Seeded at Quarterfinals
2	Maccabi Tel Aviv	13	12	1	1251	1035	+216	25	Seeded at Quarterfinals
3	Bnei Herzliya	13	9	4	1246	1167	+79	22	Seeded at Quarterfinals
4	Hapoel HaEmek	13	9	4	1036	993	+43	22	Seeded at Quarterfinals
5	Hapoel Jerusalem	13	8	5	1107	1045	+62	21	Unseeded at Quarterfinals
6	Hapoel Holon	13	8	5	1046	1097	−51	21	Unseeded at Quarterfinals
7	Ironi Kiryat Ata	13	6	7	1163	1182	−19	19	Unseeded at Quarterfinals
8	Hapoel Be'er Sheva/Dimona	13	6	7	1098	1132	−34	19	Unseeded at Quarterfinals
9	Maccabi Ironi Ramat Gan	13	5	8	1078	1104	−26	18	
10	Maccabi Rishon LeZion	13	5	8	1042	1092	−50	18	
11	Ironi Ness Ziona	13	4	9	1022	1104	−82	17	
12	Maccabi Ironi Ra'anana	13	3	10	1060	1120	−60	16	
13	Elitzur Netanya	13	2	11	1013	1140	−127	15	
14	Hapoel Galil Elyon	13	2	11	916	1086	−170	15	

Rules for classification:

== Bracket ==
On 14 January 2026, the Israel Basketball Association held the draw for the Quarterfinals. The draw for the Semifinals was held on 3 February 2026.

Quarterfinals
1 February, 21:00
7 Ironi Kiryat Ata	86
2 Maccabi Tel Aviv	108
31 January, 21:20
1 Hapoel Tel Aviv	83
5 Hapoel Jerusalem	93
1 February, 18:30
4 Hapoel HaEmek	96
6 Hapoel Holon	78
2 February, 20:10
8 Hapoel Be'er Sheva/Dimona	105
3 Bnei Herzliya	110

Semifinals
15 February, 20:45
2 Maccabi Tel Aviv	94
5 Hapoel Jerusalem	85
16 February, 19:00
4 Hapoel HaEmek	90
3 Bnei Herzliya	92

Final
19 February, 21:00
2 Maccabi Tel Aviv	109
3 Bnei Herzliya	90

== Quarterfinals ==
1 February	Ironi Kiryat Ata	86–108	Maccabi Tel Aviv	Kiryat Ata
21:00	Scoring by quarter: 22–25, 29–27, 23–25, 12–31
	Pts: Hall 21; Rebs: Hall 11; Asts: Asayag 6 PIR: Hall 23	Boxscore	Pts: Hoard 21; Rebs: Santos, Brissett 8 Asts: Blatt 11; PIR: Hoard 27	Arena: Ramaz Hall; Referees: Nir Meirson, Guy Shmueli, Tzur Tuval

2 February	Hapoel Be'er Sheva/Dimona	105–110	Bnei Herzliya	Be'er Sheva
20:10	Scoring by quarter: 37–32, 18–32, 24–25, 26–21
	Pts: Elleby 31; Rebs: Elleby 10; Asts: Elleby 7 PIR: Elleby 47	Boxscore	Pts: Heidegger 31; Rebs: Francis 7 Asts: Five Players 4 PIR: Heidegger 28	Arena: Conch Arena; Referees: Ofer Manheim, Ori Shalhavi, Omer Wasserman

1 February	Hapoel HaEmek	96–78	Hapoel Holon	Gan Ner
18:30	Scoring by quarter: 23–16, 16–18, 32–22, 25–22
	Pts: Misgav 22; Rebs: Childs 6 Asts: three players 4 PIR: Misgav 25	Boxscore	Pts: Sanogo 18; Rebs: Sanogo 8 Asts: Munford 8 PIR: Munford 19	Arena: Gan Ner Sports Hall; Referees: Sefi Shemesh, Kfir Mualem, Nir Keren

31 January	Hapoel Tel Aviv	83–93	Hapoel Jerusalem	Tel Aviv
21:20	Scoring by quarter: 22–21, 20–23, 18–22, 23–27
	Pts: Blakeney 22; Rebs: Oturu 8 Asts: Blakeney 5 PIR: Blakeney 23	Boxscore	Pts: Harper 24; Rebs: Wiley 12; Asts: Winston 7 PIR: Harper 27	Arena: Menora Mivtachim Arena; Referees: Amit Balak, Dan Yalon, Elad Leibovich

== Semifinals ==
15 February	Maccabi Tel Aviv	94–85	Hapoel Jerusalem	Tel Aviv
20:45	Scoring by quarter: 19–24, 26–23, 21–21, 28–17
	Pts: Sorkin 20; Rebs: Hoard, Brissett 7 Asts: Clark 5 PIR: Dowtin 26	Boxscore	Pts: Carrington 22; Rebs: Wiley 13; Asts: Harper 8 PIR: Wiley 29	Arena: Menora Mivtachim Arena; Referees: Sefi Shemesh, Amit Balak, Nir Meirson

16 February	Hapoel HaEmek	90–92	Bnei Herzliya	Tel Aviv
19:00	Scoring by quarter: 25–18, 17–19, 26–22, 22–33
	Pts: Edwards 28; Rebs: Menco 7 Asts: Misgav 7 PIR: Misgav 28	Boxscore	Pts: Onuaku, Heidegger 27; Rebs: Onuaku 10; Asts: Stewart 5 PIR: Onuaku 35	Arena: Menora Mivtachim Arena; Referees: Omer Esteron, Ofer Manheim, Kfir Mualem

== Final ==
19 February	Maccabi Tel Aviv	109–90	Bnei Herzliya	Tel Aviv
21:00	Scoring by quarter: 30–23, 29–16, 24–24, 26–27
	Pts: Sorkin 25; Rebs: Hoard 5 Asts: Three Players 8 PIR: Hoard 27	Boxscore	Pts: Onuaku 16; Rebs: Onuaku 8 Asts: Stewart 7 PIR: Onuaku 22	Arena: Menora Mivtachim Arena; Referees: Dan Yalon, Elad Leibovich, Omer Wasserman

Starters:			Pts	Reb	Ast
F/C	9	(Israel) Roman Sorkin	25	4	2
PF	1	(United States) Jaylen Hoard	20	5	2
G	2	(United States) Jimmy Clark III	11	4	8
PG	21	(United States) Jeff Dowtin Jr.	7	1	8
F	11	(Israel) Will Rayman	3	1	0
Reserves:					
PG	45	(Israel) Tamir Blatt	14	2	8
C	3	(Brazil) Márcio Santos	11	3	0
F	10	(Canada) Oshae Brissett	8	4	0
SF	4	(Israel) Gur Lavy	4	2	0
G	12	(Israel) John DiBartolomeo	3	4	2
G	7	(Israel) Oren Sahar	3	0	0
F/C	13	(Israel) Tamir Gold	0	0	0
Head coach:
(Israeli Basketball Association) Oded Kattash

M. Tel Aviv	B. Herzliya

M. Tel Aviv	Statistics	B. Herzliya
19/31 (61.3%)	2 point field goals	23/41 (56.1%)
17/31 (54.8%)	3 point field goals	13/32 (40.6%)
20/26 (76.9%)	Free throws	5/6 (83.3%)
33	Rebounds	30
30	Assists	27
9	Steals	8
12	Turnovers	13
2	Blocks	3

Starters:			Pts	Reb	Ast
SF	44	(United States) Elijah Stewart	10	1	7
F/C	32	(United States) Chinanu Onuaku	16	8	6
F	35	(United States) Noah Carter	15	2	0
F	2	(United States) Denver Jones	9	3	5
G	8	(Israel) Frédéric Bourdillon	6	1	2
Reserves:					
SG	15	(Israel) Shalev Lugashi	13	6	2
F/C	30	(United States) D.J. Burns	12	4	2
PG	21	(Israel) Max Heidegger	9	3	3
G	11	(Israel) Omer Sadeh	DNP		
G	13	(Israel) Kai Obziler	DNP		
PG	26	(Israel) Jordan Lazar	DNP		
SG	34	(Israel) Nitay Shalem	DNP		
Head coach:
(Israeli Basketball Association) Yehu Orland

2026 Israeli State Cup Winners
Maccabi Tel Aviv
(47th title)
