= Maccabi Hadera =

Maccabi Hadera may refer to several Israeli sports teams:

- Maccabi Hadera (basketball), a basketball team
- Maccabi Hadera (volleyball), a volleyball team
- Maccabi Hadera F.C., a former association football team (men)
- Maccabi Kishronot Hadera F.C., an association football team (women)
