= Adi Gordon =

Israeli basketball player

Adi Gordon עדי גורדון
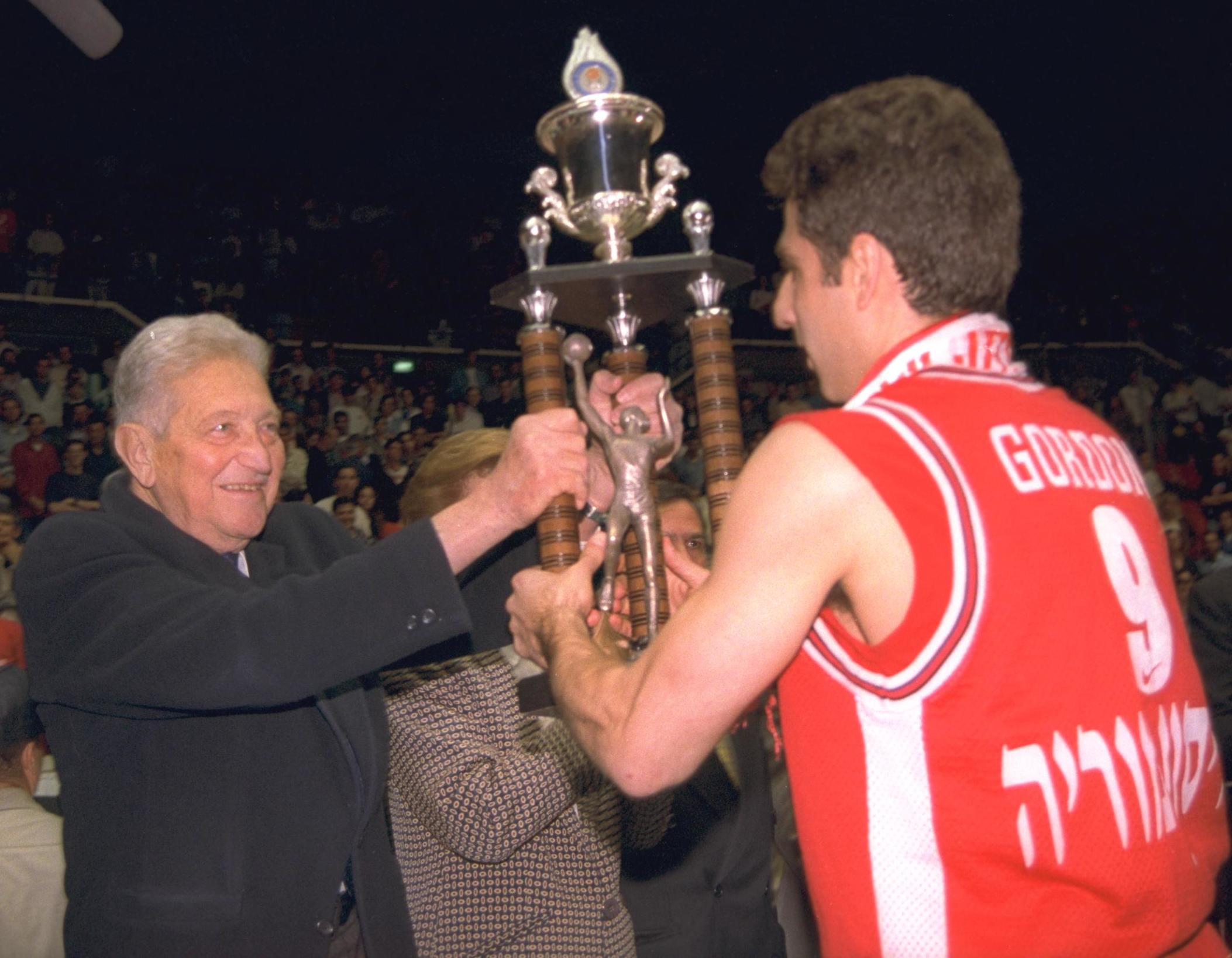
- Gordon receives the Israeli State Cup from Pres. Weizman, April 1996

Personal information
- Born: March 4, 1966 (age 60) Binyamina, Israel
- Listed height: 1.80 m (5 ft 11 in)

Career information
- Playing career: 1980–1998
- Position: Point guard
- Number: 9, 10

Career history
- 1980–1984: Maccabi Hadera
- 1984–1989: Maccabi Haifa
- 1989–1990: Hapoel Haifa
- 1990–1991: Hapoel Galil Elyon
- 1991–1994: Hapoel Jerusalem
- 1994–1995: Hapoel Holon
- 1995–1998: Hapoel Jerusalem

Career highlights
- 2× Israeli State Cup winner (1996, 1997); 2× All-Israeli League First team (1990, 1997); 4× Israeli League Assists Leader (1992–1994, 1996)

Adi Gordon (Hebrew: עדי גורדון; born March 4, 1966) is an Israeli former professional basketball player. He was a two-time Israeli State Cup winner with Hapoel Jerusalem. He was a four-time Israeli Premier League Assists Leader, in 1992 to 1994, and 1996. Gordon is widely considered one of the greatest point guards in Israeli basketball history.

== Early life ==
Gordon was born in Binyamina, Israel. He played tennis, table tennis and football as a child, but ultimately chose basketball and played for Maccabi Hadera youth team as a teen.

== Professional career ==
=== Early years (1980–1991) ===
Gordon started his professional career with Maccabi Hadera.

In 1984, Gordon joined Maccabi Haifa of the Israeli Premier League under head coach Pini Gershon. In his first game with Maccabi Haifa, Gordon recorded 13 points, including a game-winner shot in a 94–92 win over Maccabi Tel Aviv. On January 12, 1987, Gordon recorded a career-high 37 points in a 108–102 win over Hapoel Gvat.

In 1989, Gordon signed with Hapoel Haifa and one year later joined Hapoel Galil Elyon.

=== Hapoel Jerusalem (1991–1994) ===
Gordon was a four-time Israeli Premier League Assists Leader, in 1992 to 1994, and 1996.

In 1991, Gordon signed with Hapoel Jerusalem. On March 21, 1993, Gordon tied his career-high 37 points, shooting 6-of-10 from 3-point range, along with seven assists in a 95–82 win over Hapoel Eilat.

On April 28, 1994, Gordon recorded 15 points, including a game-winner shot to give Jerusalem an 82–81 playoff win over Hapoel Tel Aviv.

=== Hapoel Holon (1994–1995) ===
In 1994, Gordon parted ways with Jerusalem due to financial struggles and joined Hapoel Holon for one season.

=== Return to Jerusalem (1995–1998) ===
In 1995, Gordon returned to Hapoel Jerusalem for a second stint, joining his former head coach Pini Gershon. On April 19, 1996, Gordon scored a game-winner shot to give Jerusalem a 67–65 win over Maccabi Tel Aviv, leading Jerusalem to win the 1996 Israeli State Cup – their first ever title.

In 1997, Gordon helped Jerusalem to reach the 1997 FIBA Sporta Cup Quarterfinals, where they eventually lost to Iraklis Thessaloniki. In April 1997, Gordon recorded 32 points in an 89–82 win over Maccabi Tel Aviv, leading Jerusalem to win the 1997 Israeli State Cup title for two years in a row.

In June 1998, Gordon announced his retirement from playing professional basketball.

== National team career ==
Gordon was a member of the Israel national basketball team. He participated in the 1986 FIBA World Championship and the 1987, 1993 and 1995 EuroBasket tournaments.

On June 23, 1993, during the Eurobasket tournament, Gordon recorded a national team career-high 35 points, scoring eight shots from 3-point range, in a 79–74 win over Greece.
