= Rotem =

Rotem may refer to:

- Rotem (name)

== Other uses ==
- Rotem, the Hebrew name (רותם) for the genus of flowering bushes Retama
- Rotem (medicine), rotational thromboelastometry; test of blood coagulation
- Rotem, Bik'at HaYarden, Israeli settlement in the West Bank
- Rotem, Belgium, a sub-municipality of Dilsen-Stokkem
- Rotem Crisis, a 1960 confrontation between Israel and the United Arab Republic
- Hyundai Rotem, a South Korean machinery manufacturer which is part of Hyundai Motor Group
- IAI Rotem L, an Israeli unmanned aerial vehicle
