= 1954–1955 Israeli Basketball League =

1954–55 Israeli Basketball Super League season
- League: Israeli Basketball League
- Sport: Basketball
- Duration: 1955
- Number of games: 132
- Number of teams: 12

Regular Season
- League champions: Maccabi Tel Aviv
- Runners-up: Hapoel Holon

Israeli Basketball Super League seasons
- ← 1953–54 1956-57 →

The 1954–55 Israeli Basketball League season was the 2nd season of top division basketball in Israel. The league was played over regular season only, with the top placed team winning the championship.

== Standings ==
Pos	Team	Pts	P	W	L	PF	PA	PD
1.	Maccabi Tel Aviv	44	22	22	0	1987	1021	+966
2.	Hapoel Holon	40	22	18	4	1463	1174	+289
3.	Maccabi Darom Tel Aviv	38	22	16	6	1364	1152	+212
4.	Hapoel Tel Aviv	37	22	16	6	1346	1037	+309
5.	Hapoel Ashdot Ya'akov	36	22	14	8	1253	1063	+190
6.	Hapoel Mishmar HaEmek	32	22	10	12	1187	1320	-133
7.	Maccabi Jerusalem	30	22	10	12	1198	1309	-111
8.	Hapoel Haifa	30	22	8	14	1202	1214	-12
9.	Maccabi Haifa	30	22	8	14	1206	1282	-76
10.	Brit Maccabim Atid	28	22	6	16	1145	1267	-122
11.	Maccabi Tzafon Tel Aviv	24	22	3	19	924	1425	-501
12.	Hapoel Jerusalem	23	22	1	22	1167	1599	-432

Source: Hadshot HaSport, 11 December 1955, p. 2
Pts=Points, P=Matches played, W=Matches won, L=Matches lost, F=Points for, A=Points against, D=Points difference.
