= Chaim Buchbinder =

Israeli basketball player

Chaim Buchbinder חיים בוכבינדר
Personal information
- Born: October 11, 1943 (age 83)
- Listed height: 6 ft 3.75 in (1.92 m)

Career information
- Playing career: 1962–1972
- Position: Shooting guard

Career history
- 1962–1972: Maccabi Haifa

Career highlights
- As player: 3× Israeli Premier League Top Scorer (1966, 1968, 1969)

Chaim Buchbinder (alternate spellings: Haim, Baram, Bar-am, Hebrew: חיים בוכבינדר; born October 11, 1943) is an Israeli former basketball player and coach. During his club career, he scored a total of 6,044 career points, which is the 7th-most points scored in the history Israeli Premier League. Buchbinder also represented the Israeli national team.

== Club career ==
Buchbinder played 11 seasons Israeli Premier League with Maccabi Haifa, from 1962 to 1972. Buchbinder was a three-time Israeli Premier League Top Scorer, in the years 1966, 1968, and 1969.

He scored 6,044 points in the Israeli Premier League, which is places him in 7th place all-time, in Israel Premier League history. His career scoring average in the Israeli Premier League was 23.5 points per game.

== National team career ==
Buchbinder represented the senior men's Israeli national team. With Israel, he played at the 1969 FIBA EuroBasket. He had a total of 46 caps with Israel's national team.

== Coaching career ==
After he retired from playing club basketball, Buchbinder became a basketball coach. In 1981, he became the head coach of the Israeli club Hapoel Haifa. In 1984, he became the head coach of the Israeli club Hapoel Galil Elyon. In the middle of the 1987–88 season, he became the head coach of the Israeli club Maccabi Haifa. In 1990, he became the head coach of the Israeli club Maccabi Kiryat Motzkin.

== See also ==
- Israeli Premier League Statistical Leaders
