= Sean Green (basketball) =

American basketball player (born 1970)

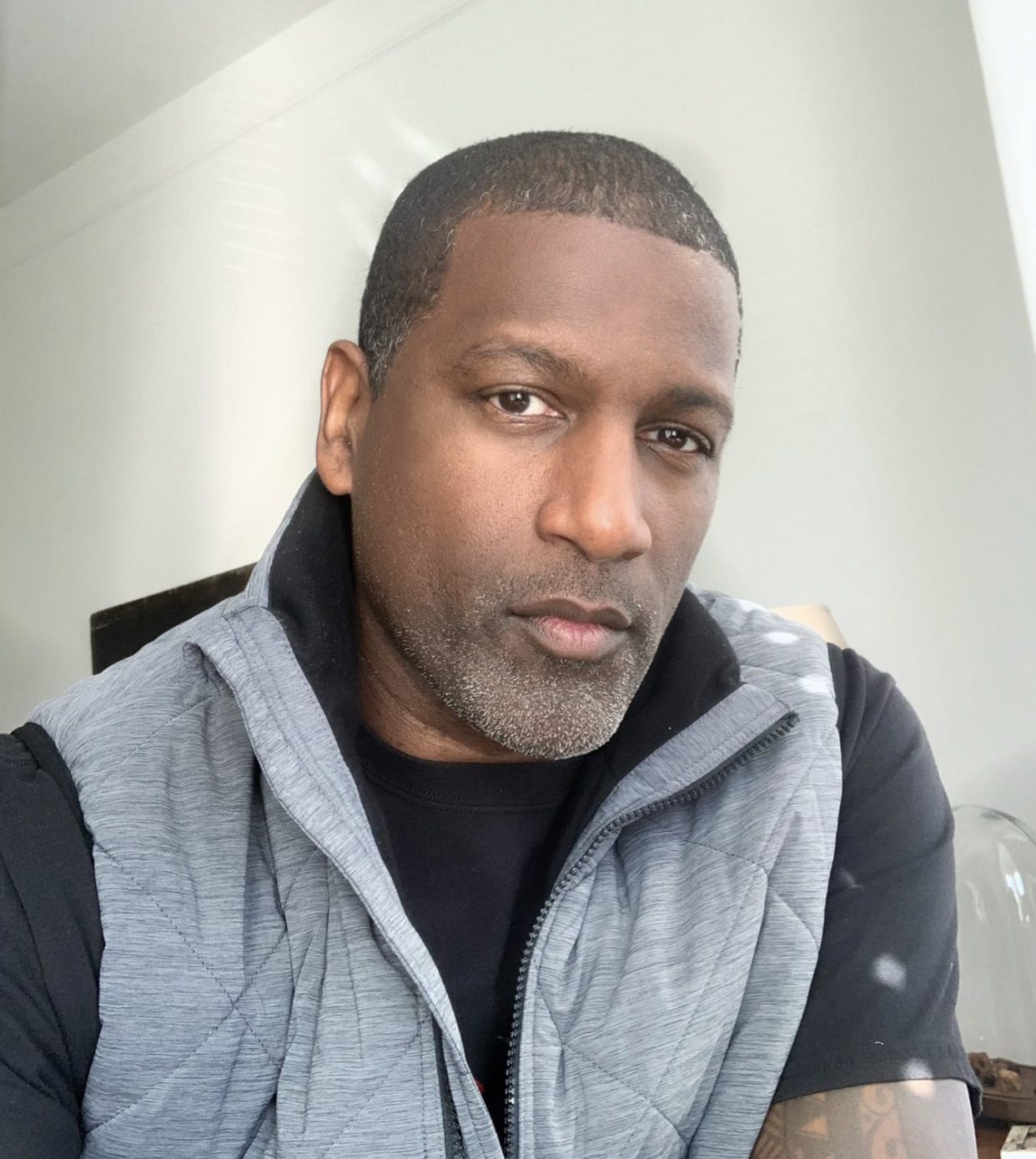
- Green in 2020

Personal information
- Born: February 2, 1970 (age 56) Santa Monica, California, U.S.
- Listed height: 6 ft 5 in (1.96 m)
- Listed weight: 210 lb (95 kg)

Career information
- High school: Oak Hill Academy (Mouth of Wilson, Virginia)
- College: NC State (1987–1988); Iona (1988–1991)
- NBA draft: 1991: 2nd round, 41st overall pick
- Drafted by: Indiana Pacers
- Playing career: 1991–2002
- Position: Small forward / shooting guard
- Number: 23, 7, 30

Career history
- 1991–1993: Indiana Pacers
- 1993–1994: Philadelphia 76ers
- 1994: Utah Jazz
- 1994: Marinos de Anzoategui
- 1995: Macaabi Jerusalem
- 1995–1996: Teorematour Milano
- 1996: Portland Mountain Cats
- 1996: Jcoplastic Napoli
- 1997: Sta. Lucia Realtors
- 1998–2000: Darüşşafaka
- 2000–2001: JDA Dijon Basket
- 2002: Bravos de Guanare

Career highlights
- First-team All-MAAC (1991)
- Stats at NBA.com
- Stats at Basketball Reference

Sean Curtis Green (born February 2, 1970) is an American former professional basketball player, a USA Triathlon-certified triathlon coach, and former head coach of the girls' basketball team at the Convent of the Sacred Heart Prep School. He presently resides in California, works in sports performance and hosts a podcast named The “Let Me Cook” podcast.

== Playing career ==
Green began his high school career playing for August Martin High School and the AAU program at Riverside Church that also featured Malik Sealy and Kenny Anderson.

Green eventually transferred to Oak Hill Academy in 1987 under head coach Steve Smith. He then attended North Carolina State University for one season under Jim Valvano before transferring to Iona College where he finished his college basketball career. In his senior season, Green averaged 23.2 points, 5.2 rebound and 1.7 steals, leading to a First Team All-MAAC selection.

Green was selected 41st overall by the Indiana Pacers in the 1991 NBA draft, and became the last Gael to have played in an NBA game until Scott Machado had a short stint with the Houston Rockets in 2012. After playing two years with Indiana, Green opted to be traded to the Philadelphia 76ers. At the midpoint of his third year Green was traded to the Utah Jazz (with Jeff Hornacek), where he finished the 1994 season, and his NBA venture.

Green went on to play eight more years professionally in Europe, Asia, and South America: Venezuela (Puerto La Cruz 1994 and 1997 and Guanare 2002), Israel (Maccabi Jerusalem 1995), Italy (Milano 1996 and Napoli 1997), Philippines (Manila 1997 and 2000), Turkey (Istanbul 1998–2000) and France (Dijon 2001).

In 2004, Green created Green Storm Fitness LLC, a duathlon and triathlon racing team and personal and multisport training company based in New York City's metropolitan area. In 2010, Green took over the girls' varsity basketball program at the Convent of the Sacred Heart preparatory school in Greenwich, CT. In just two years, the Tigers improved from a 4–14 record, to 18–7 in 2012, capturing their first Fairchester Athletic Association league and tournament championship in 23 years. After a successful 4 years of coaching at Convent of the Sacred Heart (57–28) from 2010 to 2014, Green coached and trained athletes throughout the NYC Metro area. He has worked with celebrities such as Philip Seymour Hoffman, Adam Yauch, Sam Mendes, Emma Roberts and Sam Rockwell, and NBA players such as Jerryd Bayless.
