= Or Goren =

Israeli basketball player (born 1956)

Or Goren אור גורן
Personal information
- Born: October 20, 1956 (age 70) Israel
- Listed height: 6 ft 3 in (1.91 m)

Career information
- College: University of Houston
- Playing career: 1973–1993
- Position: Shooting guard

Or Goren (Hebrew: אור גורן; born October 20, 1956) is an Israeli former basketball player. He played the shooting guard position. He scored the fifth-most career points in Israeli Basketball Premier League history, and also played for the Israeli national basketball team.

== Biography ==
Goren was born in Israel, and lived in Kibbutz Mishmar HaEmek, Israel. His father Adam was a basketball player. He is 6 feet 3 inches (191 cm) tall.

He attended the University of Houston, and played basketball for the Houston Cougars in 1978–80.

Goren played for Hapoel Megido, Hapoel Gvat/Yagur, Hapoel Ramat Gan, Elitzur Netanya, Hapoel Galil Elyon, Beitar Tel Aviv, and Maccabi Hadera from 1973 to 1993. He scored 6,606 career points in the Israeli Basketball Premier League, 5th-most in league history.

He played for the Israeli national basketball team. Goren played in the 1973 FIBA European Championship for Cadets, 1974 FIBA European Championship for Junior Men, 1975 FIBA European Championship for Men, 1976 FIBA European Olympic Qualifying Tournament for Men, 1976 FIBA Pre-Olympic Basketball Tournament, 1977 FIBA European Championship for Men, and 1980 FIBA European Olympic Qualifying Tournament for Men.

== See also ==
- Israeli Premier League Statistical Leaders
