= Boaz Janay =

Israeli basketball player

Boaz Janay בועז ינאי
Personal information
- Born: November 9, 1952 (age 74) Nahalal, Israel
- Listed height: 6 ft 6.5 in (1.99 m)

Career information
- Playing career: 1971–1989
- Position: Center

Career history
- 1971–1979: Hapoel Gvat/Yagur
- 1979–1980: Hapoel Tel Aviv
- 1980–1985: Hapoel Afula
- 1986–1989: Hapoel Gvat

Career highlights
- Israeli State Cup winner (1976); Israeli Premier League Top Scorer (1979)
Medals
Representing Israel
Men's basketball
FIBA EuroBasket
| Silver medal – second place | 1979 Italy |
Asian Games
| Gold medal – first place | 1974 Iran |
Maccabiah Games
| Silver medal – second place | 1977 Tel Aviv |

Boaz Janay (Hebrew: בועז ינאי; also Yanay or Yanai; born November 9, 1952) is an Israeli former basketball player. He scored a total of 6,985 career points in the Israeli Premier League, which is the 4th-most points scored all-time in the league's history. He also represented the Israeli national team.

== Club career ==
During his club career, Janay, who is 1.99 m (6'6 1/2") tall, played at the center position. Janay played a total of 16 seasons of club basketball in Israel. He played with the Israeli clubs Hapoel Gvat/Yagur, Hapoel Tel Aviv, and Hapoel Gilboa/Afula, between 1971 and 1989. During his Israeli club career, Janay scored 6,985 points, which is the 4th-most points scored in the history of the Israeli Premier League. His career scoring average in the Israeli Premier League was 20.2 points per game.

== National team career ==
Janay was a member of the senior men's Israeli national team. At the 1977 Maccabiah Games, he won a silver medal with Team Israel. He also won a gold medal with Israel at the 1974 Asian Games.

Janay also played with Israel at the following tournaments: 1971 FIBA European Championship, the 1972 FIBA European Olympic Qualifying Tournament, the 1973 FIBA European Championship, the 1975 FIBA European Championship, the 1976 FIBA European Olympic Qualifying Tournament, the 1977 FIBA European Championship, the 1979 FIBA European Championship, the 1980 FIBA European Olympic Qualifying Tournament, and the 1981 FIBA European Championship.

== See also ==
- Israeli Premier League Statistical Leaders
