= Amos Frishman =

Israeli basketball player

Amos Frishman עמוס פרישמן
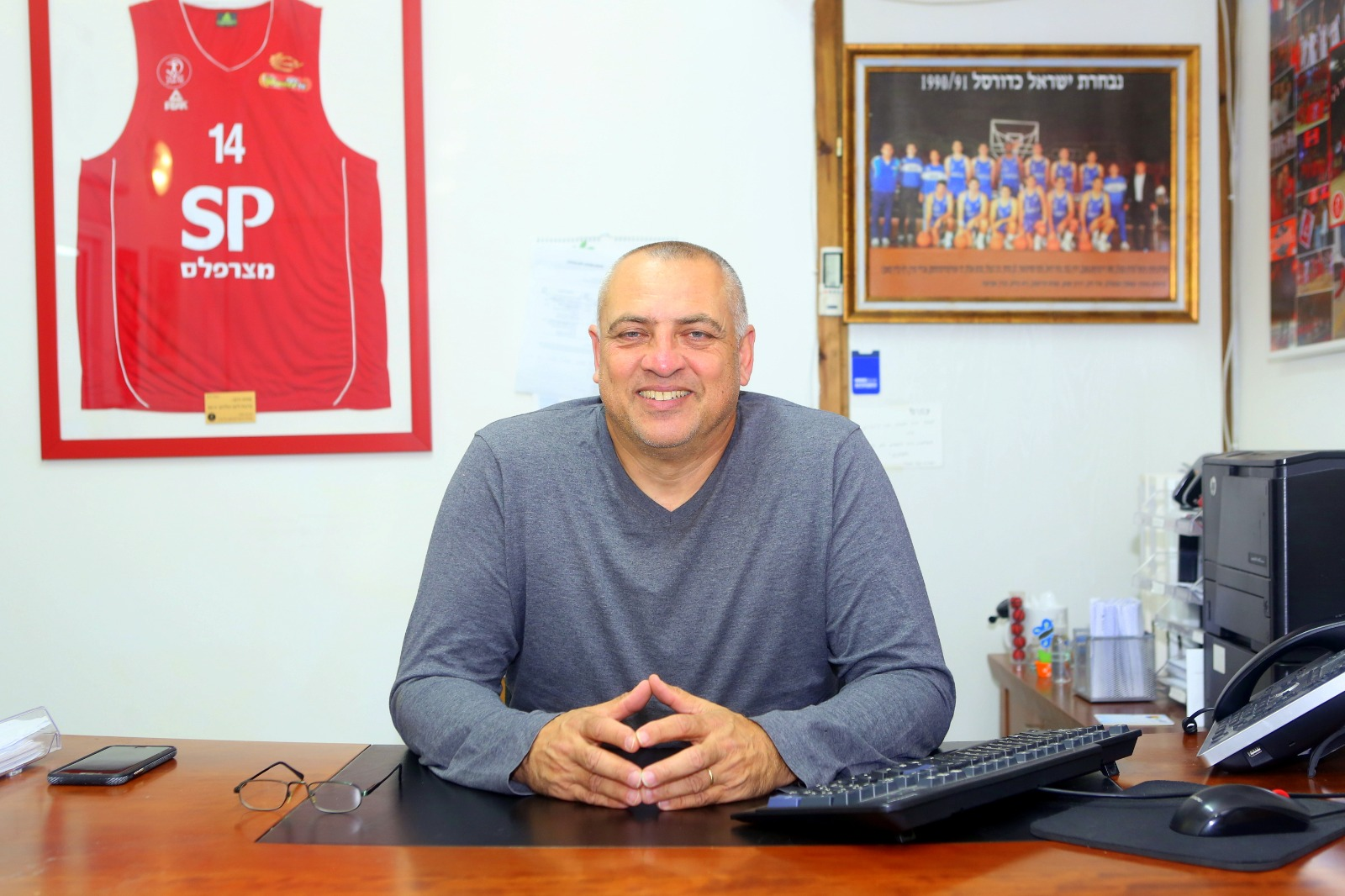

Personal information
- Born: September 20, 1965 (age 61)
- Listed height: 6 ft 0 in (1.83 m)
- Position: point guard

Career highlights
- Israeli Premier League Assists Leader (1991)

Amos Frishman (Hebrew: עמוס פרישמן; born September 20, 1964) is an Israeli former basketball player who played point guard for Israel and in the Israel Basketball Premier League, and is 1.84 metres tall.

== Basketball career ==
Frishman played in the Israel Basketball Premier League from 1981-96. In 1991 he was the Israeli Premier League Assists Leader, with 5.4 per game.

He competed for the Israel men's national basketball team in the FIBA 1980 European Championship for Cadets: Final Round averaging 26.5 points per game, the FIBA 1981 European Championship for Junior Men averaging 14.1 points per game, and for the Israel men's national basketball team in the FIBA 1988 European Olympic Qualifying Tournament for Men averaging 9 points per game.

In 2017 Frishman was the Chairman of the Israel Basketball Association professional committee.
