= Rotem (name) =

Rotem (Hebrew: רותם) is a Hebrew given name and a surname. Notable people with the name include:

== Surname ==
- David Rotem (1949-2015), Israeli politician
- Elam Rotem, composer, singer and harpsichordist
- J. R. Rotem, American record producer
- Simcha Rotem (1924-2018), one of the heads of the Warsaw Ghetto Uprising
- Yuval Rotem, Israeli diplomat

== Given name ==
- Rotem Abuhav (born 1976), Israeli actress
- Rotem Erlich (born 1969), Israeli basketball player
- Rotem Gafinovitz (born 1992), Israeli Olympic road cyclist
- Rotem Kowner, Israeli historian and psychologist
- Rotem Or, known as Totemo, Israeli musician and producer
- Rotem Sela, Israeli actress, model, and television host
