= Albert Hemmo =

Israeli former basketball player

Albert Hemmo אברהם חמו
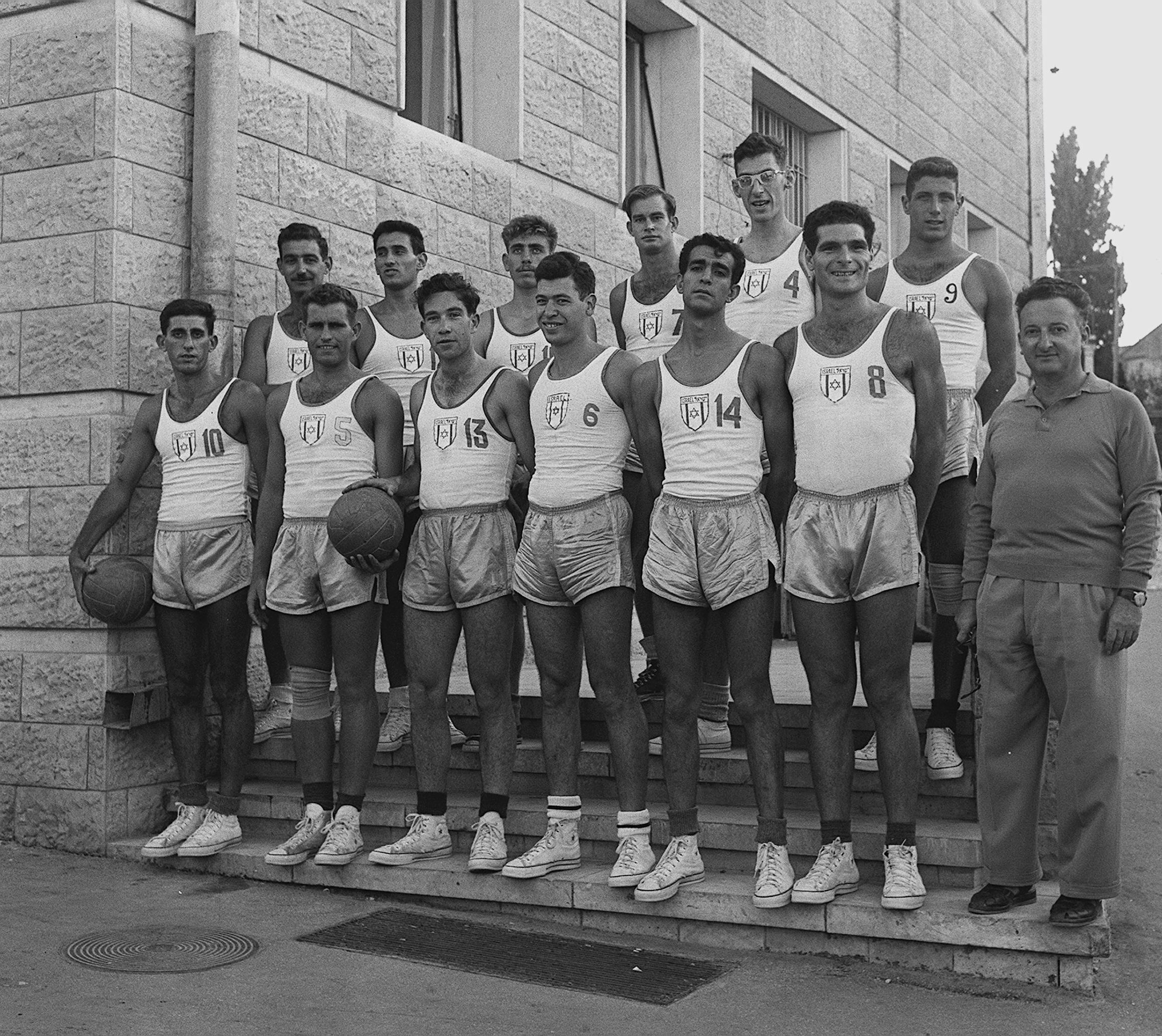
- Albert Hemmo (first row, player on right hand side), with the Israeli national team, 1960

Personal information
- Born: July 8, 1934 (age 92) Cairo, Egypt
- Listed height: 6 ft 4 in (1.93 m)

Career information
- Playing career: 1954–1981
- Coaching career: 1965–1987

Career history

Playing
- 1954–1973: Hapoel Haifa
- 1973–1976: Maccabi Tel Aviv
- 1976–1979: Maccabi South Tel Aviv
- 1980–1981: Maccabi Ramat Gan

Coaching
- 1965–1967: Hapoel Gvat
- 1967–1969: Maccabi Ramat Gan
- 1969–1970: Hapoel Haifa
- 1970–1973: Hapoel Megido
- 1973–1975: Israel
- 1975: Hapoel Gvat
- 1978–1979: Elitzur Tel Aviv
- 1979–1980: Maccabi Ramat Gan
- 1985: Elitzur Kiryat Ono
- 1986–1987: Hapoel Ramat Gan

Career highlights
- As player: 3× Israeli Premier League champion (1974–1976); Israeli State Cup winner (1975); Israeli Premier League Top Scorer (1960)

Albert Abraham Hemmo (alternate spellings: Avraham, Hammo, Hemo, Hamo, Hebrew: אברהם חמו; born July 8, 1934) is an Israeli former basketball player and coach. He played in the Israeli Premier League, and also for the Israeli national team.

== Club career ==
Hemmo, who is 6 ft 4 in (1.93 m), was born in Cairo, Egypt, and is Jewish. In Egypt, he played basketball for Maccabi Cairo. He immigrated from Egypt to Israel in 1948.

He played 15 seasons in the Israeli Premier League. During that time, Hemmo played for Hapoel Haifa, Hapoel Ramat Gan, Hapoel Gvat, and Hapoel Megido.

== National team career ==
Hemmo played for the senior men's Israeli national team in the 1959 FIBA European Championship, the 1961 FIBA European Championship, the 1963 FIBA European Championship, and the 1964 FIBA European Olympic Qualifying Tournament.

== Coaching career ==
After he retired from playing club basketball, Hemmo became a basketball coach. From 1973 to 1975, he was the head coach of the senior men's Israeli national team.

== Personal life ==
Hemmo was a policeman, in the Israel Police by profession, and he eventually became a deputy chief of police, in the Yarkon region.

== See also ==
- Sports in Israel
