= Derrick Gervin =

American basketball player (born 1963)

Personal information
- Born: March 28, 1963 (age 63) Detroit, Michigan, U.S.
- Listed height: 6 ft 8 in (2.03 m)
- Listed weight: 200 lb (91 kg)

Career information
- High school: Martin Luther King (Detroit, Michigan)
- College: UTSA (1981–1985)
- NBA draft: 1985: 4th round, 90th overall pick
- Drafted by: Philadelphia 76ers
- Playing career: 1985–2001
- Position: Small forward
- Number: 24, 30

Career history
- 1985–1986: Evansville Thunder
- 1987–1988: Córdoba 1ºB
- 1989–1990: Santa Barbara Islanders
- 1990–1991: New Jersey Nets
- 1991–1992: Fort Wayne Fury
- 1992: La Crosse Catbirds
- 1992–1993: Boca Juniors
- 1993: Oklahoma City Cavalry
- 1993: La Crosse Catbirds
- 1993: Robe di Kappa Torino
- 1993–1994: Galatasaray
- 1994–1996: Hapoel Gvat/Yagur
- 1996–1997: Fort Wayne Fury
- 1997–1998: Maccabi Kiryat Motzkin
- 2000–2001: Detroit Wheels

Career highlights
- Israeli League MVP (1995); 2× Israeli League Top Scorer (1996, 1998); CBA champion (1992); All-CBA First Team (1990); CBA scoring champion (1990); No. 30 retired by UTSA Roadrunners
- Stats at NBA.com
- Stats at Basketball Reference

Derrick Gervin (born March 28, 1963) is an American former professional basketball player born in Detroit. He played in the National Basketball Association (NBA) and was the 1995 Israeli Basketball Premier League MVP, and a two-time top scorer in the Israel Basketball League, in 1996 and 1998.

== Biography ==
A 6' 8" forward from University of Texas at San Antonio (UTSA), Gervin was selected by the Philadelphia 76ers in the 4th round (20th pick, 90th overall) of the 1985 NBA draft. He played two seasons (1989–1991) in the National Basketball Association (NBA) as a member of the New Jersey Nets. He averaged 8.8 points per game in 77 games.

Gervin played in the Continental Basketball Association (CBA) for the Evansville Thunder, Santa Barbara Islanders, Fort Wayne Fury, La Crosse Catbirds and Oklahoma City Cavalry from 1985 to 1997. He won a CBA championship with the Catbirds in 1992. He was selected to the All-CBA First Team in 1990.

He was the 1995 Israeli Basketball Premier League MVP, playing and averaging 27.0 points per game for Hapoel Gvat/Yagur. He was also a two-time top scorer in the Israel Basketball League, in 1996 and 1998.

Gervin's jersey was retired by UTSA in 2006. His older brother, George Gervin, played in the ABA from 1972 to 1976 and in the NBA from 1976 to 1986.
