= Gabi Teichner =

Israeli basketball player

Gabi Teichner גבי טייכנר
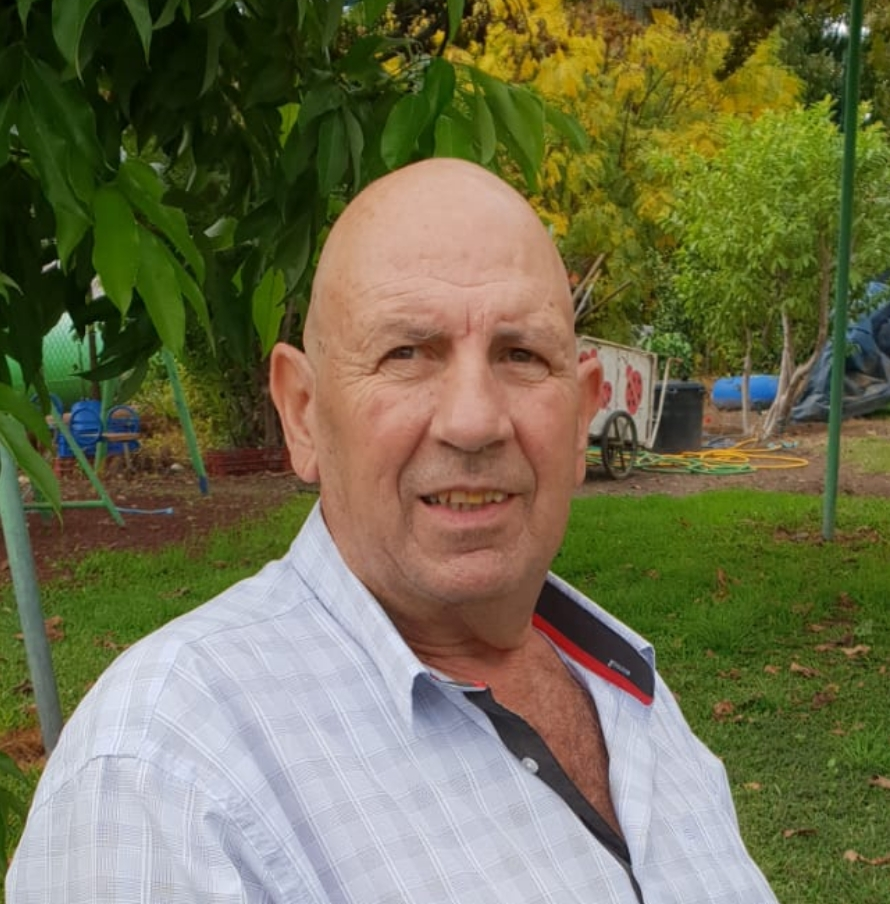
- Teichner in 2018

Personal information
- Born: November 21, 1945 (age 80) Afula, Israel
- Listed height: 2.03 m (6 ft 8 in)

Career information
- Playing career: 1963–1979
- Position: Center

Career history
- 1963–1965: Hapoel Beit Alfa
- 1968–1974: Hapoel Nir David
- 1974–1979: Hapoel Gvat/Yagur

Career highlights
- Israeli State Cup winner (1976); 2× Israeli Premier League Top Scorer (1971, 1972); 4× Israeli Premier League Quintet (1969–1972)
Medals
Representing Israel
Men's basketball
Asian Games
Silver medal – second place	1970 Thailand
Maccabiah Games
Gold medal – first place	1969 Tel Aviv

Gabriel "Gabi" Teichner (Hebrew: גבי טייכנר; born November 21, 1945) is an Israeli former basketball player. He spent his club career playing in the Israeli Premier League, and he also represented the Israeli national team.

== Club career ==
Teichner, who is 2.03 m (6 ft 8 in) tall, played at the center position. During his club playing career, Teichner played 13 seasons in the Israeli Premier League, with the clubs Hapoel Beit Alfa, Hapoel Nir David, and Hapoel Gvat/Yagur. He had a career scoring average of 15.8 points per game in the Israeli Premier League.

== National team career ==
Teichner also played with the senior men's Israeli national team. He was a member of the Israeli teams that competed at the following major tournaments: the 1967 FIBA European Championship, the 1968 FIBA European Olympic Qualifying Tournament, the 1969 FIBA European Championship, the 1970 Asian Games, the 1971 FIBA European Championship, and the 1972 FIBA Pre-Olympic Tournament.

At the 1969 Maccabiah Games, he played with the legendary Israeli player Tal Brody, on the gold-medal winning Israeli basketball team. He also won a silver medal with Israel at the 1970 Asian Games.

== Personal life ==
Teichner has lived in both Kibbutz Nir David, and Kibbutz Degania Bet, in Israel.
