= Dennis Williams (basketball) =

American basketball player

Personal information
- Born: June 27, 1965 (age 60) Charleston, South Carolina, U.S.
- Listed height: 6 ft 5 in (1.96 m)
- Listed weight: 190 lb (86 kg)

Career information
- High school: Bishop England (Charleston, South Carolina)
- College: Georgia (1983–1987)
- NBA draft: 1987: 5th round, 96th overall pick
- Drafted by: San Antonio Spurs
- Position: Shooting guard

Career history
- 1990: Albany Patroons
- 1990: Oklahoma City Cavalry
- 1990–1991: Yakima Sun Kings

Career highlights
- Israel Basketball Premier League Top Scorer (1993)
- Stats at Basketball Reference

Dennis Williams (born June 27, 1965) is an American former professional basketball player. He played for Hapoel Tel Aviv in the Israeli Premier League, and for FC Barcelona Banca Catalana in the Liga ACB and the EuroLeague. He was the top scorer in the 1993 Israel Basketball Premier League.

== Biography ==
Williams was born in Charleston, South Carolina.

He played basketball for four seasons for the University of Georgia, averaging 8.9 points per game for the Bulldogs, graduating in 1987. Williams played guard, and in 1986–87 as he averaged 15.7 points per game he was 6th in the Southeastern Conference with 50 steals and 1.7 steals per game, and 10th with 192 field goals.

Williams was drafted in the 5th round of the 1987 NBA draft by the San Antonio Spurs.

Williams played two seasons (1987–89) for Hapoel Tel Aviv in the Israeli Premier League, averaging 23.6 points per game. He was the top scorer in the 1993 Israel Basketball Premier League.

He played for FC Barcelona Banca Catalana, which competes in the Liga ACB and the EuroLeague, in 1993–94, averaging 13.2 points per game. Williams also played parts of two seasons in the Continental Basketball Association (CBA) for three teams (Albany Patroons, Oklahoma City Cavalry and Yakima Sun Kings), averaging 13.2 points over 53 games.
