= Ofer Eshed =

Israeli basketball player and coach

Ofer Eshed עופר אשד
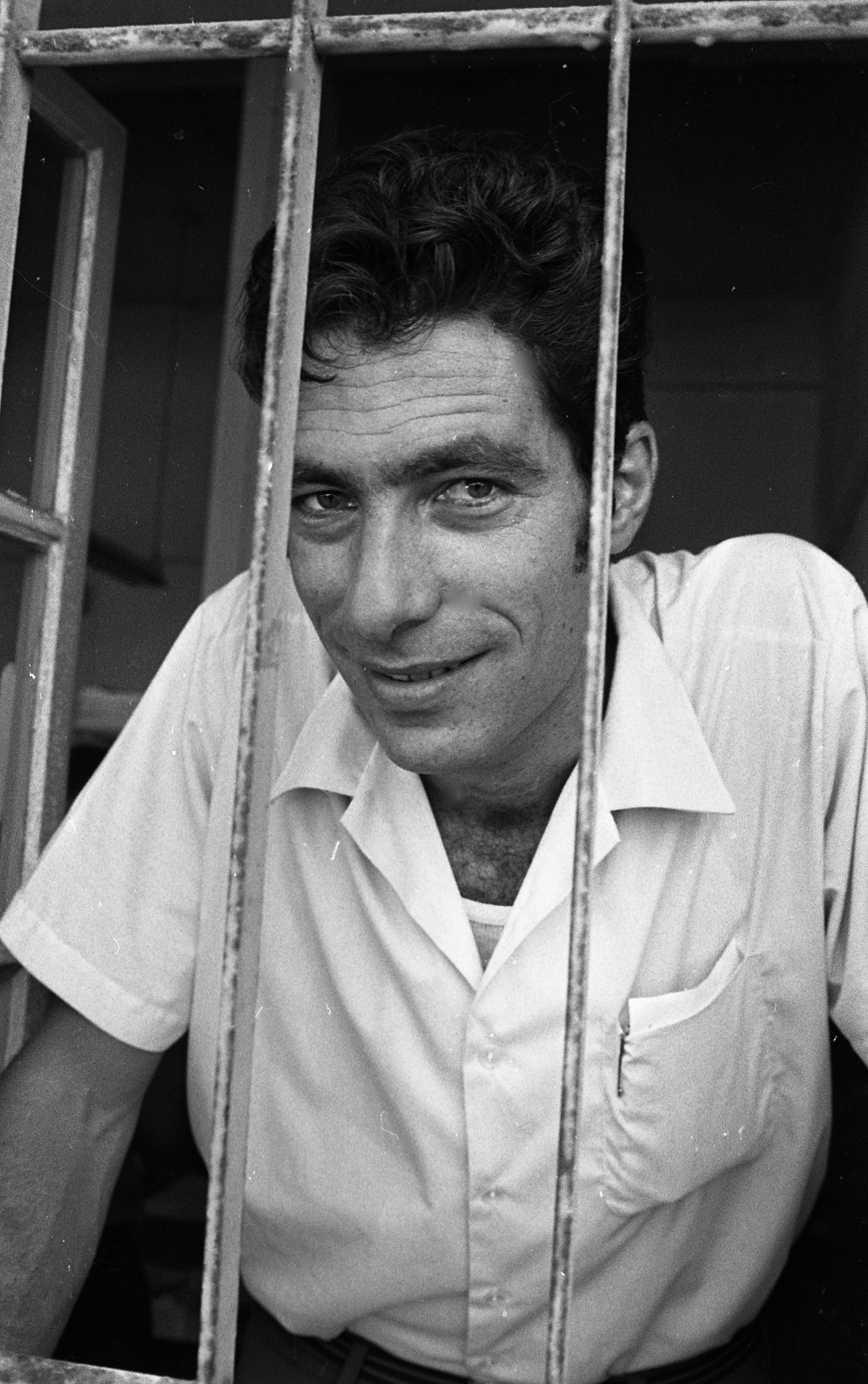
- Eshed in 1969

Personal information
- Born: November 24, 1942
- Died: June 23, 2007 (aged 64)
- Listed height: 6 ft 5 in (1.96 m)

Career information
- Playing career: 1958–1978
- Position: Shooting guard / small forward
- Coaching career: 1995–1997

Career history

Playing
- 1958–1972: Hapoel Holon
- 1972–1974: Hapoel Tel Aviv
- 1974–1975: Maccabi Holon
- 1975–1978: Beitar Tel Aviv

Coaching
- 1995–1997: Hapoel Tel Aviv

Career highlights
- As player: 6× Israeli Premier League Top Scorer (1961–1963, 1965, 1967, 1970)
Medals
Men's basketball
Representing Israel
Asian Games
Gold medal – first place	1966 Thailand

Ofer Eshed (alternate spellings: Offer, Ashad; Hebrew: עופר אשד; November 24, 1942 – June 23, 2007) was an Israeli basketball player and coach. He played and coached in the Israeli Premier League, and he is the third in the league in career scoring. He also played for and was the Captain of the Israeli national team.

== Club career ==
Eshed played 20 seasons of club basketball with Hapoel Holon, Hapoel Tel Aviv, and Beitar Tel Aviv, from 1958 to 1978. In his highest-scoring season, in 1970, he averaged 29.9 points per game. He scored a total of 7,758 career points, which is the third-most in the history of the Israeli Premier League.

== National team career ==
Eshed represented the senior men's Israeli national team, he also served as Israel's Team Captain. With Israel, he played at the 1961 FIBA EuroBasket, the 1963 FIBA EuroBasket, the 1965 FIBA EuroBasket, the 1967 FIBA EuroBasket, and the 1969 FIBA EuroBasket.

Eshed also played at the 1964 FIBA European Olympic Qualifying Tournament, and the 1968 FIBA European Olympic Qualifying Tournament.

== Coaching career ==
After he retired from playing club basketball, Eshed became a basketball coach. He was an Assistant Coach for Hapoel Tel Aviv, from 1995 to 1997.

== See also ==
- Israeli Premier League Statistical Leaders
