= Hubert Roberts =

American-Israeli basketball player

Hubert Roberts יוברט רוברטס
Personal information
- Born: January 21, 1961 (age 65)
- Listed height: 6 ft 8 in (2.03 m)

Career information
- College: San Diego University
- Position: Center

Hubert Roberts (Hebrew: יוברט רוברטס; born January 21, 1961) is an American-Israeli former basketball player. He played the center position. He played nine seasons in the Israel Basketball Premier League.

== Biography ==
His mother was of Jewish descent. Roberts is 6 ft 8 in (2.03 m) tall. He played for San Diego University.

Roberts played nine seasons in the Israel Basketball Premier League for Hapoel Haifa, Hapoel Jerusalem, Maccabi Haifa, and Rishon LeZion. He observed: "I have kids. The atmosphere for child rearing is better here than in 85 percent of the places in the States for blacks."
