= Howard Lassoff =

American-Israeli basketball player

Howard Lassoff הווארד לסוף
Personal information
- Born: October 15, 1955 Philadelphia, Pennsylvania, U.S.
- Died: February 7, 2013 (aged 57) Wynnewood, Pennsylvania, U.S.
- Listed height: 6 ft 10 in (2.08 m)

Career information
- High school: Lower Merion High School (Ardmore, Pennsylvania)
- College: American (1974-1978)
- Position: Center

Career history
- 1978-1981: Hapoel Haifa
- 1981-1987: Maccabi Tel Aviv
- 1987-1990: Hapoel Tel Aviv
- 1990-1991: Ramat Hasheron
- 1991-1992: Maccabi Hadera
- 1992-1993: Hapoel Jerusalem

Howard Alan Lassoff (Hebrew: הווארד לסוף; October 15, 1955 – February 7, 2013) was an American-Israeli basketball player. He also played in Israel for 14 years.

== Early life and education ==
Lassoff was born in Philadelphia to Irving and Hilda Lassoff. He was the second of four children. He had an older sister Debbie and two younger brothers, Barry and Louis. He spent his early years living inside the city of Philadelphia. Eventually the Lassoff family moved to Lower Merion Township, Pennsylvania, a suburb of Philadelphia, where his love of basketball began.

Initially interested in tennis, Lassoff grew to 6 feet 10 inches tall. He became interested in basketball while a student at Lower Merion High School in Ardmore, Pennsylvania. He became the starting center on the Lower Merion Team. In 1974 his high school team competed in the Central League first Half Championship. Lower Merion lost in the final game.

While in high school, Lassoff starred for the US in the 1977 Maccabiah Games in Israel, where his coach was Dolph Schayes and with Danny Schayes, Ernie Grunfeld, and Willie Sims also on the team it won a gold medal.

Lassoff went on to play college basketball on a scholarship at NCAA Division I American University in Washington, D.C., where his coach was Philadelphian Jim Lynam, who later coached St. Joseph's University in Philadelphia and the Portland Trail Blazers and the Philadelphia 76ers in the National Basketball Association. He was a four-year varsity letterman and a three-year starting center. In his senior year, the American University Eagles went to the East Coast Conference Championships game, losing to Temple University. Lassoff graduated with a BS degree in Criminal Justice.

== Career ==
After graduating from American University, Lassoff went on to have a 15-year professional career in Israel. He played for Hapoel Haifa, Maccabi Tel Aviv, Hapoel Tel Aviv, Ramat Hasheron, Maccabi Hadera, and Hapoel Jerusalem.

In 1981 and 1986, his team lost in the finals to the Tracer Milan team. Bob McAdoo and Mike D'Antoni played for Milan. Lassoff later said that McAdoo was the most difficult player to guard in his entire career. Lassoff went on to become the starting center for the Israeli national basketball team from 1982 to 1991, and played in over 100 games for the national team. He played many games against some of the finest basketball players in the world, many of whom would play in the NBA. He guarded players such as Bob McAdoo, Rik Smits, Vlade Divac, Arvydas Sabonis, Toni Kukoč, and Drazen Petrovic.

Lassoff was inducted into the Philadelphia Jewish Sports Hall of Fame, class of 2011.

== Death ==
Lassoff died on February 7, 2013, at Lankenau Medical Center in Wynnewood, Pennsylvania. He was survived by his longtime partner, Beth Bressler, and two children, Alex, a soldier in the US Army, and Josh, an aspiring musician and college student. Also surviving him were his grandson Avi, as well as his parents Hilda and Irv Lassoff, sister Debbie, his two brothers Barry and Louis, and many nieces and nephews.

== See also ==
- List of select Jewish basketball players
