= Abraham Hoffman =

Israeli basketball player (1938–2015)

Abraham Hoffman אברהם הופמן
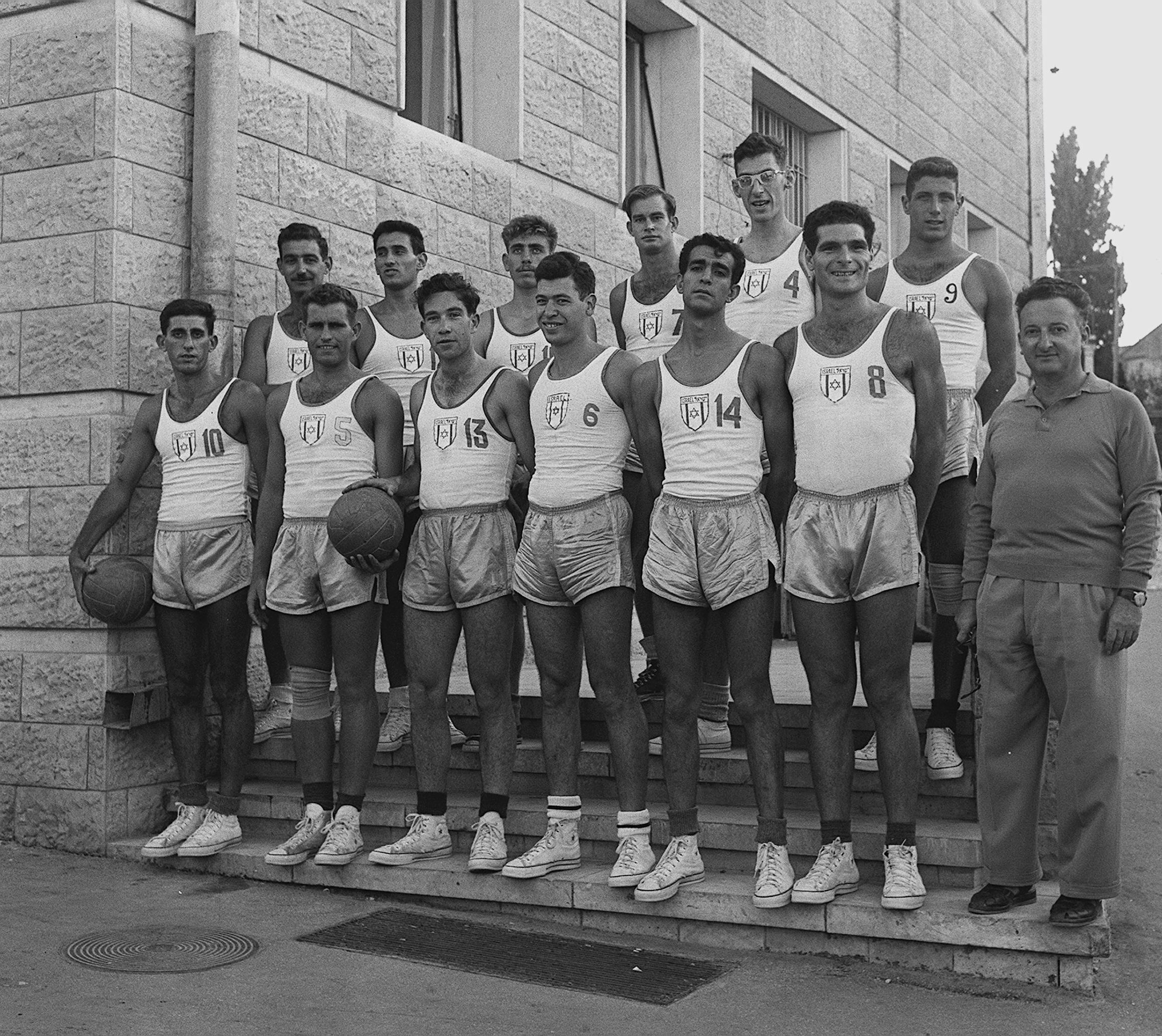
- Hoffman (first row, third from the left), with the Israeli national team, 1960

Personal information
- Born: October 2, 1938 Jerusalem, Land of Israel
- Died: April 26, 2015 (aged 76)
- Listed height: 1.90 m (6 ft 3 in)

Career information
- Playing career: 1955–1968
- Position: Power forward

Career history
- 1955–1963: Maccabi Jerusalem
- 1963–1968: Maccabi Tel Aviv

Career highlights
- 3× Israeli Premier League champion (1964, 1967, 1968); 3× Israeli State Cup winner (1964–1966); Israeli Premier League Top Scorer (1959)

Abraham Hoffman (alternate spelling: Avraham, Hebrew: אברהם הופמן; October 2, 1938 – April 26, 2015) was an Israeli basketball player. He played in the Israeli Premier League. He was the Israeli Premier League's Top Scorer in 1959. Hoffman also represented the Israeli national team.

== Club career ==
Hoffman, who was born and raised in Jerusalem, Land of Israel, was a 1.90 m (6 ft 3 in) tall power forward. He played 13 seasons in the Israeli Premier League, from 1955 to 1968, for Maccabi Jerusalem and Maccabi Tel Aviv.

As a member of Maccabi Jerusalem, Hoffman was the Israeli Premier League Top Scorer in 1959. As a member of Maccabi Tel Aviv he won three Israeli Premier League championships, in the years 1964, 1967, and 1968. He also won three Israeli State Cups with Maccbi Tel Aviv, in the years 1964, 1965, and 1966.

== National team career ==
Hoffman also played for the senior men's Israeli national team. He competed in the 1961 FIBA European Championship, the 1963 FIBA European Championship, the 1965 FIBA European Championship, and the 1967 FIBA European Championship.

== Death ==
Hoffman died on 26 April 2015, at the age of 76. He was buried in Jerusalem.
