= Maccabi Jerusalem B.C. =

Basketball team in Israel

Maccabi Jerusalem
- Leagues: Liga Bet
- Founded: 1930; 96 years ago
- History: Maccabi Jerusalem B.C. (1930–2003); Re-established (2024-Present)
- Arena: Lerner Center
- Location: Jerusalem
- Team colors: Yellow and Blue
- CEO: Sahar Rachamim
- President: Ronnie Steinitz; Yossi Sharabi
- Head coach: Ofir Levi
Home	Away

Maccabi Jerusalem is an Israeli basketball team from the city of Jerusalem, currently playing in Liga Bet and having previously competed in the Israeli Basketball Premier League.

== History ==
The team was established in the 1930s. Before the founding of the state of Israel, and since there was no organized basketball league, the team participated in various tournaments and mainly in friendly matches against local teams such as Hapoel Jerusalem. During those days, the team was also known as "Maccabi Bar Kokhba Jerusalem" and won the Jerusalem League championship in 1941 and 1956.

The team began participating in the top league in the 1955 season and stayed there for nine consecutive seasons.

In 1959, the Israel Sports Association approved the team's participation in the ninth European tournament, the "Martini Cup," held in Paris. The team participated with two players from Maccabi Petah Tikva and one from Maccabi Kiryat Motzkin. In the tournament, besides Maccabi Jerusalem, five other teams participated, none of which were considered top European teams. Among them were four teams from France: Racing Paris, Saint-Charles d'Alfortville, Alsace Bannyol, and Stade Français, along with a Bulgarian team, Spartak Sofia. Ultimately, the team lost all of its games and finished in sixth and last place. Maccabi Jerusalem's participation in the tournament faced double criticism, both because Jerusalem was not considered a top Israeli basketball team and because they included player Avraham Hoffman, who was on the national team and was prohibited from participating in the tournament, playing under the alias "Moshe Shel."

Derby games against Hapoel Jerusalem were the highlight of Jerusalem basketball in the late 1950s and early 1960s. The second derby game in the 1961/62 season was interrupted after the crowd threatened the referees and threw objects at them. At that time, the team featured players like Avraham Hoffman, Israel Twil, Mordechai Tanuri, Ariel Cohen, Moshe Sharim, and Menachem Shirazi. During this period, it was the leading team in the city and was referred to as the "Dream Team." However, after the 1963/64 season, when the team was coached by David Kaminski (a prominent figure of Hapoel), the team dropped out of the top league and disappeared from the Israeli basketball scene for three decades, languishing in lower divisions.

In the 1993/94 season, the team finished second in National League B, tied on points with Maccabi Haifa, who finished third. However, a superior point difference gave Jerusalem the ticket to the Premier League.

In the 1994/95 season (the season it returned to the top league), the roster included seven homegrown players, strengthened by Joe Dawson, Sean Green, and Gilad Simchoni. The team finished in ninth place, defeating Hapoel Jerusalem in the second derby of the season.

In the following season (1995/96), it finished in tenth place (out of 12), after a crushing victory in the final round against Bnei Herzliya, 55–98. This victory ensured the team stayed in the league. However, the team was relegated to Liga Leumit B by the Budgetary Control Authority, claiming it could not meet the required financial guarantees. This was the first time in Israeli basketball that a team was relegated due to financial issues.

The team never recovered from this blow and was relegated to Liga Artzit. The youth department continued for another seven years. The club ultimately dissolved in 2003.

In total, the team played in the Premier League for 11 seasons over two stints. The all-time top scorer for the team is Avraham Hoffman, with 2,923 points in eight seasons with the team.

== Re-establishment ==
In 2024, the team was re-established by Roni Steinitz, the chairman of the Maccabi Jerusalem Association and former chairman of the original team in the 1990s, Sahar Rahamim, a fan of the original team, and Yossi Sharabi. In the 2024/2025 season, the team plays in the Jerusalem district of Liga Bet. The team hosts its games at the Lerner Center of the Hebrew University, located on Mount Scopus.
