= Elijah Stewart =

American basketball player (born 1995)

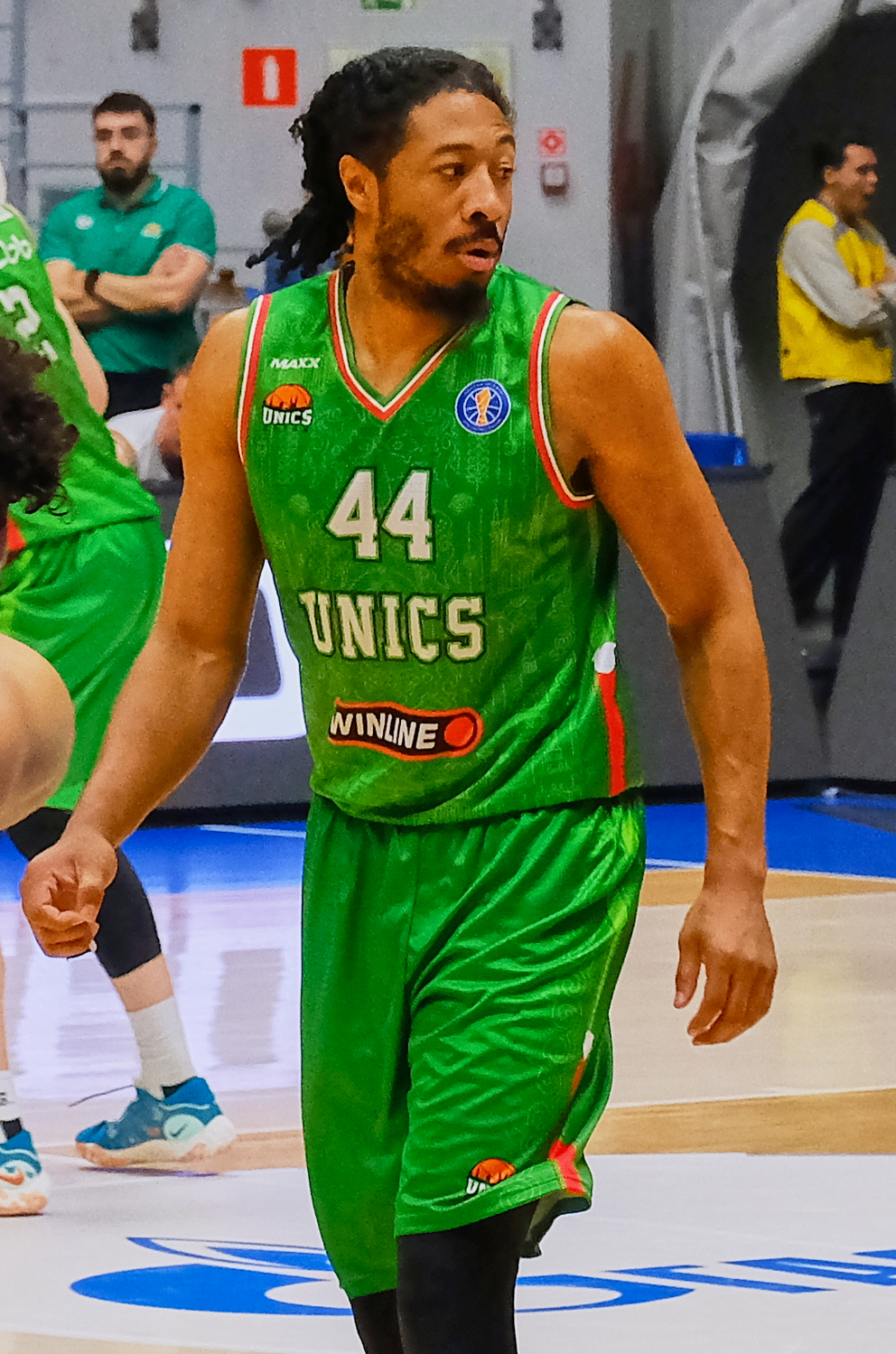

No. 44 – Al-Ula
- Position: Small forward
- League: Saudi Basketball League

Personal information
- Born: November 14, 1995 (age 30) DeRidder, Louisiana, U.S.
- Listed height: 6 ft 5 in (1.96 m)
- Listed weight: 194 lb (88 kg)

Career information
- High school: Westchester (Los Angeles, California)
- College: USC (2014–2018)
- NBA draft: 2018: undrafted
- Playing career: 2018–present

Career history
- 2018–2019: Fort Wayne Mad Ants
- 2019: Wisconsin Herd
- 2019: Stockton Kings
- 2019–2020: Helsinki Seagulls
- 2020–2021: Śląsk Wrocław
- 2021–2022: U-BT Cluj-Napoca
- 2022–2023: Napoli Basket
- 2023–2024: Hapoel Eilat
- 2024–2024: Scafati Basket
- 2025–2026: Bnei Herzliya
- 2026: UNICS Kazan
- 2026–present: Al-Ula

Career highlights
- All-Champions League Second Team (2022); Romanian League champion (2022); Israeli League Top Scorer (2024)
- Stats at Basketball Reference

Elijah Stewart (born November 14, 1995) is an American professional basketball player for Al-Ula of the Saudi Basketball League. He played college basketball for the USC Trojans. In high school, he was ranked as a four-star prospect in the Class of 2014. He was the Israeli Basketball Premier League Top Scorer in 2024.

== College career ==
Stewart played college basketball for the University of Southern California, where he left as the school's all-time leader in three-point field goals made with 245. He averaged 12.3 points and 3.9 rebounds per game as a junior. In the NCAA Tournament, Stewart scored 22 points and hit the game winning basket, in a win over SMU. After the season he declared for the NBA draft, but ultimately returned to college. As a senior, Stewart averaged 11.7 points and 3.0 rebounds per game. He was also strong on defense and finished with 21 blocks on the season, second on the team. He had a season-high 28 points in a victory over Oregon State on February 16.

== Professional career ==
=== Fort Wayne Mad Ants (2018–2019) ===
After graduating from USC, he went undrafted in the 2018 NBA draft. He later signed an Exhibit 10 deal with the Indiana Pacers, which included Summer League and training camp. Stewart was cut by the Pacers on October 11, 2018. He was subsequently added to the Fort Wayne Mad Ants training camp roster.

=== Wisconsin Herd (2019) ===
On January 22, 2019, the Fort Wayne Mad Ants announced that they had traded Stewart to the Wisconsin Herd with the returning player rights to Alex Hamilton for Jordan Barnett and Ike Nwamu. On March 8, 2019, Stewart was waived by the Herd.

=== Helsinki Seagulls (2019–2020) ===
On August 20, 2019, he signed with Helsinki Seagulls of the Finnish Korisliiga. He averaged 18.0 points, 5.2 rebounds, and 1.5 assists per game, while shooting 50.5% from the field, and 84.3% from the free throw line.

=== Śląsk Wrocław (2020–2021) ===
On July 15, 2020, he signed with Śląsk Wrocław of the Polish Basketball League. Stewart was named league player of the week on November 10, after contributing 30 points, six rebounds and two assists in a win against Wilki Morskie Szczecin. Stewart hit a game-winning shot of the decisive Game 3 of the league's bronze medal game against Legia Warsaw. He averaged 14.3 points, 4.1 rebounds, and 1.6 assists per game, while shooting 40.4% from three-point range.

=== U-BT Cluj-Napoca (2021–2022) ===
On August 6, 2021, he signed with U-BT Cluj-Napoca of the Romanian Liga Națională. He averaged 14.1 points, 3.6 rebounds, and 1.1 assists per game, while shooting 53.9% from the field, and 85.9% from the free throw line.

=== Napoli Basket (2022–2023) ===
On July 19, 2022, he signed with Napoli Basket of the Italian Lega Basket Serie A (LBA). He averaged 11.4 points, 2.8 rebounds, and 1.0 assists per game, while shooting 40.7% from three-point range, and 82.8% from the free throw line.

=== Hapoel Eilat (2023–2024) ===
On July 30, 2023, he signed with Hapoel Eilat of the Israeli Basketball Premier League. He averaged 20.4 points, 4.7 rebounds, and 2.1 assists per game. He was the Israeli Basketball Premier League Top Scorer in 2024.

=== Scafati Basket (2024–2025) ===
On June 19, 2024, he signed with Scafati Basket of the Lega Basket Serie A (LBA). He averaged 15.6 points, 3.4 rebounds, and 0.9 assists per game.

=== Bnei Herzliya (2025–2026) ===
As of March 2, 2025, he plays for Bnei Herzliya of the Israeli Basketball Premier League.
