= Hapoel Gvat/Yagur B.C. =

הפועל גבת\יגור Hapoel Gvat/Yagur
- Founded: 1953; 73 years ago
- Dissolved: 1996; 30 years ago
- History: 1953–1996
- Location: Gvat, Israel
- Championships: none

Hapoel Gvat/Yagur Basketball Club was a professional basketball team based in Gvat, Israel. The club had a rich history in the Israeli Basketball Super League and in 1976 they became the first basketball club outside of Tel Aviv to win a title with a victory over Hapoel Tel Aviv in the finals of the Israeli Basketball State Cup. They also finished in the top division as runners up to Maccabi Tel Aviv in 1972, 1976 and in 1978.

== Honours ==
- Domestic Championship:
  - Runners-up (3): 1971-72, 1975–76, 1977–78
- Israeli Basketball State Cup:
  - Winners (1): 1976
  - Runners-up (1): 1975

== Notable players ==
- Derrick Gervin (born 1963)
- Or Goren (born 1956)
- Albert Hemmo (born 1934)
- Boaz Janay (born 1952)
- Ari Rosenberg (born 1964)
- Gabi Teichner (born 1945)
- Ofer Yaakobi (born 1961)
- Ennis Whatley (born 1962)
