= Rotem Erlich =

Israeli basketball player

Rotem Erlich רותם ארליך
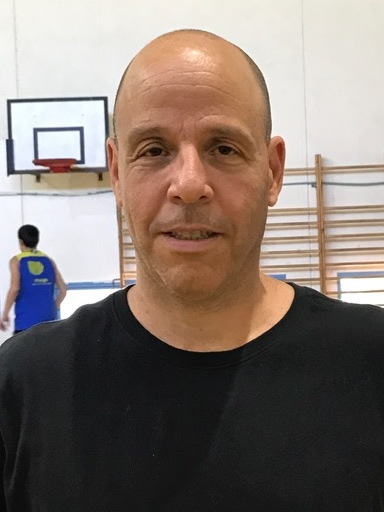

Personal information
- Born: April 10, 1969 (age 57)
- Position: point guard

Career highlights
- Israeli Premier League Assists Leader (1997)

Rotem Erlich (Hebrew: רותם ארליך; born April 10, 1969) is an Israeli former basketball player, who played for Israel and in the Israeli Basketball Premier League. In 1997 he was the Israeli Premier League Assists Leader.

== Basketball career ==
He played the point guard position, and is 1.88 metres tall.

Erlich played in the Israeli Basketball Premier League. In 1997 he was the Israeli Premier League Assists Leader, with 5.2.

He played for Israel in the FIBA 1988 European Championship for Junior Men.
