= Maccabi Hadera (basketball) =

מכבי חדרה Maccabi Hadera
- Leagues: Liga Artzit
- Location: Hadera, Israel
- Team colors: Blue, Yellow
Home	Away

Maccabi Hadera is an Israeli basketball team from the town of Hadera, Israel. The team competes in Liga Artzit, the third tier in the Israeli basketball pyramid. The club played in the Israeli Basketball Premier League in the 2000–2001 season.

== Notable players ==
- (Israel) Or Goren
- (United States) Shaleak Bryant
- (Israel) (United States) Howard Lassoff
