= Hapoel Haifa B.C. =

הפועל חיפה Hapoel Haifa
- Leagues: Liga Leumit
- Founded: 1930 (96 years ago)
- History: Hapoel Haifa B.C. 1930–present
- Arena: Romema Arena
- Capacity: 5,000
- Location: Haifa, Israel
- Team colors: Red, White
- President: Yuval Rusman
- Head coach: Sharon Drucker
- Team captain: Ofek Avital
- Ownership: Voluntary association "Hapoel Haifa B.C.- Red Heart"
- Website: www.hapoelhaifabc.co.il
Home	Away

Departments of Hapoel Haifa
Football	Basketball	Woman Basketball
Handball	Swimming	Judo

Hapoel Haifa Basketball Club is a professional basketball team based in Haifa, Israel. The club plays in the Liga Leumit, the second tier of professional Israeli basketball. It was founded in 1930, and is owned by Hapoel Haifa Supporters Trust - Ultras Gate 5.

== History ==
Hapoel Haifa was founded in 1924 in the port city of Haifa in the . It began to play basketball in the Israeli Basketball Premier League in 1955.

The club has a rich history, and has been part of the Israeli Basketball Premier League for many years. Hapoel Haifa finished as runner-up to Maccabi Tel Aviv in 1962 and 1965. It came in second in the competition for the Israeli State Cup, in 1970/1971, 1984/1985, 2008/2009, and 2012/2013.

In the 2011/12 season, its fans formed the club again. Hapoel Haifa was Israeli Artzit League Group North Runner-Up in 2015, and Champion in 2016, and Israeli National League Runner-Up in 2020.

In the 2019/20 season, the National League was interrupted due to the COVID-19 outbreak in Israel. Due to the interruption, the Israeli Basketball Association decided that the two teams leading the league would be promoted to the Israeli Basketball Premier League. As a result of this decision, Hapoel Haifa was announced as a promoted team to the Israeli Basketball Premier League.

Hapoel Haifa plays its home games in Romema Arena.

== Roster ==
Hapoel Haifa roster
Players
Coaches

Pos.	No.	Nat.	Name	Ht.	Age
PG	6	(Israel)	Alon, Amit	1.81 m (5 ft 11 in)	26 – 9 February 2000
PG	7	(Israel)	Ovadia, Rotem	1.88 m (6 ft 2 in)	31 – 21 April 1995
F	8	(Israel)	Itach, Avishai	2.01 m (6 ft 7 in)	20 – 8 March 2006
C	9	(Israel)	Tyus, Alex	2.03 m (6 ft 8 in)	38 – 8 January 1988
PF	10	(United States)	Allen, Robert	2.06 m (6 ft 9 in)	26 – 24 February 2000
SG	11	(United States)	Page, Jalen	1.94 m (6 ft 4 in)	24 – 22 September 2002
G	13	(Israel)	Levinstein, Rotem	1.88 m (6 ft 2 in)	25 – 19 October 2001
PG	14	(Israel)	Segal, Neta	1.87 m (6 ft 2 in)	31 – 19 July 1995
SG	18	(Israel)	Shneider, Itay	1.91 m (6 ft 3 in)	20 – 18 September 2006
SG	19	(Israel)	Gat, Shoham	1.88 m (6 ft 2 in)	24 – 10 August 2002
G	20	(Israel)	Dalid, Shon	1.85 m (6 ft 1 in)	19 – 12 May 2007
F/C	22	(Israel)	Levinson, Tomer	2.08 m (6 ft 10 in)	26 – 20 May 2000
PG	32	(Israel)	Yam, Yehonatan	1.83 m (6 ft 0 in)	27 – 2 February 1999
PG	36	(Israel)	Kozahinof, Danel	1.76 m (5 ft 9 in)	25 – 4 June 2001
G	45	(Israel)	Poleg, Eylon	1.93 m (6 ft 4 in)	21 – 26 September 2005

Head coach

- (Israel) Sharon Drucker

Assistant coach(es)

- (Israel) Tal Cohen
- (Israel) Ilan Amar
- (Israel) Ohad Zohar

Legend

- (C) Team captain
- Injured

- Roster
Updated: 1 August 2026

=== Depth chart ===
Pos.	Starting 5	Bench 1	Bench 2
C	Alex Tyus	Tomer Levinson	Eylon Poleg
PF	Robert Allen	Avishai Itach	Itay Shneider
SF	Jalen Page	Shoham Gat	Rotem Levinstein
SG	Yehonatan Yam	Shon Dalid	Rotem Ovadia
PG	Amit Alon	Neta Segal	Danel Kozahinof

- The Israeli League rule requires every team to have at least one Israeli on the court at any time.
- There should be at least 7 Israelis and up to 5 foreigners on a 12-men game sheet.

== Honors ==
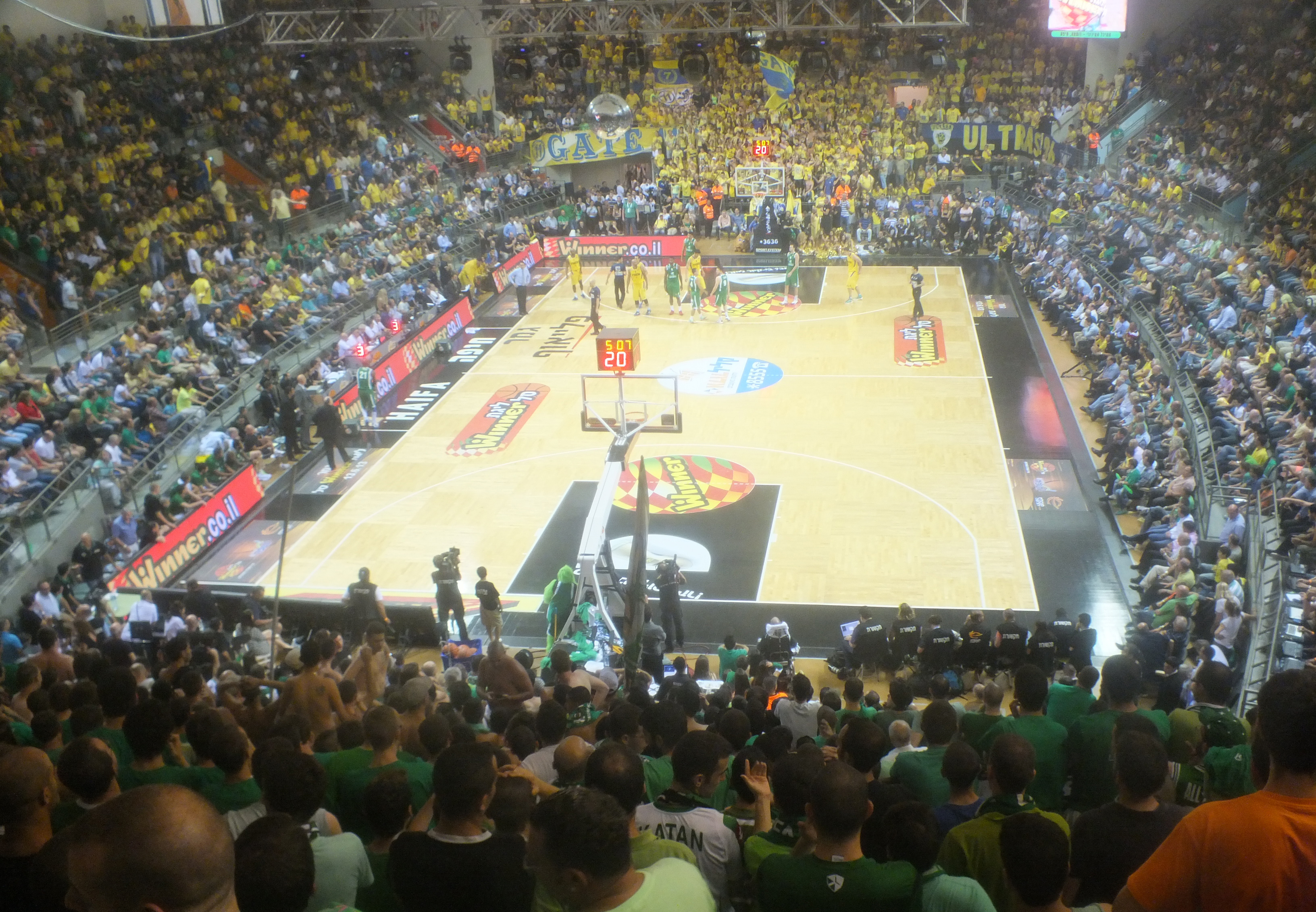
Romema Arena, the team's home stadium.

- Domestic Championship:
  - Runners-up (1): 1961–62,
- Israeli National League:
  - Champions (1): 1998-99
- Liga Bet:
  - Champions (1): 2006-07
- Liga Alef:
  - Champions (1): 2007-08
- Liga Artzit:
  - Champions (1): 2008-09
  - Champions (2): 2015/16

== Notable players ==
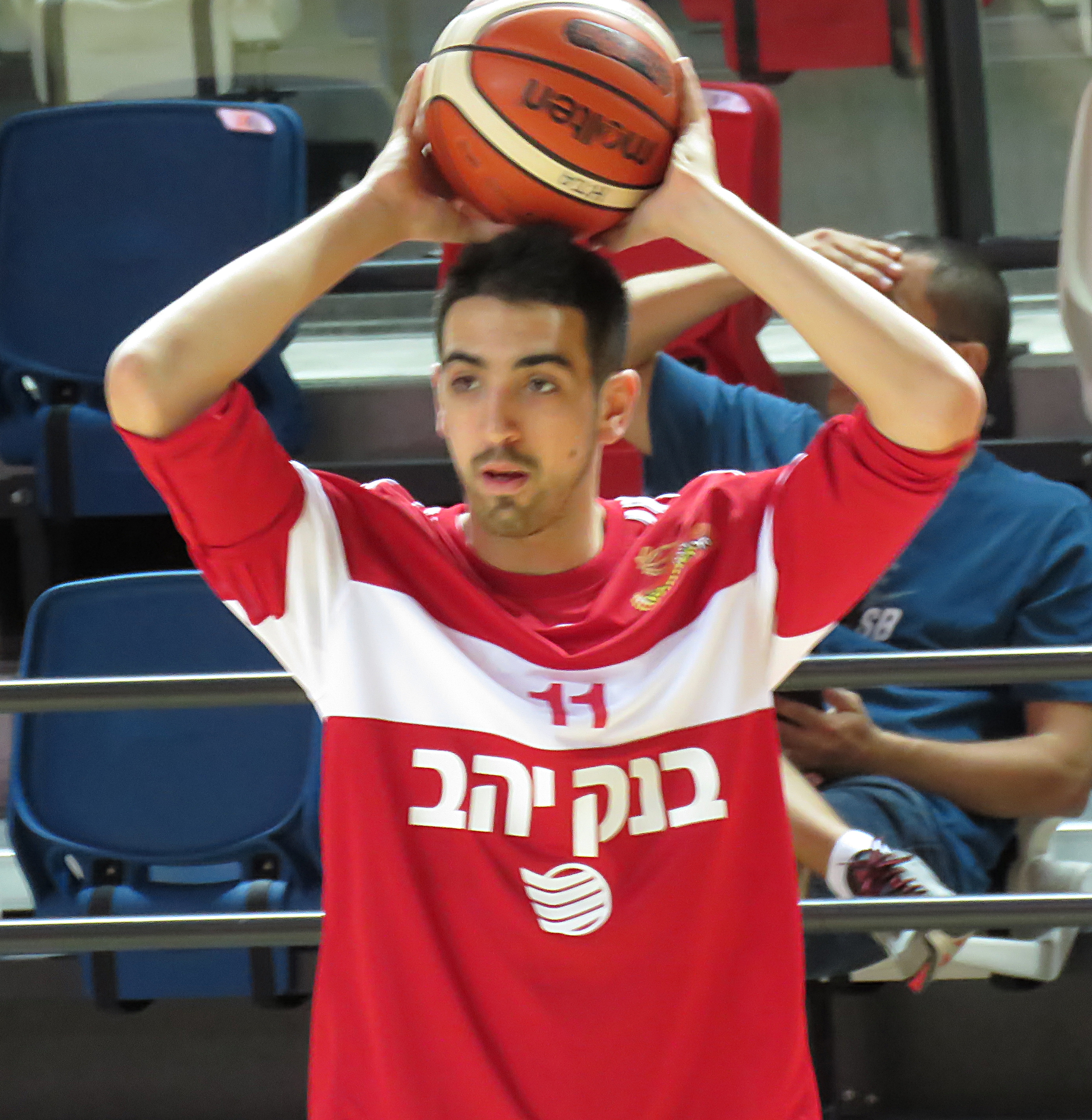
Bar Timor

- (Israel) Shimon Amsalem
- (United States) (Israel) Stanley Brundy
- (United States) (Israel) Cory Carr
- (Israel) Guy Goodes
- (Israel) Adi Gordon
- (Israel) Mickey Gorka
- (Israel) Albert Hemmo
- (United States) (Israel) Howard Lassoff
- (United States) (Israel) Barry Leibowitz
- (United States) (Israel) Jake Pemberton
- (United States) (Israel) Hubert Roberts
- (United States) (Israel) Isaac Rosefelt
- (United States) (Israel) Jerry Simon
- (Israel) Bar Timor
- (Israel) Igal Volodarsky
- (United States) (Israel) John Willis
- (United States) Jahmar Young
- (United States) (Israel) Tony Younger
- (Israel) Chaim Zlotikman
- (Israel) Arnon Palty
