= Israel at EuroBasket =

The Israel national basketball team has completed at 29 EuroBasket competitions since their tournament debut at EuroBasket 1953 in Moscow.

== Summary ==
EuroBasket					Qualification		
Year	Position	Pld	W	L	Pld	W	L
(Lithuania) 1939	Did not qualify						
(Switzerland) 1946	Did not qualify						
(Czechoslovakia) 1947	Did not qualify						
(Egypt) 1949	Did not qualify						
(France) 1951	Did not qualify						
(Soviet Union) 1953	5th	11	7	4			
(Hungary) 1955	Withdrew						
(Bulgaria) 1957	Withdrew						
(Turkey) 1959	11th	4	1	3			
(Socialist Federal Republic of Yugoslavia) 1961	11th	7	2	5			
(Poland) 1963	9th	9	4	5	Directly qualified		
(Soviet Union) 1965	6th	9	5	4	3	2	1
(Finland) 1967	8th	9	4	5	3	2	1
(Italy) 1969	11th	7	1	6	4	3	1
(West Germany) 1971	11th	7	1	6	3	2	1
(Spain) 1973	7th	7	3	4	11	10	1
(Socialist Federal Republic of Yugoslavia) 1975	7th	7	5	2	Directly qualified		
(Belgium) 1977	5th	7	4	3	Directly qualified		
(Italy) 1979	2nd place, silver medalist(s)	9	5	4	Directly qualified		
(Czechoslovakia) 1981	6th	8	3	5	Directly qualified		
(France) 1983	6th	7	3	4	Directly qualified		
(West Germany) 1985	9th	7	3	4	Directly qualified		
(Greece) 1987	11th	7	2	5	12	10	2
(Socialist Federal Republic of Yugoslavia) 1989	Did not qualify				3	2	1
(Italy) 1991	Did not qualify				10	5	5
(Germany) 1993	15th	3	1	2	6	4	2
(Greece) 1995	9th	6	2	4	6	5	1
(Spain) 1997	9th	8	4	4	10	6	4
(France) 1999	9th	6	2	4	10	7	3
(Turkey) 2001	10th	4	1	3	10	8	2
(Sweden) 2003	7th	7	3	4	10	5	5
(Serbia and Montenegro) 2005	9th	4	2	2	12	9	3
(Spain) 2007	11th	6	2	4	14	9	5
(Poland) 2009	15th	3	0	3	6	3	3
(Lithuania) 2011	13th	5	2	3	8	5	3
(Slovenia) 2013	21st	5	1	4	10	6	4
(France) (Croatia) (Germany) (Latvia) 2015	10th	6	3	3	6	4	2
(Finland) (Israel) (Romania) (Turkey) 2017	21st	5	1	4	Directly qualified		
(Czech Republic) (Georgia (country)) (Germany) (Italy) 2021	To be determined				To be determined		
Total	29/38	190	77	113	157	107	50

Note: Red border indicates host nation

== Competitions ==
=== 1953 EuroBasket ===
Israel competed in the EuroBasket 1953, the eighth FIBA EuroBasket, Israel's first time competing, and finished fifth.

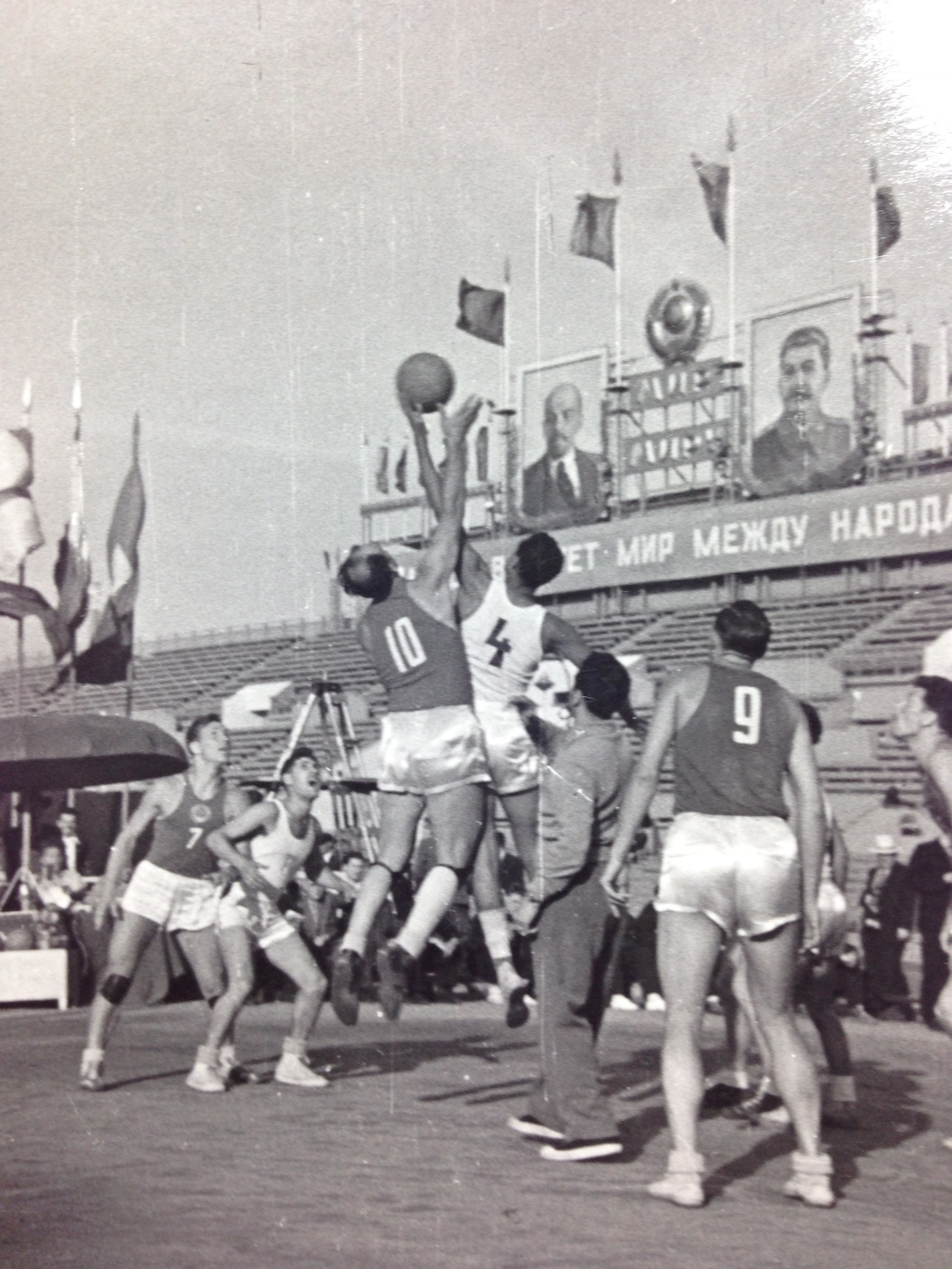
European Cup, Moscow 1953. Zacharia Ofri (#4, Israel) tipping off the ball

First round - Group D

Rank	Team	Pts	W	L	PF	PA	Diff
1.	Israel	7	3	1	178	141	+37
2.	Yugoslavia	7	3	1	218	170	+48
3.	Bulgaria	7	3	1	230	182	+48
4.	Finland	5	1	3	184	219	−35
5.	Lebanon	3	0	4	159	257	−98

Bulgaria	48 – 61	Israel
Israel	60 – 36	Finland
Yugoslavia	57 – 55	Israel
Israel	2 – 0 (w/o)	Lebanon

Note: Lebanon forfeited to Israel during their scheduled game.

Final round

Rank	Team	Pts	W	L	PF	PA	Diff
1.	Soviet Union	14	7	0	444	265	+179
2.	Hungary	11	4	3	375	282	+93
3.	France	11	4	3	391	374	+17
4.	Czechoslovakia	11	4	3	387	332	+55
5.	Israel	11	4	3	238	327	−89
6.	Yugoslavia	10	3	4	334	370	−36
7.	Italy	8	1	6	323	387	−64
8.	Egypt	7	1	6	271	426	−155

The final round was played as an 8-team round robin, with no further playoffs.

Israel	20 – 66	Hungary
Israel	25 – 75	Soviet Union
Israel	45 – 62	France
Israel	2 – 0 (w/o)	Egypt
Israel	59 – 53	Czechoslovakia
Israel	47 – 42	Italy
Israel	40 – 29	Yugoslavia

Note: Egypt forfeited to Israel during their scheduled game.

Roster

Coach: Jacob Saltiel

- Ralph Klein
- Avraham Schneor
- Zachariah Ofri
- Daniel Levy
- Menachem Korman
- Alfred Cohen
- David Heiblum
- Simon Schmukler
- Ernst Winer
- Marcel Hefez
- Mark Mimran
- Haim Boksenbaum
- Reuven Fecher

=== 1959 EuroBasket ===
Israel competed in the EuroBasket 1959, the eleventh FIBA EuroBasket, Israel's second time competing, and finished eleventh.

First round - Group C

Team	Pld	W	L	PF	PA	PD	Pts
Soviet Union	4	4	0	316	173	+143	8
France	4	3	1	252	228	+24	7
Italy	4	2	2	250	233	+17	6
Israel	4	1	3	145	216	−60	5
East Germany	4	0	4	133	224	−124	4

May 21
18:00

Italy	74–59	Israel
Scoring by half: 30–30, 44–29
Pts: Pieri (19)		Pts: Klein (14)

May 22
21:00

France	77–66	Israel
Scoring by half: 29–31, 48–35
Pts: Mayeur (18)		Pts: Klein (29)

May 23
10:00

Israel	79–67	East Germany
Scoring by half: 44–37, 35–30
Pts: Hemmo (23)		Pts: Kulik (18)

May 24
19:30

Soviet Union	90–44	Israel
Scoring by half: 44–25, 46–19
Pts: Botchkarev (17)		Pts: Kastan (12)

Classification round 1

Team	Pld	W	L	PF	PA	PD	Pts
Israel	2	2	0	124	98	+26	4
Finland	2	1	1	124	93	+31	3
Iran	2	0	2	137	118	−57	2

May 26
21:00

Israel	56–55	Finland
Scoring by half: 26–29, 30–26
Pts: Hemmo (15)		Pts: Lampen (17)

May 28
10:00

Israel	68–43	Iran
Scoring by half: 35–11, 33–32
Pts: Ben-Bassat (12)		Pts: Meshun (12)

Classification round 2 - Group 1 (9th–11th Place)

Team	Pld	W	L	PF	PA	PD	Pts
Yugoslavia	2	2	0	150	130	+20	4
Italy	2	1	1	151	134	+17	3
Israel	2	0	2	110	147	−37	2

May 30
11:30

Yugoslavia	72–54	Israel
Scoring by half: 28–29, 44–25
Pts: Korac (27)		Pts: Klein (19)

May 31
10:00

Italy	75–56	Israel
Scoring by half: 34–33, 41–23
Pts: Alesini (20)		Pts: Klein (19)

=== 1961 EuroBasket ===
Israel competed in the EuroBasket 1961, the twelfth FIBA EuroBasket, Israel's third time competing, and finished eleventh.

First round – Group D

Pos.	Team	Matches	Wins	Losses	Results	Points	Diff.
1	Bulgaria	2	2	0	118:89	4	+29
2	Israel	2	1	1	112:89	3	+23
3	West Germany	2	0	2	88:140	2	−52

Match	Team 1	Team 2	1.H.	2.H.	O.T	
D1	Israel	West Germany	29:18	41:23	–	70:41
D3	Bulgaria	Israel	21:27	27:15	–	48:42

Second round – Group 2

Pos.	Team	Matches	Wins	Losses	Results	Points	Diff.
1	France	5	4	1	341:286	9	+55
2	Bulgaria	5	4	1	291:281	9	+10
3	Romania	5	4	1	286:269	9	+17
4	Czechoslovakia	5	1	4	308:311	6	−3
5	Turkey	5	1	4	287:311	6	−24
6	Israel	5	1	4	233:288	6	−55

Match	Team 1	Team 2	1.H.	2.H.	O.T	
2/1	Israel	Czechoslovakia	30:27	21:37	–	51:64
2/3	Romania	Israel	32:25	30:17	–	62:42
2/6	France	Israel	25:14	39:27	–	64:41
2/11	Israel	Turkey	28:14	29:36	–	57:50

Final round

9–12 Place
60
East Germany	50
Turkey	63
62
Poland	74
Israel	59

Final round 9–12 Place
67
Turkey	59
Poland	74
11 – 12 Place
66
East Germany	80
Israel	83

=== 1963 EuroBasket ===
Israel competed in the EuroBasket 1963, the thirteenth FIBA EuroBasket, Israel's fourth time competing, and finished ninth.

First round – Group A

Pos.	Team	Matches	Wins	Losses	Results	Points	Diff.
1.	Yugoslavia	7	7	0	608:472	14	+136
2.	Hungary	7	5	2	499:455	10	+44
3.	Bulgaria	7	5	2	509:444	10	+65
4.	Belgium	7	4	3	520:512	8	+8
5.	Italy	7	4	3	467:459	8	+8
6.	Israel	7	2	5	463:505	4	−42
7.	Netherlands	7	1	6	453:588	2	−135
8.	Turkey	7	0	7	405:499	0	−94

Bulgaria	Israel	79–58
Yugoslavia	Israel	80–73
Israel	Turkey	64–55
Israel	Hungary	73–80
Israel	Netherlands	70–55
Italy	Israel	63–57
Belgium	Israel	93–68

Knockout stage – Places 9-12

1. Soviet Union
2. Poland
3. Yugoslavia
4. Hungary
5. Bulgaria
6. East Germany
7. Spain
8. Belgium
9. Israel
10. Czechoslovakia
11. Romania
12. Italy
13. France
14. Finland
15. Turkey
16. Netherlands

Israel defeated Romania in their first game of the 9th-12th place classification Round. They then went on to defeat Czechoslovakia in the 9th-10th place final, to finish in ninth place.

Team 1	Team 2	Result
Romania	Israel	47–57
Czechoslovakia	Israel	58–60

=== 1965 EuroBasket ===
Israel competed in the EuroBasket 1965, the fourteenth FIBA EuroBasket, Israel's fifth time competing, and finished sixth.

First round – Group A

Pos.	Team	Matches	Wins	Losses	Results	Points	Diff.
1.	Soviet Union	7	7	0	546:370	14	+176
2.	Italy	7	5	2	487:466	10	+21
3.	Czechoslovakia	7	5	2	522:443	10	+79
4.	Israel	7	4	3	395:439	8	−46
5.	Finland	7	3	4	394:458	6	−64
6.	East Germany	7	2	5	389:454	4	−65
7.	Romania	7	2	5	477:464	4	+13
8.	Hungary	7	0	7	364:478	0	−114

Hungary	Israel	49–60
Soviet Union	Israel	88–50
Israel	Romania	59–57
Israel	East Germany	56–55
Israel	Italy	47–68
Czechoslovakia	Israel	61–61 aet. 71–69
Finland	Israel	51–52

Knockout stage – Places 5-8

1. Soviet Union
2. Yugoslavia
3. Poland
4. Italy
5. Bulgaria
6. Israel
7. Czechoslovakia
8. Greece
9. France
10. East Germany
11. Spain
12. Finland
13. Romania
14. West Germany
15. Hungary
16. Sweden

Israel defeated against Greece in their first game in the Places 5-8 Round. They then went on and lost to Bulgaria in the fifth place game, finishing in sixth place.

Team 1	Team 2	Result
Greece	Israel	67–69
Bulgaria	Israel	63–51

=== 1967 EuroBasket ===
Israel competed in the EuroBasket 1967, the fifteenth FIBA EuroBasket, Israel's sixth time competing, and finished eighth.

First round – Group B

Pos.	Team	Matches	Wins	Losses	Results	Points	Diff.
1.	Soviet Union	7	7	0	640:431	14	+209
2.	Bulgaria	7	4	3	475:475	8	+2
3.	Italy	7	4	3	490:480	8	+10
4.	Israel	7	4	3	493:513	8	−20
5.	Greece	7	3	4	449:509	6	−60
6.	France	7	3	4	422:480	6	−58
7.	Hungary	7	2	5	418:464	4	−46
8.	East Germany	7	1	6	435:472	2	−37

Israel	Soviet Union	65–93
Israel	Hungary	60–56
Israel	Greece	75–75 aet. 91–81
Israel	Italy	67–70
Israel	East Germany	74–67
Israel	France	75–68
Bulgaria	Israel	78–61

Knockout stage – Places 5-8

1. Soviet Union
2. Czechoslovakia
3. Poland
4. Bulgaria
5. Romania
6. Finland
7. Italy
8. Israel
9. Yugoslavia
10. Spain
11. France
12. Greece
13. Hungary
14. East Germany
15. Belgium
16. Netherlands

Israel lost against Finland in their first game in the Places 5-8 Round. They then went on and lost to Italy in the seventh place game, finishing in eighth place.

Team 1	Team 2	Result
Finland	Israel	73–60
Italy	Israel	74–72

=== 1969 EuroBasket ===
Israel competed in the EuroBasket 1969, the sixteenth FIBA EuroBasket, Israel's seventh time competing, and finished eleventh.

First round – Group B

Pos.	Team	Matches	Wins	Losses	Results	Points	Diff.
1.	Czechoslovakia	5	5	0	397:334	10	+63
2.	Poland	5	3	2	349:380	6	−31
3.	Italy	5	3	2	334:299	6	+35
4.	Spain	5	2	3	359:385	4	−26
5.	Romania	5	2	3	365:361	4	+4
6.	Israel	5	0	5	381:426	0	−45

Israel	Poland	78–92
Czechoslovakia	Israel	90–82
Romania	Israel	75–74
Israel	Italy	66–79
Spain	Israel	90–81

Knockout stage – Places 9-12

Israel lost against Greece in their first game in the Places 9-12 Round. They then went on and defeated Sweden in the eleventh place game, finishing in eleventh place.

1. Soviet Union
2. Yugoslavia
3. Czechoslovakia
4. Poland
5. Spain
6. Italy
7. Bulgaria
8. Hungary
9. Romania
10. Greece
11. Israel
12. Sweden

Team 1	Team 2	Result
Greece	Israel	95–62
Sweden	Israel	83–92

=== 1971 EuroBasket ===
Israel competed in the EuroBasket 1971, the seventeenth FIBA EuroBasket, Israel's eighth time competing, and finished eleventh.

First round – Group B

Pos.	Team	Matches	Wins	Losses	Results	Points	Diff.
1.	Yugoslavia	5	5	0	434:358	10	+76
2.	Italy	5	4	1	374:329	8	+45
3.	Bulgaria	5	3	2	408:357	6	+51
4.	Czechoslovakia	5	2	3	401:394	4	+7
5.	Turkey	5	1	4	342:416	2	−74
6.	Israel	5	0	5	408:513	0	−105

Israel	Italy	68–87
Turkey	Israel	97–88
Israel	Bulgaria	75–98
Israel	Yugoslavia	92–118
Israel	Czechoslovakia	85–113

Knockout stage – Places 9-12

Israel lost against West Germany in their first game in the Places 9-12 Round. They then went on and defeated Turkey in the eleventh place game, finishing in eleventh place.

1. Soviet Union
2. Yugoslavia
3. Italy
4. Poland
5. Czechoslovakia
6. Bulgaria
7. Spain
8. Romania
9. West Germany
10. France
11. Israel
12. Turkey

Team 1	Team 2	Results
West Germany	Israel	99–76
Turkey	Israel	74–84

=== 1973 EuroBasket ===
Israel competed in the EuroBasket 1973, the eighteenth FIBA EuroBasket, Israel's ninth time competing, and finished seventh.

First round – Group A

Pos.	Team	Matches	Wins	Losses	Results	Points	Diff.
1.	Soviet Union	5	5	0	439:353	10	+86
2.	Czechoslovakia	5	4	1	364:350	8	+14
3.	Turkey	5	2	3	345:386	4	−41
4.	Israel	5	2	3	443:451	4	−8
5.	Poland	5	1	4	376:408	2	−32
6.	Romania	5	1	4	369:388	2	−19

Czechoslovakia	Israel	92–89
Israel	Romania	85–80
Israel	Poland	98–84
Soviet Union	Israel	101–78
Turkey	Israel	94–93

Knockout stage – Places 5-8

Israel lost against Italy in their first game in the Places 5-8 Round. They then went on and defeated Turkey in the seventh place game, finishing in seventh place.

1. Yugoslavia
2. Spain
3. Soviet Union
4. Czechoslovakia
5. Italy
6. Bulgaria
7. Israel
8. Turkey
9. Romania
10. France
11. Greece
12. Poland

Classification round
Turkey	67
Bulgaria	76
Italy	94
Israel	73

Fifth place
Bulgaria	78
Italy	96
Seventh place
Turkey	78
Israel	96

=== 1975 EuroBasket ===
Israel competed in the EuroBasket 1975, the nineteenth FIBA EuroBasket, Israel's tenth time competing, and finished seventh.

First round – Group B

Pos.	Team	Matches	Wins	Losses	Results	Points	Diff.
1.	Soviet Union	3	3	0	255:224	6	+31
2.	Czechoslovakia	3	2	1	261:252	4	+9
3.	Israel	3	1	2	246:255	2	−9
4.	Poland	3	0	3	232:263	0	−31

Czechoslovakia	Israel	86–85
Israel	Poland	90–84
Soviet Union	Israel	85–71

Knockout stage – Places 7-12

Israel went undefeated in the 7-12 knockout round, finishing in seventh place.

Pos.	Team	Matches	Wins	Losses	Results	Points	Diff.
7.	Israel	5	5	0	388:338	10	+50
8.	Poland	5	4	1	332:297	6	+35
9.	Turkey	5	3	2	308:332	6	−24
10.	Netherlands	5	2	3	292:306	4	−14
11.	Romania	5	1	4	337:367	2	−30
12.	Greece	5	1	4	284:301	2	−17

Netherlands	Israel	80–81
Turkey	Israel	77–101
Israel	Greece	87–76
Israel	Romania	119–105

=== 1977 EuroBasket ===
Israel competed in the EuroBasket 1977, the twentieth FIBA EuroBasket, Israel's eleventh time competing, and finished fifth.

First round – Group A

Team	Pld	W	L	PF	PA	PD	Pts
Italy	5	5	0	428	370	+58	10
Soviet Union	5	4	1	523	395	+128	9
Bulgaria	5	3	2	444	464	−20	8
Israel	5	2	3	427	438	−11	7
France	5	1	4	377	449	−72	6
Austria	5	0	5	384	467	−83	5

Bulgaria	Israel	88–86
Italy	Israel	78–73
Israel	Soviet Union	69–103
Austria	Israel	87–103
Israel	France	96–82

Knockout stage – Places 5-8

Israel defeated both Belgium and Bulgaria in the Places 5-8 Round, finishing in fifth place.

1. Yugoslavia
2. Soviet Union
3. Czechoslovakia
4. Italy
5. Israel
6. Bulgaria
7. Netherlands
8. Belgium
9. Spain
10. Finland
11. France
12. Austria

Classification round
Bulgaria	108
Netherlands	85
Belgium	74
Israel	81

Fifth place
Bulgaria	78
Israel	88
Seventh place
Netherlands	104
Belgium	89

=== 1979 EuroBasket ===
Israel competed in the EuroBasket 1979, the 21st FIBA EuroBasket, Israel's twelfth time competing, and finished second.

This marked Israel's first metal at the EuroBasket, with winning the silver. In addition, an Israeli competitor won the MVP award for the first time, won by Miki Berkovich.

First round – Group C

Team	Pld	W	L	PF	PA	PD	Pts
Israel	3	2	1	246	246	0	5
Yugoslavia	3	2	1	258	237	+21	5
Poland	3	1	2	258	264	−6	4
France	3	1	2	233	248	−15	4

France	92 – 83	Israel
Israel	86 – 78	Poland
Yugoslavia	76 – 77	Israel	11 June 1979

Final round

The Teams that finish their Preliminary round Groups in the 1st and 2nd places advanced to the Final Round. The first and second in this group will go to the finals.

Israel	94 – 93	Czechoslovakia
Israel	78 – 90	Italy
Spain	84 – 88	Israel
Israel	71 – 92	Soviet Union
Israel	77 – 76	Yugoslavia

19 June 1979
Soviet Union 98
Israel 76

Roster

Coach: Ralph Klein

- Mickey Berkowitz
- Lou Silver
- Motti Aroesti
- Yehoshua "Shuki" Schwartz
- Eric Menkin
- Steve Kaplan
- Boaz Yanai
- Avigdor Moskowitz
- Barry Leibowitz (c)
- Pinhas Hozez
- Uri Ben-Ari (basketballer)
- Shai Sharf

=== 1981 EuroBasket ===
Israel competed in the EuroBasket 1981, the 22nd FIBA EuroBasket, Israel's thirteenth time competing, and finished sixth.

First round – Group A

Team	Pld	W	L	PF	PA	PD	Pts
Spain	5	5	0	452	362	+90	10
Czechoslovakia	5	4	1	393	358	+35	9
Israel	5	3	2	418	396	+22	8
France	5	2	3	402	409	−7	7
England	5	1	4	313	371	−58	6
Greece	5	0	5	356	438	−82	5

Israel	82 – 74	England
Spain	89 – 81	Israel
France	76 – 88	Israel
Greece	71 – 82	Israel
Israel	85 – 86	Czechoslovakia

Knockout stage – Places 1-6

Pos	Team	Pld	W	L	PF	PA	PD	Pts
1	Soviet Union	5	5	0	537	424	+113	10
2	Yugoslavia	5	4	1	479	441	+38	9
3	Spain	5	3	2	421	441	−20	8
4	Czechoslovakia	5	2	3	425	445	−20	7
5	Italy	5	1	4	440	481	−41	6
6	Israel	5	1	4	435	505	−70	6

Israel	Yugoslavia	87–102
Israel	Italy	98–116
Soviet Union	Israel	112–84

=== 1983 EuroBasket ===
Israel competed in the EuroBasket 1983, the 23rd FIBA EuroBasket, Israel's fourteenth time competing, and finished sixth. Israel qualified for the tournament automatically by finishing in the top eight during the EuroBasket 1981.

In addition Israeli referee David Dagan worked Group A game against Italy and Sweden as well as semi-finals game Italy vs Netherlands.

First round – Group B

Team	Pld	W	L	PF	PA	PD	Pts
Soviet Union	5	5	0	482	375	+107	10
Netherlands	5	3	2	356	403	−47	8
West Germany	5	3	2	384	395	−11	8
Israel	5	2	3	386	398	−12	7
Poland	5	1	4	357	382	−25	6
Czechoslovakia	5	1	4	405	417	−12	6

26 May
14:30

Boxscore

Israel	72–78	Netherlands
Scoring by half: 31–43, 41–35
Pts: Berkowitz 24		Pts: Cramer 16

Palais de Sports, Caen
Referees: Giancarlo Vitolo (ITA), Zdravko Kurilić (YUG)

27 May
20:30

Boxscore

Soviet Union	92–87	Israel
Scoring by half: 43–46, 49–41
Pts: Myškin 18		Pts: Berkowitz 32

Palais de Sports, Caen

28 May
14:30

Boxscore

Poland	62–64	Israel
Scoring by half: 32–38, 30–26
Pts: Binkowski 20		Pts: Jamchi, Berkowitz 16

Palais de Sports, Caen

29 May
20:30

Boxscore

Czechoslovakia	89–93 (OT)	Israel
Scoring by half: 41–45, 40–36 Overtime: 8–12
Pts: PRajniak 25		Pts: Jamchi 27

Palais de Sports, Caen

30 May
20:30

Boxscore

West Germany	77–70	Israel
Scoring by half: 42–42, 35–28
Pts: Schrempf 16		Pts: Jamchi 20

Palais de Sports, Caen

Knockout stage – Places 5-8

Rank	Team	Record
1st place, gold medalist(s)	Italy	7–0
2nd place, silver medalist(s)	Spain	5–2
3rd place, bronze medalist(s)	Soviet Union	6–1
4	Netherlands	3–4
5	France	4–3
6	Israel	3–4
7	Yugoslavia	4–3
8	West Germany	3–4
9	Poland	3–4
10	Czechoslovakia	2–5
11	Greece	2–5
12	Sweden	0–7

Classification round
1 June – 18:00
Yugoslavia	88
Israel	99
2 June – 18:00
West Germany	82
France	90

Fifth place
4 June – 15:30
Israel	88
France	92
Seventh place
3 June – 18:00
Yugoslavia	104
West Germany	88

1 June
18:00

Boxscore

Israel	99–88	Yugoslavia
Scoring by half: 48–46, 51–42
Pts: Silver 27		Pts: Radovanović 26

Palais des Sports de Beaulieu, Nantes
Referees: Pedro Hernández Cabrera (ESP)

4 June
18:00

Boxscore

France	92–88	Israel
Scoring by half: 42–41, 50–47
Pts: Szanyiel 23		Pts: Jamchi 22

Palais des Sports de Beaulieu, Nantes
Referees: Giancarlo Vitolo (ITA), Pedro Hernández Cabrera (ESP)

Roster

Israel men's national basketball team roster
Players
Coaches

Pos.	No.	Name	Age – Date of birth	Height	Club
F/C	4	Howard Lassoff	27 – 15 October 1955	2.08 m (6 ft 10 in)	Maccabi Tel Aviv	(Israel)
PG	5	Israel Elimelech	22 – 22 June 1960
PF	6	Louis Silver	29 – 27 November 1953
PG	7	Motti Aroesti	–
C	8	Steve Schlachtern	–
F	9	Miki Berkovich	29 – 17 February 1954	1.92 m (6 ft 4 in)	Maccabi Tel Aviv	(Israel)
C	10	Chaim Zlotikman	26 – 17 March 1957
PG	11	Shmuel Zisman	–
G/F	12	Doron Jamchi	21 – 1 July 1961	1.98 m (6 ft 6 in)	Ironi Ramat Gan	(Israel)
C	13	Ofer Yaakobi	–
	14	Niv Bogin	22 – 29 July 1960
C	15	Johan Willis	30 – 23 September 1952

Head coach

- Ralph Klein

Legend

- Club – describes last
  club before the tournament
- Age – describes age
  on 26 May 1983

=== 1985 EuroBasket ===
Israel competed in the EuroBasket 1985, the 24th FIBA EuroBasket, Israel's fifteenth time competing, and finished ninth. Israel qualified for the tournament automatically by finishing in the top eight during the EuroBasket 1983.

Israeli competitor Doron Jamchi lead all scorers with an average of 28.1 points per game. Israeli referee Todd Warnick worked several games. He worked the Group A games Poland vs Romania, France vs Yugoslavia, and France vs Poland. He additionally worked the quarterfinals game Yugoslavia vs Czechoslovakia, and third place game Spain vs Italy.

First round – Group B

Team	Pld	W	L	PF	PA	PD	Pts
Italy	5	4	1	459	391	+68	9
West Germany	5	4	1	445	420	+25	9
Bulgaria	5	3	2	396	385	+11	8
Czechoslovakia	5	2	3	428	425	+3	7
Israel	5	2	3	430	434	−4	7
Netherlands	5	1	4	397	503	−106	6

5 June
20:30

Boxscore

Israel	72–78	Bulgaria
Scoring by half: 44–37, 28–41
Pts: Jamchi 27		Pts: Evtimov 26

Wilhelm-Dopatka Halle, Leverkusen
Attendance: 3,100
Referees: José Manuel Reynoso (USA), Yvan Mainini (FRA)

6 June
18:15

Boxscore

Israel	92–93	Czechoslovakia
Scoring by half: 54–42, 38–51
Pts: Jamchi 33		Pts: Kropilák 23

Wilhelm-Dopatka Halle, Leverkusen
Attendance: 3,600
Referees: Zoran Grbac (YUG), Ion Antonescu (ROU)

7 June
20:30

Boxscore

Israel	80–86	Netherlands
Scoring by half: 49–45, 31–41
Pts: Jamchi 19		Pts: Kuipers 22

Wilhelm-Dopatka Halle, Leverkusen
Attendance: 2,460
Referees: Yvan Mainin (FRA), Zoran Grbac (YUG)

8 June
18:15

Boxscore

Israel	94–88	West Germany
Scoring by half: 46–52, 48–36
Pts: Jamchi 42		Pts: Schrempf 36

Wilhelm-Dopatka Halle, Leverkusen
Attendance: 4,002
Referees: Georgy Avalishvili (URS), Francisco Fajardo (ESP)

9 June
19:30

Boxscore

Israel	92–89 (OT)	Italy
Scoring by half: 46–38, 33–41 Overtime: 13–10
Pts: Berkovich 34		Pts: Magnifico 23

Wilhelm-Dopatka Halle, Leverkusen
Attendance: 3,690
Referees: José Manuel Reynoso (USA), Ion Antonescu (ROU)

Knockout stage – Places 9-12

Rank	Team	Record
1st place, gold medalist(s)	Soviet Union	7–1
2nd place, silver medalist(s)	Czechoslovakia	4–4
3rd place, bronze medalist(s)	Italy	6–2
4	Spain	5–3
5	West Germany	5–3
6	France	2–6
7	Yugoslavia	5–3
8	Bulgaria	3–5
9	Israel	4–3
10	Romania	2–5
11	Poland	2–5
12	Netherlands	1–6

Classification round
11 June – 15:30
Poland	86
Israel	91
12 June – 15:30
Romania	90
Netherlands	87

Ninth place
14 June – 15:30
Israel	90
Romania	89
Eleventh place
13 June – 15:30
Poland	102
Netherlands	100

11 June
15:30

Boxscore

Poland	86–91	Israel
Scoring by half: 45–40, 41–51
Pts: Zelig 25		Pts: Jamchi 29

Hanns-Martin-Schleyer-Halle, Stuttgart
Attendance: 2,500
Referees: Francisco Fajardo (ESP), Zoran Grbac (YUG)

14 June
15:30

Boxscore

Israel	90–89	Romania
Scoring by half: 47–47, 43–42
Pts: Jamchi 39		Pts: Ermurache 21

Hanns-Martin-Schleyer-Halle, Stuttgart
Referees: Maurizio Martolini (ITA), Georgy Labov (BUL)

Roster

Israel men's national basketball team roster
Players
Coaches

Pos.	No.	Name	Age – Date of birth	Height	Club
	4	Amir Bino	23 – 8 August 1961
F	5	Mordechai Daniel	21 – 24 July 1963
C	6	Ofer Yaakobi	–
PG	7	Motti Aroesti	–
C	8	Steve Schlachter	–
F	9	Miki Berkovich	31 – 17 February 1954	1.92 m (6 ft 4 in)	Maccabi Tel Aviv B.C.	(Israel)
C	10	Chaim Zlotikman	28 – 17 March 1957
PG	11	Shmuel Zisman	–
F	12	Doron Jamchi	23 – 1 July 1961	1.98 m (6 ft 6 in)	Ironi Ramat Gan	(Israel)
PG	13	Hen Lippin	19 – 4 November 1965	1.84 m (6 ft 0 in)	Maccabi Tel Aviv B.C.	(Israel)
F	14	Pinhas Hozez	27 – 8 September 1957
C	15	Johan Willis	32 – 23 September 1952

Head coach

- Zvi Sherf

Legend

- Club – describes last
  club before the tournament
- Age – describes age
  on 5 June 1985

=== 1987 EuroBasket ===
Israel competed in the EuroBasket 1987, the 25th FIBA EuroBasket, Israel's sixteenth time competing, and finished eleventh. Israel qualified for the tournament during the qualification stage.

Israeli referee Todd Warnick also worked several games during the tournament. He was a referee for Group A games: Yugoslavia vs Soviet Union, Greece vs Spain, and France vs Romania. He also was a referee during the Quarterfinals game Soviet Union vs Czechoslovakia, and Semifinals game Greece vs Yugoslavia.

First round – Group B

Team	Pld	W	L	PF	PA	PD	Pts
Italy	5	5	0	467	379	+88	10
West Germany	5	3	2	428	447	−19	8
Poland	5	3	2	332	434	−102	8
Czechoslovakia	5	2	3	436	437	−1	7
Netherlands	5	1	4	380	430	−50	6
Israel	5	1	4	422	438	−16	6

3 June
10:00

Boxscore

Israel	99–83	Czechoslovakia
Scoring by half: 44–40, 55–43
Pts: Jamchi 37		Pts: Kropilák 20

Peace and Friendship Stadium, Athens
Attendance: 1,000
Referees: Yvan Mainini (FRA), Philippe Leemann (SUI)

4 June
10:00

Boxscore

Israel	60–61	Netherlands
Scoring by half: 24–43, 36–18
Pts: Jamchi 36		Pts: Smits 20

Peace and Friendship Stadium, Athens
Referees: Kostas Rigas (GRE), George Chiraleu (ROU)

5 June
14:00

Boxscore

Israel	107–112 (OT)	West Germany
Scoring by half: 40–49, 58–49 Overtime: 9–14
Pts: Bird-Curtis 28		Pts: Jackel 40

Peace and Friendship Stadium, Athens
Referees: Radoslav Petrović (YUG), Vicente Sanchís (ESP)

6 June
20:00

Boxscore

Israel	79–99	Italy
Scoring by half: 41–56, 38–43
Pts: Jamchi 34		Pts: Riva 20

Peace and Friendship Stadium, Athens
Referees: Stavros Douvis (GRE), Philippe Leemann (SUI)

7 June
15:00

Boxscore

Israel	77–83	Poland
Scoring by half: 45–43, 32–40
Pts: Jamchi 24		Pts: Zelig 31

Peace and Friendship Stadium, Athens
Referees: Alan Richardson (ENG), Vicente Sanchís (ESP)

Knockout stage – Places 9-12

Rank	Team	Record
1st place, gold medalist(s)	Greece	6–2
2nd place, silver medalist(s)	Soviet Union	7–1
3rd place, bronze medalist(s)	Yugoslavia	5–3
4	Spain	4–4
5	Italy	7–1
6	West Germany	4–4
7	Poland	4–4
8	Czechoslovakia	2–6
9	France	3–4
10	Netherlands	2–5
11	Israel	2–5
12	Romania	0–7

Classification round
9 June – 17:30
France	96
Israel	93
10 June – 17:30
Romania	87
Netherlands	88

Ninth place
13 June – 17:30
France	94
Netherlands	80
Eleventh place
11 June – 17:30
Israel	97
Romania	87

9 June
17:30

Boxscore

France	96–93	Israel
Scoring by half: 44–50, 52–43
Pts: Dubuisson 36		Pts: Bird Curtis 34

Peace and Friendship Stadium, Athens
Referees: Costas Rigas (GRE), George Chiraleu (ROU)

11 June
17:30

Boxscore

Israel	97–87	Romania
Scoring by half: 49–43, 48–44
Pts: Jamchi 44		Pts: Niculescu 20

Peace and Friendship Stadium, Athens
Referees: Maurizio Martolini (ITA), Peter George (FRG)

Roster

Israel men's national basketball team roster
Players
Coaches

Pos.	No.	Name	Age – Date of birth	Height	Club
C	4	Howard Lassoff	31 – 15 October 1955	2.08 m (6 ft 10 in)	Maccabi Tel Aviv B.C.	(Israel)
F	5	Mordechai Daniel	23 – 24 July 1963
PG	6	Adi Gordon	21 – 4 March 1966	1.80 m (5 ft 11 in)	Maccabi Haifa B.C.	(Israel)
F	7	Nadav Henefeld	18 – 19 June 1968	2.02 m (6 ft 8 in)	A.S. Ramat HaSharon	(Israel)
C	8	Ofer Fleisher	21 – 14 March 1966
PG	9	Ariel Rosenberg	18 – 19 June 1968
PG	10	Hen Lippin	21 – 4 November 1965	1.84 m (6 ft 0 in)	Maccabi Tel Aviv B.C.	(Israel)
F	11	Doron Shefa	25 – 13 October 1961	1.96 m (6 ft 5 in)	Maccabi Haifa B.C.	(Israel)
F	12	Doron Jamchi	25 – 1 July 1961	1.98 m (6 ft 6 in)	Maccabi Tel Aviv B.C.	(Israel)
C	13	LaVon Mercer	28 – 13 January 1959	2.08 m (6 ft 10 in)	Maccabi Tel Aviv B.C.	(Israel)
C	14	Tomer Steinhauer	20 – 3 October 1966	2.07 m (6 ft 9 in)	Maccabi Haifa B.C.	(Israel)
C	15	Itzhak Cohen	18 – 10 August 1968

Head coach

- Zvi Sherf

Legend

- Club – describes last
  club before the tournament
- Age – describes age
  on 3 June 1987

=== 1993 EuroBasket ===
Israel competed in the EuroBasket 1993, the 28th FIBA EuroBasket, Israel's seventeenth time competing, and finished thirteenth. Israel qualified for the tournament after having not competed in the previous two.

Additionally, Israeli referee Reuven Virovnik worked Group B game France vs Turkey, Group D games Belgium vs Germany, and Slovenia vs Germany, and Group F games Estonia vs Turkey, Estonia vs France, and Germany vs Turkey. In addition to working Place 5-8 Round Estonia vs Spain, and Bosnia and Herzegovina vs France. He also worked Quarterfinals games Croatia vs Bosnia, and Herzegovina and Semifinals game Greece vs Germany.

First round – Group C

Team	Pld	W	L	PF	PA	PD	Pts
Greece	3	2	1	243	214	+29	5
Latvia	3	2	1	243	244	−1	5
Italy	3	1	2	244	251	−7	4
Israel	3	1	2	243	267	−24	4

22 June
21:00

Boxscore

Italy	92–83	Israel
Scoring by half: 40–23, 52–60
Pts: Rusconi 22		Pts: Jamchi 19

Europahalle, Karlsruhe
Referees: Wieslaw Zych (POL), Carl Jungenbrand (FIN)

23 June
19:00

Boxscore

Israel	79–74	Greece
Scoring by half: 40–41, 39–33
Pts: Gordon 35		Pts: Giannakis 32

Europahalle, Karlsruhe
Attendance: 2,500
Referees: Iztok Rems (SLO), Peter George (GER)

24 June
19:00

Boxscore

Latvia	101–84	Israel
Scoring by half: 50–35, 51–49
Pts: Jaunzems 21		Pts: Henefeld 16

Europahalle, Karlsruhe
Attendance: 3,500
Referees: Peter George (GER), Carl Jungenbrand (FIN)

Roster

Israel men's national basketball team roster
Players
Coaches

Pos.	No.	Name	Age – Date of birth	Height	Club
F	4	Nadav Henefeld	25 – 19 June 1968	2.02 m (6 ft 8 in)	Maccabi Tel Aviv B.C.	(Israel)
C	5	Ofer Fleisher	27 – 14 March 1966
F	6	Israel Elimelech	33 – 22 June 1960
C	7	Desi Barmore	33 – 22 May 1960
C	8	Shimon Amsalem	26 – 10 November 1966
PG	9	Adi Gordon	27 – 4 March 1966	1.80 m (5 ft 11 in)	Hapoel Jerusalem B.C.	(Israel)
C	10	Tomer Steinhauer	26 – 3 October 1966	2.07 m (6 ft 9 in)	Hapoel Tel Aviv B.C.	(Israel)
G	11	Doron Sheffer	21 – 12 March 1972	1.95 m (6 ft 5 in)	Hapoel Galil Elyon	(Israel)
F	12	Doron Jamchi	31 – 1 July 1961	1.98 m (6 ft 6 in)	Maccabi Tel Aviv B.C.	(Israel)
F	13	Amir Katz	22 – 15 July 1970
G	14	Lior Arditty	25 – 16 December 1967	1.92 m (6 ft 4 in)
F	15	Motti Daniel	29 – 24 July 1963

Head coach

- Zvi Sherf

Legend

- Club – describes last
  club before the tournament
- Age – describes age
  on 22 June 1993

=== 1995 EuroBasket ===
Israel competed in the EuroBasket 1995, the 29th FIBA EuroBasket, Israel's eighteenth time competing, and finished ninth.

Additionally, Israeli referee Reuven Virovnik worked several games during the tournament. He was the referee for the Group A game Yugoslavia vs Germany, Group B games Slovenia vs France, Finland vs Spain, Russia vs Croatia, France vs Turkey, and Slovenia vs Turkey.

First round – Group A

Team	Pld	W	L	PF	PA	PD	Pts
FR Yugoslavia	6	6	0	490	411	+79	12
Lithuania	6	5	1	513	442	+71	11
Greece	6	4	2	448	430	+18	10
Italy	6	3	3	438	433	+5	9
Israel	6	2	4	419	417	+2	8
Germany	6	1	5	448	488	−40	7
Sweden	6	0	6	393	528	−135	6

21 June
17:30

Boxscore

Israel	71–73	Italy
Scoring by half: 39–37, 32–36
Pts: Henefeld 16; Rebs: Henefeld 7 Asts: Goodes 4		Pts: Rusconi 17; Rebs: Rusconi 10; Asts: Pittis, Rusconi 3

O.A.C.A. Olympic Indoor Hall, Athens
Referees: Carl Jungebrand (FIN), Necip Kapanlı (TUR)

22 June
22:00

Boxscore

Sweden	62–87	Israel
Scoring by half: 34–42, 28–45
Pts: Sahlström 15; Rebs: Sahlström 9 Asts: Evers 4		Pts: Jamchi 22; Rebs: Fleisher, Sheffer 5 Asts: Goodes 6

O.A.C.A. Olympic Indoor Hall, Athens
Referees: Wiesław Zych (POL), Aleš Kamnikar (SLO)

24 June
13:30

Boxscore

Israel	78–60	Germany
Scoring by half: 40–20, 38–40
Pts: Jamchi 20; Rebs: Fleisher 10; Asts: Sheffer 6		Pts: Koch 22; Rebs: Welp 7 Asts: Nürnberger 6

O.A.C.A. Olympic Indoor Hall, Athens
Referees: Alan Richardson (ENG), Aleš Kamnikar (SLO)

26 June
20:00

Boxscore

Greece	69–59	Israel
Scoring by half: 29–25, 30–24
Pts: Sigalas 20; Rebs: Fasoulas 8 Asts: Sigalas 4		Pts: Jamchi 17; Rebs: Henefeld 13; Asts: Sheffer 3

O.A.C.A. Olympic Indoor Hall, Athens
Referees: Alan Richardson (ENG), Carl Jungebrand (FIN)

27 June
13:30

Boxscore

Israel	59–72	FR Yugoslavia
Scoring by half: 25–35, 34–37
Pts: Goodes 13; Rebs: Goodes 5 Asts: Sheffer 3		Pts: Danilović 21; Rebs: Bodiroga 8 Asts: Paspalj 3

O.A.C.A. Olympic Indoor Hall, Athens
Referees: George Toliver (USA), Necip Kapanlı (TUR)

28 June
20:00

Boxscore

Lithuania	91–75	Israel
Scoring by half: 45–29, 46–46
Pts: Karnišovas 24; Rebs: Karnišovas 13; Asts: Marčiulionis, Štombergas 5		Pts: Sheffer 16; Rebs: Balul, Henefeld 5 Asts: Goodes 6

O.A.C.A. Olympic Indoor Hall, Athens
Referees: Vicente Sanchís (ESP), Philippe Mailhabiau (FRA)

Tournament highs

Two Israelis finished in the top ten for assists. Guy Goodes finished fourth with an average of 3.7 per game, and Doron Sheffer finished seventh with 3.3. Three Israelis finished in the top ten in steals. Nadav Henefeld finished first averaging 2.7 steals per game, Doron Sheffer had 2.2 and Mordechai Daniel had 1.8. Israel also finished first as a team, averaging 11.5 steals per game. Israeli Nadav Henefeld finished third in average minutes played, with 34.2 minutes per game.

Roster

Israel men's national basketball team roster
Players
Coaches

Pos.	No.	Name	Age – Date of birth	Height	Club
F	4	Nadav Henefeld	27 – 19 June 1968	2.02 m (6 ft 8 in)	Maccabi Tel Aviv B.C.	(Israel)
C	5	Ofer Fleisher	29 – 14 March 1966
PG	6	Guy Goodes	24 – 13 March 1971	1.90 m (6 ft 3 in)	Maccabi Tel Aviv B.C.	(Israel)
G	7	Bradley Leaf	35 – 17 May 1960
PF	8	Dror Cohen	21 – 17 January 1974	2.02 m (6 ft 8 in)	Maccabi Jerusalem B.C.	(Israel)
PG	9	Adi Gordon	29 – 4 March 1966	1.80 m (5 ft 11 in)	Hapoel Holon	(Israel)
C	10	Amir Muchtari	23 – 12 June 1972	2.08 m (6 ft 10 in)	Hapoel Galil Elyon	(Israel)
G	11	Doron Sheffer	23 – 12 March 1972	1.95 m (6 ft 5 in)	University of Connecticut	(United States)
F	12	Doron Jamchi	33 – 1 July 1961	1.98 m (6 ft 6 in)	Maccabi Tel Aviv B.C.	(Israel)
PF	13	Kobi Balul	22 – 5 February 1973
G	14	Lior Arditty	27 – 16 December 1967	1.92 m (6 ft 4 in)
F	15	Motti Daniel	31 – 24 July 1963

Head coach

- Zvi Sherf

Legend

- Club – describes last
  club before the tournament
- Age – describes age
  on 21 June 1995

=== 1997 EuroBasket ===
Israel competed in the EuroBasket 1997, the 30th FIBA EuroBasket, Israel's nineteenth time competing, and finished ninth. Israeli referee Reuven Virovnik also worked several games in the tournament. He was the referee for First Round Group C game Italy vs Yugoslavia, Group D games Croatia vs Germany, and Spain vs Germany. He also worked Second Round Group F games, Poland vs Croatia, and Yugoslavia vs Spain. He also worked the third place game Greece vs Russia, classification round Poland vs Lithuania, and Bosnia and Herzegovina vs Latvia.

First round – Group B

Team	Pld	W	L	PF	PA	PD	Pts
Lithuania	3	3	0	245	215	+30	6
Israel	3	2	1	217	225	−8	5
France	3	1	2	250	257	−7	4
Slovenia	3	0	3	210	225	−15	3

25 June
22:30

Boxscore

Lithuania	75–60	Israel
Scoring by half: 30–31, 45–29
Pts: Einikis, Karnišovas 17; Rebs: Karnišovas 9 Asts: Karnišovas 6		Pts: Kattash 25; Rebs: Steinhauer 7 Asts: Kattash 3

Palau Girona-Fontajau, Girona
Attendance: 1,500
Referees: Danko Radić (CRO), Tomislav Jovančić (YUG)

26 June
22:30

Boxscore

Israel	69–68	Slovenia
Scoring by half: 36–40, 33–28
Pts: Steinhauer 22; Rebs: Henefeld 6 Asts: Kattash 4		Pts: Alibegović 18; Rebs: Nesterovič 13; Asts: 3 Players 3

Palau Girona-Fontajau, Girona
Attendance: 2,000
Referees: Víctor Mas (ESP), Agnis Perkons (LAT)

27 June
20:30

Boxscore

France	82–88	Israel
Scoring by half: 42–42, 40–46
Pts: Bonato 21; Rebs: Dubos 6 Asts: Sciarra 5		Pts: Kattash 34; Rebs: Steinhauer 6 Asts: Kattash 4

Palau Girona-Fontajau, Girona
Attendance: 2,000
Referees: Vilim Koller (SVK), Volodymyr Drabikovskyi (UKR)

Second round – Group E

Team	Pld	W	L	PF	PA	PD	Pts
Greece	5	5	0	386	343	+43	10
Russia	5	4	1	432	343	+89	9
Lithuania	5	3	2	392	399	−7	8
Turkey	5	2	3	356	396	−40	7
Israel	5	1	4	370	410	−40	6
France	5	0	5	392	437	−45	5

29 June
18:00

Boxscore

Turkey	81–71	Israel
Scoring by half: 26–35, 55–36
Pts: Ene 19; Rebs: Türkcan 7 Asts: Ene 5		Pts: Steinhauer 23; Rebs: Steinhauer 8 Asts: Henefeld 5

Palau Girona-Fontajau, Girona
Attendance: 3,000
Referees: Danko Radić (CRO), Tomislav Jovančić (YUG)

30 June
18:00

Boxscore

Israel	69–87	Russia
Scoring by half: 31–43, 38–44
Pts: Kattash, Shelef 14; Rebs: Steinhauer 6 Asts: Henefeld 3		Pts: Fetisov 16; Rebs: Mikhaylov 7 Asts: Babkov 3

Palau Girona-Fontajau, Girona
Attendance: 3,000
Referees: Víctor Mas (ESP), Gennaro Colucci (ITA)

1 July
18:00

Boxscore

Greece	85–82	Israel
Scoring by half: 44–48, 41–34
Pts: Oikonomou 20; Rebs: Rentzias 6 Asts: Oikonomou 3		Pts: Kattash 29; Rebs: Sheffer 6 Asts: Sheffer 5

Palau Girona-Fontajau, Girona
Attendance: 3,000
Referees: Krzysztof Koralewski (POL), Almir Akšamija (BIH)

Knockout round – Place 9-12

Qualified for the 1998 FIBA World Championship
Qualified for the 1998 FIBA World Championship as host

Rank	Team	Record
1st place, gold medalist(s)	FR Yugoslavia	8–1
2nd place, silver medalist(s)	Italy	8–1
3rd place, bronze medalist(s)	Russia	7–2
4	Greece	7–2
5	Spain	6–3
6	Lithuania	5–4
7	Poland	4–5
8	Turkey	3–6
9	Israel	4–4
10	France	2–6
11	Croatia	2–6
12	Germany	1–7
13	Ukraine	3–2
14	Slovenia	1–4
15	Bosnia and Herzegovina	1–4
16	Latvia	0–5

Classification round
4 July – 10:00
Israel	84
Germany	75
4 July – 12:00
France	84
Croatia	79

Ninth place
5 July – 12:00
Israel	91
France	84
Eleventh place
5 July – 10:00
Germany	93
Croatia	100

4 July
10:00

Boxscore

Israel	84–75	Germany
Scoring by half: 39–41, 45–34
Pts: Kattash 25; Rebs: Kattash 7 Asts: Kattash 5		Pts: Rödl, Wucherer 18; Rebs: Femerling 9 Asts: Harnisch 4

Palau Sant Jordi, Barcelona
Attendance: 1,500
Referees: Gennaro Colucci (ITA), Aleksander Gorshkov (RUS)

5 July
12:00

Boxscore

Israel	91–84	France
Scoring by half: 43–48, 48–36
Pts: Kattash 27; Rebs: Steinhauer 12; Asts: Kattash, Steinhauer 4		Pts: Risacher 23; Rebs: Dubos 7 Asts: 3 Players 3

Palau Sant Jordi, Barcelona
Attendance: 3,000
Referees: Iztok Rems (SLO), Agnis Perkons (LAT)

Tournament highs

Two Israelis finished in the top ten in average points per game. Oded Kattash finished first with 22.0, and Tomer Steinhauer finished fourth with 17.1. Tomer Steinhauer finished third in average rebounds per game with 6.4. Oded Kattash finished ninth in average assists per game with 3.7. Oded Kattash finished second in average steals per game with 3.6. The Israeli team also finished fifth overall for teams average steals per game, with 14.4. Three Israelis finished in the top ten for average minutes per game, Oded Kattash finished first with 38.4, Tomer Steinhauer finished third with 34.5 and Nadav Henefeld finished fifth with 33.6. The Israeli team finished first in average free throw percentage over the tournament, with a 76.5% average. Additionally during their game against France they had the highest free throw percentage for any team during a single game, with 90.3% after going 10 for 11.

Roster

Israel men's national basketball team roster
Players
Coaches

Pos.	No.	Name	Age – Date of birth	Height	Club
F	4	Nadav Henefeld	29 – 19 June 1968	2.02 m (6 ft 8 in)	Maccabi Tel Aviv B.C.	(Israel)
PG	5	Lior Arditty	29 – 16 December 1967	1.92 m (6 ft 4 in)
G	6	Papi Turgeman	27 – 7 April 1970	1.92 m (6 ft 4 in)	Hapoel Jerusalem B.C.	(Israel)
PF	7	Amir Muchtari	25 – 12 June 1972	2.08 m (6 ft 10 in)	Hapoel Galil Elyon	(Israel)
PF	8	David Bernsley	28 – 6 May 1969
PG	9	Oren Aharoni	23 – 12 November 1973	2.02 m (6 ft 8 in)	Maccabi Ramat Gan B.C.	(Israel)
PG	10	Oded Kattash	22 – 10 October 1974	1.92 m (6 ft 4 in)	Maccabi Tel Aviv B.C.	(Israel)
G	11	Doron Sheffer	25 – 12 March 1972	1.95 m (6 ft 5 in)	Maccabi Tel Aviv B.C.	(Israel)
F	12	Gur Shelef	23 – 10 January 1974	2.04 m (6 ft 8 in)	Hapoel Galil Elyon	(Israel)
F	13	Uri Cohen-Mintz	23 – 1 August 1973	2.05 m (6 ft 9 in)	Ironi Ramat Gan	(Israel)
C	14	Tomer Steinhauer	30 – 3 October 1966	2.07 m (6 ft 9 in)	Maccabi Tel Aviv B.C.	(Israel)
C	15	Ofer Fleisher	31 – 14 March 1966

Head coach

- Zvi Sherf

Legend

- Club – describes last
  club before the tournament
- Age – describes age
  on 24 June 1997

=== 1999 EuroBasket ===
Israel competed in the EuroBasket 1999, the 31st FIBA EuroBasket, Israel's twentieth time competing, and finished ninth.

Israeli referee Reuven Virovnik also worked several games in the tournament. He was the referee for Preliminary Round Group C games Croatia vs Italy, Italy vs Bosnia and Herzegovina, and Bosnia and Herzegovina vs Croatia. In Second Round he worked Group F Turkey vs Germany, and Czech Republic vs Turkey. Additionally he worked the Quarterfinals game France vs Turkey, and Semifinals game Italy vs Yugoslavia.

Qualifier round

Team	Pld	W	L	PF	PA	PD	Pts
Spain	10	10	0	827	643	+184	20
Israel	10	7	3	749	688	+61	17
Ukraine	10	5	5	733	692	+41	15
England	10	4	6	679	726	−47	14
Belarus	10	3	7	652	774	−122	13
Denmark	10	1	9	639	771	−132	11

Team 1	Team 2	Result
Israel	Belarus	95-64
Ukraine	Israel	62-65
Denmark	Israel	76-95
Israel	Spain	61-67
England	Israel	68-82
Belarus	Israel	71-65
Ukraine	Israel	77-70
Israel	Denmark	67-63
Spain	Israel	71-63
Israel	England	79-76

Preliminary round – Group A

Team	Pld	W	L	PF	PA	PD	Pts
FR Yugoslavia	3	3	0	227	181	+46	6
France	3	2	1	200	196	+4	5
Israel	3	1	2	191	220	−29	4
North Macedonia	3	0	3	197	218	−21	3

21 June
18:00

Boxscore

Israel	61–81	FR Yugoslavia
Scoring by half: 23–38, 38–43
Pts: Sheffer 18; Rebs: Sheffer 5 Asts: Henefeld 4		Pts: Tomašević 24; Rebs: Tomašević 12; Asts: 4 Players 3

Palais des sports de Toulouse, Toulouse
Referees: Philippe Leemann (SUI), Nikolaos Pitsilkas (GRE)

22 June
20:45

Boxscore

France	77–66	Israel
Scoring by half: 37–34, 40–32
Pts: Abdul-Wahad 19; Rebs: Abdul-Wahad 8 Asts: Abdul-Wahad 3		Pts: Steinhauer 19; Rebs: Steinhauer 7 Asts: Goodes 7

Palais des sports de Toulouse, Toulouse
Referees: Philippe Leemann (SUI), Romualdas Brazauskas (LTU)

23 June
18:30

Boxscore

North Macedonia	62–64	Israel
Scoring by half: 37–29, 25–35
Pts: Stefanov 14; Rebs: Bocevski 12; Asts: Stefanov 8		Pts: Henefeld 21; Rebs: Henefeld 8 Asts: Kattash 5

Palais des sports de Toulouse, Toulouse
Referees: Romualdas Brazauskas (LTU), György Varadi (HUN)

Second round – Group E

Team	Pld	W	L	PF	PA	PD	Pts	Tie
FR Yugoslavia	6	5	1	443	386	+57	11	1–0
France	6	5	1	414	384	+30	11	0–1
Russia	6	4	2	441	409	+32	10	
Spain	6	3	3	439	454	−15	9	
Israel	6	2	4	416	467	−51	8	1–0
Slovenia	6	2	4	405	421	−16	8	0–1

26 June
20:45

Boxscore

Russia	93–84 (OT)	Israel
Scoring by half: 41–43, 35–33 Overtime: 17–8
Pts: Ruslan Avleev, Karasev 21; Rebs: Panov 10; Asts: Karasev 6		Pts: Sheffer 26; Rebs: Sheffer 7 Asts: Shelef 5

Palais des Sports de Pau, Pau
Attendance: 7,600
Referees: Danko Radić (CRO), Stefano Cazzaro (ITA)

27 June
18:30

Boxscore

Israel	67–66	Slovenia
Scoring by half: 41–28, 26–38
Pts: Goodes 16; Rebs: Henefeld, Kattash 5 Asts: Sheffer 5		Pts: Zdovc 20; Rebs: Jurković 9 Asts: Jurković, Zdovc 4

Palais des Sports de Pau, Pau
Attendance: 7,500
Referees: Philippe Leemann (SUI), Ivan Zachara (CZE)

28 June
14:45

Boxscore

Spain	88–74	Israel
Scoring by half: 36–31, 52–43
Pts: Reyes 19; Rebs: Herreros, Reyes 7 Asts: de la Fuente 4		Pts: Sheffer 17; Rebs: Steinhauer 5 Asts: Goodes 4

Palais des Sports de Pau, Pau
Referees: Danko Radić (CRO), Stefano Cazzaro (ITA)

Tournament highs

Doron Sheffer finish third in all players during the tournament for points per game, with 16.7. Two Israelis finished in the top ten for average minutes per game in the tournament. Nadav Henefeld finished sixth with 33.2, and Doron Sheffer finished seventh with 32.7. The Israeli team finished third in average assists per game, with 17.0.

Roster

Israel men's national basketball team roster
Players
Coaches

Pos.	No.	Name	Age – Date of birth	Height	Club
F	4	Nadav Henefeld	31 – 19 June 1968	2.02 m (6 ft 8 in)	Maccabi Tel Aviv	(Israel)
F	5	Mordechai Daniel	35 – 24 July 1963
PG	6	Guy Goodes	28 – 13 March 1971	1.90 m (6 ft 3 in)	Cantabria Baloncesto	(Spain)
G	7	Papi Turgeman	29 – 7 April 1970	1.92 m (6 ft 4 in)	Hapoel Jerusalem	(Israel)
C	8	Shimon Amsalem	32 – 10 November 1966
PG	9	Meir Tapiro	24 – 28 March 1975	1.92 m (6 ft 4 in)	Maccabi Haifa	(Israel)
PG	10	Oded Kattash	24 – 10 October 1974	1.92 m (6 ft 4 in)	Panathinaikos	(Greece)
G	11	Doron Sheffer	27 – 12 March 1972	1.95 m (6 ft 5 in)	Maccabi Tel Aviv	(Israel)
F	12	Gur Shelef	25 – 10 January 1974	2.04 m (6 ft 8 in)	Maccabi Tel Aviv	(Israel)
F	13	Uri Cohen-Mintz	25 – 1 August 1973	2.05 m (6 ft 9 in)	Hapoel Jerusalem	(Israel)
C	14	Tomer Steinhauer	32 – 3 October 1966	2.07 m (6 ft 9 in)	Maccabi Tel Aviv	(Israel)
PF	15	Yoav Saffar	23 – 30 September 1975	2.06 m (6 ft 9 in)	Hapoel Galil Elyon	(Israel)

Head coach

- Muli Katzurin

Legend

- Club – describes last
  club before the tournament
- Age – describes age
  on 21 June 1999

=== 2001 EuroBasket ===
Israel competed in the EuroBasket 2001, the 32nd FIBA EuroBasket, Israel's 21st time competing, and finished tenth.

Israeli referee Moise Bitton also worked several games in the tournament. He was the referee for Preliminary Round, Group C, Estonia vs Germany, and Estonia vs Croatia.

Qualifier round

Team	Pld	W	L	PF	PA	PD	Pts
Israel	10	8	2	817	703	+114	18
Bosnia and Herzegovina	10	6	4	781	760	+21	16
Netherlands	10	5	5	752	742	+10	15
Bulgaria	10	4	6	815	799	+16	14
Finland	10	4	6	795	880	−85	14
Sweden	10	3	7	762	838	−76	13

Team 1	Team 2	Result
Israel	Netherlands	90-61
Bosnia and Herzegovina	Israel	65-69
Israel	Finland	93-68
Sweden	Israel	61-75
Israel	Bulgaria	87-65
Netherlands	Israel	71-53
Israel	Bosnia and Herzegovina	97-81
Finland	Israel	68-86
Israel	Sweden	81-83
Bulgaria	Israel	80-86

Preliminary round – Group A

Team	Pld	W	L	PF	PA	PD	Pts	Tie
France	3	2	1	239	225	+14	5	1–0
Lithuania	3	2	1	215	195	+20	5	0–1
Israel	3	1	2	218	210	+8	4	1–0
Ukraine	3	1	2	214	256	−42	4	0–1

31 August
16:45

Boxscore

Israel	71–77 (OT)	France
Scoring by quarter: 12–18, 16–16, 16–15, 18–13, Overtime: 9–15
Pts: Tapiro 21; Rebs: Tapiro 12; Asts: Tapiro 7		Pts: Foirest 18; Rebs: Sciarra 10; Asts: Foirest 5

ASKI Sport Hall, Ankara
Attendance: 5,800
Referees: Carl Jungebrand (FIN), Danko Radić (CRO)

1 September
16:45

Boxscore

Lithuania	68–59	Israel
Scoring by quarter: 18–4, 9–22, 23–21, 18–12
Pts: Timinskas 15; Rebs: Timinskas 7 Asts: Jasikevičius 4		Pts: Sharp, Turgeman 12; Rebs: Green 11; Asts: Lubin 3

ASKI Sport Hall, Ankara
Attendance: 5,800
Referees: Gennaro Colucci (ITA), Ilija Belošević (SRB)

2 September
14:30

Boxscore

Ukraine	65–88	Israel
Scoring by quarter: 20–21, 13–22, 17–23, 15–22
Pts: Ryzhov 16; Rebs: Okunskyy 6 Asts: Rayevskyy 2		Pts: Saffar 19; Rebs: Green 9 Asts: Tapiro 5

ASKI Sport Hall, Ankara
Attendance: 5,800
Referees: Dubravko Muhvić (CRO), Atso Matsalu (EST)

Second round

3 September
21:15

Boxscore

Spain	71–67	Israel
Scoring by quarter: 10–11, 27–19, 16–24, 18–13
Pts: Reyes 16; Rebs: Reyes 11; Asts: Navarro 5		Pts: Turgeman 15; Rebs: Green 7 Asts: Turgeman 2

ASKI Sport Hall, Ankara
Attendance: 1,500
Referees: Nikolaos Pitsilkas (GRE), Philippe Leemann (SUI)

Tournament highs

Yaniv Green finished in ninth place among all players in the tournament for average rebounds per game, with 7.0. Yoav Saffar finished in eighth place among all players in the tournament for average steals per game, with 1.8. Lior Lubin in the game against Ukraine had more steals than anyone else in a game, with 8. Additionally the Israeli team had the highest average steals of any team, with 12.3. Two Israelis finished in the top ten of the players in the tournament in minutes per game. Derrick Sharp finished third with 34.3 and Shalom Turgeman finished fourth with 33.9.

Roster

Israel men's national basketball team roster
Players
Coaches

Pos.	No.	Name	Age – Date of birth	Height	Club
C	4	Israel Sheinfeld	25 – 1 July 1976	2.07 m (6 ft 9 in)	Wright State University	(United States)
F	5	Shahar Gordon	21 – 7 June 1980	2.10 m (6 ft 11 in)	Ironi Ramat Gan	(Israel)
G	6	Derrick Sharp	29 – 5 October 1971	1.83 m (6 ft 0 in)	Maccabi Tel Aviv	(Israel)
G	7	Papi Turgeman	31 – 7 April 1970	1.92 m (6 ft 4 in)	Hapoel Jerusalem	(Israel)
G	8	Lior Lubin	23 – 19 September 1977	1.92 m (6 ft 4 in)	Ironi Ramat Gan	(Israel)
SF	9	Ido Kozikaro	23 – 8 January 1978	2.02 m (6 ft 8 in)	Hapoel Galil Elyon	(Israel)
G	10	Afik Nissim	20 – 31 January 1981	1.80 m (5 ft 11 in)	Maccabi Rishon LeZion	(Israel)
G	11	Meir Tapiro	26 – 28 March 1975	1.92 m (6 ft 4 in)	Hapoel Jerusalem	(Israel)
F	12	Yoav Saffar	25 – 30 September 1975	2.05 m (6 ft 9 in)	Hapoel Galil Elyon	(Israel)
F	13	Barak Peleg	29 – 16 June 1972	1.94 m (6 ft 4 in)	Hapoel Jerusalem	(Israel)
C	14	Yaniv Green	21 – 16 May 1980	2.06 m (6 ft 9 in)	Bnei Herzliya	(Israel)
F	15	Moshe Mizrahi	21 – 4 April 1980	2.02 m (6 ft 8 in)	Hapoel Holon	(Israel)

Head coach

- Muli Katzurin

Legend

- Club – describes last
  club before the tournament
- Age – describes age
  on 31 August 2001

=== 2003 EuroBasket ===
Israel competed in the EuroBasket 2003, the 33rd FIBA EuroBasket, Israel's 22nd time competing, and finished seventh.

Israeli referee Shmuel Bachar also worked several games in the tournament. He was the referee for the Preliminary Round, Group D, Greece vs Croatia, and Turkey vs Greece. He was the referee in the fifth place games Serbia and Montenegro vs Greece. He also worked Quarterfinals game France vs Russia, and Semifinals game France vs Lithuania.

Qualifier round

Team	Pld	W	L	PF	PA	PD	Pts
Greece	10	9	1	889	637	+252	19
Spain	10	9	1	866	685	+181	19
Israel	10	5	5	738	707	+31	15
Romania	10	4	6	657	804	−147	14
Belgium	10	3	7	663	751	−88	13
Denmark	10	0	10	603	832	−229	10

	(Belgium)	(Denmark)	(Greece)	(Israel)	(Romania)	(Spain)
Belgium	–	79–60	59–92	69–75	69–73	63–78
Denmark	60–73	–	60–75	48–66	75–76	66–96
Greece	88–49	103–63	–	85–61	103–45	86–73
Israel	66–67	89–78	73–74	–	91–63	71–79
Romania	74–69	88–47	60–92	56–72	–	70–96
Spain	85–66	87–46	94–91	88–74	90–52	–

Preliminary round – Group B

Team	Pld	W	L	PF	PA	PD	Pts
Lithuania	3	3	0	279	224	+55	6
Germany	3	2	1	251	260	−9	5
Israel	3	1	2	234	255	−21	4
Latvia	3	0	3	252	277	−25	3

September 5
15:15

Boxscore

Germany	86–81	Israel
Scoring by quarter: 23–15, 22–23, 19–13, 22–30
Pts: Nowitzki, Okulaja 17; Rebs: Okulaja 10; Asts: Demirel 4		Pts: Tapiro 21; Rebs: Tapiro 6 Asts: Burstein, Halperin 2

Himmelstalundshallen, Norrköping
Attendance: 2,444
Referees: Lazaros Voreadis (GRE), Vladimir Okhrimenko (RUS)

September 6
17:00

Boxscore

Israel	62–94	Lithuania
Scoring by quarter: 19–23, 6–17, 18–28, 19–26
Pts: Green 12; Rebs: Kozikaro, Saffar 4 Asts: Tapiro 2		Pts: Štombergas 16; Rebs: Praškevičius, Slanina 6 Asts: Jasikevičius 5

Himmelstalundshallen, Norrköping
Attendance: 3,666
Referees: Lazaros Voreadis (GRE), Tonči Anzulović(CRO)

September 7
18:15

Boxscore

Israel	91–75	Latvia
Scoring by quarter: 29–14, 23–18, 20–21, 19–22
Pts: Burstein 21; Rebs: Burstein 8 Asts: Burstein 6		Pts: Ostlers 17; Rebs: Ostlers 6 Asts: Štelmahers 5

Himmelstalundshallen, Norrköping
Attendance: 3,850
Referees: Miguel Betancor (ESP), Grzegorz Ziemblicki (POL)

Second round

September 8
20:30

Boxscore

Slovenia	76–78	Israel
Scoring by quarter: 28–16, 15–21, 10–23, 23–18
Pts: Gorenc 21; Rebs: Nachbar 6 Asts: Lakovič 3		Pts: Green 14; Rebs: Green 10; Asts: Tapiro 9

Coop Arena, Luleå
Attendance: 1,843
Referees: Volodymyr Drabikovskyi (UKR), Ilija Belošević (SRB)

Quarterfinals

Quarter-finals
September 10 – 18:00
France	76
Russia	69
September 10 – 21:00
Lithuania	98
Serbia and Montenegro	82
September 11 – 18:00
Spain	78
Israel	64
September 11 – 21:00
Greece	59
Italy	62

Semi-finals
September 13 – 14:00
France	70
Lithuania	74
September 13 – 17:00
Spain	81
Italy	78

Final
September 14 – 20:00
Lithuania	93
Spain	84
Third place
September 14 – 17:00
France	67
Italy	69

September 11
18:00

Boxscore

Spain	78–64	Israel
Scoring by quarter: 28–22, 16–14, 14–15, 20–13
Pts: Gasol 25; Rebs: Gasol 7 Asts: Calderón 4		Pts: Sharp 16; Rebs: Tapiro 6 Asts: Tapiro 5

Stockholm Globe Arena, Stockholm
Attendance: 8,466
Referees: Memduh Öget (TUR), Grzegorz Ziemblicki (POL)

Knockout Stage – Place 5-8

Classification round
September 12 – 18:00
Russia	77
Serbia and Montenegro	86
September 12 – 21:00
Israel	56
Greece	63

Fifth place
September 14 – 13:30
Serbia and Montenegro	64
Greece	72
Seventh place
September 14 – 11:00
Russia	82
Israel	89

September 12
21:00

Boxscore

Israel	56–63	Greece
Scoring by quarter: 10–17, 12–19, 17–15, 17–12
Pts: Halperin 12; Rebs: Green 7 Asts: Halperin 3		Pts: Fotsis 19; Rebs: Fotsis 10; Asts: Papaloukas 5

Stockholm Globe Arena, Stockholm
Attendance: 9,892
Referees: Luigi Lamonica (ITA), Stelian Banica (ROU)

September 14
11:00

Boxscore

Russia	82–89	Israel
Scoring by quarter: 18–16, 18–20, 21–22, 25–31
Pts: Monia 26; Rebs: Karasev, Monia 6 Asts: Kirilenko, Monia 4		Pts: Tapiro 26; Rebs: Green 7 Asts: Burstein 4

Stockholm Globe Arena, Stockholm
Attendance: 7,723
Referees: Grzegorz Ziemblicki (POL), Fedor Dmitriev (BLR)

Tournament highs

Two Israelis finish in the top ten in average assists per game. Meir Tapiro finished fourth with 3.4 and Tal Burstein finished ninth with 2.4. Two Israelis finished in the top ten in average steals per game. Meir Tapiro finished third with 1.9 and Tal Burstein finished seventh with 1.3. Meir Tapiro also finished tied with the tournament high of five steals in a game. Israel as a team also finished fifth with average steals per game for a team, with 7.0. Tal Burstein finished fifth in all players in the tournament in minutes per game with 31.6. Israel during the game against Latvia had the highest 3-point field goal percentage of the tournament of 55.6% after going ten for eighteen. Israel during the game against Spain had the highest free throw percentage of the tournament, of 100% after going six for six.

Roster

Israel men's national basketball team roster
Players
Coaches

Pos.	No.	Name	Age – Date of birth	Height	Club
G	4	Erez Katz	23 – 9 April 1980	1.90 m (6 ft 3 in)	Hapoel Jerusalem	(Israel)
G	5	Yotam Halperin	19 – 24 January 1984	1.93 m (6 ft 4 in)	Maccabi Tel Aviv	(Israel)
G	6	Derrick Sharp	31 – 5 October 1971	1.83 m (6 ft 0 in)	Maccabi Tel Aviv	(Israel)
F	7	Moshe Mizrahi	23 – 4 April 1980	2.02 m (6 ft 8 in)	Hapoel Jerusalem	(Israel)
C	8	Israel Sheinfeld	27 – 1 July 1976	2.07 m (6 ft 9 in)	Hapoel Tel Aviv	(Israel)
F	9	Gur Shelef	29 – 10 January 1974	2.01 m (6 ft 7 in)	Maccabi Tel Aviv	(Israel)
G	10	Tal Burstein	23 – 19 February 1980	1.98 m (6 ft 6 in)	Maccabi Tel Aviv	(Israel)
G	11	Meir Tapiro	28 – 28 March 1975	1.92 m (6 ft 4 in)	Hapoel Jerusalem	(Israel)
F	12	Yoav Saffar	27 – 30 September 1975	2.05 m (6 ft 9 in)	Maccabi Tel Aviv	(Israel)
SF	13	Ido Kozikaro	25 – 8 January 1978	2.02 m (6 ft 8 in)	Hapoel Galil Elyon	(Israel)
C	14	Yaniv Green	23 – 16 May 1980	2.06 m (6 ft 9 in)	Hapoel Tel Aviv	(Israel)
F	15	Shahar Gordon	23 – 7 June 1980	2.10 m (6 ft 11 in)	Maccabi Rishon LeZion	(Israel)

Head coach

- Muli Katzurin

Legend

- Club – describes last
  club before the tournament
- Age – describes age
  on 5 September 2003

=== 2005 EuroBasket ===
Israel competed in the EuroBasket 2005, the 34th FIBA EuroBasket, Israel's 23rd time competing, and finished ninth.

Israeli referee Seffi Shemmesh also worked several games in the tournament, including Preliminary Round, Group A, games Germany vs Italy, Italy vs Russia, and Italy vs Ukraine, and fifth place game of Lithuania vs Slovenia. Additionally, referee Shmuel Bachar worked Preliminary Round, Group B, games Turkey vs Lithuania, and Bulharia vs Turkey, the third place game France vs Spain, and classification round games Russia vs Lithuania, and Slovenia vs Croatia.

Qualifying round – Group 2

Team	Pld	W	L	PF	PA	PD	Pts
Latvia	6	4	2	517	451	+66	10
Bulgaria	6	4	2	487	495	−8	10
Israel	6	3	3	471	467	+4	9
Portugal	6	1	5	473	535	−62	7

	(Bulgaria)	(Israel)	(Latvia)	(Portugal)
Bulgaria	–	72–65	96–85	89–87
Israel	64–84	–	79–77	96–101
Latvia	102–79	80–57	–	92–64
Portugal	72–87	73–90	76–81	–

Additional qualifying round – Group B

Team	Pld	W	L	PF	PA	PD	Pts
Israel	4	4	0	319	280	+39	8
Belgium	4	2	2	280	262	+18	6
Netherlands	4	0	4	252	309	−57	4

	(Belgium)	(Israel)	(Netherlands)
Belgium	–	75–79	76–63
Israel	69–67	–	89–60
Netherlands	51–62	78–82	–

Final qualifying stage

Qualified for FIBA EuroBasket 2005

Times given below are in Central European Summer Time (UTC+2).

Team	Pld	W	L	PF	PA	PD	Pts
Israel	2	2	0	166	147	+19	4
Hungary	2	1	1	153	162	−9	3
Czech Republic	2	0	2	157	167	−10	2

12 September 2005
20:00

Boxscore

Czech Republic	78–83	Israel
Scoring by quarter: 26–21, 19–21, 15–16, 18–25

Novi Sad, Serbia

13 September 2005
20:00

Boxscore

Israel	83–69	Hungary
Scoring by quarter: 23–17, 17–17, 18–20, 25–15

Novi Sad, Serbia

Preliminary round – Group D

Team	Pld	W	L	PF	PA	PD	Pts
Spain	3	2	1	280	264	+16	5
Serbia and Montenegro	3	2	1	245	233	+12	5
Israel	3	2	1	236	235	+1	5
Latvia	3	0	3	241	270	−29	3

16 September
17:30

Boxscore

Latvia	65–74	Israel
Scoring by quarter: 18–23, 23–15, 8–18, 16–18
Pts: Štelmahers 19; Rebs: Helmanis 6 Asts: Šķēle, Štelmahers 2		Pts: Hajaj 18; Rebs: Tapiro 10; Asts: Shelef, Tapiro 4

Spens Sports Center, Novi Sad
Attendance: 7,200
Referees: Guerrino Cerebuch (ITA), Mehmet Keseratar (TUR), Oliver Krause (GER)

17 September
20:30

Boxscore

Israel	77–93	Serbia and Montenegro
Scoring by quarter: 21–25, 17–22, 27–20, 12–26
Pts: Burstein 20; Rebs: Green 10; Asts: Burstein 6		Pts: Jarić 19; Rebs: Krstić 10; Asts: Rakočević 6

Spens Sports Center, Novi Sad
Attendance: 6,500
Referees: Guerrino Cerebuch (ITA), Volodymyr Drabikovskyi (UKR), Vladimir Tsekov (BUL)

18 September
17:30

Boxscore

Spain	77–85	Israel
Scoring by quarter: 16–17, 12–16, 31–32, 18–20
Pts: Garbajosa 21; Rebs: Garbajosa, Reyes 9 Asts: Navarro 4		Pts: Burstein 19; Rebs: 4 Players 4 Asts: Burstein, Tapiro 5

Spens Sports Center, Novi Sad
Attendance: 6,500
Referees: Volodymyr Drabikovskyi (UKR), Vladimir Okhrimenko (RUS), Vladimir Tsekov (BUL)

Knockout stage

20 September
20:30

Boxscore

Greece	67–61	Israel
Scoring by quarter: 14–6, 11–8, 24–27, 18–20
Pts: Zisis 23; Rebs: Papadopoulos 10; Asts: Zisis 6		Pts: Green 11; Rebs: Burstein 6 Asts: Burstein 6

Pionir Hall, Belgrade
Attendance: 5,500
Referees: Luigi Lamonica (ITA), Dubravko Muhvic (CRO), Virginijus Dovidavicius (LTU)

Tournament highs

Tal Burstein and Meir Tapiro both tied for third in average number of assists per game, with 4.0. Israel also finished in first for assists for all teams in the tournament, with an average of 14.3 per game. Dror Hajaj and Meir Tapiro both tied for second in average number of steals per game, with 3.0. Israel also finished in second for steals for all teams in the tournament, with an average of 11.8 per game. Yaniv Green was tied for seventh place on average number of blocks per game, with 1.0. Two Israelis finished in the top ten in average minutes per game. Tal Burstein finished fourth with 34.5, and Meir Tapiro finished tenth with 31.3. Tal Burstein in the game against Greece, lead all players in the tournament in an individual game in turnovers, with 8.

Roster

Israel men's national basketball team roster
Players
Coaches

Pos.	No.	Name	Age – Date of birth	Height	Club
	4	Dror Hajaj	26 – 31 December 1978		Spotter Leuven	(Belgium)
G	5	Afik Nissim	24 – 31 January 1981	1.80 m (5 ft 11 in)	Strasbourg IG	(France)
F	6	Sharon Shason	26 – 16 March 1979	2.02 m (6 ft 8 in)	Ural Great Perm	(Russia)
	7	Chris Watson	30 – 16 July 1975
C	8	Erez Markovich	27 – 10 July 1978	2.08 m (6 ft 10 in)	Ironi Nahariya	(Israel)
F	9	Gur Shelef	31 – 10 January 1974	2.01 m (6 ft 7 in)	Maccabi Tel Aviv	(Israel)
G	10	Tal Burstein	25 – 19 February 1980	1.98 m (6 ft 6 in)	Maccabi Tel Aviv	(Israel)
G	11	Meir Tapiro	30 – 28 March 1975	1.92 m (6 ft 4 in)	SLUC Nancy	(France)
F	12	Moshe Mizrahi	25 – 4 April 1980	2.02 m (6 ft 8 in)	Hapoel Galil Elyon	(Israel)
SF	13	Ido Kozikaro	27 – 8 January 1978	2.02 m (6 ft 8 in)	Hapoel Jerusalem	(Israel)
C	14	Yaniv Green	25 – 16 May 1980	2.06 m (6 ft 9 in)	Maccabi Tel Aviv	(Israel)
G	15	Yotam Halperin	21 – 24 January 1984	1.93 m (6 ft 4 in)	Maccabi Tel Aviv	(Israel)

Head coach

- Zvi Sherf

Legend

- Club – describes last
  club before the tournament
- Age – describes age
  on 15 September 2005

=== 2007 EuroBasket ===
Israel competed in the EuroBasket 2007, the 35th FIBA EuroBasket, Israel's 24th time competing, and finished eleventh. Games were broadcast in Israel on Sport 5 and Channel 10.

Qualifying Round – Group 2

Team	Pld	W	L	PF	PA	PD	Pts
Portugal	6	4	2	462	447	+15	10
North Macedonia	6	3	3	486	493	−7	9
Bosnia and Herzegovina	6	3	3	482	459	+23	9
Israel	6	2	4	431	462	−31	8

	(Bosnia and Herzegovina)	(Israel)	(North Macedonia)	(Portugal)
Bosnia and Herzegovina	–	85–63	75–72	78–80
Israel	88–81	–	83–70	61–67
North Macedonia	81–77	90–87	–	83–63
Portugal	75–86	69–49	108–90	–

Additional qualifying round – Group C

Team	Pld	W	L	PF	PA	PD	Pts
Israel	6	5	1	485	421	+64	11
Belgium	6	5	1	442	400	+42	11
Ukraine	6	1	5	409	445	−36	7
Denmark	6	1	5	417	487	−70	7

	(Belgium)	(Denmark)	(Israel)	(Ukraine)
Belgium	–	80–66	83–74	72–69
Denmark	61–71	–	60–72	90–85
Israel	85–66	105–76	–	81–73
Ukraine	45–70	74–64	63–68	–

Final qualifying stage

Qualified for FIBA EuroBasket 2007

Times given below are in Central European Summer Time (UTC+2).

Team	Pld	W	L	PF	PA	PD	Pts
Israel	2	2	0	159	147	+12	4
North Macedonia	2	1	1	160	155	+5	3
Bosnia and Herzegovina	2	0	2	123	140	−17	2

30 August 2007
20:30

Boxscore

Bosnia and Herzegovina	60–67	Israel
Scoring by quarter: 7–23, 27–15, 15–16, 11–13

Minorca, Spain
Attendance: 1,500

31 August 2007
20:30

Boxscore

Israel	92–87	North Macedonia
Scoring by quarter: 25–18, 17–23, 29–19, 21–27

Minorca, Spain
Attendance: 1,700

Preliminary round – Group A

Team	Pld	W	L	PF	PA	PD	Pts
Russia	3	3	0	224	174	+50	6
Greece	3	2	1	197	194	+3	5
Israel	3	1	2	209	249	−40	4
Serbia	3	0	3	215	228	−13	3

3 September
20:00

Boxscore

Israel	66–76	Greece
Scoring by quarter: 16–19, 15–12, 17–21, 18–24
Pts: Halperin 20; Rebs: Tapiro 8 Asts: Halperin, Tapiro 6		Pts: Spanoulis 19; Rebs: Dikoudis 6 Asts: Tsartsaris 3

Palacio Municipal de Deportes de Granada, Granada
Attendance: 4,000
Referees: Saša Pukl (SLO), Virginijus Dovidavičius (LTU), Borys Ryzhyk (UKR)

4 September
18:00

Boxscore

Russia	90–56	Israel
Scoring by quarter: 17–15, 23–13, 26–13, 24–15
Pts: Holden 18; Rebs: Kirilenko 13; Asts: Khryapa, Kirilenko5		Pts: Eliyahu 17; Rebs: Green 8 Asts: Pnini 2

Palacio Municipal de Deportes de Granada, Granada
Attendance: 4,350
Referees: Saša Pukl (SLO), Borys Ryzhyk (UKR), Eddie Viator (FRA)

5 September
18:00

Boxscore

Israel	87–83	Serbia
Scoring by quarter: 16–23, 20–22, 25–15, 26–23
Pts: Green 26; Rebs: Green 12; Asts: Tapiro 4		Pts: Gurović 19; Rebs: Miličić 13; Asts: Jarić 6

Palacio Municipal de Deportes de Granada, Granada
Attendance: 3,500
Referees: Saša Pukl (SLO), Borys Ryzhyk (UKR), Eddie Viator (FRA)

Second round – Group E

Team	Pld	W	L	PF	PA	PD	Pts
Spain	5	4	1	422	341	+81	9
Russia	5	4	1	381	325	+56	9
Greece	5	3	2	353	348	+5	8
Croatia	5	2	3	398	396	+2	7
Portugal	5	1	4	350	420	−70	6
Israel	5	1	4	360	434	−74	6

7 September
19:00

Boxscore

Israel	80–75	Croatia
Scoring by quarter: 14–17, 19–18, 20–16, 27–24
Pts: Green 17; Rebs: Green 16; Asts: Tapiro 7		Pts: Kasun 18; Rebs: Kasun, Markota 7 Asts: Kus 4

Madrid Arena, Madrid
Attendance: 3,500
Referees: Fabio Facchini (ITA), Zoran Šutulović (MNE), Oliver Lefwerth (SWE)

9 September
16:30

Boxscore

Portugal	94–85	Israel
Scoring by quarter: 28–14, 18–20, 19–14, 29–37
Pts: Gomes 23; Rebs: Gomes 11; Asts: da Silva 9		Pts: Eliyahu 29; Rebs: Eliyahu 9 Asts: Tapiro 6

Madrid Arena, Madrid
Attendance: 4,500
Referees: Kestutis Pilipauskas (LTU), Anibal Castaño (FRA), Oļegs Latiševs (LAT)

11 September
21:30

Boxscore

Spain	99–73	Israel
Scoring by quarter: 19–29, 28–19, 27–20, 25–5
Pts: P. Gasol 26; Rebs: Jiménez 7 Asts: 3 Players 3		Pts: 3 Players 15; Rebs: Green 10; Asts: Tapiro 7

Madrid Arena, Madrid
Attendance: 9,500
Referees: Volodymyr Drabikovskyi (UKR), Milivoje Jovčić (SRB), Eddie Viator (FRA)

Tournament records

Yotam Halperin finished in seventh place in average points per game, with 14.0.

Yaniv Green finished in first place in average rebounds per game, with 9.3.

Two Israelis finished in the top ten average assists per game. Meir Tapiro finished in second place with 5.0, and Yotam Halperin finished in seventh place with 2.8. Additionally Israel finished in third place a team in the tournament with an average of 13.7 assists per game.

Meir Tapiro finished in fourth place in average steals per game, with 1.5.

Yaniv Green finished in fourth place in average blocks per game, with 1.5.

Yotam Halperin finished in seventh place in average minutes per game, with 31.5.

Roster

Israel men's national basketball team roster
Players
Coaches

Pos.	No.	Name	Age – Date of birth	Height	Club
G	4	Dror Hajaj	28 – 31 December 1978	1.78 m (5 ft 10 in)	Hapoel Jerusalem	(Israel)
G	5	Moran Roth	24 – 10 November 1982	1.80 m (5 ft 11 in)	Hapoel Holon	(Israel)
G	6	Yotam Halperin	23 – 24 January 1984	1.93 m (6 ft 4 in)	Maccabi Tel Aviv	(Israel)
F	7	Lior Eliyahu	21 – 9 September 1985	2.03 m (6 ft 8 in)	Maccabi Tel Aviv	(Israel)
C	8	Erez Markovich	29 – 10 July 1978	2.08 m (6 ft 10 in)	Hapoel Jerusalem	(Israel)
G	9	Jeron Roberts	30 – 10 November 1976	1.94 m (6 ft 4 in)	Demon Astronauts Amsterdam	(Netherlands)
F	10	Guy Pnini	23 – 4 September 1983	2.01 m (6 ft 7 in)	Hapoel Jerusalem	(Israel)
G	11	Meir Tapiro	32 – 28 March 1975	1.92 m (6 ft 4 in)	Bnei HaSharon	(Israel)
G	12	Matan Naor	26 – 3 November 1980	1.94 m (6 ft 4 in)	Ironi Nahariya	(Israel)
SF	13	Ido Kozikaro	29 – 8 January 1978	2.02 m (6 ft 8 in)	Ironi Nahariya	(Israel)
C	14	Yaniv Green	27 – 16 May 1980	2.06 m (6 ft 9 in)	CSK VVS Samara	(Russia)
C	15	Amit Tamir	27 – 2 December 1979	2.08 m (6 ft 10 in)	Cherkaski Monkeys	(Ukraine)

Head coach

- Zvi Sherf

Legend

- Club – describes last
  club before the tournament
- Age – describes age
  on 3 September 2007

=== 2009 EuroBasket ===
Israel competed in the EuroBasket 2009, the 36th FIBA EuroBasket, Israel's 25th time competing, and finished thirteenth. Games were broadcast in Israel on Sport 5 and Channel 1.

Referees

Several Israeli referees worked the tournament as well.

Omer Esteron worked Qualification Round, Group C, Ukraine vs Turkey, and Relegation Round, Ukraine vs Czech Republic.

Shmuel Bachar worked Qualification Round, Group A, Serbia vs Bulgaria, Group C, Turkey vs France, and Relegation Round, Ukraine vs Hungary. During the Preliminary Round he worked Group D, Poland vs Bulgaria, Bulgaria vs Turkey, and Poland vs Turkey. During the Second Round, Group F, he worked Turkey vs Spain, Slovenia vs Poland, and Poland vs Spain. During the quarterfinals he worked Turkey vs Greece.

Seffi Shemmesh worked Qualification Round, Group A, Serbia vs Italy, and Group C, Turkey vs Belgium,

Moise Bitton worked Qualification Round, Group C, Turkey vs Ukraine.

Gil Oved worked Qualification Round, Group C, Ukraine vs Belgium.

Gili Cohen worked Additional Qualifying Round, Group A, Bosnia and Herzegovina vs Portugal.

Qualifying round – Group D

Team	Pts	W	L	PF	PA	Diff
Great Britain	10	4	2	504	482	+22
Israel	9	3	3	515	491	+24
Bosnia and Herzegovina	9	3	3	465	470	−5
Czech Republic	8	2	4	432	473	−41

3 September 2008
19:00

Game 2

Israel	102–92 (OT)	Great Britain
Scoring by quarter: 19–25, 23–22, 27–20, 16–18, Overtime: 17–7
Pts: Tapiro 27; Rebs: Green 6 Asts: Tapiro 6		Pts: Deng 30; Rebs: Freeland 9 Asts: Mensah-Bonsu 6

Nokia Arena, Tel Aviv
Attendance: 7,000
Referees: Petr Sudek (Slovakia), Charalampos Karakatsounis (Greece), Ismail Özgün (Turkey)

6 September 2008
20:00

Game 4

Bosnia and Herzegovina	77–71	Israel
Scoring by quarter: 22–15, 19–18, 17–24, 19–14
Pts: Bajramović, Opačak 13; Rebs: Jazvin 9 Asts: Gordić 3		Pts: Tamir 13; Rebs: Green 7 Asts: Tapiro 3

SKPC Mejdan, Tuzla
Attendance: 5,000
Referees: Christos Christodoulou (Greece), Marko Juras (Serbia), Radomir Vojinović (Montenegro)

10 September 2008
18:00

Game 5

Czech Republic	91–70	Israel
Scoring by quarter: 18–12, 18–16, 27–19, 28–23
Pts: Welsch, Benda 20; Rebs: Starosta 9 Asts: Welsch 8		Pts: Pnini 22; Rebs: Casspi 8 Asts: Casspi, Halperin, Pnini 2

ČEZ Arena, Pardubice
Attendance: 4,670
Referees: Gianluca Mattioli (Italy), Fabien Conderanne (France), Anastasios Piloidis (Greece)

13 September 2008
19:00

Game 8

Great Britain	96–86	Israel
Scoring by quarter: 22–19, 31–21, 23–14, 20–32
Pts: Mensah-Bonsu 22; Rebs: Mensah-Bonsu 11; Asts: Deng, Reinking 5		Pts: Eliyahu 24; Rebs: Pnini 5 Asts: Tapiro 4

Liverpool Echo Arena, Liverpool
Attendance: 2,350
Referees: Daniel Hierrezuelo (Spain), Eddie Viator (France), Oliver Krause (Germany)

17 September 2008
18:00

Game 10

Israel	88–74	Bosnia and Herzegovina
Scoring by quarter: 19–24, 21–21, 25–14, 23–15
Pts: Halperin 22; Rebs: Eliyahu 17; Asts: Eliyahu 6		Pts: Ikonić 17; Rebs: Opačak 7 Asts: Gordić 6

Nokia Arena, Tel Aviv
Attendance: 6,000
Referees: Fabio Facchini (Italy), Mehmet Keseratar (Turkey), Panagiotis Anastopoulos (Greece)

20 September 2008
21:00

Game 11

Israel	98–61	Czech Republic
Scoring by quarter: 28–17, 21–18, 29–19, 20–7
Pts: Halperin 25; Rebs: Eliyahu 9 Asts: Halperin 7		Pts: Benda 16; Rebs: Benda 5 Asts: Welsch 6

Nokia Arena, Tel Aviv
Attendance: 8,000
Referees: Christos Christodoulou (Greece), Emin Mogulkoc (Turkey), Antonis Demetriou (Cyprus)

First round – Group A

Team	Pld	W	L	PF	PA	PD	Pts
Greece	3	3	0	268	202	+66	6
Croatia	3	2	1	235	226	+9	5
North Macedonia	3	1	2	207	246	−39	4
Israel	3	0	3	238	274	−36	3

7 September
19:15

Report

Croatia	86–79	Israel
Scoring by quarter: 25–17, 17–20, 17–22, 27–20
Pts: Vujčić 21; Rebs: Kasun, Planinić 7 Asts: Planinić 3		Pts: Eliyahu 31; Rebs: Eliyahu 6 Asts: Halperin 4

Attendance: 1,600
Referees: Daniel Hierrezuelo (ESP), Zoran Šutulović (MNE), Dimitar Gologanov (BUL)

8 September
16:30

Report

Israel	79–82	North Macedonia
Scoring by quarter: 19–17, 20–23, 16–20, 24–22
Pts: Burstein 25; Rebs: Mekel 7 Asts: Burstein, Eliyahu 4		Pts: Antić 19; Rebs: Stefanov 8 Asts: Stefanov 4

Attendance: 1,600
Referees: Ilija Belošević (SRB), Daniel Hierrezuelo (ESP), Matej Boltauzer (SLO)

9 September
19:15

Report

Israel	80–106	Greece
Scoring by quarter: 25–31, 17–25, 23–23, 15–27
Pts: Eliyahu 21; Rebs: Green, Eliyahu 8 Asts: Eliyahu 4		Pts: Spanoulis 18; Rebs: Koufos 8 Asts: Spanoulis 5

Attendance: 1,200
Referees: Ilija Belošević (SRB), Zoran Šutulović (MNE), Jakub Zamojski (POL)

Roster

Coach: Zvi Sherf

No	Player	Height (m)	Height (f)	Position	Year born	Current Club
4	Moran Rot	1.83	6' 00"	Guard	1982	(Israel) Hapoel Jerusalem
5	Yuval Naimi	1.87	6' 02"	Guard	1988	(Israel) Hapoel Jerusalem
6	Gal Mekel	1.95	6' 05"	Guard	1988	(Israel) Maccabi Tel Aviv
7	Raviv Limonad	1.91	6' 03"	Guard	1984	(Israel) Maccabi Tel Aviv
8	Guy Pnini	2.01	6' 07"	Forward	1983	(Israel) Maccabi Tel Aviv
9	Yotam Halperin	1.96	6' 05"	Guard	1984	(Greece) Olympiacos
10	Tal Burstein	1.98	6' 06"	Guard	1980	(Israel) Maccabi Tel Aviv
11	Lior Eliyahu	2.07	6' 09"	Forward	1985	(Spain) Caja Laboral
12	Moshe Mizrahi	2.02	6' 08"	Forward	1980	(Israel) Maccabi Haifa
13	Ido Kozikaro	2.02	6' 08"	Forward	1978	(Israel) Maccabi Haifa
14	Yaniv Green	2.06	6' 09"	Center	1980	(Israel) Maccabi Tel Aviv
15	Amit Tamir	2.09	6' 10"	Center	1979	(Israel) Ironi Ashkelon

=== 2011 EuroBasket ===
Israel competed in the EuroBasket 2011, the 37th FIBA EuroBasket, Israel's 26th time competing, and finished thirteenth. Games were broadcast in Israel on IBA and Charlton.

Each team during the tournament consisted of 12 players. Only 1 among the 12 could be a naturalized foreign player, who could not have been in the national team of another nation. Players that traced their ancestry to the teams they represent, were allowed to play for that team. US-born David Blu, who as Jewish was entitled to Israeli citizenship from birth.

Qualifying round – Group A

Team	Pts	W	L	PF	PA	Diff
Montenegro	14	6	2	645	561	+84
Israel	13	5	3	671	603	+68
Italy	13	5	3	630	615	+15
Latvia	11	3	5	636	722	−86
Finland	9	1	7	599	680	−81

2 August 2010
20:30

Report

Italy	71–79	Israel
Scoring by quarter: 19–20, 14–25, 22–22, 16–12
Pts: Bargnani, Belinelli 20; Rebs: Bargnani 8 Asts: Datome, Belinelli 2		Pts: Halperin 16; Rebs: Bluthenthal 7 Asts: Casspi 5

Palaflorio, Bari
Attendance: 4,500
Referees: Ilija Belosevic, Juan Arteaga, David Chambon

8 August 2010
18:00

Report

Israel	110–88	Latvia
Scoring by quarter: 37–18, 18–22, 24–23, 31–25
Pts: Casspi 21; Rebs: Casspi 8 Asts: Burstein 6		Pts: Kuksiks 24; Rebs: Bērziņš 7 Asts: Strelnieks 6

Nokia Arena, Tel Aviv
Attendance: 11,000
Referees: Spyridon Gontas, Dragan Neskovic, Virginijus Dovidavicius

11 August 2010
19:00

Report

Finland	84–83	Israel
Scoring by quarter: 18–22, 26–26, 23–18, 17–17
Pts: Huff, Virtanen 13; Rebs: Kotti 10; Asts: Huff, Iisalo 2		Pts: Halperin 18; Rebs: three players 5 Asts: Burstein 3

Barona Areena, Espoo
Attendance: 1,704
Referees: Romualdas Brazauskas, Tomasz Kudlicki, Aare Halliko

14 August 2010
20:30

Report

Israel	77–73	Montenegro
Scoring by quarter: 26–22, 14–18, 19–21, 18–12
Pts: Casspi 30; Rebs: Bluthenthal, Eliyahu 5 Asts: Halperin 5		Pts: Peković 20; Rebs: Dragicevic 8 Asts: Cook 8

Nokia Arena, Tel Aviv
Attendance: 11,000
Referees: Milan Brziak, Christos Christodoulou, Marius Ciulin

17 August 2010
18:30

Report

Israel	76–81	Italy
Scoring by quarter: 17–22, 22–26, 21–21, 16–12
Pts: Casspi 20; Rebs: Casspi 10; Asts: Halperin 5		Pts: Bargnani 26; Rebs: Belinelli 8 Asts: Belinelli 6

Nokia Arena, Tel Aviv
Attendance: 11,000
Referees: Engin Kennerman, Daniel Hierrezuelo, Sasa Maricic

23 August 2010
20:30

Report

Latvia	56–92	Israel
Scoring by quarter: 15–18, 11–36, 15–14, 15–24
Pts: Selakovs 14; Rebs: Freimanis 7 Asts: Strelnieks 4		Pts: Pnini 14; Rebs: three players 6 Asts: Naimy 4

Arena Riga, Riga
Attendance: 3,600
Referees: Ivo Dolinek, Jakub Zamojski, Mindaugas Vecerskis

26 August 2010
18:00

Report

Israel	85–71	Finland
Scoring by quarter: 13–22, 19–11, 34–20, 19–18
Pts: Eliyahu 18; Rebs: Eliyahu 13; Asts: Halperin 5		Pts: Huff 16; Rebs: Huff 8 Asts: Kotti 3

Nokia Arena, Tel Aviv
Attendance: 11,000
Referees: Mehmet Keseratar, Milan Mazic, Alfred Jovovic

29 August 2010
21:00

Report

Montenegro	79–69	Israel
Scoring by quarter: 24–20, 13–21, 19–16, 21–12
Pts: Dragicevic 20; Rebs: Dragicevic 8 Asts: Jeretin, Cook 3		Pts: Casspi, Eliyahu 18; Rebs: Eliyahu 8 Asts: Naimy 5

Morača Sports Center, Podgorica
Attendance: 4,300
Referees: Sreten Radovic, Antonio Conde, Sérgio Silva

Preliminary Round – Group B

Team	Pld	W	L	PF	PA	GA	Pts.
France	5	5	0	438	391	1.120	10
Serbia	5	4	1	432	386	1.119	9
Germany	5	3	2	377	357	1.056	8
Israel	5	2	3	399	448	0.891	7
Italy	5	1	4	380	405	0.938	6
Latvia	5	0	5	385	424	0.908	5

August 31, 2011
21:00

Report

Germany	91–64	Israel
Scoring by quarter: 15–14, 25–12, 25–17, 26–21
Pts: Nowitzki 25; Rebs: Kaman 10; Asts: Hamann 4		Pts: Pnini 20; Rebs: Eliyahu 6 Asts: Ohayon 3

Šiauliai Arena, Šiauliai
Attendance: 2,600
Referees: Srdan Dozai (CRO), Apostolos Kalpakas (SWE), Anton Makhlin (RUS)

September 1, 2011
17:45

Report

Israel	68–85	France
Scoring by quarter: 14–24, 21–18, 13–22, 20–21
Pts: Eliyahu, Halperin 15; Rebs: Burstein, Kadir 4 Asts: Mekel 3		Pts: Parker 21; Rebs: Noah 9 Asts: Parker 8

Šiauliai Arena, Šiauliai
Attendance: 2,100

September 2, 2011
15:15

Report

Serbia	89–80	Israel
Scoring by quarter: 22–25, 13–16, 23–23, 31–16
Pts: Savanović 24; Rebs: four players 7 Asts: Teodosić 5		Pts: Halperin 18; Rebs: Kadir 10; Asts: Nissim 9

Šiauliai Arena, Šiauliai
Attendance: 2,500
Referees: Volodymyr Drabikovsky (UKR), Aleksandar Milojevik (MKD), David Berekashvili (GEO)

September 4, 2011
15:15

Report

Israel	91–88	Latvia
Scoring by quarter: 23–22, 24–23, 19–22, 25–21
Pts: Eliyahu 26; Rebs: Eliyahu 10; Asts: Mekel 4		Pts: Blūms 27; Rebs: Šeļakovs 9 Asts: Blūms 6

Šiauliai Arena, Šiauliai
Attendance: 3,500
Referees: Ademir Zurapovic (BIH), Anton Makhlin (RUS), David Berekashvili (GEO)

September 5, 2011
15:15

Report

Israel	96–95 (OT)	Italy
Scoring by quarter: 27–26, 22–15, 30–19, 5–24, Overtime: 12–11
Pts: Pnini 22; Rebs: Eliyahu 7 Asts: Halperin 5		Pts: Bargnani 26; Rebs: Bargnani 11; Asts: Hackett 5

Šiauliai Arena, Šiauliai
Attendance: 2,000
Referees: Ademir Zurapovic (BIH), Apostolos Kalpakas (SWE), Anton Makhlin (RUS)

Tournament highs

Israel during the tournament finished fifth in average points per game with 79.8. They also finished seventh in average assists per game with 14.8, and tenth in average steals per game, with 6.4.

Roster

Israeli National Basketball Team roster
Players
Coaches

Pos.	No.	Name	Age – Date of birth	Height	Club	Ctr.
PG	4	Yogev Ohayon	24 – 24 April 1987	1.87 m (6 ft 2 in)	Hapoel Jerusalem	(Israel)
PG	5	Afik Nissim	30 – 31 January 1981	1.86 m (6 ft 1 in)	ČEZ Nymburk	(Czech Republic)
PG	6	Yuval Naimi	26 – 31 August 1985	1.87 m (6 ft 2 in)	Hapoel Jerusalem	(Israel)
SF	7	David Blu	31 – 18 July 1980	2.01 m (6 ft 7 in)	Maccabi Tel Aviv	(Israel)
SF	8	Guy Pnini	27 – 4 September 1983	2.01 m (6 ft 7 in)	Maccabi Tel Aviv	(Israel)
PF	9	Gal Mekel	23 – 4 March 1988	1.90 m (6 ft 3 in)	Pallacanestro Treviso	(Italy)
SG	10	Tal Burstein (C)	31 – 19 February 1980	1.98 m (6 ft 6 in)	Maccabi Tel Aviv	(Israel)
PF	11	Lior Eliyahu	25 – 9 September 1985	2.07 m (6 ft 9 in)	Maccabi Tel Aviv	(Israel)
SG	12	Yotam Halperin	27 – 24 January 1984	1.96 m (6 ft 5 in)	Olympiacos	(Greece)
PF	13	Elishay Kadir	23 – 4 November 1987	2.03 m (6 ft 8 in)	Maccabi Haifa	(Israel)
C	14	Yaniv Green	31 – 16 May 1980	2.06 m (6 ft 9 in)	Maccabi Tel Aviv	(Israel)
PF	15	Uri Kukia	30 – 14 May 1981	2.02 m (6 ft 8 in)	Hapoel Jerusalem	(Israel)

Head coach

- (Israel) Arik Shivek

Assistant coach(es)

- (Israel) Oded Kattash
- (Israel) Dan Shamir

Legend

- (C) Team captain
- Age field is age on 31 August 2011

=== 2013 EuroBasket ===
Israel competed in the EuroBasket 2013, the 38th FIBA EuroBasket, Israel's 27th time competing, and finished 21st. Games were broadcast in Israel on Sport 5.

Qualifying round – Group A

Team	Pld	W	L	PF	PA	Diff	Pts	Tie-break
Montenegro	10	10	0	814	697	+117	20	
Israel	10	6	4	861	751	+90	16	2–2 (+26)
Serbia	10	6	4	846	721	+125	16	2–2 (+21)
Estonia	10	6	4	768	761	+7	16	2–2 (−47)
Iceland	10	1	9	743	920	−177	11	1–1 (+4)
Slovakia	10	1	9	704	886	−182	11	1–1 (−4)

15 August 2012
18:00

Report

Montenegro	75–69	Israel
Scoring by quarter: 17–20, 20–14, 11–22, 27–13
Pts: three players 12; Rebs: Šehović 11; Asts: Rochestie 5		Pts: Eliyahu 22; Rebs: Ohayon 10; Asts: Ohayon 4

Morača Sports Center, Podgorica
Attendance: 3,800
Referees: Sasa Pukl (SLO), Paolo Taurino (ITA), Elias Koromilas (GRE)

18 August 2012
21:00

Report

Israel	86–88 (OT)	Estonia
Scoring by quarter: 25–12, 15–15, 18–25, 17–23, Overtime: 11–13
Pts: Casspi 23; Rebs: Ohayon 9 Asts: Ohayon 7		Pts: Kangur 21; Rebs: Vene 10; Asts: Sokk 6

Bet Maccabi, Rishon LeZion
Attendance: 2,200
Referees: Sreten Radović (CRO), Sergey Mikhaylov (RUS), Sergiy Zashchuk (UKR)

21 August 2012
19:15

Report

Iceland	83–110	Israel
Scoring by quarter: 19–29, 17–21, 15–30, 32–30
Pts: Pálsson 19; Rebs: Baeringsson 8 Asts: Stefánsson 6		Pts: Limonad, Casspi 17; Rebs: Tyus 9 Asts: Ohayon 6

Laugardalshöll, Reykjavík
Attendance: 1,570
Referees: Joseph Bissang (FRA), Bert Van Slooten (NED), Simon Unsworth (ENG)

24 August 2012
18:00

Report

Slovakia	64–82	Israel
Scoring by quarter: 20–27, 15–20, 12–22, 17–13
Pts: Gavel 22; Rebs: Vido 6 Asts: Gavel 6		Pts: Tyus 18; Rebs: Tyus 7 Asts: Halperin 6

City Sport Hall, Levice
Attendance: 1,000
Referees: Grzegorz Ziemblicki (POL), Boris Schmidt (GER), Christoph Rohacky (AUT)

28 August 2012
20:30

Report

Israel	89–76	Serbia
Scoring by quarter: 25–15, 23–23, 17–18, 24–20
Pts: Casspi 23; Rebs: three players 7 Asts: Casspi 4		Pts: Teodosić, Erceg 10; Rebs: Erceg, Mačvan 5 Asts: Teodosić 4

Nokia Arena, Tel Aviv
Attendance: 9,000
Referees: Ivo Dolinek (CZE), Borys Ryzhyk (UKR), Anton Makhlin (RUS)

30 August 2012
20:30

Report

Israel	76–81	Montenegro
Scoring by quarter: 12–17, 25–14, 24–27, 15–23
Pts: Casspi 20; Rebs: Ohayon 7 Asts: Ohayon 8		Pts: Dašić 20; Rebs: Dubljević 10; Asts: Dašić 5

Nokia Arena, Tel Aviv
Attendance: 10,000
Referees: Miguel Perez Perez (ESP), Spyridon Gontas (GRE), Miroslav Tomov (BUL)

2 September 2012
20:00

Report

Estonia	53–84	Israel
Scoring by quarter: 13–21, 17–19, 10–19, 13–25
Pts: Talts 14; Rebs: Talts 10; Asts: Sokk 4		Pts: Casspi 26; Rebs: Eliyahu 11; Asts: Ohayon 7

Saku Suurhall Arena, Tallinn
Attendance: 6,950
Referees: Haydn Jones (WAL), Apostolos Kalpakas (SWE), Johannes Sarekoski (FIN)

5 September 2012
20:30

Report

Israel	92–75	Iceland
Scoring by quarter: 17–20, 25–18, 25–18, 25–19
Pts: Casspi 22; Rebs: Eliyahu 11; Asts: Eliyahu 5		Pts: Sigurðarson 21; Rebs: Baeringsson 11; Asts: Ermolinskij 7

Nokia Arena, Tel Aviv
Attendance: 4,000
Referees: Dubravko Muhvic (CRO), Antonis Demetriou (CYP), David Berekashvili (GEO)

8 September 2012
21:00

Report

Israel	106–73	Slovakia
Scoring by quarter: 23–19, 26–23, 32–8, 25–23
Pts: Eliyahu 18; Rebs: Tyus 11; Asts: Eliyahu 12		Pts: Vojtek 17; Rebs: Vojtek, Mrvis 4 Asts: Nuber 7

Nokia Arena, Tel Aviv
Attendance: 7,000
Referees: Paolo Taurino (ITA), Borys Shulga (UKR), Ilya Putenko (RUS)

11 September 2012
20:30

Report

Serbia	83–67	Israel
Scoring by quarter: 28–14, 23–17, 12–16, 20–20
Pts: Tepić 16; Rebs: Krstić 7 Asts: Teodosić 7		Pts: Casspi 20; Rebs: Kozikaro, Casspi 4 Asts: Casspi 4

Pionir Hall, Belgrade
Attendance: 6,150
Referees: Christos Christodoulou (GRE), Emilio Perez (ESP), Marek Cmikiewicz (POL)

Preliminary Round – Group A

4 September 2013
14:30

Boxscore

Israel	71–75 (OT)	Great Britain
Scoring by quarter: 17–22, 13–12, 22–13, 14–19, Overtime: 5–9
Pts: Nissim 17; Rebs: Eliyahu 14; Asts: Ohayon 7		Pts: Johnson 22; Rebs: Achara 13; Asts: Sullivan 2

Tivoli Hall, Ljubljana
Attendance: 750
Referees: Sreten Radović (CRO), Marek Ćmikiewicz (POL), David Berekashvili (GEO)

5 September 2013
14:30

Boxscore

Ukraine	74–67	Israel
Scoring by quarter: 19–13, 16–13, 18–20, 21–21
Pts: Gladyr 17; Rebs: Kravtsov 8 Asts: Mishula 5		Pts: Nissim 12; Rebs: Eliyahu 5 Asts: Halperin 4

Tivoli Hall, Ljubljana
Attendance: 790
Referees: Christos Christodoulou (GRE), Damir Javor (SLO), David Berekashvili (GEO)

6 September 2013
21:00

Boxscore

France	82–63	Israel
Scoring by quarter: 20–14, 18–15, 27–14, 17–20
Pts: Ajinça 13; Rebs: Ajinça 6 Asts: Parker 7		Pts: Eliyahu, Casspi 14; Rebs: Eliyahu 5 Asts: Ohayon 4

Tivoli Hall, Ljubljana
Attendance: 1,990
Referees: Christos Christodoulou (GRE), Vicente Bulto (ESP), Marek Cmkiewicz (POL)

8 September 2013
21:00

Boxscore

Israel	87–69	Belgium
Scoring by quarter: 19–15, 22–18, 32–13, 14–23
Pts: Nissim 23; Rebs: Ohayon 7 Asts: Eliyahu 6		Pts: De Zeeuw 14; Rebs: Hervelle 7 Asts: Van Rossom 5

Tivoli Hall, Ljubljana
Attendance: 1,010
Referees: Sreten Radović (CRO), Damir Javor (SLO), Rüştü Nuran (TUR)

9 September 2013
17:45

Boxscore

Germany	80–76	Israel
Scoring by quarter: 12–20, 19–10, 22–19, 27–27
Pts: Günther, Staiger 15; Rebs: Pleiß 14; Asts: Schaffartzik 4		Pts: Casspi 22; Rebs: Casspi 13; Asts: Ohayon, Halperin 4

Tivoli Hall, Ljubljana
Attendance: 2,940
Referees: Luigi Lamonica (ITA), Vicente Bulto (ESP), Petri Mäntylä (FIN)

Roster

Israel men's national basketball team roster
Players
Coaches

Pos.	No.	Name	Age – Date of birth	Height	Club	Ctr.
G	4	Raviv Limonad	29 – 26 August 1984	1.91 m (6 ft 3 in)	Hapoel Tel Aviv	(Israel)
G	5	Afik Nissim	32 – 31 January 1981	1.86 m (6 ft 1 in)	Hapoel Eilat	(Israel)
G/F	6	Nitzan Hanochi	27 – 10 June 1986	1.90 m (6 ft 3 in)	Hapoel Eilat	(Israel)
F	7	Alex Tyus	25 – 8 January 1988	2.03 m (6 ft 8 in)	Maccabi Tel Aviv	(Israel)
F	8	Lior Eliyahu	27 – 9 September 1985	2.07 m (6 ft 9 in)	Hapoel Jerusalem	(Israel)
F	9	Omri Casspi	25 – 22 June 1988	2.06 m (6 ft 9 in)	Houston Rockets	(United States)
F	10	Guy Pnini	30 – 4 September 1983	2.01 m (6 ft 7 in)	Maccabi Tel Aviv	(Israel)
G	11	Yogev Ohayon	26 – 24 April 1987	1.89 m (6 ft 2 in)	Maccabi Tel Aviv	(Israel)
G	12	Yotam Halperin	29 – 24 January 1984	1.96 m (6 ft 5 in)	Hapoel Jerusalem	(Israel)
C	13	Ido Kozikaro	35 – 8 January 1978	2.02 m (6 ft 8 in)	Maccabi Haifa	(Israel)
C	14	Yaniv Green	33 – 16 May 1980	2.06 m (6 ft 9 in)	Hapoel Jerusalem	(Israel)
F	15	Elishay Kadir	25 – 4 November 1987	2.03 m (6 ft 8 in)	Hapoel Jerusalem	(Israel)

Head coach

- (Israel) Arik Shivek

Assistant coach(es)

- (Israel) Eric Elfasi
- (Israel) Oded Kattash

Legend

- Club – describes last
  club before the tournament
- Age – describes age
  on 4 September 2013

=== 2015 EuroBasket ===
Israel competed in the EuroBasket 2015, the 39th FIBA EuroBasket, Israel's 28th time competing, and finished tenth. Games were broadcast in Israel on Sport 5.

Qualifying round – Group B

Team	Pld	W	L	PF	PA	PD	Pts	Tie
Israel	6	4	2	487	435	+52	10	2–0
Netherlands	6	4	2	378	374	+4	10	0–2
Montenegro	6	3	3	434	447	−13	9	
Bulgaria	6	1	5	400	443	−43	7	

10 August 2014
19:00

Boxscore

Israel	97–100 (OT)	Montenegro
Scoring by quarter: 20–17, 20–22, 18–27, 28–20, Overtime: 11–14
Pts: Casspi 28; Rebs: Casspi 10; Asts: Mekel 6		Pts: Rochestie 17; Rebs: Dragičević, Šehović 6 Asts: Rochestie 9

Eleftheria Indoor Hall, Nicosia, Cyprus
Attendance: 400
Referees: Fernando Rocha (POR), Elias Koromilas (GRE), Marius Ciulin (ROU)

13 August 2014
19:30

Boxscore

Netherlands	57–66	Israel
Scoring by quarter: 22–21, 19–24, 12–13, 4–8
Pts: Schaftenaar 12; Rebs: Oudendag 11; Asts: Slagter 7		Pts: Pnini 16; Rebs: Casspi 8 Asts: Mekel 5

MartiniPlaza, Groningen
Attendance: 1,200
Referees: Antonio Conde (ESP), Semen Ovinov (RUS), Haydn Jones (WAL)

17 August 2014
20:30

Boxscore

Bulgaria	84–100	Israel
Scoring by quarter: 22–29, 16–17, 20–34, 26–20
Pts: Vezenkov 18; Rebs: Varbanov 12; Asts: Marinov 5		Pts: Casspi 19; Rebs: Fischer 13; Asts: Mekel 7

Universiada Hall, Sofia
Attendance: 1,200
Referees: Benjamin Jiménez (ESP), Nikolaos Somos (GRE), Saša Maričić (SRB)

20 August 2014
21:00

Boxscore

Montenegro	65–80	Israel
Scoring by quarter: 20–20, 12–17, 19–24, 14–19
Pts: Dragičević 19; Rebs: Borisov 7 Asts: Rochestie 5		Pts: Casspi 17; Rebs: Mekel 11; Asts: Mekel 11

Morača Sports Center, Podgorica
Attendance: 4,100
Referees: Luigi Lamonica (ITA), Vicente Bulto (ESP), Panagiotis Anastopoulos (GRE)

24 August 2014
19:00

Boxscore

Israel	83–60	Netherlands
Scoring by quarter: 26–5, 22–18, 14–19, 21–18
Pts: Casspi 22; Rebs: Casspi 8 Asts: Mekel, Pnini 6		Pts: De Jong 15; Rebs: Oudendag 9 Asts: Williams 4

Eleftheria Indoor Hall, Nicosia, Cyprus
Attendance: 300
Referees: Alessandro Martolini (ITA), Oscar Perea (ESP), Charalampos Karakatsounis (GRE)

27 August 2014
20:45

Boxscore

Israel	61–69	Bulgaria
Scoring by quarter: 19–16, 22–12, 11–17, 9–24
Pts: Eliyahu 16; Rebs: Eliyahu 7 Asts: Pnini 6		Pts: Vezenkov 20; Rebs: Vezenkov 8 Asts: Avramov 4

Kition Athletic Center, Larnaca, Cyprus
Attendance: 100
Referees: Spyridon Gontas (GRE), Jurgis Laurinavicius (LTU), Tomislav Vovk (CRO)

Preliminary round – Group A

Pos	Team	Pld	W	L	PF	PA	PD	Pts	Qualification
1	France	5	5	0	407	335	+72	10	Advanced to Knockout stage
2	Israel	5	3	2	375	384	−9	8 (Note: Poland–Israel 73–75)	Advanced to Knockout stage
3	Poland	5	3	2	367	352	+15	8	Advanced to Knockout stage
4	Finland	5	2	3	387	392	−5	7	Advanced to Knockout stage
5	Russia	5	1	4	379	374	+5	6 (Note: Bosnia and Herzegovina–Russia 61–81)	
6	Bosnia and Herzegovina	5	1	4	324	402	−78	6	

Source: eurobasket2015.org
Rules for classification: 1) Points; 2) Head-to-head results; 3) Points difference; 4) Points scored.
Notes:

5 September 2015
17:30

Boxscore

Israel	76–73	Russia
Scoring by quarter: 18–21, 11–18, 21–10, 26–24
Pts: Casspi 21; Rebs: Casspi 9 Asts: Ohayon 5		Pts: Khvostov, Vorontsevich 15; Rebs: Vorontsevich 13; Asts: Khvostov, Vorontsevich 5

Park&Suites Arena, Montpellier
Referees: Matej Boltauzer (SLO), Siniša Herceg (CRO), Apostolos Kalpakas (SWE)

6 September 2015
17:30

Boxscore

Finland	66–79	Israel
Scoring by quarter: 13–25, 18–21, 23–16, 12–17
Pts: Murphy 24; Rebs: Murphy 9 Asts: Koponen 5		Pts: Eliyahu 22; Rebs: Fischer 11; Asts: Eliyahu 6

Park&Suites Arena, Montpellier
Referees: Fernando Rocha (POR), Spyridon Gontas (GRE), Renaud Geller (BEL)

7 September 2015
17:30

Boxscore

Israel	84–86 (OT)	Bosnia and Herzegovina
Scoring by quarter: 29–16, 16–19, 15–25, 15–15, Overtime: 9–11
Pts: Casspi 29; Rebs: Fischer 8 Asts: Mekel 7		Pts: Gordić 22; Rebs: Stipanović 18; Asts: Renfroe 8

Park&Suites Arena, Montpellier
Attendance: 6,288
Referees: Fernando Rocha (POR), Oļegs Latiševs (LAT), Anthonie Sinterniklaas (NED)

9 September 2015
17:30

Boxscore

Poland	73–75	Israel
Scoring by quarter: 24–22, 8–13, 18–16, 23–24
Pts: Kulig, Waczyński 13; Rebs: Gortat 8 Asts: Ponitka 6		Pts: Casspi 35; Rebs: Fischer 8 Asts: Limonad, Mekel 5

Park&Suites Arena, Montpellier
Referees: Matej Boltauzer (SLO), Spyridon Gontas (GRE), Igor Dragojević (MNE)

10 September 2015
21:00

Boxscore

Israel	61–86	France
Scoring by quarter: 10–22, 17–16, 21–24, 13–24
Pts: Limonad 13; Rebs: Kadir 9 Asts: three players 4		Pts: Gobert 15; Rebs: Gobert 10; Asts: De Colo, Parker 4

Park&Suites Arena, Montpellier
Attendance: 9,755
Referees: Oļegs Latiševs (LAT), Siniša Herceg (CRO), Igor Dragojević (MNE)

Round of 16

13 September 2015
18:30

Boxscore

Israel	52–82	Italy
Scoring by quarter: 13–22, 17–18, 9–28, 13–14
Pts: Mekel 20; Rebs: Casspi 6 Asts: three players 3		Pts: Gentile 27; Rebs: Melli 7 Asts: Cinciarini 5

Stade Pierre-Mauroy, Lille
Attendance: 14,742
Referees: Matej Boltauzer (SLO), Sreten Radović (CRO), Jurgis Laurinavičius (LTU)

Tournament highs

D'or Fischer finished in third place in the tournament for average blocks per game, with 1.8. Yogev Ohayon finished in second place in the tournament for average steals per game, with 1.7.

Roster

Israel men's national basketball team roster
Players
Coaches

Pos.	No.	Name	Age – Date of birth	Height	Club
SG	5	Dagan Yivzori	29 – 15 October 1985	1.93 m (6 ft 4 in)	Maccabi Tel Aviv	(Israel)
G/F	6	Shawn Dawson	21 – 12 December 1993	1.95 m (6 ft 5 in)	Maccabi Rishon LeZion	(Israel)
PG	7	Gal Mekel	27 – 4 March 1988	1.90 m (6 ft 3 in)	Crvena zvezda	(Serbia)
PF	8	Lior Eliyahu	29 – 9 September 1985	2.05 m (6 ft 9 in)	Hapoel Jerusalem	(Israel)
SF	9	Omri Casspi (C)	27 – 22 June 1988	2.06 m (6 ft 9 in)	Sacramento Kings	(United States)
SG	10	Raviv Limonad	31 – 26 August 1984	1.91 m (6 ft 3 in)	Hapoel Tel Aviv	(Israel)
PF	11	Elishay Kadir	27 – 4 November 1987	2.02 m (6 ft 8 in)	Hapoel Eilat	(Israel)
PG	12	Yogev Ohayon	28 – 24 April 1987	1.91 m (6 ft 3 in)	Maccabi Tel Aviv	(Israel)
C	14	Yaniv Green	35 – 16 May 1980	2.06 m (6 ft 9 in)	Hapoel Jerusalem	(Israel)
C	15	D'or Fischer	33 – 12 October 1981	2.11 m (6 ft 11 in)	Hapoel Jerusalem	(Israel)
C	16	Robert Rothbart	29 – 16 June 1986	2.17 m (7 ft 1 in)	Hapoel Tel Aviv	(Israel)
PG	23	Bar Timor	23 – 2 March 1992	1.91 m (6 ft 3 in)	Hapoel Jerusalem	(Israel)

Head coach

- (Israel) Erez Edelstein

Assistant coach(es)

- (Israel) Lior Lubin
- (Israel) Alon Stein

General Manager

- (Israel) Pini Gershon

Legend

- (C) Team captain
- Club – describes last
  club before the tournament
- Age – describes age
  on 5 September 2015

=== 2017 EuroBasket ===
Israel competed in the EuroBasket 2017, the 40th FIBA EuroBasket, Israel's 29th time competing.

In addition to competing, Israel was one of the hosts of the tournament. Following the decision to relocate the 2015 tournament, original hosts Ukraine were offered the chance to host the 2017 edition, but they declined, citing the ongoing unrest in the country. On 5 November 2015, FIBA Europe announced that five national federations had applied to organise the EuroBasket 2017: Finland, Israel, Poland, Romania and Turkey. On 11 December 2015, FIBA Europe announced that the tournament will be hosted by four countries: Israel, Romania, Finland and Turkey with the knockout stage host at the Sinan Erdem Dome in Istanbul.

Tel Aviv
Menora Mivtachim Arena
Capacity: 10,383

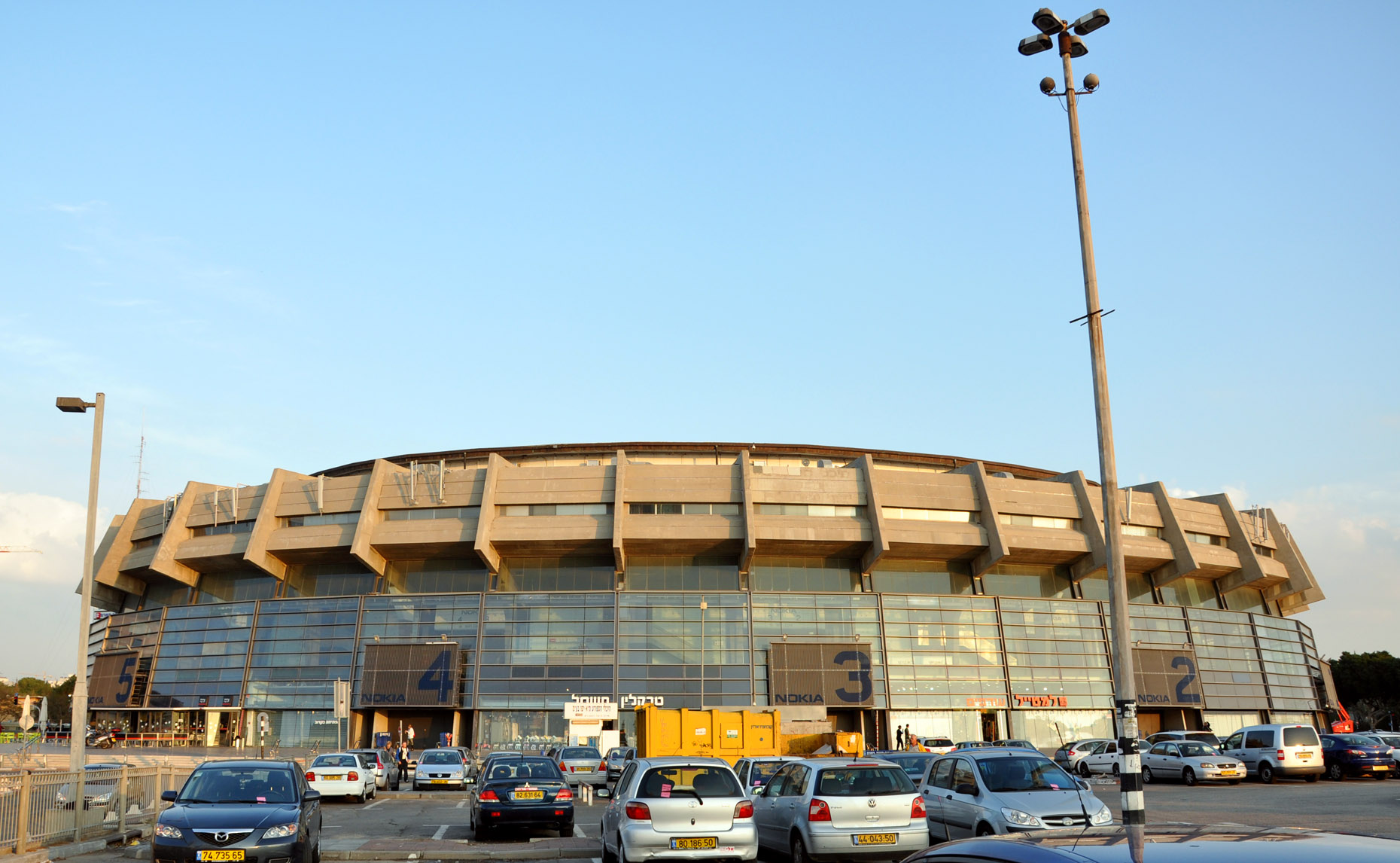

First round - Group B

Pos	Team	Pld	W	L	PF	PA	PD	Pts	Qualification
1	Lithuania	5	4	1	426	359	+67	9	Knockout stage
2	Germany	5	3	2	355	346	+9	8 (Note: Germany 61–55 Italy)	Knockout stage
3	Italy	5	3	2	346	322	+24	8	Knockout stage
4	Ukraine	5	2	3	367	392	−25	7 (Note: Ukraine 88–81 Georgia)	Knockout stage
5	Georgia	5	2	3	390	394	−4	7	
6	Israel (H)	5	1	4	358	429	−71	6	

Source: EuroBasket
Rules for classification: 1) Points; 2) Head-to-head results; 3) Points difference; 4) Points scored.
(H) Hosts
Notes:

The following is the squad in the EuroBasket 2017

Israel men's national basketball team – EuroBasket 2017 roster
Players
Coaches

Pos.	No.	Name	Age – Date of birth	Height	Club	Ctr.
C	1	Richard Howell	26 – 26 September 1990	2.03 m (6 ft 8 in)	Hapoel Jerusalem	(Israel)
G/F	6	Shawn Dawson	23 – 12 December 1993	1.98 m (6 ft 6 in)	Maccabi Rishon LeZion	(Israel)
PG	7	Gal Mekel	29 – 4 March 1988	1.91 m (6 ft 3 in)	Maccabi Tel Aviv	(Israel)
PF	8	Lior Eliyahu	31 – 9 September 1985	2.03 m (6 ft 8 in)	Hapoel Jerusalem	(Israel)
SF	9	Omri Casspi (C)	29 – 22 June 1988	2.06 m (6 ft 9 in)	Minnesota Timberwolves	(United States)
SF	10	Guy Pnini	33 – 4 September 1983	2.01 m (6 ft 7 in)	Maccabi Tel Aviv	(Israel)
PF	11	Elishay Kadir	29 – 4 November 1987	2.02 m (6 ft 8 in)	Maccabi Rishon LeZion	(Israel)
SG	12	Yotam Halperin	33 – 24 January 1984	1.93 m (6 ft 4 in)	Hapoel Jerusalem	(Israel)
PF	14	Oz Blayzer	24 – 29 December 1992	2.03 m (6 ft 8 in)	Maccabi Haifa	(Israel)
G	15	Bar Timor	25 – 2 March 1992	1.91 m (6 ft 3 in)	Hapoel Jerusalem	(Israel)
C	20	Idan Zalmanson	22 – 18 April 1995	2.06 m (6 ft 9 in)	Maccabi Rishon LeZion	(Israel)
PG	21	Yogev Ohayon	30 – 24 April 1987	1.89 m (6 ft 2 in)	Maccabi Tel Aviv	(Israel)

Head coach

- (Israel) Erez Edelstein

Assistant coach(es)

- (Israel) Dan Shamir
- (Israel) Alon Stein
- (Israel) Modi Maor
- (Israel) Avi Kowalski

General Manager

- (Israel) Pini Gershon

Legend

- (C) Team captain
- Club – describes last
  club before the tournament
- Age – describes age
  on 31 August 2017

== See also ==
- Israel national basketball team#Past rosters
