= Shimon Amsalem =

Israeli basketball player (born 1966)

Shimon Amsalem שמעון אמסלם
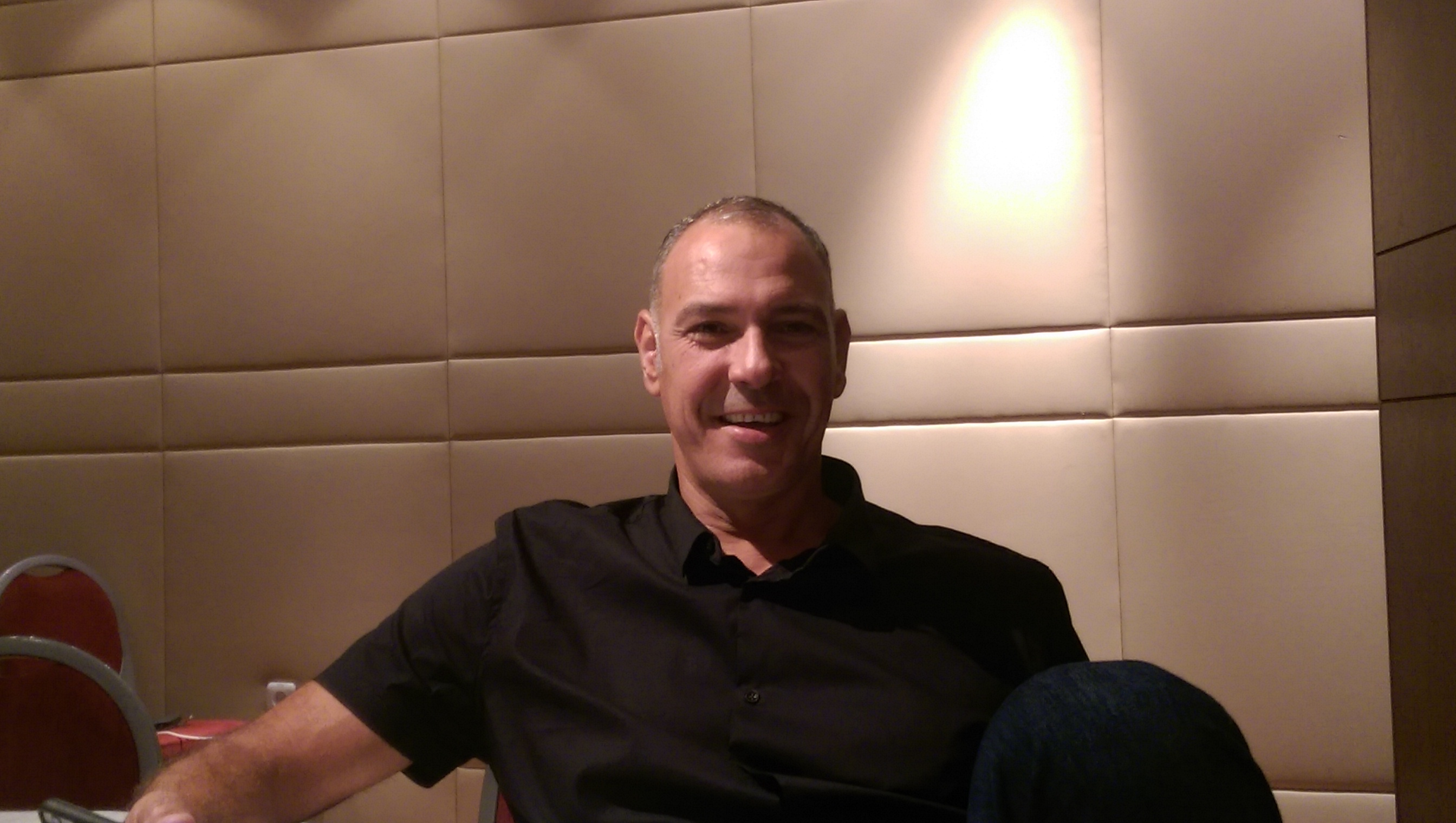

Personal information
- Born: November 10, 1966 (age 60) Sderot, Israel
- Listed height: 2.04 m (6 ft 8 in)
- Positions: Forward and center

Shimon Yaakov Amsalem (Hebrew: שמעון אמסלם; born November 10, 1966) is an Israeli former basketball player. He played the forward and center positions. He played in the Israeli Premier Basketball League and for the Israeli National Basketball Team.

== Biography ==
Amsalem is from Sderot, Israel, and is 2.04 m (6 ft 8 in) tall. He played in the Israeli Premier Basketball League for Hapoel Tel Aviv, Hapoel Haifa, Hapoel Eilat, Bnei Herzelia, and Elitzur Givat Shmuel. He also played for the Israeli National Basketball Team in the 1992 European Olympic Qualifying Tournament for Men, 1993 European Championship for Men, 1995 European Championship for Men, and 1999 European Championship for Men.

His son Loten was a high school basketball player, and played on the team that won the 2019 High School Basketball World Championship.
