= Papi Turgeman =

Israeli basketball player (born 1970)

Shalom Charly "Papi" Turgeman פפי תורג'מן
Personal information
- Born: April 7, 1970 (age 56) Jerusalem
- Listed height: 6 ft 5 in (1.96 m)
- Listed weight: 190 lb (86 kg)
- Position: Guard

Career highlights
- Israel Premier League Assists Leader (1995)

Shalom Charly "Papi" Turgeman (Hebrew: פפי תורג'מן; born April 7, 1970) is an Israeli former basketball player. He played in the Israel Basketball Premier League and the Euroleague and was Captain of the Israel national basketball team. In 1995 he was the Israel Premier League Assists Leader.

== Basketball career ==
Turgeman is 6 ft 5 in (1.96 metres) tall and weighs 190 pounds (86 kg), and played at the guard position. His hometown is Jerusalem, Israel.

He played in the Israel Basketball Premier League and the Euroleague. Turgeman played for a decade for Hapoel Jerusalem. In 1995 he was the Israel Premier League Assists Leader, with 6.5 per game.

Turgeman also played for the Israel national basketball team, and was its Team Captain. He played in the FIBA 1997 European Championship for Men, FIBA 1999 European Championship for Men, FIBA 2001 European Championship for Men, and FIBA 2003 European Championship for Men.
