= Doron Sheffer =

Israeli basketball player (born 1972)

Doron Sheffer דורון שפר
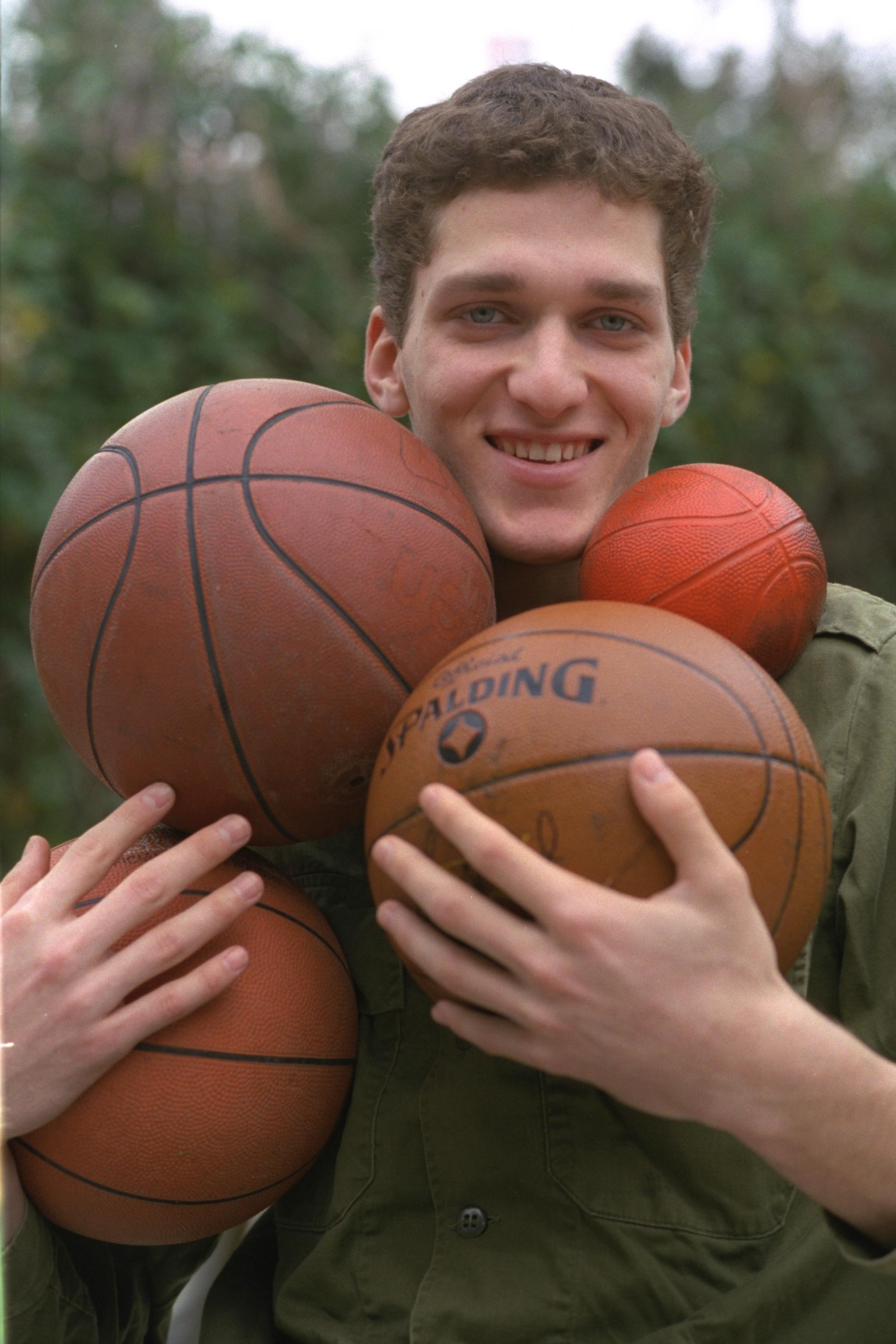
- Sheffer in 1993

Personal information
- Born: 12 March 1972 (age 54) Ramat Efal, Israel
- Listed height: 6 ft 5 in (1.96 m)
- Listed weight: 200 lb (91 kg)

Career information
- College: UConn (1993–1996)
- NBA draft: 1996: 2nd round, 36th overall pick
- Drafted by: Los Angeles Clippers
- Playing career: 1990–2014
- Position: Point guard / shooting guard

Career history
- 1990–1993: Hapoel Galil Elyon
- 1996–2000, 2002–2003: Maccabi Tel Aviv
- 2003–2005: Hapoel Jerusalem
- 2005–2006: Hapoel Tel Aviv
- 2006–2008: Hapoel Galil Elyon
- 2013–2014: Elitzor Petah Tikva\Givaataim

Career highlights
- FIBA EuroStar (1998); EuroCup champion (2004); 6× Israeli League champion (1993, 1997–2000, 2003); 5× Israeli Cup winner (1992, 1998–2000, 2003); Third-team All-American – UPI (1996); Big East Rookie of the Year (1994)
- Stats at Basketball Reference

Doron Sheffer (Hebrew: דורון שפר; born 12 March 1972) is an Israeli former professional basketball player. He spent most of his club career playing with Maccabi Tel Aviv. During his playing career he played at the point guard and shooting guard positions. During his playing days, his nickname was "The Iceman".

== Early career ==
Sheffer attended Tichon Hadash high school in Tel Aviv. Sheffer first gained fame at age 21, in the Israeli Premier League, when he led Hapoel Galil Elyon to a victory in the Israeli League semifinals, over powerhouse Maccabi Tel Aviv, in 1993.

== College career ==
Following fellow Israeli Nadav Henefeld, Sheffer then played college basketball, under head coach Jim Calhoun, at the University of Connecticut, with the UConn Huskies, from 1993 to 1996. In the 1993–94 season, Sheffer was the Big East Conference Rookie of the Year. While at UConn, Sheffer formed a trio with fellow starters Ray Allen and Kevin Ollie, that won the Big East basketball championship in three straight years. He is the only player from UConn with 1,000 points and 500 assists, in three varsity seasons.

He was named to the school's All-20th Century team.

== Professional career ==
Sheffer was selected in the 1996 NBA draft, by the Los Angeles Clippers, with the 36th overall pick, but he chose to sign with Maccabi Tel Aviv. After four years with Maccabi, where he won four straight Israeli League championships and played in the 2000 EuroLeague Final Four, Sheffer retired suddenly, walking away from the public's eye, to travel the world, to India, South America, and Costa Rica. During this time, he had a cancerous tumor removed from his testes.

Despite the illness, and the time away from basketball, Sheffer decided to make a comeback. After finishing his contract with Maccabi, he signed with Hapoel Jerusalem. In 2004, he won the ULEB Eurocup (EuroCup) championship with Hapoel. Sheffer retired again in 2005, and then made another comeback in 2006. He then retired again in 2008. 5 years later, in 2013, he made a final comeback to the game, before finally retiring in 2014.

== National team career ==
Sheffer was a member of the senior Israeli national basketball team. With Israel, he played at the 1993 EuroBasket, the 1995 EuroBasket, the 1997 EuroBasket, and the 1999 EuroBasket.
