= Lior Arditti =

Israeli basketball player (born 1967)

Lior Arditti ליאור ארדיטי
Personal information
- Born: December 16, 1967 (age 58) Rehovot, Israel
- Listed height: 6 ft 5 in (1.96 m)
- Listed weight: 209 lb (95 kg)

Career information
- College: Boston College (1989–1991)
- Position: Guard
Medals
Men's basketball
Representing Israel
Maccabiah Games
Gold medal – first place	1989 Tel Aviv	Team

Lior Arditti (also "Arditty" and "Arditi"; Hebrew: ליאור ארדיטי; born December 16, 1977) is an Israeli former basketball player. He played the guard position. He played in the Israel Basketball Premier League for Team Israel in the 1989 Maccabiah Games, winning a gold medal. He also competed in the Israel Basketball Premier League, and for the Israeli national basketball team.

== Biography ==
Arditti was born in Rehovot, Israel, lived in Herzliya, and is Jewish. His parents are Alex and Hana Arditti, and he has two younger sisters Dorit and Yael. He is 6 ft 5 in (196 cm) tall, and weighs 209 pounds (95 kg). He served three years in the Israel Defense Forces before going to college.

He played for Team Israel in the 1989 Maccabiah Games, winning a gold medal.

Arditti attended Boston College ('91). Under NCAA age rules, he was limited to two years of eligibility. He played for the Boston College Eagles from 1989 to 1991, his freshman and sophomore years. In the second game of his college career, he scored 21 points against Dartmouth College on November 27, 1989. In 1989-90 he led the team with an .823 free throw percentage and a .456 three-point field goal percentage.

He played in the Israel Basketball Premier League. Arditti competed from 1983 to 2001 for Israeli teams Maccabi Southern Tel Aviv, Maccabi Tel Aviv, Maccabi Ramat Gan, Hapoel Eilat, Hapoel Tel Aviv, Bnei Herzliya Basket, Hapoel Galil Elyon, and Maccabi Ra'anana.

Arditti played for the Israeli national basketball team. He played in the 1993 FIBA European Championship for Men, 1995 FIBA European Championship for Men, 1997 FIBA European Championship for Men, and 1999 FIBA European Championship for Men.

After playing basketball, Arditti became a real estate businessman, and co-owned the Heiblum-Arditti Group.
