= Amir Muchtari =

Israeli basketball player

Amir Muchtari אמיר מוכתרי
Personal information
- Born: June 12, 1972 (age 54) Kfar Saba, Israel

Career highlights
- Israeli Basketball Premier League Quintet (2000)

Amir Muchtari (Hebrew: אמיר מוכתרי; born June 12, 1972) is an Israeli former basketball player. He was named to the 2000 Israeli Basketball Premier League Quintet.

== Biography ==
Muchtari was born in Kfar Saba, Israel.

He played for Hapoel Jerusalem, Hapoel Galil Elyon, and Bnei Herzliya Basket. Muchtari was named to the 2000 Israeli Basketball Premier League Quintet.

Muchtari also played for the Israel men's national basketball team.

After his retirement he entered the real estate business, however his real estate group collapsed in 2020.
