= Israel men's national basketball team =

Men's national basketball team representing Israel

Israel
- FIBA ranking: 29 (1 September 2026)
- Joined FIBA: 1939; 87 years ago
- FIBA zone: FIBA Europe
- National federation: IBBA
- Coach: Ariel Beit-Halahmy
- Nickname(s): הכחולים-לבנים (The Blue and Whites)

Olympic Games
- Appearances: 1
- Medals: None

FIBA World Cup
- Appearances: 2
- Medals: None

EuroBasket
- Appearances: 31
- Medals: (silver) Silver: (1979)

Asian Games
- Appearances: 3
- Medals: (gold) Gold: (1966, 1974); (silver) Silver: (1970)
Home	Away

First international
- Philippines 57–47 Israel (Helsinki, Finland; 14 July 1952)

Biggest win
- Israel 116–64 Albania (Granada, Spain; 26 June 1992)

Biggest defeat
- Soviet Union 90–44 Israel (Istanbul, Turkey; 24 May 1959)

The Israel men's national basketball team (Hebrew: נבחרת ישראל בכדורסל) represents Israel in international basketball tournaments. They are administered by the Israeli Basketball Association. Israel is currently ranked 29th in the FIBA World Ranking.

Israel has qualified for the EuroBasket 31 times throughout their history. They have also made two appearances at the World Cup, and one at the Summer Olympics. Israel also participated at the Asian Games from 1966 to 1974. The most success Israel has had on the international stage to date, is finishing as the runners-up at EuroBasket 1979, as well as winning two gold medals (1966, 1974), and one silver medal (1970) at the Asian Games.

== History ==
=== 1952 Olympic Games ===
The Israeli national team played in their first international competition at the 1952 Olympic Games. However, the team would quickly be ousted in the preliminary tournament, with a (0–2) record and losses to the Philippines, and Greece.

=== EuroBasket 1953 ===
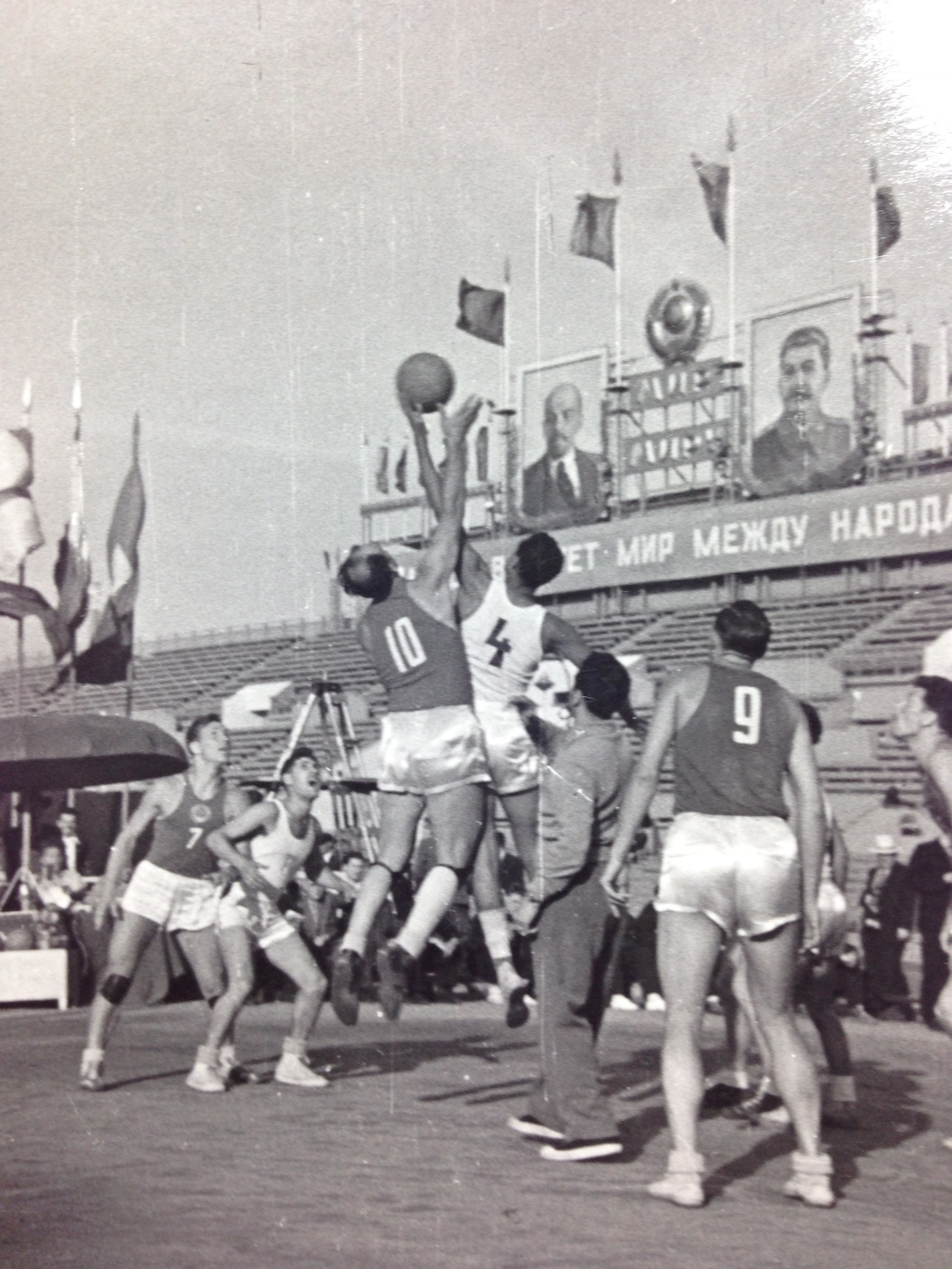
European Cup, Moscow 1953. Zacharia Ofri (#4, Israel) tipping off the ball

Israel made their European Basketball Championship debut at EuroBasket 1953 in Moscow. In the preliminary round, the Israeli squad won their group by tie-breaker after being one of three teams to finish with a (3–1) record. They then advanced to the final round, managing to defeat perennial power Czechoslovakia, and getting revenge on Yugoslavia for their only preliminary round loss. Their record in the final round was (4–3), putting them in a 4-way tie for second place behind the undefeated Soviet Union. Israel eventually came out on the bottom of that tie-breaker, finishing in 5th place of the 17 teams.

Israel's overall record of seven wins and four losses included two wins by forfeit over Lebanon (in the preliminary round) and Egypt (in the final round), each of which had refused to play against Israel due to political reasons.

=== 1954 World Cup ===
Israel reached the World Cup for the first time in 1954. The national team would be placed in Group D in the preliminary round, where they would finish in a 3-way tie, after splitting their two games. They would ultimately secure a spot in the final round based on point difference. There Israel would be overwhelmed, as they dropped six of their seven matches to accumulate a (1–6) record, with their only win coming in a 48–45 overtime victory against France. Israel would end their inaugural appearance at the tournament in eighth place.

=== 1966 Asian Games ===
Israel appeared at the Asian Games for the first time in 1966. Being drawn into Group B in the preliminary round of the tournament, the national team throttled Iran in the first game 87–55. After that result, Israel would go on to finish out the rest of the round with a (4–1) record, to move on. In the semi-finals, Israel breezed passed Japan 57–34 to reach the title game. In the final, Israel capped their run through the competition by dismantling Thailand 90–42 to capture their first gold medal at the Asian Games.

=== 1970 Asian Games ===
Heading into the 1970 Asian Games, Israel looked to repeat their performance from 1966. Israel swept their preliminary phase opponents to make it to the final stage. Sitting at (3–0), Israel looked dominant in their first three wins, and appeared poised to become back-to-back Asian Games champions. After winning their first seven games of the final round, Israel needed one more win to finish with a flawless record, and take home the gold. However, South Korea prevented it all from happening, defeating Israel convincingly 81–67. The result landed the team into a second-place finish overall.

=== 1974 Asian Games ===
The 1974 Asian Games would be the final appearance for Israel at the tournament. The team looked to achieve the gold medal once more before departing. Israel easily made it through the first two rounds to a (3–0) record, setting up a clash in the semi-finals. There the team went up against the Philippines, and outlasted them in a high scoring affair 123–101, to reach the final. In the title game South Korea awaited Israel once again, who was determined to avenge their lost to them at the prior Asian Games in 1970. This time around Israel would come out as champions, winning a hard-fought tussle 92–85 to reclaim the gold medal one last time.

=== EuroBasket 1979 ===
The EuroBasket 1979 was the 12th appearance for Israel at the European Basketball Championship. The team began their tournament journey with an opening phase defeat against France. Although the team would refocus, and win their next two matches against Poland, and Yugoslavia. The (2–1) record the team achieved was enough to advance to the final stage of the competition. There, the team won three out of their five games to finish in second place in the group, only behind the Soviet Union. This result gave Israel their first medal finish at the tournament.

=== 1986 World Cup ===
Israel qualified for their second World Cup appearance in 1986. The national team was drawn into Group B in the preliminary phase. Their first game of the tournament was a 79–84 win against Uruguay. Israel would go on to attain second place in group play with a (3–2) record, to move on to the next round. However, Israel was not as successful in this phase, as they would finish up with a losing record (2–3) to be relegated to the classification round. There they went (1–1) to come in 7th place at the competition overall.

=== EuroBasket 2017 ===
Israel won the rights to be one of four co-hosts for EuroBasket 2017. With Israel hosting Group B in Tel Aviv, the team went up against Italy in their first game, and were thoroughly dominated in a 69–48 defeat. Heading into their second game of the tournament, Israel had Lithuania standing in their way. Israel ran out to an early first period lead, but the team could not maintain the momentum, as they fell to (0–2), and desperately needing a win in their next game. Germany was the opponent for the national team in their third match of group play, and they were victorious in a remarkable 80–82 win. Sitting with a (1–2) record, Israel were intent on getting a win versus Georgia. However, even behind the strong performance from Gal Mekel, his 23 points were not enough. Israel would lose a heartbreaker in overtime 91–104. Their last game of group play, and positions nearly determined, Israel would fall once more. This time at the hands of Ukraine, 88–64, to end the tournament with a (1–4) record.

=== 2019 World Cup qualification ===
During the process for Israel to reach the 2019 World Cup, the team went through World Cup qualifiers, where they were drawn into Group H for the first round of qualifiers. Israel's first game was a comfortable 88–68 win at home against Estonia. Heading to play Greece on the road in their next game, the team looked to move to (2–0). Although Greece would have none of it, as they dominated Israel 82–61, dropping the team to a record of (1–1). Israel would eventually get things on track, as they finished the rest of group play at (3–3), enough to advance to the second and final round of qualifying.

For the second round of World Cup qualifying, Israel was placed into Group L. Their first two matches of group play were tough losses against Georgia, and Germany. Although they eventually picked up an impressive win in their third game at home versus Serbia. Unfortunately, the national team would only earn one more victory during the rest of the qualifiers, which saw their hopes at (5–7) and clinching qualification vanish.

== Honours ==
Medals table

Event	W	L	Per.	1st place, gold medalist(s)	2nd place, silver medalist(s)	3rd place, bronze medalist(s)	T
Summer Olympic Games	0	2	.000	0	0	0	0
FIBA World Cup	7	11	.389	0	0	0	0
EuroBasket	77	113	.405	0	1	0	1
Asian Games	19	2	.905	2	1	0	3
Total	103	128	.455	2	2	0	4

== Competitive record ==
=== FIBA World Cup ===
World Cup					Qualification			
Year	Position	Pld	W	L	Pos	Pld	W	L
(Argentina) 1950	Did not enter				Did not enter			
(Brazil) 1954	8th	9	2	7	Directly qualified			
(Chile) 1959	Did not enter				Did not enter			
(Brazil) 1963	Did not qualify				EuroBasket served as qualifiers			
(Uruguay) 1967	Did not qualify				EuroBasket served as qualifiers			
(Socialist Federal Republic of Yugoslavia) 1970	Did not qualify				EuroBasket served as qualifiers			
(Puerto Rico) 1974	Did not qualify				EuroBasket served as qualifiers			
(Philippines) 1978	Did not qualify				EuroBasket served as qualifiers			
(Colombia) 1982	Did not qualify				EuroBasket served as qualifiers			
(Spain) 1986	7th	10	5	5	Q	6	5	1
(Argentina) 1990	Did not qualify				EuroBasket served as qualifiers			
(Canada) 1994	Did not qualify				EuroBasket served as qualifiers			
(Greece) 1998	Did not qualify				EuroBasket served as qualifiers			
(United States) 2002	Did not qualify				EuroBasket served as qualifiers			
(Japan) 2006	Did not qualify				EuroBasket served as qualifiers			
(Turkey) 2010	Did not qualify				EuroBasket served as qualifiers			
(Spain) 2014	Did not qualify				EuroBasket served as qualifiers			
(China) 2019	Did not qualify				5th	12	5	7
(Philippines) (Japan) (Indonesia) 2023	Did not qualify				5th	12	4	8
(Qatar) 2027	To be determined				In progress			
(France) 2031	To be determined				To be determined			
Total	2/19	19	7	12		30	14	16

=== Olympic Games ===
Olympic Games					Qualifying		
Year	Position	Pld	W	L	Pld	W	L
(United Kingdom) 1948	Did not enter						
(Finland) 1952	20th	2	0	2			
(Australia) 1956	Did not qualify						
(Italy) 1960	Did not qualify				7	3	4
(Japan) 1964	Did not qualify				8	4	4
(Mexico) 1968	Did not qualify				8	3	5
(West Germany) 1972	Did not qualify				7	4	3
(Canada) 1976	Did not qualify				10	4	6
(Soviet Union) 1980	Did not qualify				10	6	4
(United States) 1984	Did not qualify				9	3	6
(South Korea) 1988	Did not qualify				3	1	2
(Spain) 1992	Did not qualify				12	5	7
(United States) 1996	Did not qualify				Did not qualify		
(Australia) 2000	Did not qualify				Did not qualify		
(Greece) 2004	Did not qualify				Did not qualify		
(China) 2008	Did not qualify				Did not qualify		
(United Kingdom) 2012	Did not qualify				Did not qualify		
(Brazil) 2016	Did not qualify				Did not qualify		
(Japan) 2020	Did not qualify				Did not qualify		
(France) 2024	Did not qualify				4	2	2
(United States) 2028	To be determined				To be determined		
Total	1/20	2	0	2	78	35	43

=== Asian Games ===
Asian Games
Year	Position	Pld	W	L
(Thailand) 1966	1st place, gold medalist(s)	7	6	1
(Thailand) 1970	2nd place, silver medalist(s)	8	7	1
(Iran) 1974	1st place, gold medalist(s)	6	6	0
Total		21	19	2

=== EuroBasket ===
EuroBasket					Qualification			
Year	Position	Pld	W	L	Pos	Pld	W	L
(Lithuania) 1939	Did not enter							
(Switzerland) 1946	Did not enter							
(Czechoslovakia) 1947	Did not enter							
(Egypt) 1949	Did not enter							
(France) 1951	Did not enter							
(Soviet Union) 1953	5th	11	7	4				
(Hungary) 1955	Did not enter							
(Bulgaria) 1957	Did not enter							
(Turkey) 1959	11th	8	3	5				
(Socialist Federal Republic of Yugoslavia) 1961	11th	7	2	5				
(Poland) 1963	9th	9	4	5	Directly qualified			
(Soviet Union) 1965	6th	9	5	4		3	2	1
(Finland) 1967	8th	9	4	5		3	2	1
(Italy) 1969	11th	7	1	6		4	3	1
(West Germany) 1971	11th	7	1	6		3	2	1
(Spain) 1973	7th	7	3	4		11	10	1
(Socialist Federal Republic of Yugoslavia) 1975	7th	7	5	2		Directly qualified		
(Belgium) 1977	5th	7	4	3		Directly qualified		
(Italy) 1979	2nd place, silver medalist(s)	9	5	4		Directly qualified		
(Czechoslovakia) 1981	6th	8	3	5		Directly qualified		
(France) 1983	6th	7	3	4		Directly qualified		
(West Germany) 1985	9th	7	3	4		Directly qualified		
(Greece) 1987	11th	7	2	5		12	10	2
(Socialist Federal Republic of Yugoslavia) 1989	Did not qualify					3	2	1
(Italy) 1991	Did not qualify				DNQ	10	5	5
(Germany) 1993	15th	3	1	2	1st	6	5	1
(Greece) 1995	9th	6	2	4	2nd	6	5	1
(Spain) 1997	9th	8	4	4	3rd	10	6	4
(France) 1999	9th	6	2	4	2nd	10	7	3
(Turkey) 2001	10th	4	1	3	1st	10	8	2
(Sweden) 2003	7th	7	3	4	3rd	10	5	5
(Serbia and Montenegro) 2005	9th	4	2	2	Q	12	9	3
(Spain) 2007	11th	6	2	4	Q	14	9	5
(Poland) 2009	15th	3	0	3	2nd	6	3	3
(Lithuania) 2011	13th	5	2	3	2nd	8	5	3
(Slovenia) 2013	21st	5	1	4	2nd	10	6	4
(France) (Croatia) (Germany) (Latvia) 2015	10th	6	3	3	1st	6	4	2
(Finland) (Israel) (Romania) (Turkey) 2017	21st	5	1	4	Qualified as co-host			
(Czech Republic) (Georgia (country)) (Italy) (Germany) 2022	17th	5	2	3	1st	6	5	1
(Cyprus) (Finland) (Poland) (Latvia) 2025	14th	6	3	3	1st	6	5	1
(Estonia) (Greece) (Slovenia) (Spain) 2029	To be determined				To be determined			
Total	31/40	205	84	121		169	118	51

== Results and fixtures ==
Win Loss

=== 2025 ===
28 November 2025 2027 FIBA World Cup qualifiers – 1st round	Germany	89–69	Israel	Neu-Ulm, Germany
19:30 (UTC+1)	Scoring by quarter: 26–22, 24–9, 19–22, 20–16
	Pts: O. Da Silva 19; Rebs: Bonga 10; Asts: Hollatz 6	Boxscore	Pts: Sorkin 18; Rebs: Sorkin, Zoosman 7 Asts: Timor 4	Arena: Ratiopharm Arena; Attendance: 6,049; Referees: Boris Krejić (SVN), Valentin Oliot (FRA), Zafer Yılmaz (TUR)

1 December 2025 2027 FIBA World Cup qualifiers – 1st round	Israel	71–85	Croatia	Riga, Latvia* (Note: Due to continued security concerns from the Gaza war, Israel's home match in December 2025 was played at a neutral site.)
21:00 (UTC+2)	Scoring by quarter: 25–25, 17–22, 14–24, 15–14
	Pts: Sorkin 20; Rebs: Zoosman 6 Asts: Huber 6	Boxscore	Pts: Ružić 23; Rebs: Hezonja 13; Asts: Smith 6	Arena: Xiaomi Arena; Attendance: 45; Referees: Gvidas Gedvilas (LTU), Michał Proć (POL), Tolga Edis (TUR)

=== 2026 ===
27 February 2026 2027 FIBA World Cup qualifiers – 1st round	Israel	94–54	Cyprus	Limassol, Cyprus* (Note: Due to continued security concerns from the Gaza war, Israel's home match in February 2026 was played at a neutral site.)
21:00 (UTC+2)	Scoring by quarter: 32–15, 26–8, 13–16, 23–15
	Pts: Madar 22; Rebs: Zalmanson 8 Asts: Zalmanson 6	Boxscore	Pts: F. Tigkas 12; Rebs: Koumis 7 Asts: Michail 4	Arena: Spyros Kyprianou Athletic Center; Referees: Mihkel Männiste (EST), Gintaras Mačiulis (LTU), Viola Györgyi (NOR)

1 March 2026 2027 FIBA World Cup qualifiers – 1st round	Cyprus	54–83	Israel	Limassol, Cyprus
19:00 (UTC+2)	Scoring by quarter: 12–24, 17–21, 13–23, 12–15
	Pts: F. Tigkas 15; Rebs: Koumis 8 Asts: Varsos 4	Boxscore	Pts: three players 13; Rebs: Sorkin 11; Asts: Carrington 6	Arena: Spyros Kyprianou Athletic Center; Attendance: 800; Referees: Marius Ciulin (ROU), Valentin Oliot (FRA), Silvia Marziali (ITA)

3 July 2026 2027 FIBA World Cup qualifiers – 1st round	Israel	86–92	Germany	Riga, Latvia* (Note: Due to continued security concerns from the Iran war, Israel's home match in July 2026 was played at a neutral site.)
20:00 (UTC+3)	Scoring by quarter: 15–23, 22–22, 18–31, 31–16
	Pts: Madar 31; Rebs: Ginat 8 Asts: Ginat 7	Boxscore	Pts: Schröder 20; Rebs: Sengfelder 6 Asts: Schröder 9	Arena: Xiaomi Arena; Attendance: 100; Referees: Alberto Sánchez (ESP), Elvis Binders-Čoders (LAT), Ariadna Chueca (ESP)

6 July 2026 2027 FIBA World Cup qualifiers – 1st round	Croatia	103–75	Israel	Osijek, Croatia
20:00 (UTC+2)	Scoring by quarter: 25–12, 22–19, 27–20, 29–24
	Pts: Zubac 18; Rebs: Šarić 13; Asts: Šarić 7	Boxscore	Pts: Madar 21; Rebs: Palatin 6 Asts: Madar, Palatin 5	Arena: Gradski vrt Hall; Attendance: 2,788; Referees: Martin Horozov (BUL), Geert Jacobs (BEL), Juozas Barkauskas (LTU)

27 August 2026 2027 FIBA World Cup qualifiers – 2nd round	Israel	86–106	Poland	Riga, Latvia* (Note: Due to continued security concerns from the Iran war, Israel's home match in August 2026 was played at a neutral site.)
21:00 (UTC+3)	Scoring by quarter: 15–23, 27–32, 18–25, 26–26
	Pts: Sorkin 26; Rebs: Segev, Sorkin 5 Asts: Blatt 10	Boxscore	Pts: Ponitka 24; Rebs: Sokołowski 7 Asts: Ponitka 9	Arena: Xiaomi Arena; Attendance: 100; Referees: Petar Pešić (SRB), Mihkel Männist (EST), Andrea Bongiorni (ITA)

30 August 2026 2027 FIBA World Cup qualifiers – 2nd round	Latvia	85–70	Israel	Riga, Latvia
19:00 (UTC+3)	Scoring by quarter: 21–22, 20–19, 26–17, 18–12
	Pts: Strautiņš 29; Rebs: Čavars 9 Asts: Lomažs 6	Boxscore	Pts: Madar 15; Rebs: Segev 7 Asts: Madar 5	Arena: Xiaomi Arena; Attendance: 10,321; Referees: Luis Castillo (ESP), Ventsislav Velikov (BUL), Viola Györgyi (NOR)

27 November 2026 2027 FIBA World Cup qualifiers – 2nd round	Netherlands	vs.	Israel	The Hague, Netherlands
20:00 (UTC+1)
		Boxscore		Arena: Sportcampus Zuiderpark

30 November 2026 2027 FIBA World Cup qualifiers – 2nd round	Israel	vs.	Latvia	Riga, Latvia* (Note: Due to continued security concerns from the Iran war, Israel's home match in November 2026 will be played at a neutral site.)
19:30 (UTC+2)
		Boxscore		Arena: Xiaomi Arena

=== 2027 ===
25 February 2027 2027 FIBA World Cup qualifiers – 2nd round	Poland	vs.	Israel	Poland
--:-- (UTC+1)
		Boxscore

28 February 2027 2027 FIBA World Cup qualifiers – 2nd round	Israel	vs.	Netherlands	Israel
--:-- (UTC+2)
		Boxscore

== Team ==
=== Current roster ===
Roster for the 2027 FIBA World Cup Qualifiers matches on 27 and 30 August 2026 against Poland and Latvia.

Israel men's national basketball team roster
Players
Coaches

Pos.	No.	Name	Age – Date of birth	Height	Club	Ctr.
G/F	1	Adam Ariel	31 – 10 December 1994	1.92 m (6 ft 4 in)	Ironi Ness Ziona	(Israel)
SG	3	Khadeen Carrington	30 – 3 October 1995	1.93 m (6 ft 4 in)	Hapoel Tel Aviv	(Israel)
C	6	Itay Segev	31 – 15 June 1995	2.06 m (6 ft 9 in)	Hapoel Tel Aviv	(Israel)
C	9	Roman Sorkin	30 – 11 August 1996	2.08 m (6 ft 10 in)	Maccabi Tel Aviv	(Israel)
SF	10	Lior Carreira	29 – 14 August 1997	1.97 m (6 ft 6 in)	Maccabi Ironi Ramat Gan	(Israel)
PG	11	Yam Madar	25 – 21 December 2000	1.90 m (6 ft 3 in)	Maccabi Tel Aviv	(Israel)
SF	12	Rafi Menco	32 – 5 March 1994	2.00 m (6 ft 7 in)	Hapoel Gilboa Galil	(Israel)
PF	21	Netanel Artzi	29 – 21 March 1997	2.00 m (6 ft 7 in)	Hapoel Holon	(Israel)
SG	33	Yair Kravits	27 – 3 March 1999	1.93 m (6 ft 4 in)	Hapoel Holon	(Israel)
SG	35	Ethan Burg	23 – 4 September 2002	1.91 m (6 ft 3 in)	Hapoel Jerusalem	(Israel)
PG	45	Tamir Blatt	29 – 4 May 1997	1.90 m (6 ft 3 in)	Hapoel Tel Aviv	(Israel)
PG	99	Guy Palatin	25 – 25 September 2000	1.89 m (6 ft 2 in)	Hapoel Tel Aviv	(Israel)

Head coach

- (Israel) Ariel Beit-Halahmy

Assistant coach(es)

- (Israel) Yoav Shamir
- (Israel) Guy Kaplan

Legend

- (C) Team captain
- Club – describes last
  club before the competition
- Age – describes age
  on 27 August 2026

=== Depth chart ===
Pos.	Starting 5	Bench 1	Bench 2
C	Roman Sorkin	Itay Segev
PF	Tomer Ginat	Nimrod Levi
SF	Deni Avdija	Yovel Zoosman	Rafi Menco
SG	Khadeen Carrington	Bar Timor	Ethan Burg
PG	Yam Madar	Guy Palatin

=== Notable players ===
Current notable players who have played for the national team:

Players previously called up roster
Players
Coaches

Pos.	No.	Name	Age – Date of birth	Height	Club	Ctr.
SG		Raz Adam	26 – 20 October 1999	1.93 m (6 ft 4 in)	Hapoel Galil Elyon	(Israel)
F		Deni Avdija	25 – 3 January 2001	2.06 m (6 ft 9 in)	Portland Trail Blazers	(United States)
PG		Gil Beni	27 – 27 October 1998	1.80 m (5 ft 11 in)	Maccabi Ironi Ramat Gan	(Israel)
F		Oz Blayzer	33 – 29 December 1992	1.99 m (6 ft 6 in)	Hapoel Tel Aviv	(Israel)
SG		Michael Brisker	28 – 21 February 1998	1.82 m (6 ft 0 in)	Free agent
C		Gabriel Chachashvili	26 – 8 December 1999	2.09 m (6 ft 10 in)	Hapoel Jerusalem	(Israel)
F		T. J. Cline	31 – 22 July 1994	2.06 m (6 ft 9 in)	Ironi Ness Ziona	(Israel)
G/F		Or Cornelius	28 – 26 September 1997	1.97 m (6 ft 6 in)	Elitzur Netanya	(Israel)
G/F		Shawn Dawson	32 – 12 December 1993	1.98 m (6 ft 6 in)	Bnei Herzliya	(Israel)
SG		John DiBartolomeo	34 – 20 June 1991	1.83 m (6 ft 0 in)	Maccabi Tel Aviv	(Israel)
F/C		Ilay Dolinski	21 – 6 February 2005	2.04 m (6 ft 8 in)	Ironi Kiryat Ata	(Israel)
G		Noam Dovrat	23 – 16 July 2002	1.95 m (6 ft 5 in)	Miami Hurricanes	(United States)
PF		Tomer Ginat	31 – 7 November 1994	2.03 m (6 ft 8 in)	Hapoel Tel Aviv	(Israel)
G/F		Golan Gutt	31 – 11 July 1994	1.95 m (6 ft 5 in)	Maccabi Rishon LeZion	(Israel)
PF		Yotam Hanochi	25 – 8 December 2000	2.03 m (6 ft 8 in)	Hapoel Jerusalem	(Israel)
G		Max Heidegger	28 – 5 June 1997	1.91 m (6 ft 3 in)	Bnei Herzliya	(Israel)
G		Roi Huber	29 – 10 February 1997	1.88 m (6 ft 2 in)	Hapoel Jerusalem	(Israel)
G/F		Egor Koulechov	31 – 5 November 1994	1.96 m (6 ft 5 in)	Keflavík	(Iceland)
PF		Gur Lavi	24 – 27 March 2001	2.00 m (6 ft 7 in)	Maccabi Tel Aviv	(Israel)
PF		Nimrod Levi	30 – 24 March 1995	2.08 m (6 ft 10 in)	Hapoel Jerusalem	(Israel)
PG		Niv Misgav	30 – 25 July 1995	1.83 m (6 ft 0 in)	Hapoel Gilboa Galil	(Israel)
G/F		Itay Moskovits	25 – 31 March 2000	1.92 m (6 ft 4 in)	Ironi Ness Zion	(Israel)
PG		Ben Saraf	19 – 14 April 2006	1.99 m (6 ft 6 in)	Brooklyn Nets	(United States)
C		Benayu Sror	26 – 1 November 1999	2.08 m (6 ft 10 in)	Elitzur Netanya	(Israel)
SG		Joaquin Szuchman	31 – 29 January 1995	1.91 m (6 ft 3 in)	Maccabi Ra'anana	(Israel)
G		Bar Timor	33 – 2 March 1992	1.92 m (6 ft 4 in)	Hapoel Tel Aviv	(Israel)
C		Alex Tyus	38 – 8 January 1988	2.03 m (6 ft 8 in)	Bordo Sportif	(Turkey)
G/F		Spencer Weisz	30 – 31 May 1995	1.93 m (6 ft 4 in)	Ironi Ness Zion	(Israel)
PG		Noam Yaacov	21 – 20 October 2004	1.86 m (6 ft 1 in)	Utah Utes	(United States)
C		Idan Zalmanson	30 – 18 April 1995	2.06 m (6 ft 9 in)	Hapoel Holon	(Israel)
G		Yiftach Ziv	30 – 9 July 1995	1.91 m (6 ft 3 in)	Hapoel Tel Aviv	(Israel)
G/F		Yovel Zoosman	27 – 12 May 1998	1.99 m (6 ft 6 in)	Hapoel Jerusalem	(Israel)

Legend

- Club – describes last
  club on 1 March 2026
- Age – describes age
  on 1 March 2026

== Head coach position ==
- (United States) Morris “Tubby” Raskin – (1952)
- (Israel) Jacob Saltiel – (1953–1954)
- (United States) Elmer Ripley – (1956–1957)
- (Israel) Eliahu Amiel – (1958–1959)
- (United States) Mickey Fisher – (1960)
- (Israel) Yehoshua Rozin – (1961–1964)
- (Israel) Shimon Shelah – (1965–1971)
- (United States) Doyle Parrack – (1972–1973)
- (Israel) Avraham Hemmo – (1973–1976)
- (Israel) Ralph Klein – (1977–1983)
- (Israel) Arie Maliniak – (1983–1984)
- (Israel) Zvi Sherf – (1984–1987)
- (Israel) Moshe Weinkrantz – (1988)
- (Israel) Ralph Klein – (1988–1990)
- (Israel) Zvi Sherf – (1991–1997)
- (Israel) Muli Katzurin – (1997–2004)
- (Israel) Zvi Sherf – (2005–2009)
- (Israel) Arik Shivek – (2010–2014)
- (Israel) Erez Edelstein – (2014–2017)
- (Israel) Oded Kattash – (2017–2021)
- (Israel) Guy Goodes – (2021–2023)
- (Israel) Ariel Beit-Halahmy – (2023–present)

== Gallery ==
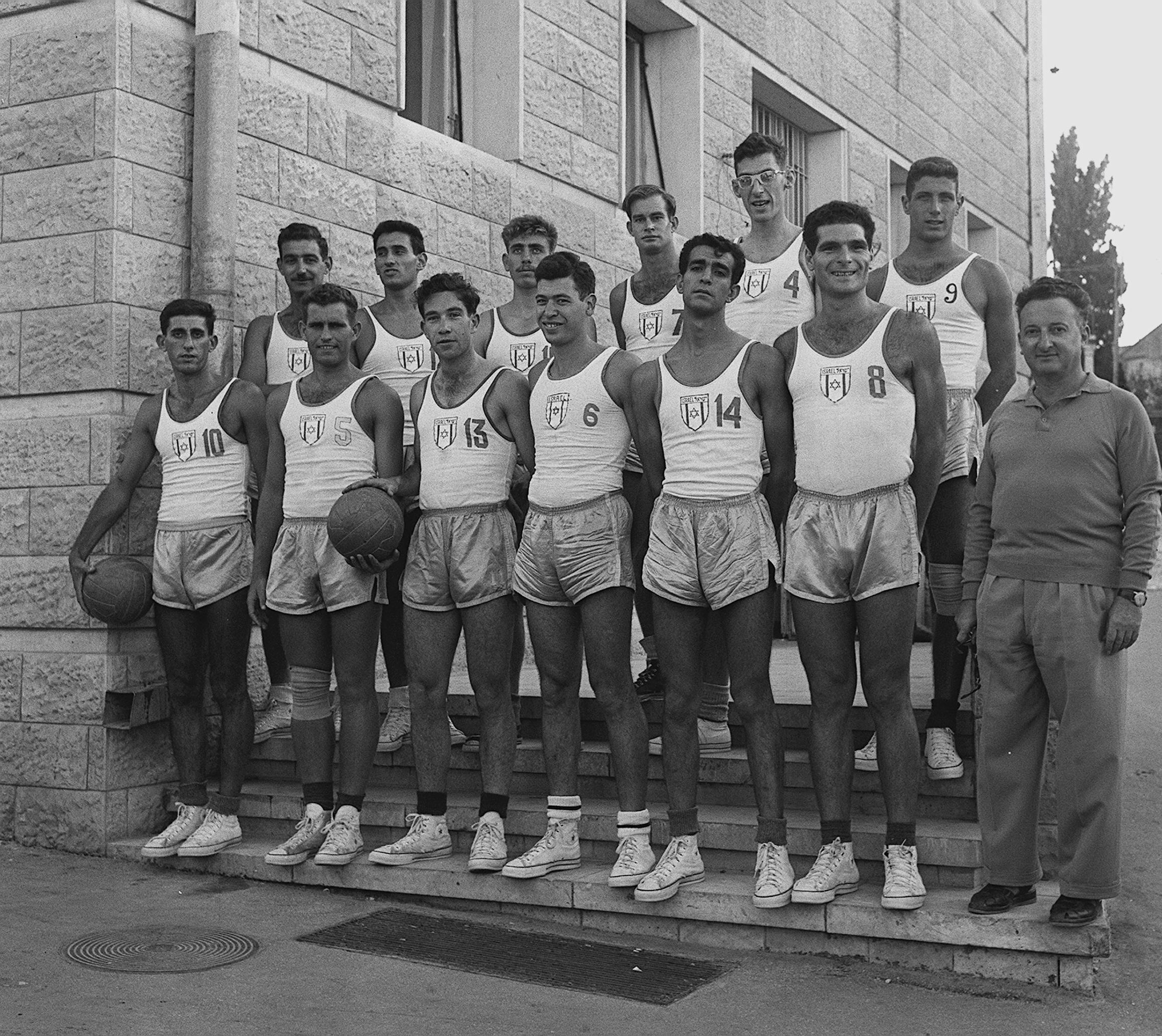
Israeli Basketball Team, 1960

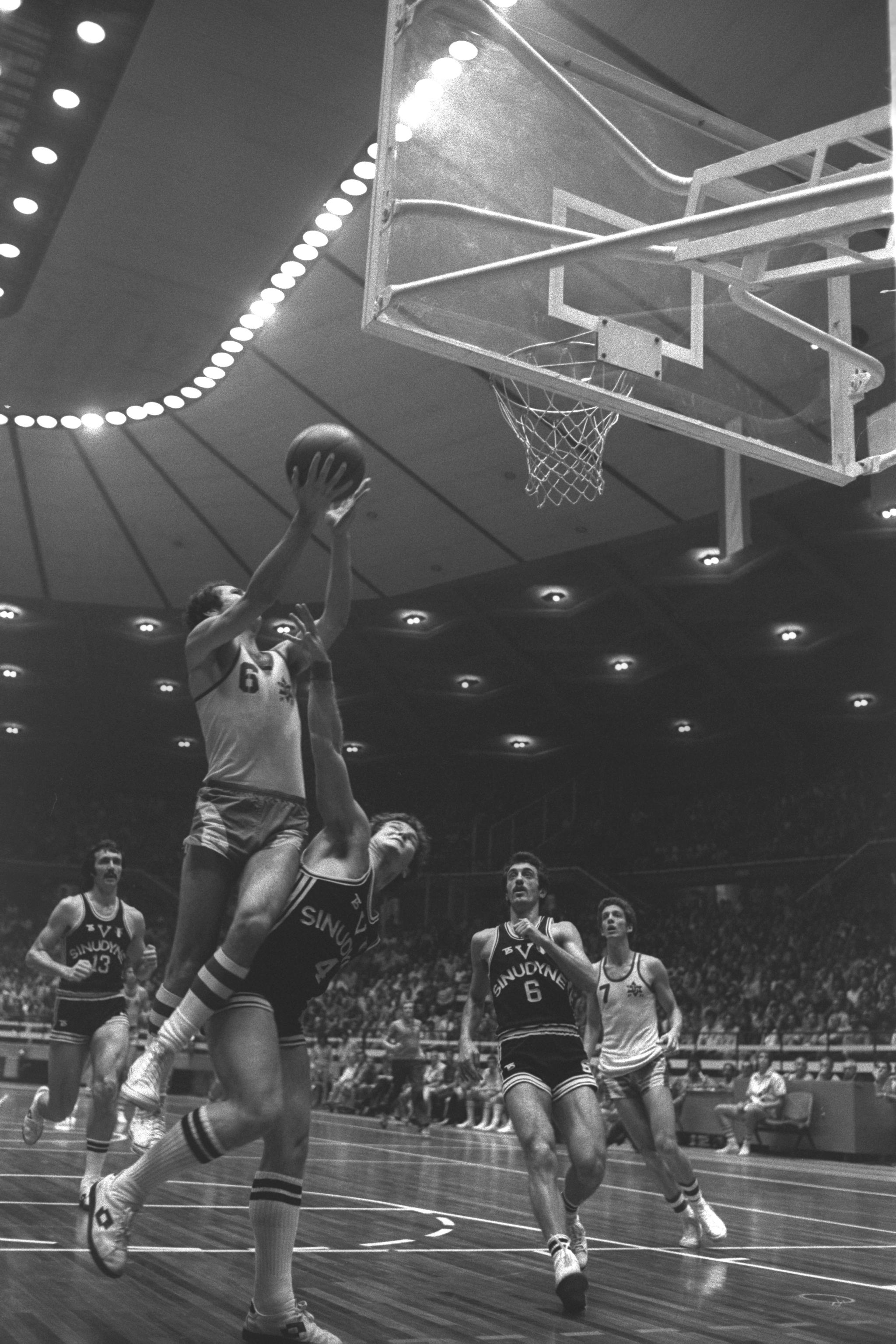
Tal Brody scoring

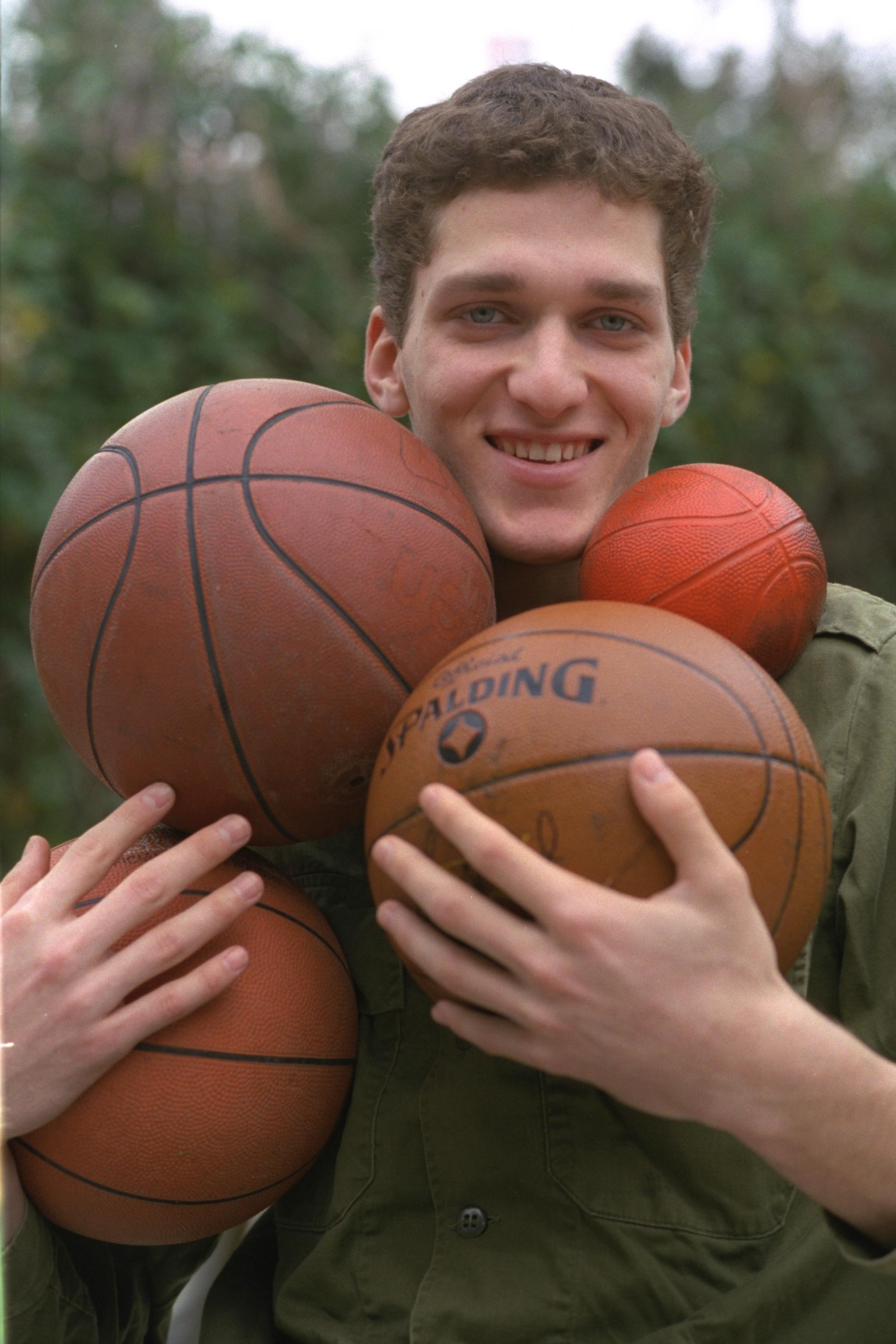
Doron Sheffer

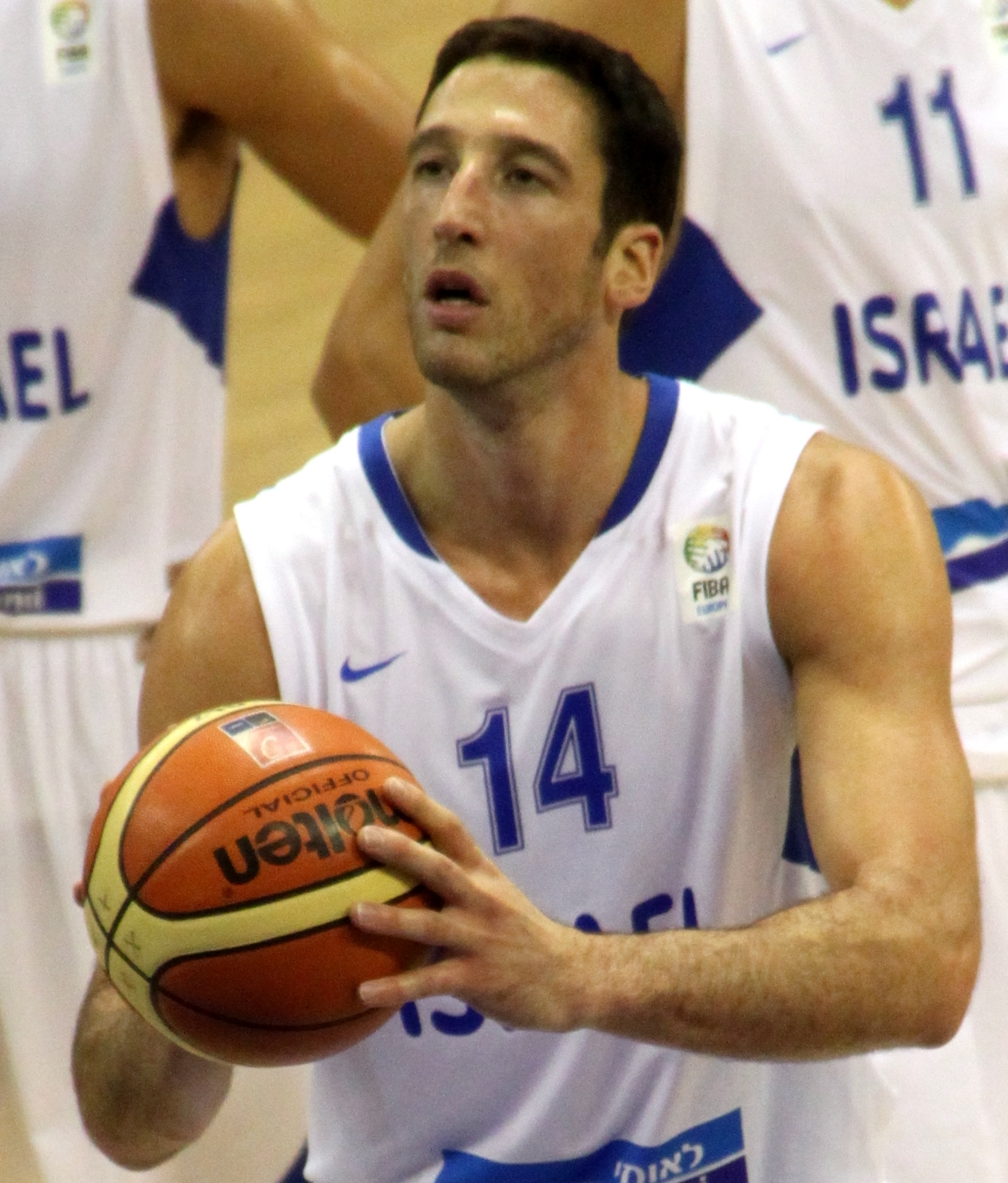
Yaniv Green

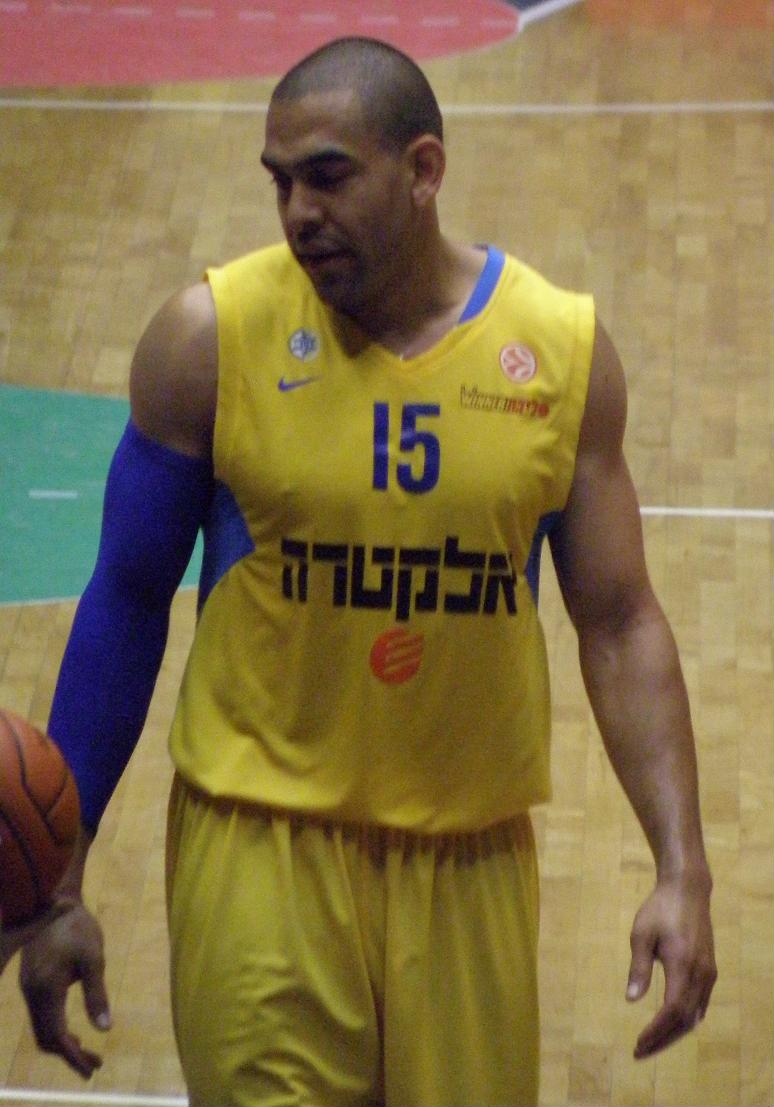
David Blu

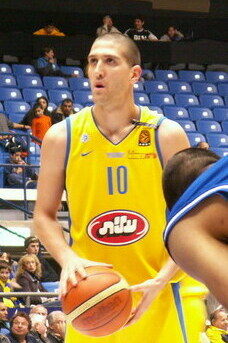
Tal Burstein

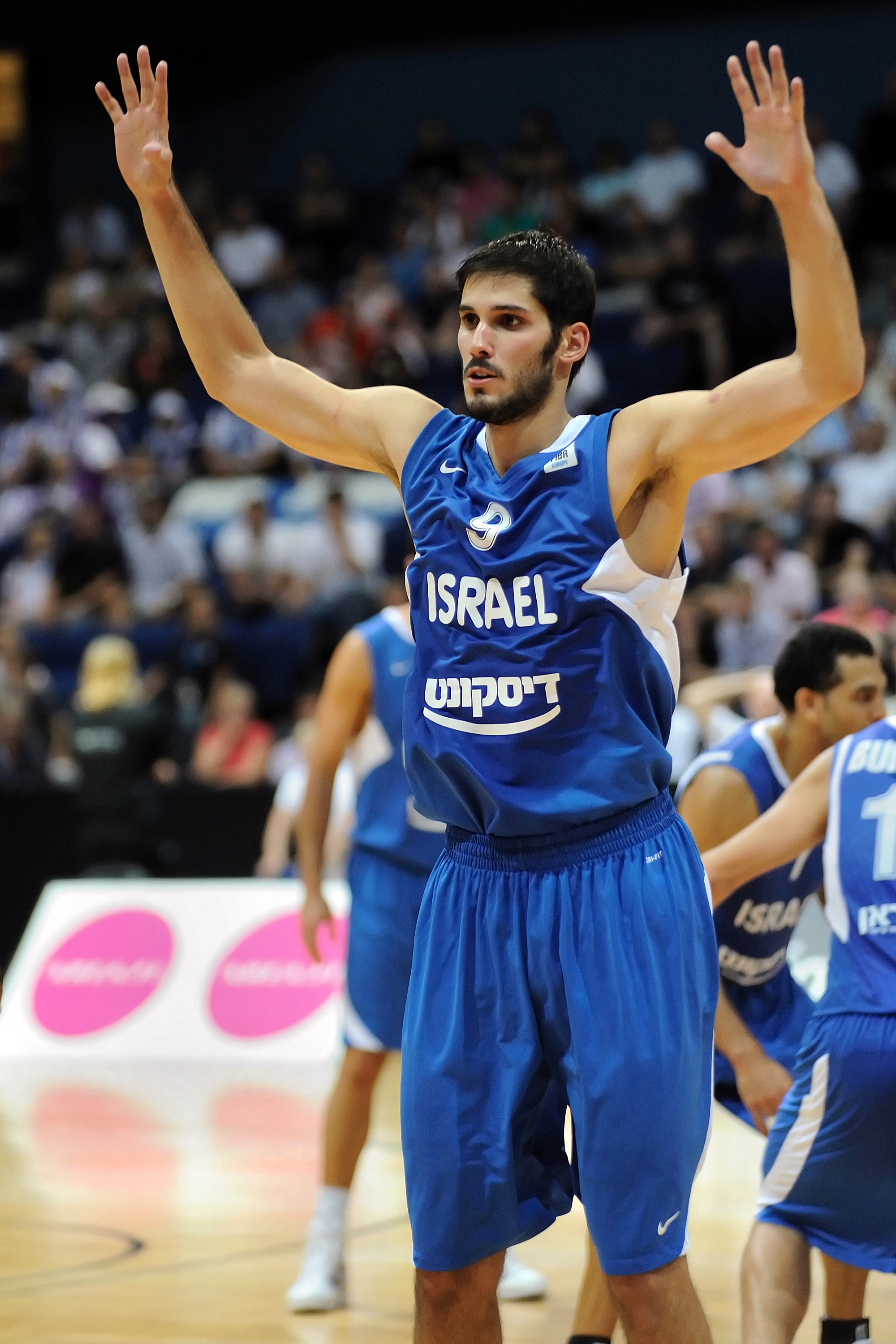
Omri Casspi, playing for Israel in 2010

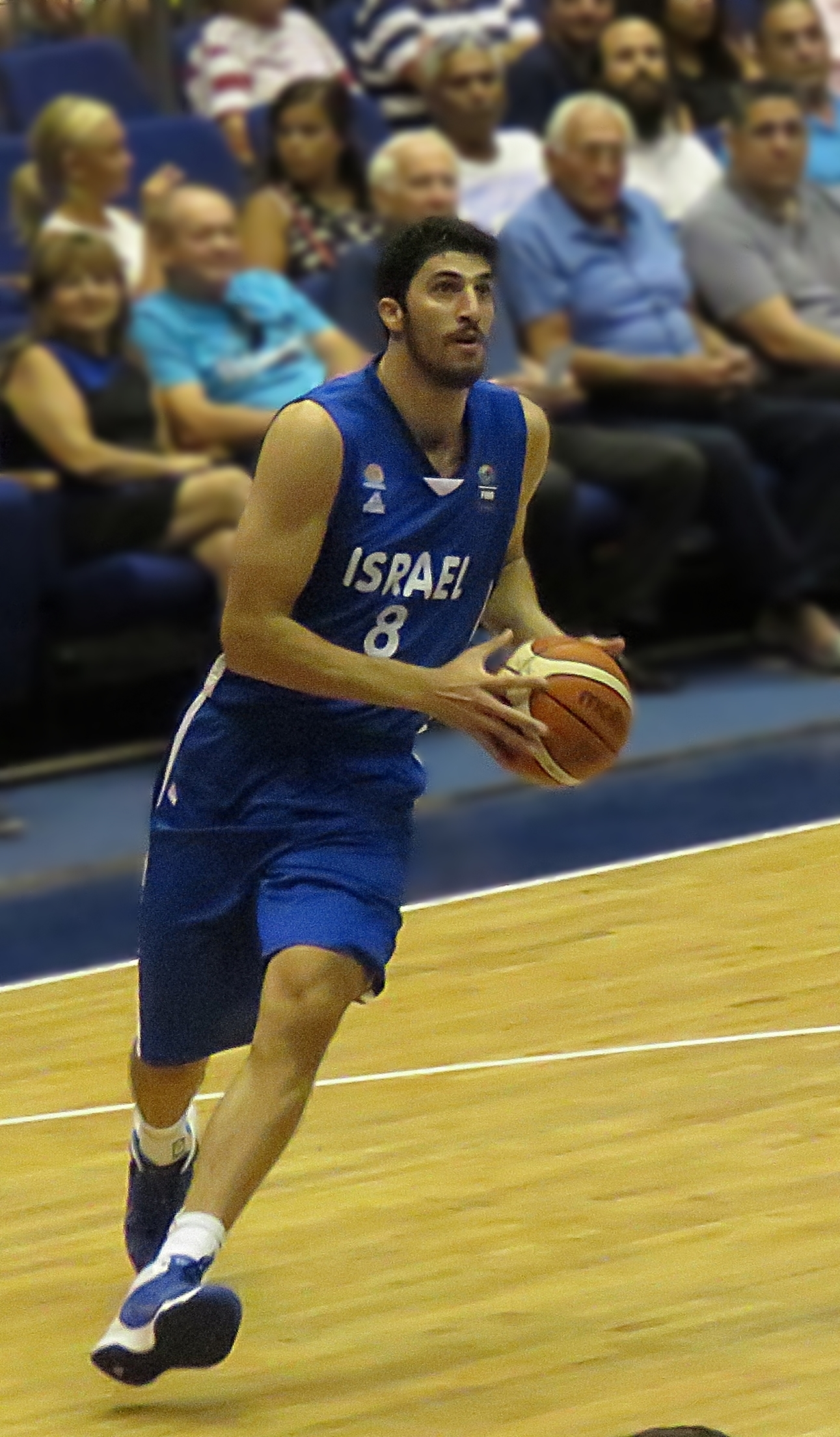
Lior Eliyahu

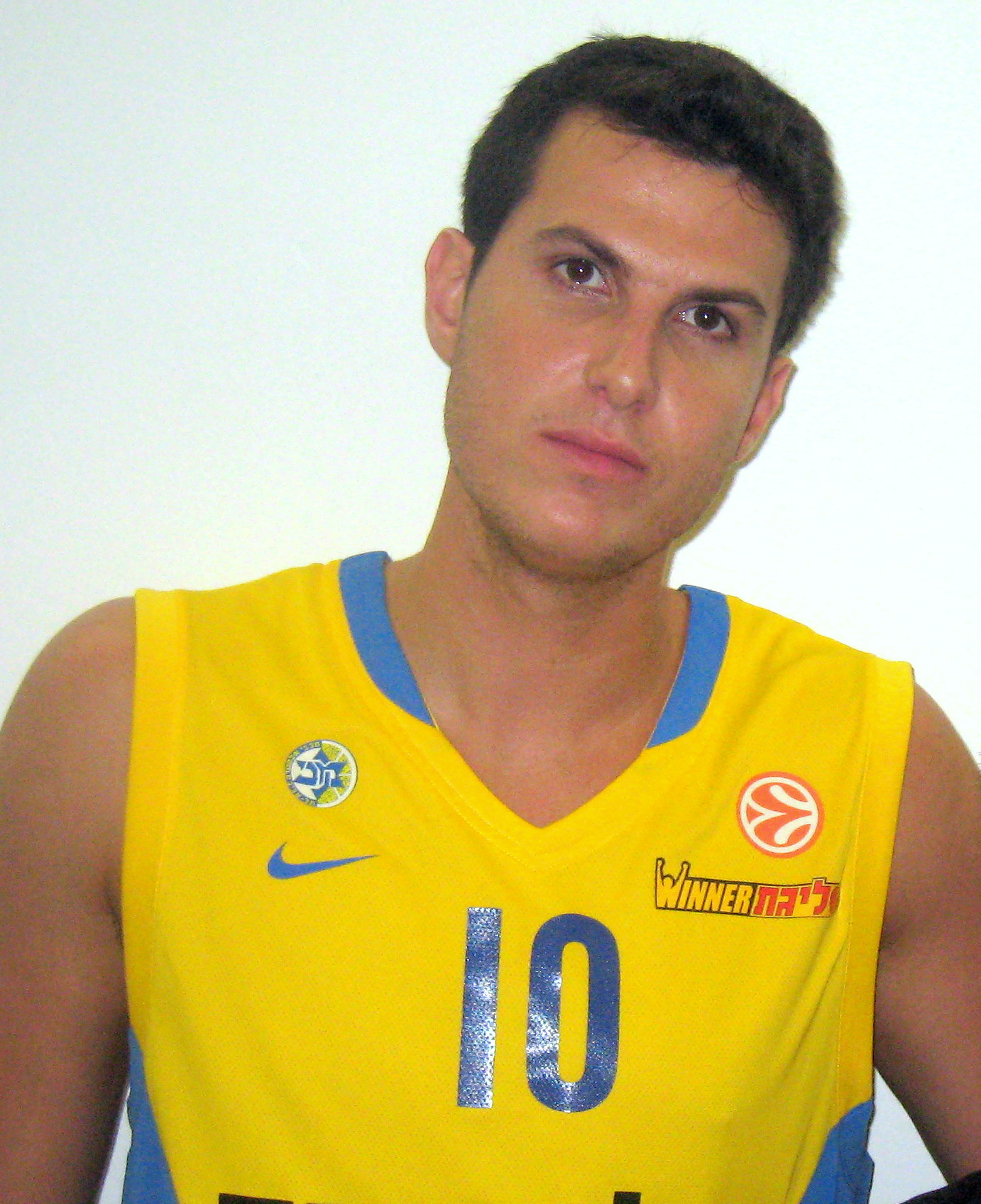
Guy Pnini

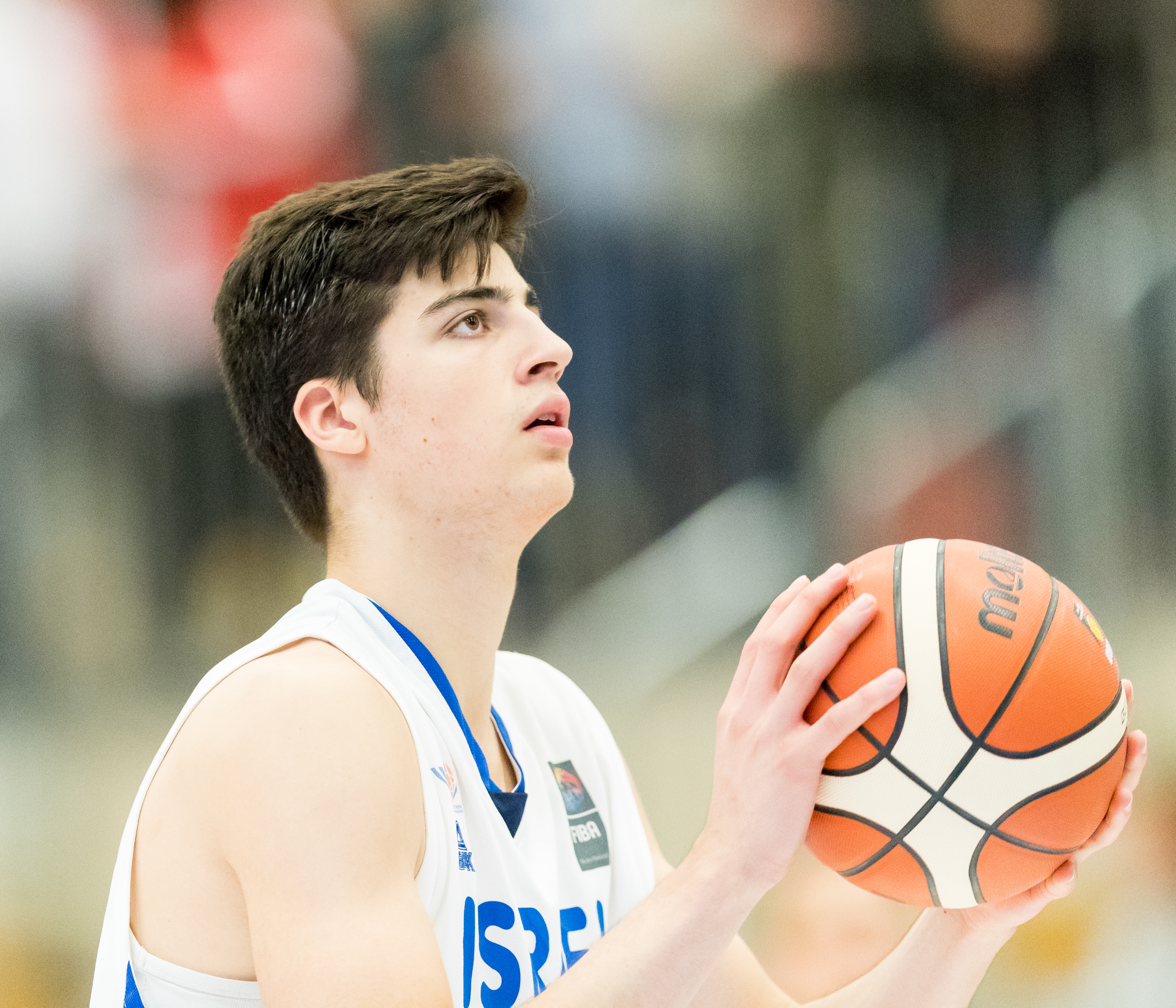
Deni Avdija

== Past rosters ==
1952 Olympic Games: finished 20th among 23 teams

3 Avraham Schneor, 4 Zacharia Ofri, 5 Daniel Levy, 6 Menahem Korman, 8 Amos Linkowsky, 9 Shimon Szmuckler, 10 Yehuda Wiener, 11 Ralph Klein, 12 Reuben Perach, 13 Eliahu Amiel, 14 Dan Boksenbaum, 15 Marcel Hefez (Coach: Jacob Saltiel)

1953 EuroBasket: finished 5th among 17 teams

3 Avraham Schneor, 4 Zacharia Ofri, 5 Daniel Levy, 6 Menahem Korman, 7 Alfred Cohen, 8 David Heiblum, 9 Shimon Szmuckler, 10 Ernst Winer, 11 Ralph Klein, 12 Marcel Hefez, 13 Mark Mimran, 14 Dan Boksenbaum, 15 Reuben Perach (Coach: Jacob Saltiel)

1954 FIBA World Cup: finished 8th among 12 teams

3 Avraham Schneor, 4 Zacharia Ofri, 5 Daniel Moshe, 6 Reuben Perach, 7 Alfred Cohen, 8 Tavil Israel, 9 Shimon Shelah, 10 Yehuda Gafni, 11 Rafael Ram, 12 Marcel Hefez, 13 Azriel Luboshitz, 14 Dan Erez (Coach: Jacob Saltiel)

1959 EuroBasket: finished 11th among 17 teams

3 Avraham Schneor, 4 Albert Hemmo, 6 Haim Kastan, 7 Amos Lin, 9 David Tari, 10 Jacob Edelist, 11 Ralph Klein, 12 Igal Volodarsky, 13 David Kaminsky, 14 Haim Hazan, 15 Erez Lustig, 16 Shabetai Ben-Bassat (Coach: Eli Amtel)

1961 EuroBasket: finished 11th among 19 teams

4 Tanhum Cohen-Mintz, 5 Erez Lustig, 6 Ami Shelef, 7 Hanoch Barkon, 8 Albert Hemmo, 9 Offer Eshed, 10 David Kaminsky, 11 Ralph Klein, 12 David Tari, 13 Abraham Hoffman, 14 Haim Hazan, 15 Igal Volodarsky (Coach: Yehoshua Rozin)

1963 EuroBasket: finished 9th among 16 teams

4 Tanhum Cohen-Mintz, 5 Offer Eshed, 6 Ami Shelef, 7 Zvi Lubezki, 8 Albert Hemmo, 9 Abraham Gutt, 10 Igal Volodarsky, 11 Ralph Klein, 12 Shlomo Ben-Zeev, 13 Abraham Hoffman, 14 Haim Hazan, 15 Ilan Zeiger (Coach: Yehoshua Rozin)

1965 EuroBasket: finished 6th among 16 teams

4 Tanhum Cohen-Mintz, 5 Offer Eshed, 6 Ami Shelef, 7 Zvi Lubezki, 8 Albert Hemmo, 9 Igal Volodarsky, 10 Abraham Gutt, 11 David Kaminsky, 12 Gideon Freitag, 13 Abraham Hoffman, 14 Haim Hazan, 15 Ilan Zeiger (Coach: Shimon Shelah)

1966 Asian Games: finished (gold) among 11 teams

4 Amnon Avidan, 5 Tanhum Cohen-Mintz, 6 Igal Dar, 7 Gershon Dekel, 8 Offer Eshed, 9 Abraham Gutt, 10 David Kaminsky, 11 Zvi Lubezki, 12 Itshak Shachar, 13 Ami Shelef, 14 Haim Starkman, 15 Ilan Zohar (Coach: Shimon Shelah)

1967 EuroBasket: finished 8th among 16 teams

4 Tanhum Cohen-Mintz, 5 Offer Eshed, 6 Gabi Teichner, 7 Willie Wold, 8 Shamuel Avishar, 9 Igal Dar, 10 Abraham Gutt, 11 Gershon Dekel, 12 David Kaminsky, 13 Abraham Hoffman, 14 Haim Starkman, 15 Ilan Zohar (Coach: Shimon Shelah)

1969 EuroBasket: finished 11th among 12 teams

4 Gabi Teichner, 5 Offer Eshed, 6 Ivan Leshinsky, 7 Giora Dori, 8 Haim Baram, 9 Gabi Neumark, 10 Haim Starkman, 11 Gershon Dekel, 12 David Kaminsky, 13 Itamar Marzel, 14 Mark Turenshine, 15 Ilan Zohar (Coach: Shimon Shelah)

1970 Asian Games: finished (silver) among 12 teams

4 Dan Barzily, 5 Tanhum Cohen-Mintz, 6 Hillel Gilboa, 7 Ronald Green, 8 Hanan Keren, 9 Ivan Leshinsky, 10 Itamar Marzel, 11 Gabi Neumark, 12 Mike Schwartz, 13 Haim Starkman, 14 Gabi Teichner, 15 Mark Turenshine (Coach: Shimon Shelah)

1971 EuroBasket: finished 11th among 12 teams

4 Joseph Leja, 5 Gabi Teichner, 6 Tal Brody, 7 Mark Turenshine, 8 Hanan Keren, 9 Mike Schwartz, 10 Haim Starkman, 11 Zvi Inbar, 12 Dan Barzily, 13 Itamar Marzel, 14 Abraham Zuchman, 15 Boaz Yanai (Coach: Shimon Shelah)

1973 EuroBasket: finished 7th among 12 teams

4 Jonathan Zacks, 5 Shamuel Avishar, 6 Tal Brody, 7 Gur Ben-David, 8 Hanan Keren, 9 Mickey Berkowitz, 10 Barry Leibowitz, 11 Gabi Neumark, 12 Zvi Inbar, 13 Itamar Marzel, 14 Jacob Eisner, 15 Boaz Yanai (Coach: Abraham Hemmo)

1974 Asian Games: finished (gold) among 11 teams

4 Motti Aroesti, 5 Shamuel Avishar, 6 Mickey Berkowitz, 7 Tal Brody, 8 Jacob Eisner, 9 Hanan Keren, 10 Itamar Marzel, 11 Avigdor Moskowitz, 12 Shamuel Nachmias, 13 Shuki Schwartz, 14 Boaz Yanai, 15 Shmaryahu Zaslevsky (Coach: Abraham Hemmo)

1975 EuroBasket: finished 7th among 12 teams

4 Shlomo Blum, 5 Shamuel Nachmias, 6 Tal Brody, 7 Shuki Schwartz, 8 Hanan Keren, 9 Mickey Berkowitz, 10 Barry Leibowitz, 11 Avigdor Moskowitz, 12 Or Goren, 13 Itamar Marzel, 14 Jacob Eisner, 15 Boaz Yanai (Coach: Abraham Hemmo)

1977 EuroBasket: finished 5th among 12 teams

4 Shamuel Nachmias, 5 Shuki Schwartz, 6 Or Goren, 7 Pinhas Hozez, 8 Hanan Keren, 9 Mickey Berkowitz, 10 Barry Leibowitz, 11 Avigdor Moskowitz, 12 Steve Kaplan, 13 Itamar Marzel, 14 Roni Rothschild, 15 Boaz Yanai (Coach: Ralph Klein)

1979 EuroBasket: finished (silver) among 12 teams

4 Eric Minkin, 5 Shuki Schwartz, 6 Uri Ben-Ari, 7 Motti Aroesti, 8 Lou Silver,
9 Mickey Berkowitz (MVP), 10 Barry Leibowitz, 11 Avigdor Moskowitz, 12 Steve Kaplan, 13 Shai Sharf, 14 Pinhas Hozez, 15 Boaz Yanai (Coach: Ralph Klein)

1981 EuroBasket: finished 6th among 12 teams

4 Jim Boatwright, 5 John Willis, 6 Haim Zlotikman, 7 Gal Knaz, 8 Steve Schlachter, 9 Mickey Berkowitz, 10 Barry Leibowitz, 11 Avigdor Moskowitz, 12 Lou Silver, 13 Doron Jamchi, 14 Pinhas Hozez, 15 Boaz Yanai (Coach: Ralph Klein)

1983 EuroBasket: finished 6th among 12 teams

4 Howard Lassoff, 5 Israel Elimelech, 6 Lou Silver, 7 Motti Aroesti, 8 Steve Schlachter, 9 Miki Berkovich, 10 Haim Zlotikman, 11 Shmuel Zisman, 12 Doron Jamchi, 13 Ofer Yaakobi, 14 Niv Bogin, 15 John Willis (Coach: Ralph Klein)

1985 EuroBasket: finished 9th among 12 teams

4 Amir Bino, 5 Motti Daniel, 6 Ofer Yaakobi, 7 Motti Aroesti, 8 Steve Schlachter, 9 Miki Berkovich, 10 Haim Zlotikman, 11 Shmuel Zisman, 12 Doron Jamchi, 13 Hen Lippin, 14 Pinhas Hozez, 15 Johan Willis (Coach: Zvi Sherf)

1986 FIBA World Cup: finished 7th among 24 teams

4 Howard Lassoff, 5 Motti Daniel, 6 Adi Gordon, 7 Nir Rechlis, 8 Ariel Rosenberg, 9 Miki Berkovich, 10 Hen Lippin, 11 Doron Shefa, 12 Doron Jamchi, 13 LaVon Mercer, 14 Tomer Steinhauer, 15 Ofer Yaakobi (Coach: Zvi Sherf)

1987 EuroBasket: finished 11th among 12 teams

4 Howard Lassoff, 5 Motti Daniel, 6 Adi Gordon, 7 Nadav Henefeld, 8 Ofer Fleisher, 9 Ariel Rosenberg, 10 Hen Lippin, 11 Doron Shefa, 12 Doron Jamchi, 13 LaVon Mercer, 14 Tomer Steinhauer, 15 Itzhak Cohen (Coach: Zvi Sherf)

1993 EuroBasket: finished 14th among 16 teams

4 Nadav Henefeld, 5 Ofer Fleisher, 6 Israel Elimelech, 7 Desi Barmore, 8 Shimon Amsalem, 9 Adi Gordon, 10 Tomer Steinhauer, 11 Doron Sheffer, 12 Doron Jamchi, 13 Amir Katz, 14 Lior Arditty, 15 Motti Daniel (Coach: Zvi Sherf)

1995 EuroBasket: finished 10th among 14 teams

4 Nadav Henefeld, 5 Ofer Fleisher, 6 Guy Goodes, 7 Brad Leaf, 8 Dror Cohen, 9 Adi Gordon, 10 Amir Muchtary, 11 Doron Sheffer, 12 Doron Jamchi, 13 Kobi Balul, 14 Lior Arditty, 15 Motti Daniel (Coach: Zvi Sherf)

1997 EuroBasket: finished 9th among 16 teams

4 Nadav Henefeld, 5 Lior Arditty, 6 Shalom "Puppy" Turgeman, 7 Amir Muchtary, 8 David Bernsley, 9 Oren Aharoni, 10 Oded Kattash, 11 Doron Sheffer, 12 Gur Shelef, 13 Uri Cohen-Mintz, 14 Tomer Steinhauer, 15 Ofer Fleisher (Coach: Zvi Sherf)

1999 EuroBasket: finished 12th among 16 teams

4 Nadav Henefeld, 5 Motti Daniel, 6 Guy Goodes, 7 Shalom "Puppy" Turgeman, 8 Shimon Amsalem, 9 Meir Tapiro, 10 Oded Kattash, 11 Doron Sheffer, 12 Gur Shelef, 13 Uri Cohen-Mintz, 14 Tomer Steinhauer, 15 Yoav Saffar (Coach: Muli Katzurin)

2001 EuroBasket: finished 12th among 16 teams

4 Israel Sheinfeld, 5 Shahar Gordon, 6 Derrick Sharp, 7 Shalom Turgeman, 8 Lior Lubin, 9 Ido Kozikaro, 10 Afik Nissim, 11 Meir Tapiro, 12 Yoav Saffar, 13 Barak Peleg, 14 Yaniv Green, 15 Moshe Mizrahi (Coach: Muli Katzurin)

2003 EuroBasket: finished 7th among 16 teams

4 Erez Katz, 5 Yotam Halperin, 6 Derrick Sharp, 7 Moshe Mizrahi, 8 Israel Sheinfeld, 9 Gur Shelef, 10 Tal Burstein, 11 Meir Tapiro, 12 Yoav Saffar, 13 Ido Kozikaro, 14 Yaniv Green, 15 Shahar Gordon (Coach: Muli Katzurin)

2005 EuroBasket: finished 11th among 16 teams

4 Dror Hajaj, 5 Afik Nissim, 6 Sharon Shason, 7 Chris Watson, 8 Erez Markovich, 9 Gur Shelef, 10 Tal Burstein, 11 Meir Tapiro, 12 Moshe Mizrahi, 13 Ido Kozikaro, 14 Yaniv Green, 15 Yotam Halperin (Coach: Zvi Sherf)

2007 EuroBasket: finished 11th among 16 teams

4 Dror Hajaj, 5 Moran Roth, 6 Yotam Halperin, 7 Lior Eliyahu, 8 Erez Markovich, 9 Jeron Roberts, 10 Guy Pnini, 11 Meir Tapiro, 12 Matan Naor, 13 Ido Kozikaro, 14 Yaniv Green, 15 Amit Tamir (Coach: Zvi Sherf)

2009 EuroBasket: finished 14th among 16 teams

4 Moran Roth, 5 Yuval Naimy, 6 Gal Mekel, 7 Raviv Limonad, 8 Guy Pnini, 9 Yotam Halperin, 10 Tal Burstein, 11 Lior Eliyahu, 12 Moshe Mizrahi, 13 Ido Kozikaro, 14 Yaniv Green, 15 Amit Tamir (Coach: Zvi Sherf)

2011 EuroBasket: finished 13th among 24 teams

4 Yogev Ohayon, 5 Afik Nissim, 6 Yuval Naimy, 7 David Blu, 8 Guy Pnini, 9 Gal Mekel, 10 Tal Burstein (C), 11 Lior Eliyahu,
12 Yotam Halperin, 13 Elishay Kadir, 14 Yaniv Green, 15 Uri Kokia (Coach: Arik Shivek)

2013 EuroBasket: finished 21st among 24 teams

4 Raviv Limonad, 5 Afik Nissim, 6 Nitzan Hanochi, 7 Alex Tyus, 8 Lior Eliyahu, 9 Omri Casspi, 10 Guy Pnini, 11 Yogev Ohayon,
12 Yotam Halperin (C), 13 Ido Kozikaro, 14 Yaniv Green, 15 Elishay Kadir (Coach: Arik Shivek)

2015 EuroBasket: finished 10th among 24 teams

5 Dagan Yivzori, 6 Shawn Dawson, 7 Gal Mekel, 8 Lior Eliyahu, 9 Omri Casspi (C), 10 Raviv Limonad, 11 Elishay Kadir,
12 Yogev Ohayon, 14 Yaniv Green, 15 D'or Fischer, 16 Robert Rothbart, 23 Bar Timor (Coach: Erez Edelstein)

2017 EuroBasket: finished 21st among 24 teams

1 Richard Howell, 6 Shawn Dawson, 7 Gal Mekel, 8 Lior Eliyahu, 9 Omri Casspi (C), 10 Guy Pnini, 11 Elishay Kadir,
12 Yotam Halperin, 14 Oz Blayzer, 15 Bar Timor, 20 Idan Zalmanson, 21 Yogev Ohayon (Coach: Erez Edelstein)

2022 EuroBasket: finished 17th among 24 teams

4 Roman Sorkin, 7 Gal Mekel, 8 Deni Avdija, 10 Guy Pnini (C), 11 Yam Madar, 12 Rafi Menco, 15 Jake Cohen, 20 Idan Zalmanson,
30 Nimrod Levi, 41 Tomer Ginat, 45 Tamir Blatt, 50 Yovel Zoosman (Coach: Guy Goodes)

2025 EuroBasket: finished 14th among 24 teams

3 Khadeen Carrington, 6 Itay Segev, 8 Deni Avdija, 9 Roman Sorkin, 10 Bar Timor, 11 Yam Madar, 12 Rafi Menco, 30 Nimrod Levi,
35 Ethan Burg, 41 Tomer Ginat (C), 50 Yovel Zoosman, 99 Guy Palatin (Coach: Ariel Beit-Halahmy)

== Kit ==
=== Manufacturer ===
- 2015: Peak

== See also ==
- Sport in Israel
- Israel women's national basketball team
- Israel men's national under-20 basketball team
- Israel men's national under-18 basketball team
- Israel men's national under-16 basketball team
- Israel national 3x3 team
- Israeli Basketball Premier League
