= Moshe Mizrahi =

Moshe Mizrahi may refer to:

- Moshe Mizrahi (politician), Israel Police official and politician
- Moshe Mizrahi (basketball), Israeli basketball player
- Moshé Mizrahi, Israeli film director
