= Amir Schelach =

Israeli footballer (born 1970)

Amir Shelach
Personal information
- Date of birth: 11 July 1970 (age 56)
- Place of birth: Tel Aviv-Yafo, Israel
- Position: Centre-back

Youth career
- Maccabi Tel Aviv

Senior career*
Years	Team	Apps	(Gls)
1989–1990	Maccabi Herzliya		
1990–1998	Maccabi Tel Aviv	199	(2)
1998–1999	Beitar Jerusalem	29	(1)
1999–2000	Hapoel Haifa	27	(0)
2000–2002	Maccabi Tel Aviv	35	(0)
2002–2004	Maccabi Netanya	58	(0)
Total		348	(3)

International career
1992–2001	Israel	85	(0)

Managerial career
- 2007: Maccabi Netanya (assistant-manager)
- 2024–: Israel (assistant manager)
- * Club domestic league appearances and goals

Amir Shelach (Hebrew: אמיר שלח; born 11 July 1970) is an Israeli former professional footballer who played as a centre-back. He was capped 85 times for the Israel national team, from the early 1990s to the early 2000s; and the current co-assistant manager of Israel.

== Early and personal life ==
Amir's parents were both basketball players: His father is Shimon Shelah, a player and coach in Hapoel Tel Aviv who in 1960 took the Israeli Basketball championship as the head coach of Hapoel. Shimon was also capped 21 times for the Israel national basketball team and in 1965 was appointed as the head coach of the Israel national basketball team and under his guidance Israel qualified to four consecutive EuroBasket and finally in 1971 he left the national team.

Amir was married to Adi Shum, the daughter of Israeli former footballer and manager Itzhak Shum. Their son is Israeli Liga Leumit footballer Tom Shelach.

These days Amir is working in architecture and design with his brother-in-law Idan Shum.

== Honours ==
Maccabi Tel Aviv

- Israeli Premier League: 1991–92, 1994–95, 1995–96
- Israel State Cup: 1994, 1996, 2001
- Toto Cup: 1992–93
