= Degani =

Degani is a surname. Notable people with the surname include:

- Amos Degani (1926–2012), Israeli politician
- Barbara Degani (born 1966), Italian politician
- Menahem Degani (1927–2018), Israeli basketball player
- Valentino Degani (1905–1974), Italian footballer
