= Ofer Yaakobi =

Israeli basketball player (1961–2025)

Ofer Yaakobi עופר יעקובי
Personal information
- Born: January 12, 1961 Kiryat Shmona, Israel
- Died: August 5, 2025 (aged 64) Las Vegas, Nevada, U.S.
- Listed height: 2.00 m (6 ft 7 in)
- Position: Forward

Ofer Yaakobi (Hebrew: עופר יעקובי; January 12, 1961 – August 5, 2025) was an Israeli basketball player. He played the forward position. He competed in the Israeli Basketball Premier League, and played for the Israel national team.

== Biography ==
Yaakobi was born in Kiryat Shmona, Israel, and was 2.0 m (6 ft 7 in) tall. He was married to Israeli beauty queen Pazit Cohen.

He competed in the Israeli Basketball Premier League. Yaakobi played for Hapoel Gan Shmuel, Hapoel Holon, Hapoel Tel Aviv, Beitar Tel Aviv, Hapoel Gvat, and Maccabi Petah Tikva.

Yaakobi also played for the Israel national team. He competed in the 1983 European Championship for Men, 1985 European Championship for Men, and 1986 World Championship for Men.

Yaakobi died in Las Vegas on August 5, 2025, at the age of 64.
