= Abraham Gutt =

Israeli basketball player (1944-)

Abraham (Rami) Gutt אברהם גוט
Personal information
- Born: March 10, 1944 (age 82)
- Listed height: 1.96 m (6 ft 5 in)
- Position: Forward
Medals
Men's basketball
Representing Israel
Asian Games
Gold medal – first place	1966 Thailand
Maccabiah Games
Silver medal – second place	1961 Tel Aviv

Abraham Gutt (Hebrew: אברהם גוט; born March 10, 1944) is an Israeli former basketball player. He played the forward position. He played 13 seasons in the Israeli Basketball Premier League, competed for the Israeli national basketball team, and won a silver medal with Team Israel in basketball in the 1961 Maccabiah Games.

== Sports career ==
Abraham (Rami) Gutt is 1.96 m (6 ft 5 in) tall. He enlisted in the Israel Defense Forces, and played on the IDF basketball team.

He played 13 seasons in the Israeli Basketball Premier League for Hapoel Tel Aviv.

Gutt played for the Israeli national basketball team in the 1961 Maccabiah Games (winning a silver medal), 1963 European Championship for Men, 1965 European Championship for Men, 1966 Asian Games (winning a gold medal), and 1967 European Championship for Men.
