= Delaware Fightin' Blue Hens men's basketball =

Basketball team that represents University of Delaware in Newark, Delaware

2026–27 Delaware Fightin' Blue Hens men's basketball team
- University: University of Delaware
- First season: 1905–06; 121 years ago
- Head coach: Martin Ingelsby (11th season)
- Location: Newark, Delaware
- Arena: Bob Carpenter Center (capacity: 5,000)
- Conference: Conference USA
- Nickname: Blue Hens
- Colors: Royal blue and gold

NCAA Division I tournament appearances
- 1992, 1993, 1998, 1999, 2014, 2022

Conference tournament champions
- NAC/AmEast: 1992, 1993, 1998, 1999; CAA: 2014, 2022

Conference regular-season champions
- 1992, 1998, 1999, 2014

Uniforms
Home	Away	Alternate

The Delaware Fightin' Blue Hens men's basketball team is the basketball team that represents University of Delaware in Newark, Delaware. The school's team was first fielded on the 1905–06 season, and currently competes in the National Collegiate Athletic Association (NCAA) at the Division I level as a member of Conference USA (CUSA) since 2025. Home games are played at the Acierno Arena at the Bob Carpenter Center. Delaware has appeared six times in the NCAA Division I men's basketball tournament, most recently in 2022.

The Blue Hens are coached by Martin Ingelsby who has been the head coach since 2016. After the 2024–25 season, Delaware left the Coastal Athletic Association to join Conference USA.

== Postseason results ==
In eight appearances in postseason tournaments, the Fightin' Blue Hens have not won a postseason game.

=== NCAA tournament results ===
The Fightin' Blue Hens have appeared in the NCAA tournament six times. Their record is 0–6.

Year	Seed	Round	Opponent	Result
1992	No. 13	First Round	No. 4 Cincinnati	L 47–85
1993	No. 13	First Round	No. 4 Louisville	L 70–76
1998	No. 15	First Round	No. 2 Purdue	L 56–95
1999	No. 13	First Round	No. 4 Tennessee	L 52–62
2014	No. 13	First Round	No. 4 Michigan State	L 78–93
2022	No. 15	First Round	No. 2 Villanova	L 60–80

=== NIT results ===
The Fightin' Blue Hens have appeared in the National Invitation Tournament (NIT) one time. Their record is 0–1.

Year	Round	Opponent	Result
2000	First Round	Villanova	L 63–72

=== CBI results ===
The Fightin' Blue Hens have appeared in the College Basketball Invitational (CBI) one time. Their record is 0–1.

Year	Round	Opponent	Result
2012	First Round	Butler	L 58–75

== Fightin' Blue Hens in international leagues ==
- Steve Schlachter (born 1954), American-Israeli basketball player in the Israeli Basketball Premier League
- John Gordon (born 1976), Delaware native, played for the Blue Hens from 1998 to 2000. He was a national runner up for the Naismith Men's College Basketball Player of the Year for Mid-Major. Gordon was inducted into the Delaware Basketball Hall of Fame on March 13, 2013. Additionally, Gordon played pro-basketball in the National Basketball League in Sydney, Australia.
