= Hanan Keren =

Israeli basketball player (born 1952)

Hanan Keren חנן קרן
Personal information
- Born: September 2, 1952 (age 74) Israel
- Listed height: 1.91 m (6 ft 3 in)

Career highlights
- 1974 Asian Games gold medal

Hanan Keren, also written Chanan Keren (Hebrew: חנן קרן; born September 2, 1952), is an Israeli former basketball player. He played the guard position. He played in the Israel Basketball Premier League, and for the Israeli national basketball team.

== Biography ==
Keren was born in Israel. He is 1.91 m (6 ft 3 in) tall.

He played in the Israel Basketball Premier League, and averaged 16.1 points per game in his career. Keren played for Maccabi Tel Aviv, Hapoel Ramat Gan, and Kiryat Motzkin.

Keren also played for the Israeli national basketball team in the 1971 European Championship for Men, 1972 Pre-Olympic Basketball Tournament, 1973 European Championship for Men, 1975 European Championship for Men, and 1977 European Championship for Men.
