= Gabi Neumark =

Israeli basketball player (1946–2000)

Gabriel "Gabi" Neumark גבי נוימרק
Personal information
- Born: August 7, 1946 Palestine
- Died: December 4, 2000 (aged 54)
- Listed height: 1.98 m (6 ft 6 in)

Career highlights
- 1970 Asian Games Basketball Championship silver medal

Gabriel "Gabi" Neumark (Hebrew: גבי נוימרק; August 17, 1946 – December 4, 2000) was an Israeli basketball player. He played for the Israeli Basketball Premier League, and for the Israeli national basketball team.

== Biography ==
Neumark's hometown was Netanya, Israel. He was 1.98 m (6 ft 6 in) tall.

Neumark started his basketball career at Maccabi Netanya. He played for 15 years in the Israeli Basketball Premier League. He played for Maccabi Tel Aviv, Maccabi Haifa, and Betar Tel Aviv.

He played for the Israeli national basketball team in the 1972 Pre-Olympic Basketball Tournament, 1969 European Championship for Men, 1970 Asian Games Basketball Championship (winning the silver medal), and 1973 European Championship for Men.

Neumark died at 54 years old from lung cancer. His funeral was in Moshav Avihayil, in central Israel, where he lived.
