= David Kaminsky =

Israeli basketball player (born 1938)

David Kaminsky דוד קמינסקי
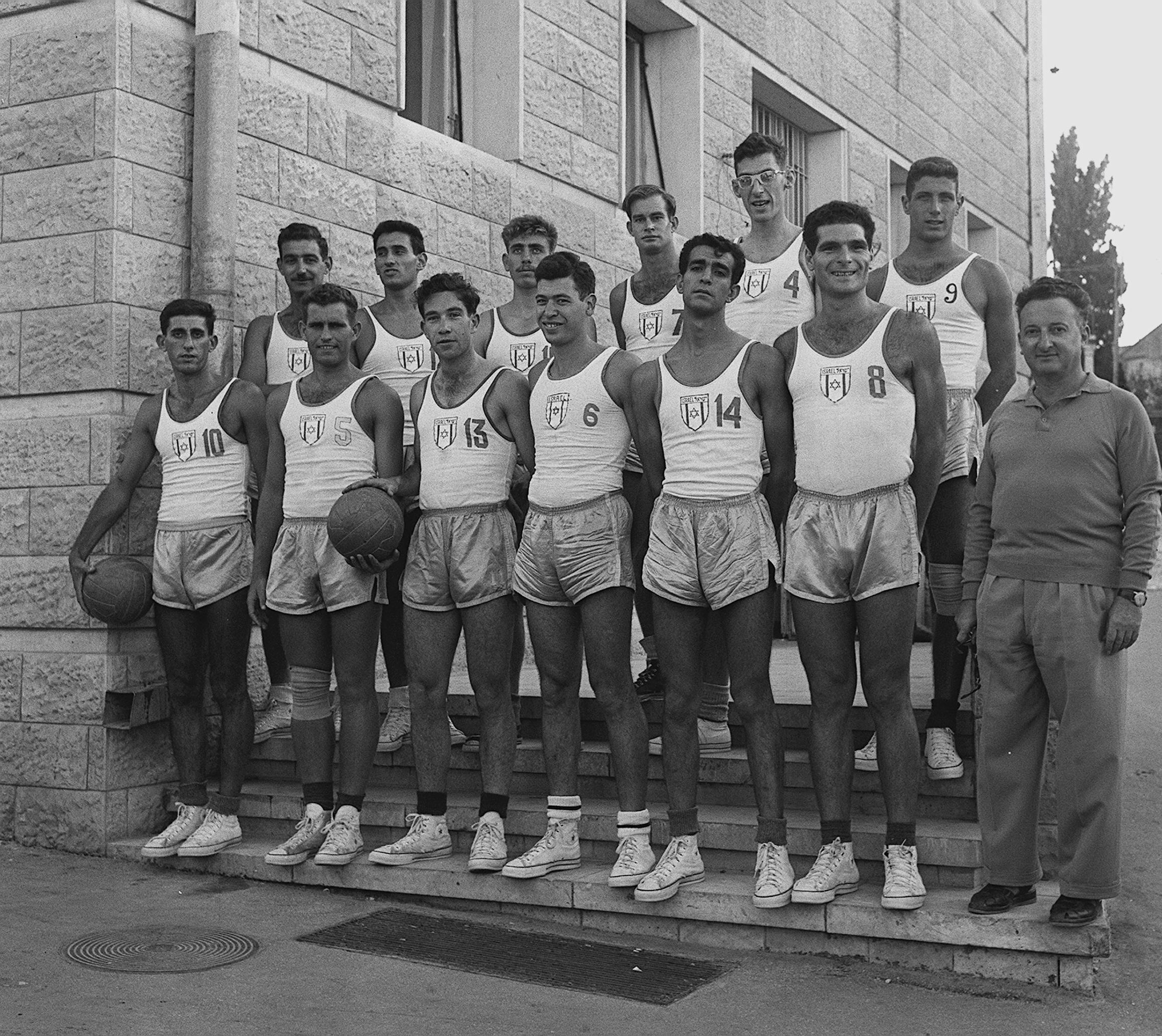
- Kaminsky (second row, second from the left), with the Israeli national basketball team, 1960

Personal information
- Born: January 8, 1938 (age 88)
- Listed height: 1.83 m (6 ft 0 in)
- Position: Guard
Medals
Men's basketball
Representing Israel
Asian Games
Gold medal – first place	1966 Thailand

David Kaminsky (Hebrew: דוד קמינסקי; born January 8, 1938) is an Israeli former basketball player and coach. He played the guard position. Kaminsky played in the Israel Basketball Premier League, and for the Israel national basketball team.

== Biography ==
Kaminsky is 1.83 m (6 ft 0 in) tall. He grew up in Jerusalem, and enlisted in the Israel Defense Forces in 1956, and was in the 4th Battalion. He also worked as a bus driver, for a company that later merged with Egged.

Kaminsky played 14 seasons in the Israel Basketball Premier League for Hapoel Jerusalem, Hapoel Tel Aviv, and Betar Jerusalem. He also coached Maccabi Jerusalem, Hapoel Jerusalem, and Betar Jerusalem.

He played 88 games on the Israel national basketball team. Kaminsky competed for it in the 1959 European Championship for Men, 1961 European Championship for Men, 1965 European Championship for Men, 1966 Asian Games (winning a gold medal), 1967 European Championship for Men, 1959 European Championship for Men, and 1969 European Championship for Men.

Kaminsky worked in the insurance business after his retirement. He and his wife now live in Motza Illit in central Israel.
