= Haim Starkman =

Israeli basketball player

Haim Starkman חיים שטרקמן
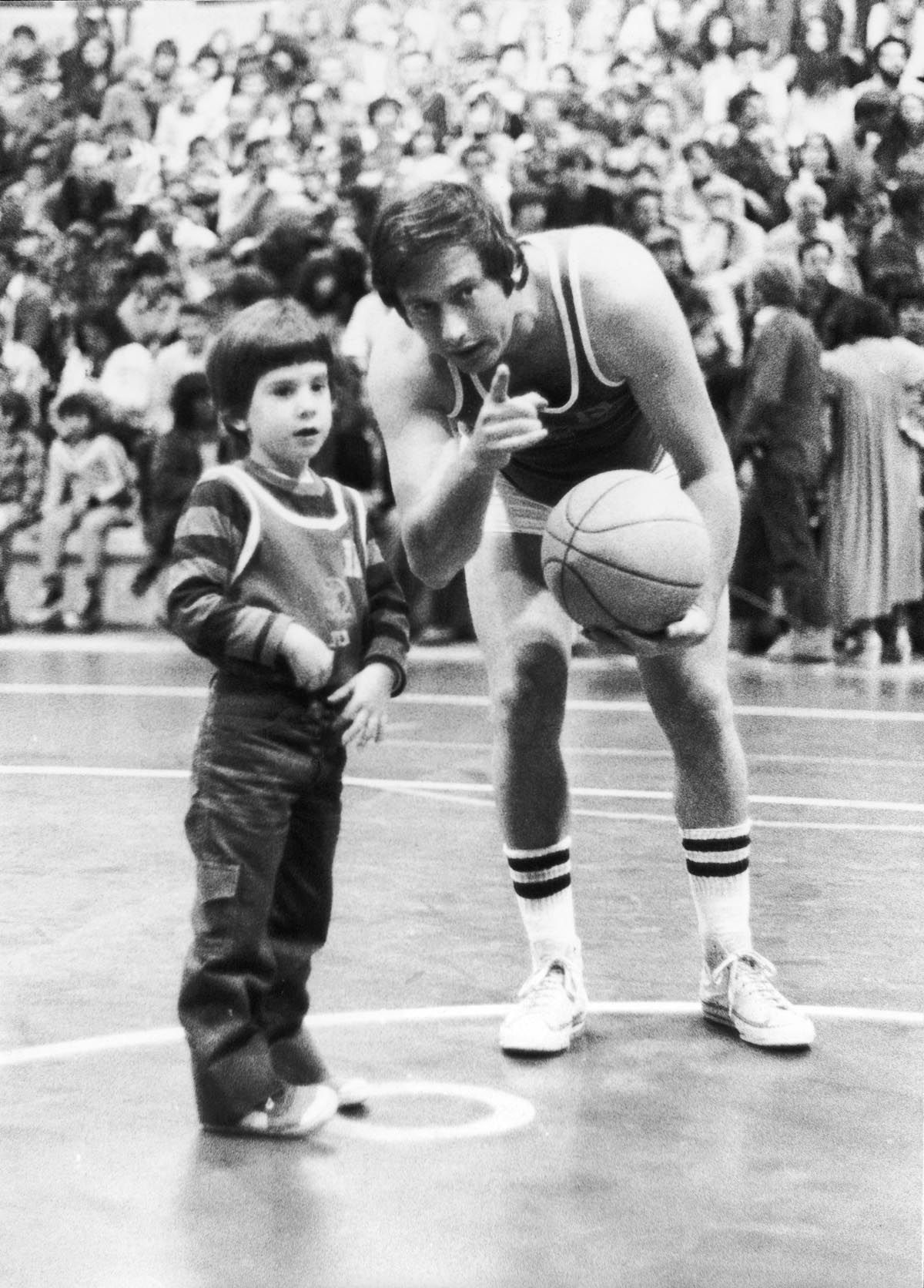

Personal information
- Born: July 11, 1944 (age 82) Jaffa, Palestine
- Listed height: 1.78 m (5 ft 10 in)
- Position: Guard
Medals
Men's basketball
Representing Israel
Asian Games
Gold medal – first place	1966 Thailand
Silver medal – second place	1970 Thailand

Haim Starkman (Hebrew: חיים שטרקמן; born in Jaffa, Palestine, July 11, 1944) is an Israeli former basketball player. He played the guard position. He played in the Israeli Basketball Premier League, and for the Israeli national basketball team.

== Biography ==
Starkman is 1.78 m (5 ft 10 in) tall.

He played for 12 years in the Israeli Basketball Premier League for Maccabi Ramat Gan and Maccabi Tel Aviv (for whom Starkman was captain). He later coached in the league, for Maccabi Tel Aviv and Maccabi Ramat Gan. He is a member of the Maccabi Tel Aviv Hall of Fame.

Starkman played on the Israeli national basketball team in the 1964 European Olympic Qualifying Tournament for Men, 1966 Asian Games Basketball Championship (winning a gold medal), 1967 European Championship for Men, 1968 European Olympic Qualifying Tournament for Men, 1969 European Championship for Men, 1970 Asian Games Basketball Championship (winning a silver medal), and 1971 European Championship for Men.

After his basketball career, Starkman worked in the insurance industry as an insurance agent. As of 1999, his brother Ike (Yitzhak) Starkman owned 45% of a Nasdaq public company that owned a California restaurant chain Jerry's Famous Deli, with 11 branches in and around Los Angeles, specializing in Jewish delicacies.
