= John Willis (basketball) =

American-Israeli basketball player

John Willis ג'ון וויליס
Personal information
- Born: September 23, 1952 (age 74) Newark, New Jersey
- Listed height: 6 ft 8 in (2.03 m)
- Listed weight: 225 lb (102 kg)

Career information
- High school: Manville High School
- College: Bloomsburg University
- Position: Forward/Center

John Willis (Hebrew: ג'ון וויליס; born September 23, 1952) is an American-Israeli former basketball player. He played the Forward/Center position. He played for ten seasons in the Israeli Basketball Premier League, and also played for the Israeli national basketball team.

== Biography ==
Willis attended Bloomsburg University ('74), and played for the Bloomsburg Huskies from 1971 to 1974. He holds school records for points in a game (48), rebounds in a season (389; 1973–74) and career field goal percentage (54.4). He also ranks fourth in school history in career rebounds (839), and sixth on the Huskies' all-time scoring list with 1,467 points.

He was named to the 1972 and 1973 Eastern College Athletic Conference Basketball All-East Division Second Team. He was 1973–74 All-Pennsylvania State Athletic Conference East Division First Team. He had his jersey retired, and was inducted into the Bloomsburg University Men's Basketball Hall of Fame in 1990.

He played for ten seasons in the Israeli Basketball Premier League for Hapoel Tel Aviv, Hapoel Haifa, Hapoel Holon, and Macabee Rishon LeZion.

He also played for the Israel men's national basketball team, competing in the 1981 FIBA European Championship for Men, 1983 FIBA European Championship for Men, 1984 FIBA European Olympic Qualifying Tournament for Men, and 1985 FIBA European Championship for Men.
