= Itamar Marzel =

Israeli basketball player (born 1949)

Itamar Marzel איתמר מרזל
Personal information
- Born: May 16, 1949 (age 77) Israel
- Listed height: 1.90 m (6 ft 3 in)
- Position: Point guard

Career highlights
- 1974 Asian Games gold medal

Itamar Marzel (Hebrew: איתמר מרזל; born May 16, 1949) is an Israeli former basketball player. He played the point guard position. He played in the Israeli Premier Basketball League, and for the Israel national basketball team.

== Biography ==
Marzel was born in Israel, and grew up on Kibbutz Yagur. He is 1.85 m tall.

He played 13 seasons in the Israeli Premier Basketball League, for Hapoel Gilboa/Afula, Hapoel Haifa, Hapoel Gvat, Hapoel Tel Aviv, and Hapoel Yagur. Marzel also played for the Israel national basketball team in the 1969 European Championship for Men, 1971 European Championship for Men, 1972 Pre-Olympic Basketball Tournament, 1973 European Championship for Men, 1975 European Championship for Men, 1976 European Olympic Qualifying Tournament for Men, 1977 European Championship for Men, and 1980 European Olympic Qualifying Tournament for Men.
