= Shimon Shelah =

Israeli basketball player (1932–2026)

Personal information
- Native name: שמעון שלח
- Nationality: Israeli
- Born: 19 March 1932 Wilno, Poland (now Vilnius, Lithuania)
- Died: 6 August 2026 (aged 94)

Sport
- Sport: Basketball

Shimon Shelah (Hebrew: שמעון שלח; 19 March 1932 – 6 August 2026) was an Israeli basketball player and coach.

As a player he played most of his career for Hapoel Tel Aviv and he competed with Israel national team in the men's tournament at the 1952 Summer Olympics, as well as Eurobasket 1953 (in which Israel ranked 5th) and in the 1954 FIBA World Championship, in which Israel ranked 8th. He played as a point guard.

As a coach he led Hapoel Tel Aviv to four Israeli Basketball Premier League titles during the 1960s. He also coached the national team to qualification to four Eurobasket tournaments, and to a gold medal at the 1966 Asian Games.

Shelah was married and had two children, one of whom is former footballer Amir Schelach. Shimon Shelach died on 6 August 2026, at the age of 94.
