= Pinhas Hozez =

Israeli basketball player

Pinhas Hozez פנחס חוזז
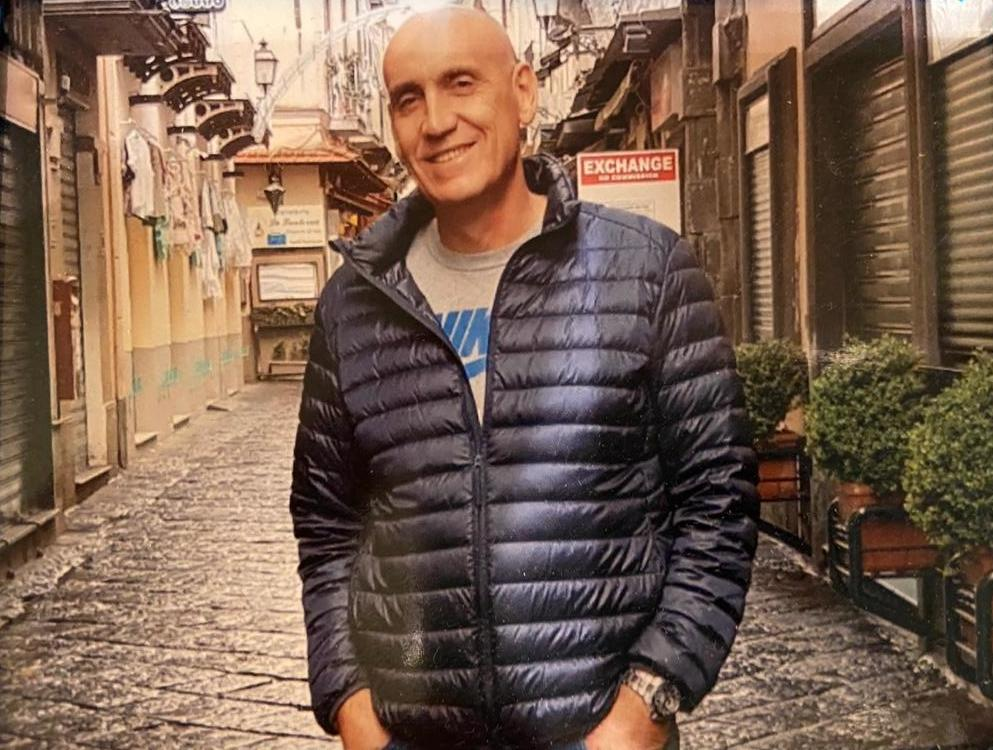

Personal information
- Born: September 8, 1957 (age 69) Tel Aviv, Israel
- Listed height: 6 ft 6 in (1.98 m)

Career information
- College: Portland (1979–1980)
- NBA draft: 1980: undrafted
- Playing career: 1974–1995
- Position: Forward

Pinhas Hozez (Hebrew: פנחס חוזז; born September 8, 1957) is an Israeli former basketball player. He played the forward position. He played in the Israeli Basketball Premier League and for the Israeli national basketball team.

== Biography ==
Hozez was born in Jaffa, Israel. He is 1.98 meters tall.

He attended the University of Portland. Hozez played basketball for the Portland Pilots in the 1979–80 season.

Hozez played in the Israeli Basketball Premier League. Between 1974 and 1995 he competed for Israeli teams Hapoel Tel Aviv, Beitar Tel Aviv, Elitzur Ramla, Hapoel Haifa, and Bnei Herzliya Basket.

He also played for the Israeli national basketball team. Hozez competed in the 1974 FIBA European Championship for Junior Men, 1977 FIBA European Championship for Men, 1979 FIBA European Championship for Men, 1980 FIBA European Olympic Qualifying Tournament for Men, and 1981 FIBA European Championship for Men.
