= Avigdor Moskowitz =

Israeli basketball player

Avigdor Moskowitz אביגדור מוסקוביץ
Personal information
- Born: February 4, 1953 (age 73) Givat Brenner
- Position: Point guard

Career history
- 1968–1976: Hapoel Givat Brenner
- 1976–1977: Hapoel Tel Aviv
- 1977–1978: Hapoel Givat Brenner
- 1978–1986: Hapoel Ramat Gan
- 1986–1988: Beitar Tel Aviv

Career highlights
- 1974 Asian Games gold medal; EuroBasket 1979 silver medal

Avigdor Moskowitz (Hebrew: אביגדור מוסקוביץ; born 4 February 1953) is a former Israeli basketball player, playing as a point guard.

He was a member of the Israeli national basketball team, which won a gold medal at 1974 Asian Games after defeating South Korea 92–85 in a final match. He represented his country four times in the European Championships and in 1979 he won a silver medal.
