= Ami Shelef =

Israeli basketball player (1936–1988)

Ami Shelef עמי שלף
Personal information
- Born: September 20, 1936 Haifa, Palestine
- Died: December 27, 1988 (aged 52)
- Listed height: 1.96 m (6 ft 5 in)
- Position: Center
Medals
Men's basketball
Representing Israel
Asian Games
Gold medal – first place	1966 Thailand

Ami Shelef (Hebrew: עמי שלף; September 20, 1936 – December 24, 1988) was an Israeli basketball player and coach. He played the center position. He played in the Israel Basketball Premier League, and for the Israeli national basketball team.

== Biography ==
Shelef was born in Haifa, Mandatory Palestine. He was 1.96 m (6 ft 5 in) tall.

== Sports career ==
Shelef played in the Israel Basketball Premier League for Hapoel Givat Brenner and Hapoel Tel Aviv.

Shelef competed for the Israeli national basketball team. He played in the 1961 European Championship for Men, 1963 European Championship for Men, 1965 European Championship for Men, and 1966 Asian Games Basketball Championship (winning a gold medal).

After retiring as an active player, Shelef worked as a physical education teacher in Be'er Sheva, and coached Hapoel Petah Tikva and Hapoel Tel Aviv. His sons Uri Shelef and Gur Shelef also played in the Israel Basketball Premier League, and for the Israeli national basketball team.

He died of cancer at 52 years of age.
