= Igal Volodarsky =

Igal Volodarsky יגאל וולדרסקי
Personal information
- Born: June 12, 1936
- Died: June 15, 1977 (aged 41)
Medals
Men's basketball
Representing Israel
Asian Games
| Gold medal – first place | 1966 Thailand |

Igal Volodarsky, also known as Igal Dar (Hebrew: יגאל וולדרסקי; June 12, 1936 – June 15, 1977), was an Israeli basketball player. He played in the Israel Basketball Premier League, and for the Israeli national basketball team.

== Biography ==
He played in the Israel Basketball Premier League. He competed for 21 years for Maayan Baruch, Ashdot Yaakov, Hapoel Haifa, Hapoel Nir David, Kiryat Haim, and Hapoel Megiddo.

He also played for the Israeli national basketball team. He competed in the 1959 European Championship for Men, 1961 European Championship for Men, 1964 European Olympic Qualifying Tournament for Men, 1965 European Championship for Men, 1966 Asian Games (winning a gold medal), 1967 European Championship for Men, and 1968 European Olympic Qualifying Tournament for Men.
