= Shamuel Nachmias =

Israeli former basketball player (born 1954)

Shamuel Nachmias שמואל נחמיאס
Personal information
- Born: October 19, 1954 (age 70); Tel Aviv, Israel
- Listed height: 1.96 m (6 ft 5 in)
- Position: Forward

Career highlights
- 1974 Asian Games gold medal

Shamuel (also Shmuel and Samuel) Nachmias (Hebrew: שמואל נחמיאס; born October 19, 1954) is an Israeli former basketball player. He played 13 seasons in the Israel Basketball Premier League, and played for the Israeli national basketball team.

== Biography ==
He was 1.96 m (6 ft 5 in) tall, and played the forward position. He played 13 seasons in the Israel Basketball Premier League for Hapoel Tel Aviv, Hapoel Galil Elyon, and Hapoel Givat Brenner.

He played for the Israeli national basketball team. He competed in the 1971 European Championship for Cadets, 1972 European Championship for Junior Men, the 1974 Asian Games (winning a gold medal), and the 1977 European Championship for Men.
