= Chaim Zlotikman =

Israeli basketball player

Chaim Zlotikman חיים זלוטיקמן
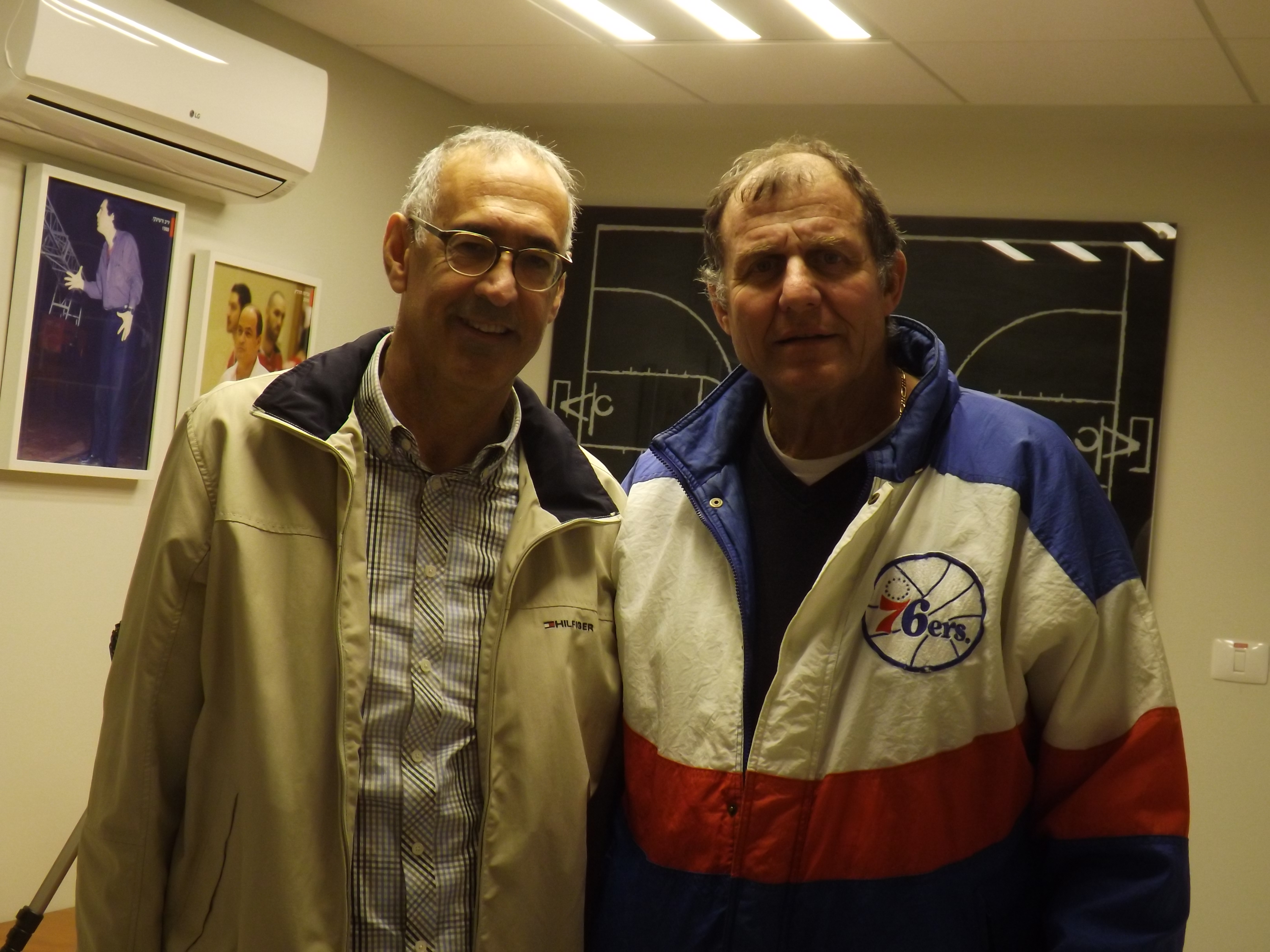
- Zlotikman (on the left)

Personal information
- Born: March 17, 1957 (age 69) Tel Aviv, Israel
- Listed height: 6 ft 3 in (1.91 m)

Career information
- Playing career: 1975–1995
- Position: Shooting guard

Chaim Zlotikman (Hebrew: חיים זלוטיקמן; also "Haim"; born March 17, 1957) is an Israeli former professional basketball player. He played the shooting guard position. He scored 5,812 career points, 10th-most in Israel Basketball Premier League history, and also played for the Israeli national basketball team.

== Biography ==
Zlotikman was born in Tel Aviv, Israel. He was 1.93 meters tall.

He played for Hapoel Givatayim, Hapoel Tel Aviv, Maccabi Rishon LeZion, Hapoel Holon, and Hapoel Haifa for 19 seasons, from 1975 to 1995, in the Israel Basketball Premier League. He scored 5,812 career points, 10th-most in Israel Basketball Premier League history.

Zlotikman played for the Israeli national basketball team. He played in the 1976 FIBA European Championship for Junior Men, 1981 FIBA European Championship for Men, 1983 FIBA European Championship for Men, 1984 FIBA European Olympic Qualifying Tournament for Men, and 1985 FIBA European Championship for Men.

== See also ==
- Israeli Premier League Statistical Leaders
- Sports in Israel
