= Mooley Avishar =

Israeli basketball player

Mooley Avishar שמואל אבישר
Personal information
- Born: May 13, 1947 (age 79)
- Listed height: 6 ft 5 in (1.96 m)

Career information
- College: Long Island University
- Position: Forward

Career highlights
- 1974 Asian Games gold medal

Mooley Avishar (also "Muli" and "Shmuel"; nicknamed "Moo"; Hebrew: שמואל אבישר; born May 13, 1947) is an Israeli former basketball player. He played the forward position. Avishar played in the Israeli Basketball Premier League, and for the Israeli national basketball team.

== Biography ==
Avishar is 6 feet 5 inches (196 cm) tall. He has two daughters.

He attended Long Island University, after originally coming to the United States to attend Adelphi University. Avishar played for the LIU Brooklyn Blackbirds in 1970–71.

Avishar played in the Israeli Basketball Premier League. He competed for Hapoel Haifa, Maccabi Tel Aviv, Hapoel Tel Aviv, and Beitar Tel Aviv.

He played for the Israeli national basketball team. Avishar competed in the 1968 European Olympic Qualifying Tournament for Men, and in the 1972 Pre-Olympic Basketball Tournament.
