= Yehuda Wiener-Gafni =

Israeli basketball player (born 1930)

Yehuda Wiener-Gafni יהודה וינר-גפני
Personal information
- Born: 7 January 1930 Katowice, Poland
- Listed height: 5 ft 8.4 in (1.74 m)

Yehuda Wiener-Gafni (also "Ernst"; יהודה וינר; born 7 January 1930) is an Israeli former Olympic basketball player.

== Basketball career ==
Wiener-Gafni was a member of the sports club Maccabi Tel Aviv, located in Tel Aviv, Israel. He was a guard, and was 1.75 meters tall. He competed for Israel at the 1952 Summer Olympics in Helsinki, at the age of 22, in Men's Basketball. The Israeli team came in tied for 20th, after losing 57-47 to the Philippines, and 54-52 to Greece. Wiener-Gafni was also on the Israel national basketball team in the 1954 FIBA World Basketball Championship for Men, in which Israel came in 8th out of 12 teams.
