= Haim Hazan (basketball) =

Israeli basketball player (1937–1994)

Haim Hazan חיים חזן
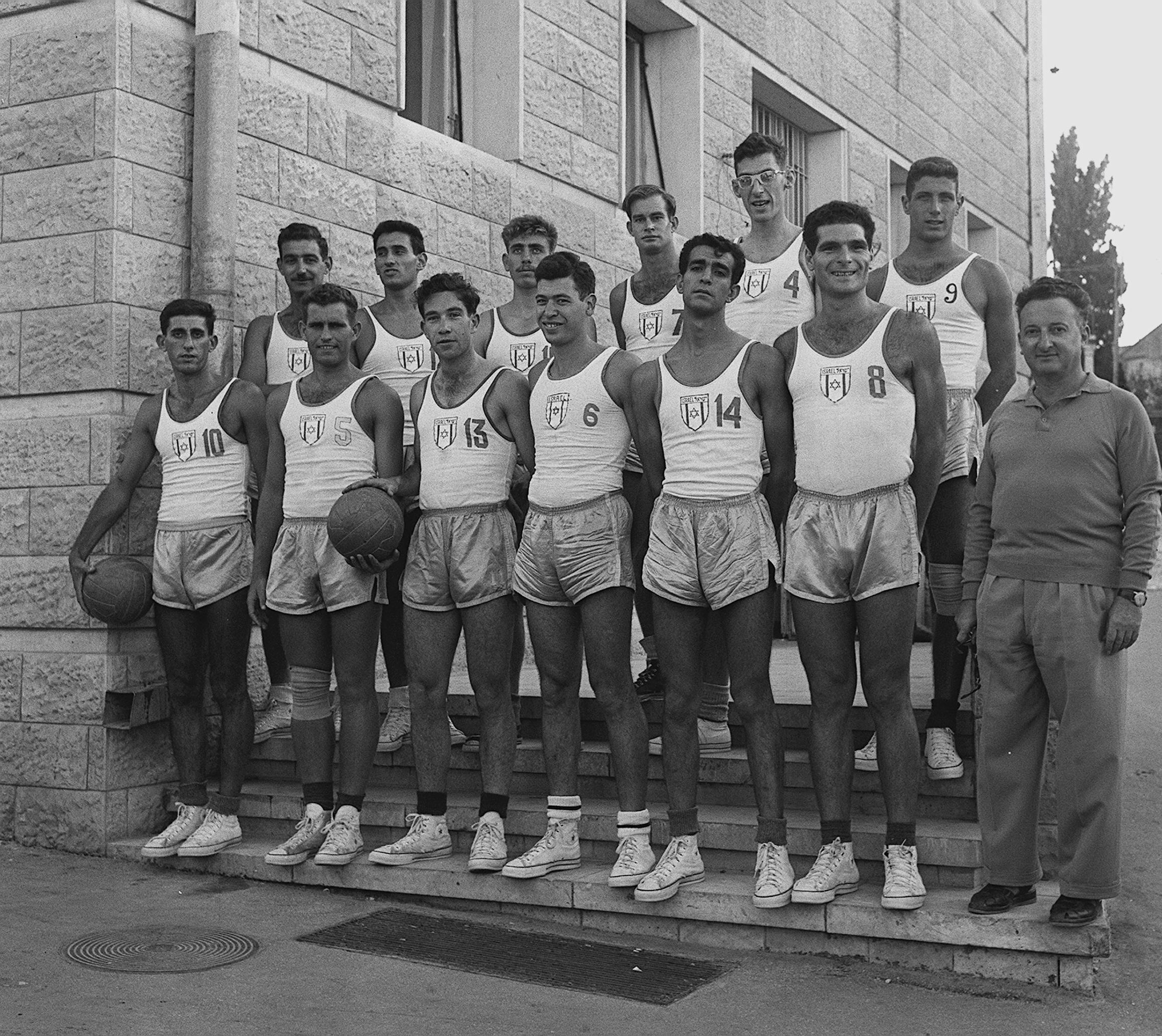
- Haim Hazan (first row, second player in from the right-hand side), with the Israeli national basketball team, 1960

Personal information
- Born: January 20, 1937 Jaffa, Palestine
- Died: February 21, 1994 (aged 57)
- Listed height: 1.89 m (6 ft 2 in)

Career history
- 1954–1966: Hapoel Tel Aviv

Haim Hazan (Hebrew: חיים חזן; January 20, 1937 – February 21, 1994) was an Israeli basketball player. He played the guard position. He played in the Israel Basketball Premier League, and for the Israeli national basketball team.

== Biography ==
Hazan was born in Jaffa in Palestine, and grew up playing in the Hassan-Bek youth club in the Manshiya neighborhood of Jaffa. He was 1.89 m (6 ft 2 in) tall. When Hazan was 19 years old, American basketball coach Elmer Ripley said: "This is the little one, he will be huge. He will be the best basketball player in Israel."

He played 11 seasons in the Israel Basketball Premier League for Hapoel Tel Aviv from 1954 to 1966. Hazan had leg surgery in both April and May 1965, leading to the end of his career at 27 years of age. He later coached Hapoel Tel Aviv and other basketball teams. His son Erez played 13 seasons in the league.

Hazan played in 50 games for the Israeli national basketball team. He also played while he was in the army for the Israel Defense Forces basketball team. He played for the national team in the 1959 European Championship for Men, 1960 Pre-Olympic Basketball Tournament, 1961 European Championship for Men, 1963 European Championship for Men, 1964 European Olympic Qualifying Tournament for Men, and 1965 European Championship for Men.

During and after his basketball career, Hazan was a professional glassblower.
