= Reuben Perach =

Israeli basketball player (1933–2020)

Personal information
- Native name: ראובן פרח
- Nationality: Israeli
- Born: 29 April 1933
- Died: 1 May 2020 (aged 87)

Sport
- Sport: Basketball

Reuben Perach (Hebrew: ראובן פרח; 29 April 1933 – 1 May 2020) was an Israeli basketball player. He competed in the men's tournament at the 1952 Summer Olympics.
