= Zacharia Ofri =

Israeli basketball player (1932–2018)

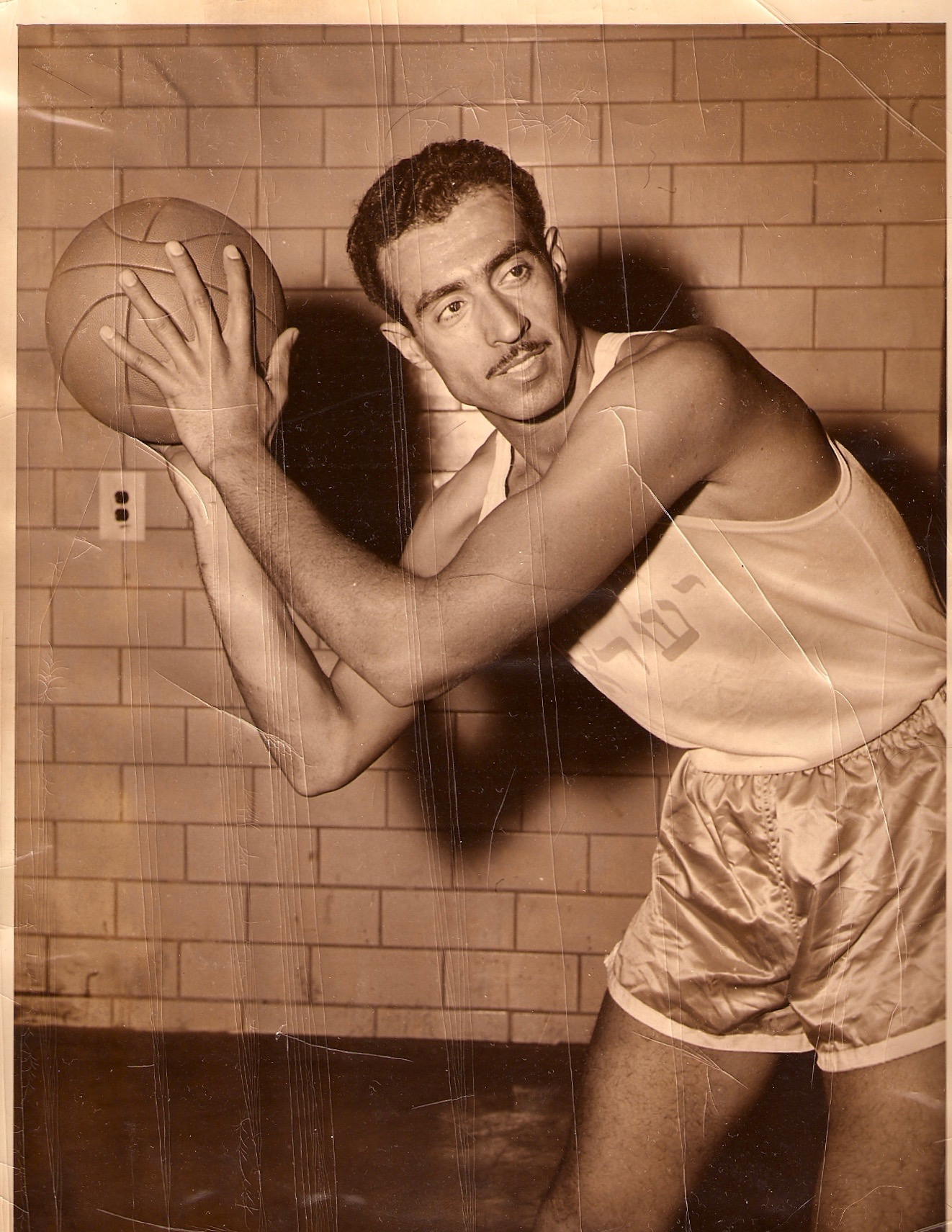
- Zacharia Ofri (captain of Israeli National Basketball Team) at Helsinki Olympics 1952

Personal information
- Native name: זכריה עופרי
- Nationality: Israeli
- Born: 7 August 1932
- Died: 9 March 2018 (aged 85)

Sport
- Sport: Basketball

Zacharia (Zekaarya) Ofri (Hebrew: זכריה עופרי; 7 August 1932 – 9 March 2018) was an Israeli basketball player. He was captain of the Israeli National team that competed in the men's tournament at the 1952 Summer Olympics as well as in the 1953 European Cup in Moscow (name transliterated as Afari) and the 1954 World Cup in Rio de Janeiro (name transliterated as Afri)

Ofri was also captain of the Maccabi Tel Aviv basketball team in Israel.

The Israeli national team was unable to play in the 1956 Olympics because of the Sinai War (Ofri served in the Tank Corps). In 1957, as a compensation for missing the Olympic games, the team went on an exhibition tour in the United States. Ofri was offered a scholarship to play on the NYU basketball (and soccer) teams, and completed his degree in education at NYU.

Ofri lived in Yonkers, New York and taught mathematics at Lincoln High School in Yonkers, New York, until 1983 when he moved back to Israel. In 2013 he was inducted into the Israeli Basketball Hall of Fame.

His daughter is the physician and writer Danielle Ofri.

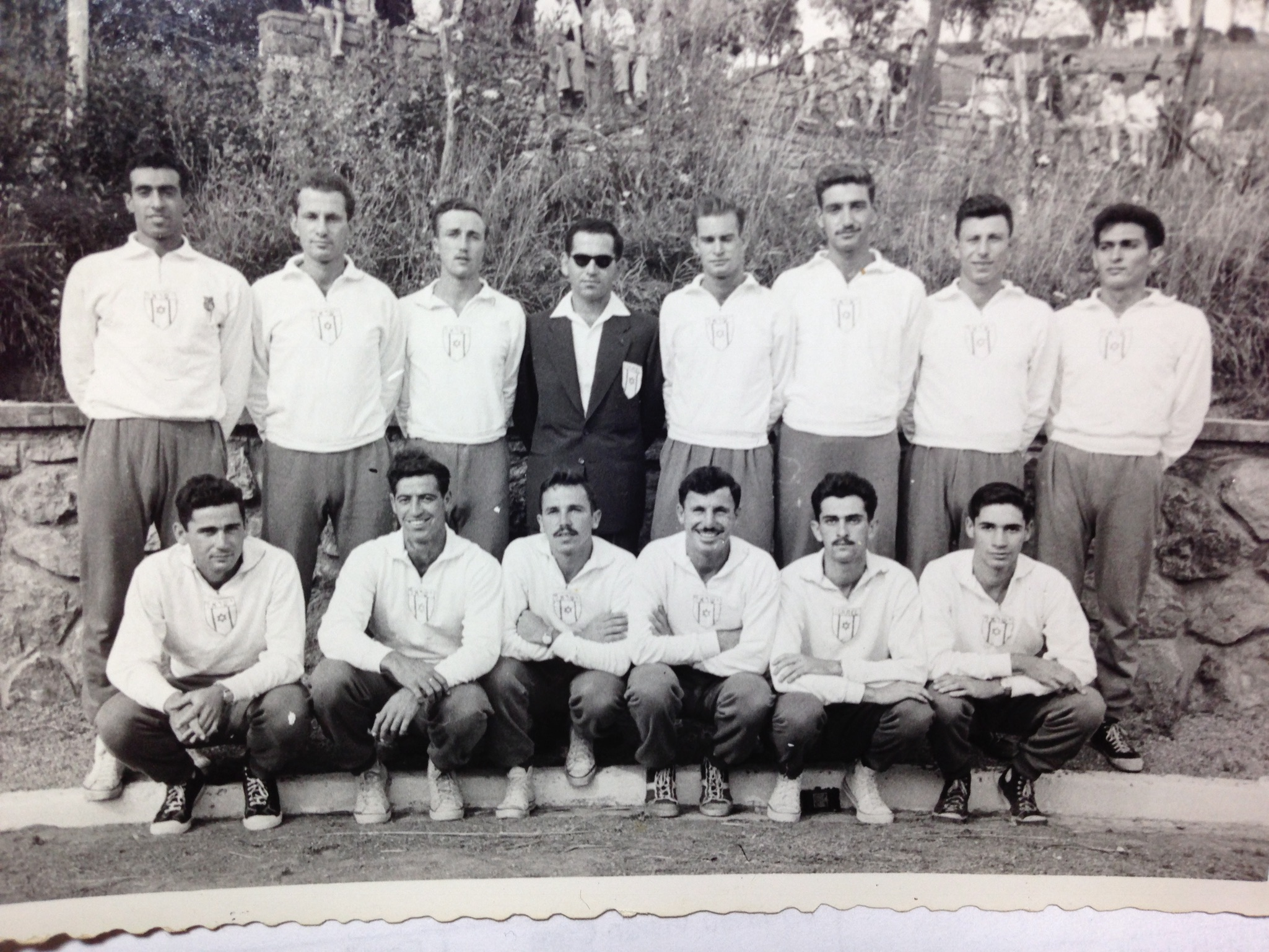
Israeli Olympic Basketball team 1952 (Zacharia Ofri, standing at far left)

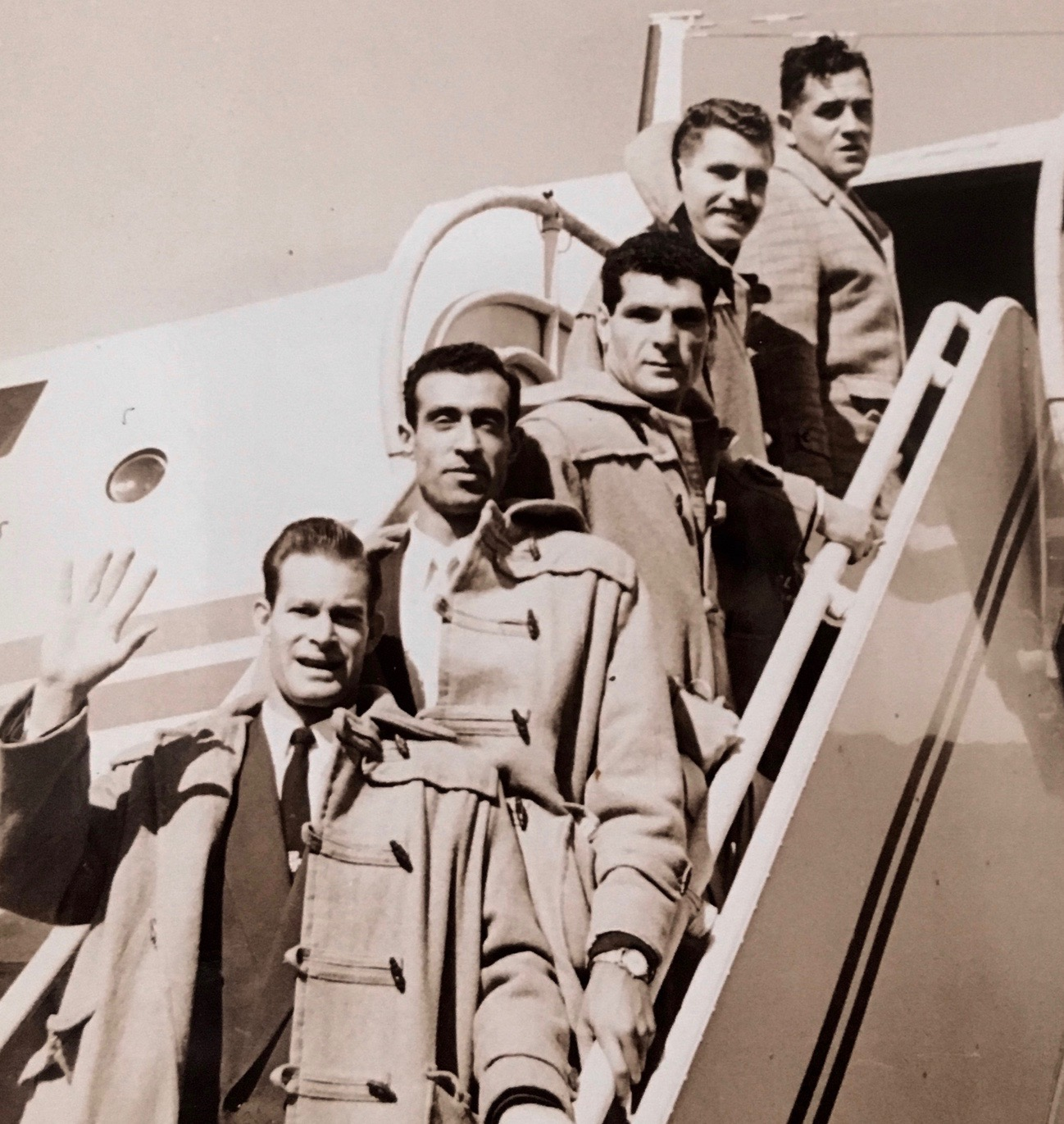
Israeli National Basketball team on tour, 1957 (Zacharia Ofri 2nd from bottom)

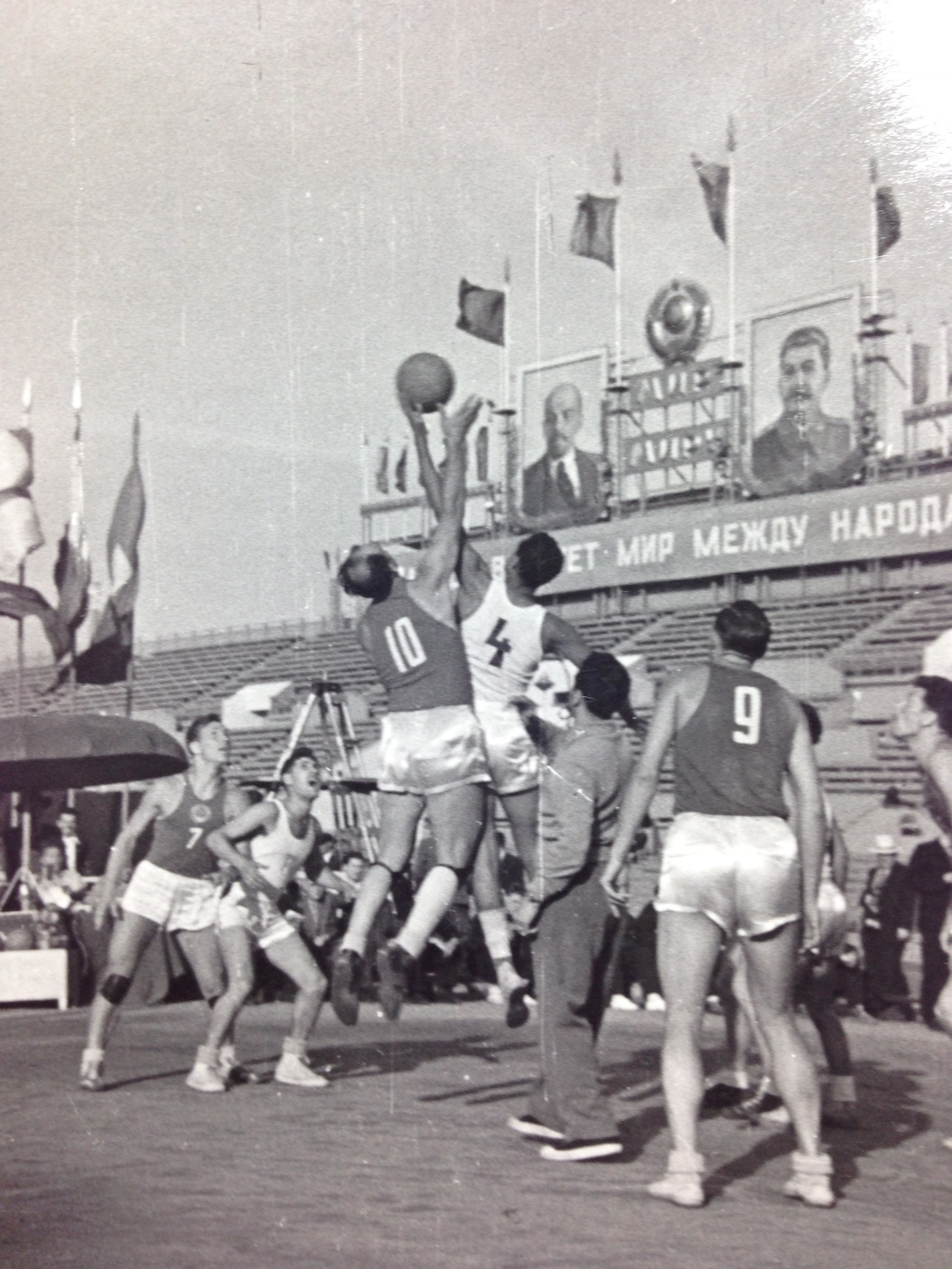
European Cup (Basketball) Moscow, 1953. (Zacharia Ofri, #4, tipping off ball)
