= Amos Lin =

Israeli basketball player (1933–2020)

Personal information
- Native name: עמוס לין
- Nationality: Israeli
- Born: 2 July 1933
- Died: 21 September 2020 (aged 87)

Sport
- Sport: Basketball

Amos Lin (Hebrew: עמוס לין; 2 July 1933 – 21 September 2020) was an Israeli basketball player. He competed in the men's tournament at the 1952 Summer Olympics.
