= Moshe Mizrahi (basketball) =

Israeli basketball player

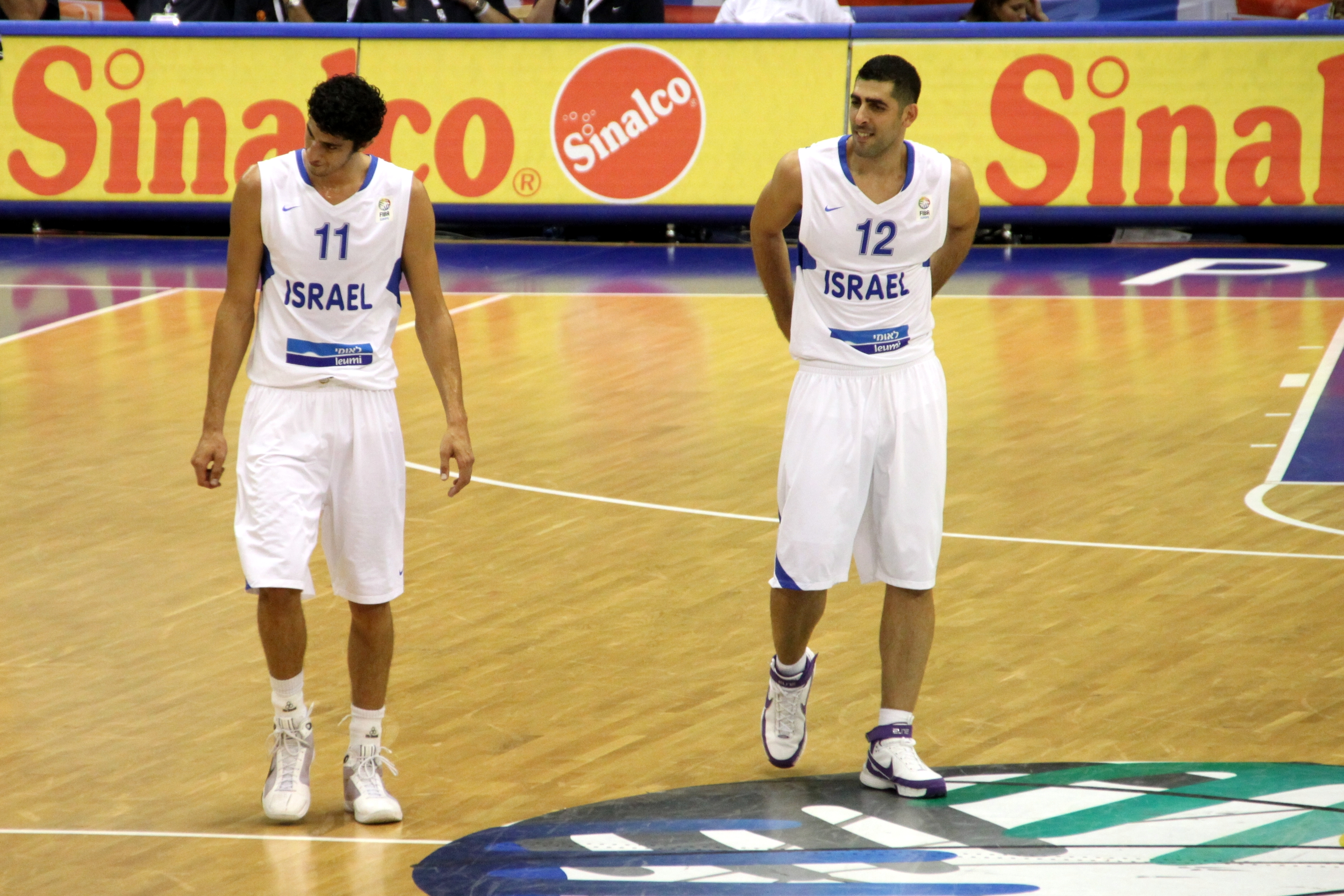
- Lior Eliyahu and Moshe Mizrahi (right), EuroBasket 2009, Poland

Personal information
- Born: April 8, 1980 (age 46) Holon, Israel
- Listed height: 6 ft 8 in (2.03 m)
- Position: Small forward

Career highlights
- 2000 Under-20 FIBA European Championship silver medal; 2003 Israeli All Star Game

Moshe Mizrahi (Hebrew: משה מזרחי; born April 8, 1980) is an Israeli basketball player. He plays small forward.

Mizrahi was a member of the Israeli U-16, U-18, U-20, and U-21 National Teams, won the silver medal at the 2000 Under-20 FIBA European Championship, and played at the World Under-21 Championship. He has also been a member of the Israel national basketball team, and played for Israel at the 2001 and 2005 European Basketball Championships.

In addition to playing on the Israeli national basketball team, he has played for teams in leagues in Israel, Ukraine, and France, specifically for Hapoel Holon, Hapoel Jerusalem, Hapoel Galil Elyon, Azovmash Mariupol, Elitzur Ashkelon, Bnei Hasharon, Paris-Levallois Basket, Maccabi Haifa, and Maccabi Ashdod. Mizrahi also played in the 2003 Israeli All Star Game.

== Biography ==
Mizrahi was born in Holon, Israel. He is 2.02 m (6 ft 8 in) tall.

== Basketball career ==
Mizrahi was a member of the Israeli U-16, U-18, U-20, and U-21 National Teams (and played at the World Under-21 Championship), and has been a member of the Israel national basketball team. He played for Israel at the 2001 and 2005 European Basketball Championships. He played on Hapoel Holon youth teams in Israel as he was growing up.

Mizrahi played with Hapoel Holon from the 1997–1998 season through their 2000-2001 championship season. He won the silver medal at the 2000 Under-20 FIBA European Championship.

He played for Hapoel Jerusalem from the 2001–2002 season through their 2003-2004 championship season, during which they won the 2003–04 ULEB Cup. Mizrahi played in the 2003 Israeli All Star Game.

Mizrahi played for Hapoel Galil Elyon for the 2004–2005 season. He averaged 13.1 points per game.

In April 2005 Mizrahi signed with Azovmash Mariupol in Ukraine, and played for them until he returned to Israel for the 2005–2006 season, playing for Elitzur Ashkelon. He played for Bnei Hasharon for the 2006–07 season, played for Paris-Levallois Basket in the Ligue Nationale de Basket Pro A in France for the 2007–2008 season, and returned to Israel to play for Maccabi Haifa for the 2008–09 season and their 2009-2010 championship season.

He started playing for Hapoel Jerusalem in the 2010–2011 season. He then played for Maccabi Ashdod of the Israeli Basketball Premier League.
