= Daniel Levy (basketball) =

Israeli basketball player (1930–2020)

Personal information
- Native name: דניאל לוי
- Nationality: Israeli
- Born: 29 October 1930
- Died: 1 June 2020 (aged 89)

Sport
- Sport: Basketball

Daniel Levy (Hebrew: דניאל לוי; 29 October 1930 – 1 June 2020) was an Israeli basketball player. He competed in the men's tournament at the 1952 Summer Olympics.
