= Dan Erez =

Israeli basketball player

Personal information
- Native name: דן ארז
- Nationality: Israeli
- Born: 28 May 1933
- Died: November 2015 (aged 82)

Sport
- Sport: Basketball

Dan Erez (Hebrew: דן ארז; 28 May 1933 – November 2015) was an Israeli basketball player. He competed in the men's tournament at the 1952 Summer Olympics.
