= Mordechai Hefez =

Israeli basketball player (1930–2010)

Personal information
- Native name: מרדכי חפץ
- Nationality: Israeli
- Born: 17 February 1930
- Died: 17 March 2010 (aged 80)

Sport
- Sport: Basketball

Mordechai Hefez (Hebrew: מרדכי חפץ; 17 February 1930 – 17 March 2010) was an Israeli basketball player. He competed in the men's tournament at the 1952 Summer Olympics.
