= Menahem Degani =

Israeli basketball player (1927–2018)

Personal information
- Native name: מנחם דגני
- Nationality: Israeli
- Born: 18 August 1927 Tel Aviv
- Died: 23 November 2018 (aged 91)

Sport
- Sport: Basketball

Menahem Degani (Hebrew: מנחם דגני; 18 August 1927 – 23 November 2018) was an Israeli basketball player. He competed in the men's tournament at the 1952 Summer Olympics.
