= Danny Franco =

Israeli basketball coach (born 1973)

Danny Franco דני פרנקו
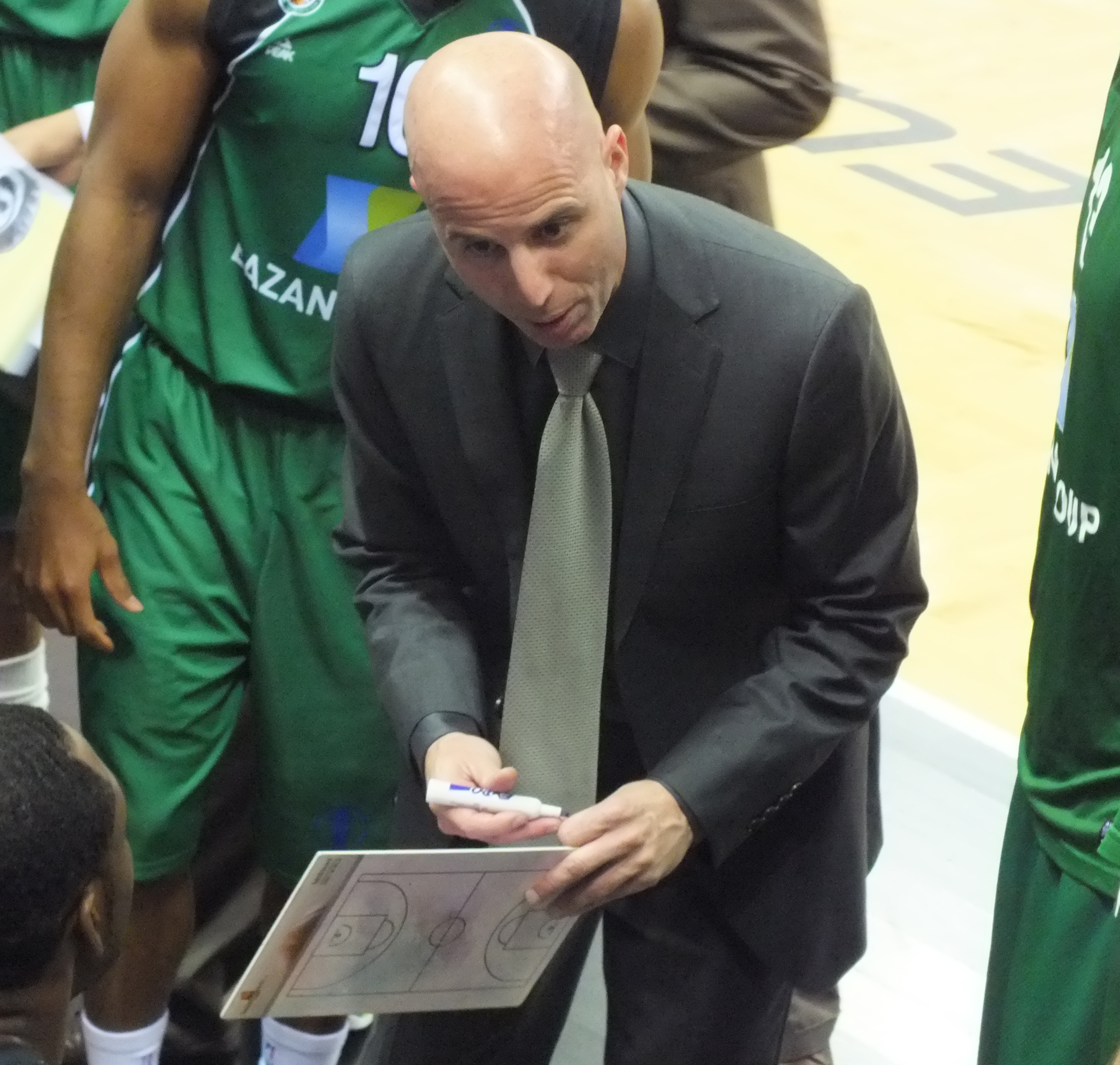

Śląsk Wrocław
- Position: Head coach
- League: PLK

Personal information
- Born: 5 December 1973 (age 52) Holon, Israel
- Coaching career: 1996–present

Career history
- 1996–1997: Hapoel Tel Aviv (assistant)
- 2000–2002: Hapoel Galil Elyon (assistant)
- 2002–2003: Ironi Ramat Gan (assistant)
- 2004–2006: Ironi Ramat Gan
- 2006–2007: Hapoel Afula
- 2007–2008: Hapoel Galil Elyon
- 2008–2009: Hapoel Holon
- 2010–2011: Hapoel Holon
- 2011–2013: Barak Netanya
- 2013–2014: Maccabi Haifa
- 2014–2016: Hapoel Jerusalem
- 2017–2019: Hapoel Tel Aviv
- 2019–2020: Ironi Nahariya
- 2021–2024: Hapoel Tel Aviv
- 2025: Hapoel Holon
- 2026–present: Śląsk Wrocław

Career highlights
- As head coach: Israeli League Coach of the Year (2015); Israeli League champion (2015); Israeli Cup winner (2009)

Danny Franco (Hebrew: דני פרנקו; born 5 December 1973) is an Israeli basketball coach, who is the head coach of Śląsk Wrocław of the Polish Basketball League (PLK).

Franco began his coaching path as coach for Hapoel Tel Aviv's youth teams, and during that time he also coached the Israeli youth national team. Among the many teams Franco has coached are: Ironi Ramat Gan, Hapoel Afula, Hapoel Gilboa Galil (as Hapoel Galil Elyon), Hapoel Holon with whom he won the Israeli State Cup in 2009, Barak Netanya, and Maccabi Haifa, Hapoel Jerusalem, Ironi Nahariya and Hapoel Tel Aviv.

== Beginning of career and youth coach ==
Franco grew up in Holon, where he played for Hapoel Holon's youth team. At age 16, he participated in an instructor's course at the Wingate Institute, and was invited by legendary coach Yehoshua Rozin to coach in the Hapoel Tel Aviv youth division. Over the years, Franco also coached the Blich High School team, in the Israeli High School's top division. Franco led Blich to three championship games - in 2005, 2008, and 2013. Among the players Franco coached at Blich are, Lior Eliyahu and Elishay Kadir. Franco led the Israel National Cadet Team (until age 16) at the 2007 FIBA Europe Under-16 Championship in Greece, and brought his team to the number 11 place finish. In 2008, Franco led the National Israeli Youth Team (until age 18) at the 2008 FIBA Europe Under-18 Championship, where Israel finished in tenth place. In 2009, at the FIBA Europe Under-18 Championship hosted in France, Israel finished in 15th place. Franco continued to coach the team in 2010.

== Professional league career ==
=== Assistant coach ===
Franco began his professional league coaching in the 1996–97 season as the assistant coach at the beginning of the season under Meir Kaminsky and, later in the season, under his replacement, Edni Dagan. From 2000 to 2002, Franco worked as assistant coach at Hapoel Gilboa Galil under Erez Edelstein and Shai Minister. In the 2002–03 season, Franco was assistant coach at Ironi Ramat Gan, first under Austoich, and later under Hanoch Mintzh.

=== Ironi Ramat Gan ===
In the 2004–05 season, Franco for the first time in his career was head coach of a professional team when he coached Ironi Ramat Gan in the Israeli National League. In that season, Franco managed to bring the team back up to the Israeli Super League after beating Hapoel Afula five games in five games in the playoff finals of the National League. Franco continued to coach the team through the 2005–06 season in the Super League.

=== Hapoel Afula ===
In preparation for the 2006–07 season, Franco was appointed as head coach of Hapoel Afula Basketball Club which was admitted into the Israeli Super League that year. Among those who played that season for Franco were Goni Izraeli, Avi Sukar, Yehu Orland, and Tunji Awojobi, Jermaine Hall, and Rich Meltzer. The team ended the season in sixth place with a balance of 11 wins versus 16 losses and Goni Izraeli was chosen as talent discovery of the year.

=== Hapoel Gilboa Galil ===
In December 2007, Franco was appointed as coach for Hapoel Gilboa Galil to replace Eli Kaneti. Franco won three out of nine games. Franco was succeeded by Oded Kattash.

=== Hapoel Holon ===
At the beginning of the 2008–09 season, Franco was appointed as head coach of Hapoel Holon which won the championship the previous season. The team budget significantly dropped after the coach and the owner left. Franco built the team back up using the foreigners Deron Washington, Luis Flores, Curtis Withers, and Brian Tolbert and the Israelis Lior Lifshitz, Yehu Orland, and Uri Kokia. In February 2009, Holon won the first Israeli State Cup in the club's history after a razor-thin, one-point difference, win over Maccabi Haifa in the final game. Franco received many accolades for his accomplishments with Holon.

=== Barak Netanya ===
Note: subcategory requires expansion.

=== Maccabi Haifa ===
Franco coached Maccbi Haifa during the 2013–14 season following Brad Greenberg's departure for Hapoel Jerusalem and brought the team to the national final against current EuroLeague champion Maccabi Tel Aviv. After the season Franco too left Haifa to replace Greenberg as the head coach of the Jerusalem team.

=== Hapoel Jerusalem ===
In June 2014, Franco was signed by Hapoel Jerusalem succeeding Brad Greenberg. This landing marks his first job at one of Israel's "Big Two" with the other being Maccabi Tel Aviv. Donta Smith, then Israeli Super League MVP, who played for Franco in Haifa, signed with Jerusalem as well.

=== Hapoel Tel Aviv ===
On June 6, 2017, Franco became the new head coach of Hapoel Tel Aviv. That season, Franco led Hapoel to the Israeli League Final Four for the first time in 13 years. On June 29, 2018, Franco signed a one-year contract extension with Hapoel.

In his second season with Hapoel, he led the team to the 2019 Israeli League Playoffs, where they eventually were eliminated by Maccabi Tel Aviv in the Quarterfinals. On June 3, 2019, Franco parted ways with Hapoel.

=== Ironi Nahariya ===
On June 16, 2019, Franco was named Ironi Nahariya new head coach.

=== Śląsk Wrocław ===
On June 19, 2026, he signed with Śląsk Wrocław of the Polish Basketball League (PLK).

== Personal life ==
Franco is married and lives in Giv'atayim. His oldest daughter was born in 2008.
