= List of 2016–17 EuroLeague transactions =

This is a list of all personnel changes for the 2016 EuroLeague off-season and 2016–17 EuroLeague season (until 28 February 2017).

== Retirements ==
The following players who played in the 2015–16 Euroleague, and played more than three EuroLeague seasons, retired.

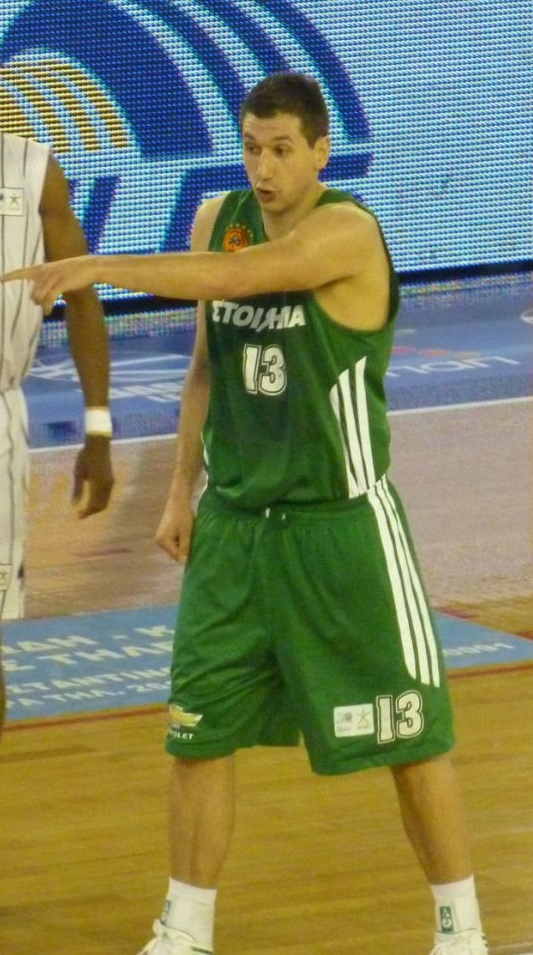
Dimitris Diamantidis with Panathinaikos

Date	Name	EuroLeague Team(s) and played (years)	Age	Notes	Ref.
April 19	(Greece) Dimitris Diamantidis	(Greece) Panathinaikos (2004–2016)	36	3× EuroLeague champion EuroLeague MVP; 2x EuroLeague Final Four MVP; EuroLeague Basketball Legend	
January 9	(Argentina) Pablo Prigioni	(Spain) Baskonia (2003–2009, 2011–2012, 2016–2017); (Spain) Real Madrid (2009–2011)	39	2× All-EuroLeague Second Team	

== Managerial changes ==
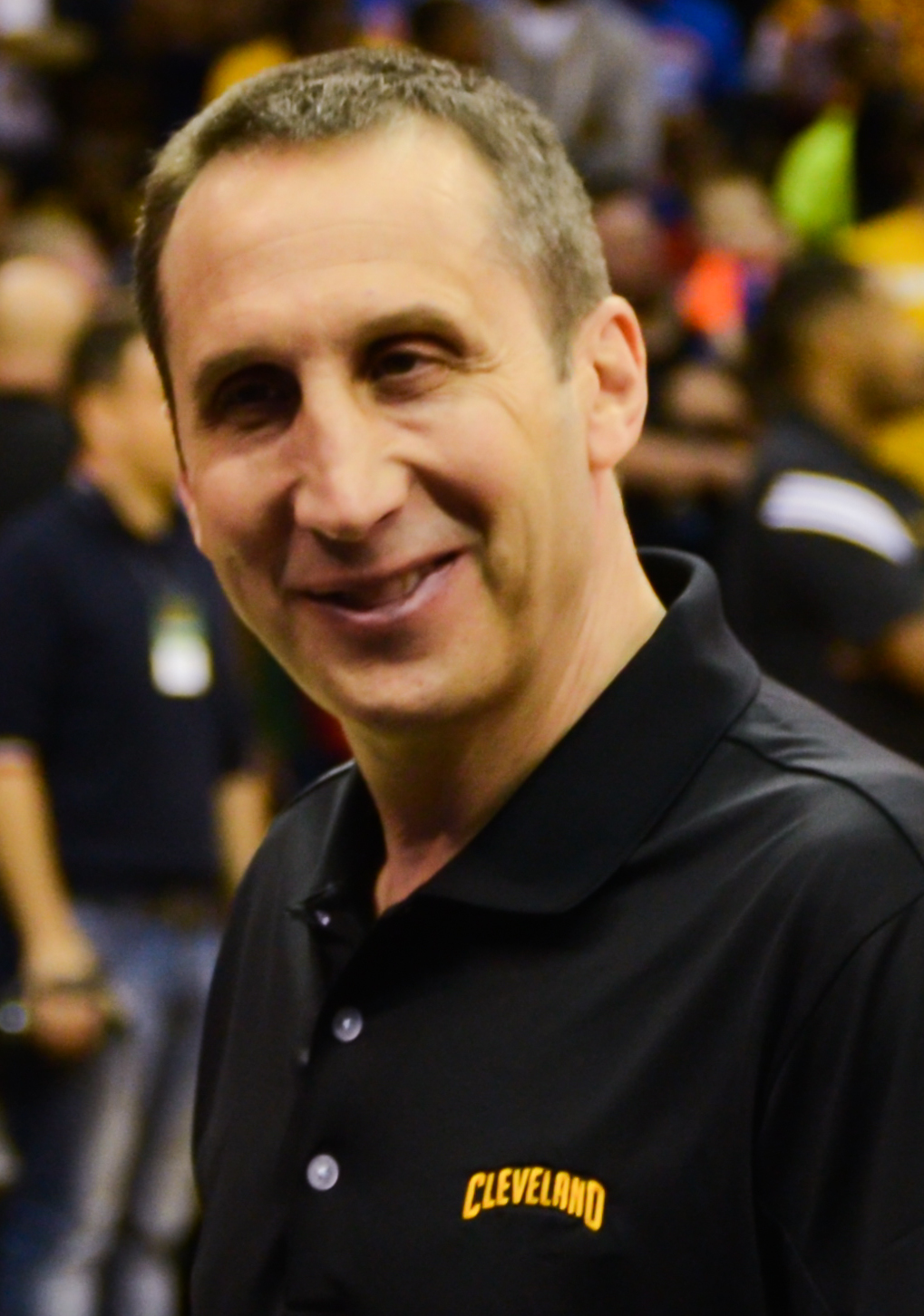
David Blatt was announced as new Darüşşafaka head coach.

Team	Outgoing manager	Manner of departure	Date of vacancy	Position in table	Replaced with	Date of appointment
(Turkey) Darüşşafaka Doğuş	(Turkey) Oktay Mahmuti	Mutual consent	31 May 2016	Pre-season	(Israel) David Blatt	1 June 2016
(Israel) Maccabi Tel Aviv	(Croatia) Žan Tabak	End of contract	8 June 2016	Pre-season	(Israel) Erez Edelstein	9 June 2016
(Spain) Baskonia	(Croatia) Velimir Perasović	Signed with Anadolu Efes	14 June 2016	Pre-season	(Spain) Sito Alonso	8 July 2016
(Turkey) Anadolu Efes	(Turkey) Ahmet Çakı	End of contract	21 June 2016	Pre-season	(Croatia) Velimir Perasović	21 June 2016
(Spain) FC Barcelona Lassa	(Spain) Xavi Pascual	Sacked	27 June 2016	Pre-season	(Greece) Georgios Bartzokas	8 July 2016
(Greece) Panathinaikos Superfoods	(Greece) Argyris Pedoulakis	Resigned	18 October 2016	3rd (1–1)	(Spain) Xavi Pascual	22 October 2016
(Israel) Maccabi Tel Aviv	(Israel) Erez Edelstein	Sacked	23 October 2016	13th (0–2)	(Israel) Rami Hadar	23 October 2016
(Israel) Maccabi Tel Aviv	(Israel) Rami Hadar	Resigned	16 December 2016	11th (5–7)	(Latvia) Ainars Bagatskis	24 December 2016

== Player movements ==
^	Denotes a player who has won at least one EuroLeague award in his career

=== Between two EuroLeague teams ===
Date	Player	From	To	Contract years	Ref.
June 13	(Germany) Maik Zirbes	(Serbia) Crvena zvezda mts	(Israel) Maccabi Tel Aviv	2	
June 13	(United States) Quincy Miller^	(Serbia) Crvena zvezda mts	(Israel) Maccabi Tel Aviv	1+1	
June 18	(United States) Brad Wanamaker	(Germany) Brose Baskets	(Turkey) Darüşşafaka Doğuş	2	
June 20	(Turkey) Birkan Batuk	(Turkey) Anadolu Efes	(Turkey) Darüşşafaka Doğuş	2	
June 30	(Serbia) Nenad Krstić^	(Turkey) Anadolu Efes	(Turkey) Galatasaray Odeabank	1	
July 4	(United States) Mike James	(Spain) Baskonia	(Greece) Panathinaikos	1	
July 12	(Greece) Ioannis Bourousis^	(Spain) Baskonia	(Greece) Panathinaikos	2	
July 12	(United States) Jon Diebler	(Turkey) Anadolu Efes	(Turkey) Galatasaray Odeabank	1	
July 12	(Israel) Alex Tyus	(Turkey) Anadolu Efes	(Turkey) Galatasaray Odeabank	1	
July 15	(Serbia) Miroslav Raduljica	(Greece) Panathinaikos	(Italy) EA7 Emporio Armani Milan	2	
July 16	(United States) Charles Jenkins	(Italy) EA7 Emporio Armani Milan	(Serbia) Crvena zvezda mts	2	
July 20	(Serbia) Ognjen Kuzmić	(Greece) Panathinaikos	(Serbia) Crvena zvezda mts	3	
July 24	(United States) K. C. Rivers	(Spain) Real Madrid	(Greece) Panathinaikos	1+1	
July 26	(Georgia (country)) Ricky Hickman^	(Turkey) Fenerbahçe	(Italy) EA7 Emporio Armani Milan	2	
July 28	(Jordan) Ahmet Düverioğlu	(Turkey) Anadolu Efes	(Turkey) Fenerbahçe	3	
July 29	(Brazil) Augusto Lima	(Spain) Real Madrid	(Lithuania) Žalgiris	1	
August 2	(France) Fabien Causeur	(Spain) Baskonia	(Germany) Brose Baskets	2	
September 8	(Montenegro) Milko Bjelica	(Turkey) Darüşşafaka Doğuş	(Serbia) Crvena zvezda mts	2	

=== To a EuroLeague team ===
Date	Player	From	To	Contract years	Ref.
May 30	(France) Léo Westermann	(France) Limoges CSP	(Lithuania) Žalgiris	1+1	
June 7	(United States) D. J. Seeley	(Spain) Herbalife Gran Canaria	(Israel) Maccabi Tel Aviv	1+1	
June 12	(Italy) Awudu Abass	(Italy) Acqua Vitasnella Cantù	(Italy) EA7 Emporio Armani Milan	1	
June 14	(United States) Sonny Weems^	(United States) Philadelphia 76ers	(Israel) Maccabi Tel Aviv	2	
June 14	(Russia) Alexandr Karpukhin	(Russia) Zenit St.Petersburg	(Russia) UNICS	1	
June 16	(Canada) Khem Birch	(Turkey) Uşak Sportif	(Greece) Olympiacos	2	
June 17	(Italy) Davide Pascolo	(Italy) Dolomiti Energia Trento	(Italy) EA7 Emporio Armani Milan	1	
June 17	(Russia) Semen Antonov	(Russia) Nizhny Novgorod	(Russia) CSKA Moscow	2+1	
June 17	(Russia) Pavel Antipov	(Russia) Zenit St.Petersburg	(Russia) UNICS	1	
June 21	(Turkey) Berk Demir	(Turkey) Pertevniyal	(Turkey) Anadolu Efes	3	
June 23	(Germany) Johannes Voigtmann	(Germany) Fraport Skyliners	(Spain) Baskonia	1	
June 23	(Germany) Louis Olinde	(Germany) Hamburg Towers	(Germany) Brose Baskets	4	
June 28	(Slovenia) Alen Omić	(Spain) Herbalife Gran Canaria	(Turkey) Anadolu Efes	2	
June 30	(United States) Austin Daye	(Bahrain) Al Manama	(Turkey) Galatasaray Odeabank	1	
July 2	(United States) Chris Singleton	(Russia) Lokomotiv Kuban	(Greece) Panathinaikos	1+1	
July 2	(Russia) Evgeny Voronov	(Russia) Lokomotiv Kuban	(Russia) UNICS	1+1	
July 4	(United States) James Augustine	(Russia) Khimki	(Russia) CSKA Moscow	1+1	
July 7	(Italy) Simone Fontecchio	(Italy) Granarolo Bologna	(Italy) EA7 Emporio Armani Milan	2	
July 7	(Slovenia) Zoran Dragić	(Russia) Khimki	(Italy) EA7 Emporio Armani Milan	2	
July 12	(United States) Deon Thompson	(Germany) Bayern Munich	(Turkey) Galatasaray Odeabank	1	
July 13	(Latvia) Dairis Bertāns	(Spain) Dominion Bilbao Basket	(Turkey) Darüşşafaka Doğuş	2	
July 14	(United States) Deshaun Thomas	(United States) Austin Spurs	(Turkey) Anadolu Efes	1+1	
July 14	(France) Adrien Moerman	(Turkey) Banvit	(Turkey) Darüşşafaka Doğuş	1+1	
July 15	(United States) Erick Green	(United States) Reno Bighorns	(Greece) Olympiacos	2	
July 15	(United States) Anthony Randolph^	(Russia) Lokomotiv Kuban	(Spain) Real Madrid	1	
July 15	(Brazil) Rafa Luz	(Brazil) Flamengo	(Spain) Baskonia	2	
July 15	(Canada) Kevin Pangos	(Spain) Herbalife Gran Canaria	(Lithuania) Žalgiris	1	
July 20	(Croatia) Dontaye Draper	(Russia) Lokomotiv Kuban	(Spain) Real Madrid	1	
July 20	(Spain) Víctor Claver	(Russia) Lokomotiv Kuban	(Spain) FC Barcelona Lassa	3	
July 21	(United States) James Anderson	(United States) Sacramento Kings	(Turkey) Darüşşafaka Doğuş	2	
July 22	(United States) Tyler Honeycutt	(Russia) Khimki	(Turkey) Anadolu Efes	1+1	
July 22	(France) Rodrigue Beaubois	(France) Strasbourg IG	(Spain) Baskonia	2	
July 23	(United States) Coty Clarke	(Puerto Rico) Capitanes de Arecibo	(Russia) UNICS	1	
July 25	(Germany) Maodo Lô	(United States) Columbia	(Germany) Brose Baskets	3	
July 25	(Turkey) Can Korkmaz	(Turkey) Muratbey Uşak Sportif	(Turkey) Galatasaray Odeabank	1	
July 26	(Montenegro) Tyrese Rice^	(Russia) Khimki	(Spain) FC Barcelona Lassa	2	
July 26	(Italy) Andrea Bargnani^	(United States) Brooklyn Nets	(Spain) Baskonia	2	
July 27	(United States) Russ Smith	(United States) Delaware 87ers	(Turkey) Galatasaray Odeabank	1	
July 28	(United States) James Nunnally	(Italy) Sidigas Avellino	(Turkey) Fenerbahçe	1+1	
August 1	(Greece) Pat Calathes	(Kazakhstan) Astana	(Greece) Panathinaikos	1	
August 2	(United States) Andrew Goudelock^	(United States) Houston Rockets	(Israel) Maccabi Tel Aviv	1	
August 3	(Turkey) Samet Geyik	(Turkey) Pınar Karşıyaka	(Turkey) Anadolu Efes	2	
August 3	(Israel) Joe Alexander	(Italy) Banca di Sardegna Sassari	(Israel) Maccabi Tel Aviv	1+1	
August 3	(Azerbaijan) Orhan Hacıyeva	(Turkey) Acıbadem Üniversitesi	(Turkey) Galatasaray Odeabank	1	
August 18	(United States) Victor Rudd^	(Russia) Nizhny Novgorod	(Israel) Maccabi Tel Aviv	1+1	
August 28	(United States) Bryce Cotton	(United States) Memphis Grizzlies	(Turkey) Anadolu Efes	1	
October 5	(Serbia) Petar Rakićević	(Serbia) Metalac	(Serbia) Crvena zvezda mts	3	
October 24	(United States) Nate Wolters	(Turkey) Beşiktaş	(Serbia) Crvena zvezda mts	1	
October 28	(United States) Chase Budinger	(United States) Phoenix Suns	(Spain) Baskonia	1	

=== Leaving a EuroLeague team ===
Date	Player	From	To	Ref.
May 23	(Serbia) Stefan Nastić	(Serbia) Crvena zvezda mts		
June 11	(United States) Darius Johnson-Odom	(Greece) Olympiacos	(Italy) Banco di Sardegna Sassari	
June 14	(Estonia) Siim-Sander Vene	(Lithuania) Žalgiris		
June 14	(Germany) Andreas Obst	(Germany) Brose Baskets	(Germany) Gießen 46ers	
June 18	(United States) Demetris Nichols	(Russia) CSKA Moscow		
June 20	(Turkey) Emircan Koşut	(Turkey) Anadolu Efes		
June 20	(Belarus) Anton Astapkovich	(Russia) CSKA Moscow	(Russia) Avtodor Saratov	
June 21	(Spain) Mamadou Diop	(Spain) Baskonia	(Belgium) Melco Ieper	
June 29	(Russia) Valeriy Likhodey	(Russia) UNICS	(Russia) Khimki	
June 30	(Latvia) Kaspars Vecvagars	(Lithuania) Žalgiris		
June 30	(Ukraine) Jerome Randle	(Lithuania) Žalgiris		
July 4	(Georgia (country)) Marquez Haynes	(Greece) Panathinaikos	(Italy) Umana Reyer Venezia	
July 6	(United States) Trevor Mbakwe	(Israel) Maccabi Tel Aviv	(Spain) Unicaja	
July 7	(Croatia) Dragan Bender	(Israel) Maccabi Tel Aviv	(United States) Phoenix Suns	
July 8	(Spain) Willy Hernangómez	(Spain) Real Madrid	(United States) New York Knicks	
July 10	(United States) Curtis Jerrells	(Turkey) Galatasaray Odeabank	(Israel) Hapoel Jerusalem	
July 13	(Spain) Sergio Rodríguez^	(Spain) Real Madrid	(United States) Philadelphia 76ers	
July 14	(Senegal) Maurice Ndour	(Spain) Real Madrid	(United States) New York Knicks	
July 14	(Latvia) Dāvis Bertāns	(Spain) Baskonia	(United States) San Antonio Spurs	
July 15	(Croatia) Dario Šarić	(Turkey) Anadolu Efes	(United States) Philadelphia 76ers	
July 15	(Greece) Georgios Papagiannis	(Greece) Panathinaikos	(United States) Sacramento Kings	
July 18	(Croatia) Oliver Lafayette	(Italy) EA7 Emporio Armani Milan	(Spain) Unicaja	
July 19	(Tunisia) Michael Roll	(Spain) Baskonia	(Turkey) Beşiktaş Sompo Japan	
July 21	(Czech Republic) Tomáš Satoranský	(Spain) FC Barcelona Lassa	(United States) Washington Wizards	
July 22	(Cameroon) D. J. Strawberry	(Greece) Olympiacos	(Turkey) Beşiktaş Sompo Japan	
July 23	(United States) Tarence Kinsey	(Serbia) Crvena zvezda mts	(Israel) Hapoel Jerusalem	
July 23	(Spain) Álex Abrines^	(Spain) FC Barcelona Lassa	(United States) Oklahoma City Thunder	
July 26	(Spain) Alberto Corbacho	(Spain) Baskonia	(Spain) Rio Natura Monbus	
July 26	(Serbia) Vasilije Micić	(Serbia) Crvena zvezda mts	(Turkey) Tofaş	
July 27	(Italy) Daniele Magro	(Italy) EA7 Emporio Armani Milan	(Italy) Giorgio Tesi Group Pistoia	
August 2	(United States) Reggie Redding	(Turkey) Darüşşafaka Doğuş	(Germany) Bayern Munich	
August 2	(Canada) Olivier Hanlan	(Lithuania) Žalgiris	(France) Le Mans Sarthe Basket	
August 3	(Greece) Vlado Janković	(Greece) Panathinaikos	(Spain) Valencia Basket	
August 3	(Croatia) Darko Planinić	(Spain) Baskonia	(Spain) Herbalife Gran Canaria	
August 31	(Serbia) Vladimir Štimac	(Serbia) Crvena zvezda mts	(Turkey) Beşiktaş Sompo Japan	
