= Rătești Solar Park =

Photovoltaic power stations in Romania

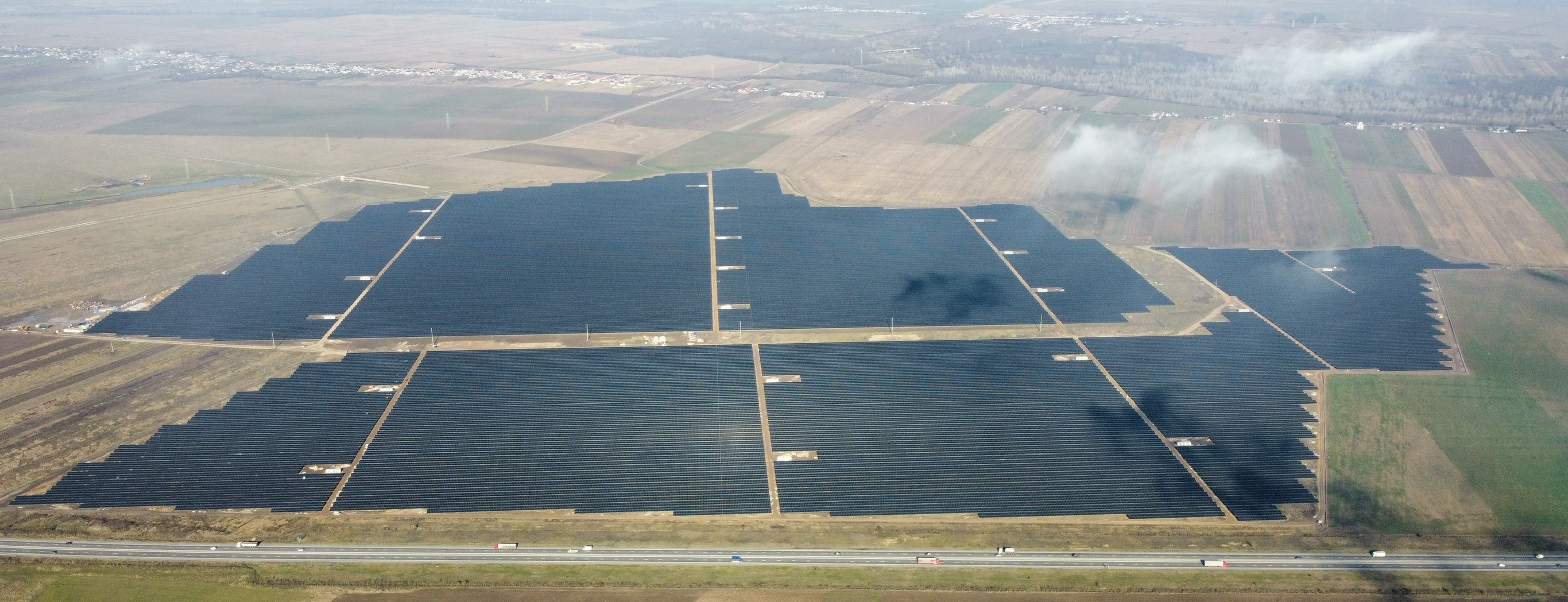
- Country: Romania
- Location: Rătești
- Coordinates: 44°42′4″N 25°10′55″E
- Status: Completed
- Commission date: 2023
- Construction cost: Over €100 million
- Owners: Econergy & Nofar Energy

Solar farm
- Type: Flat-panel PV

Power generation
- Units operational: 135,000
- Nameplate capacity: 155 MW

Rătești Solar Park is a large thin-film photovoltaic (PV) power system, built on a 170 ha (420 acres) plot of land located in Rătești in Romania. The solar park has around 135,000 state-of-the-art thin film PV panels for a total nameplate capacity of 155-megawatts, and was finished in October 2023. The solar park is expected to supply enough energy to power some 100,000 average homes. Over €100 million were invested for the project.

== See also ==
- Energy policy of the European Union
- Photovoltaics
- Renewable energy commercialization
- Renewable energy in the European Union
- Solar power in Romania
