= Matan Naor =

Israeli basketball player

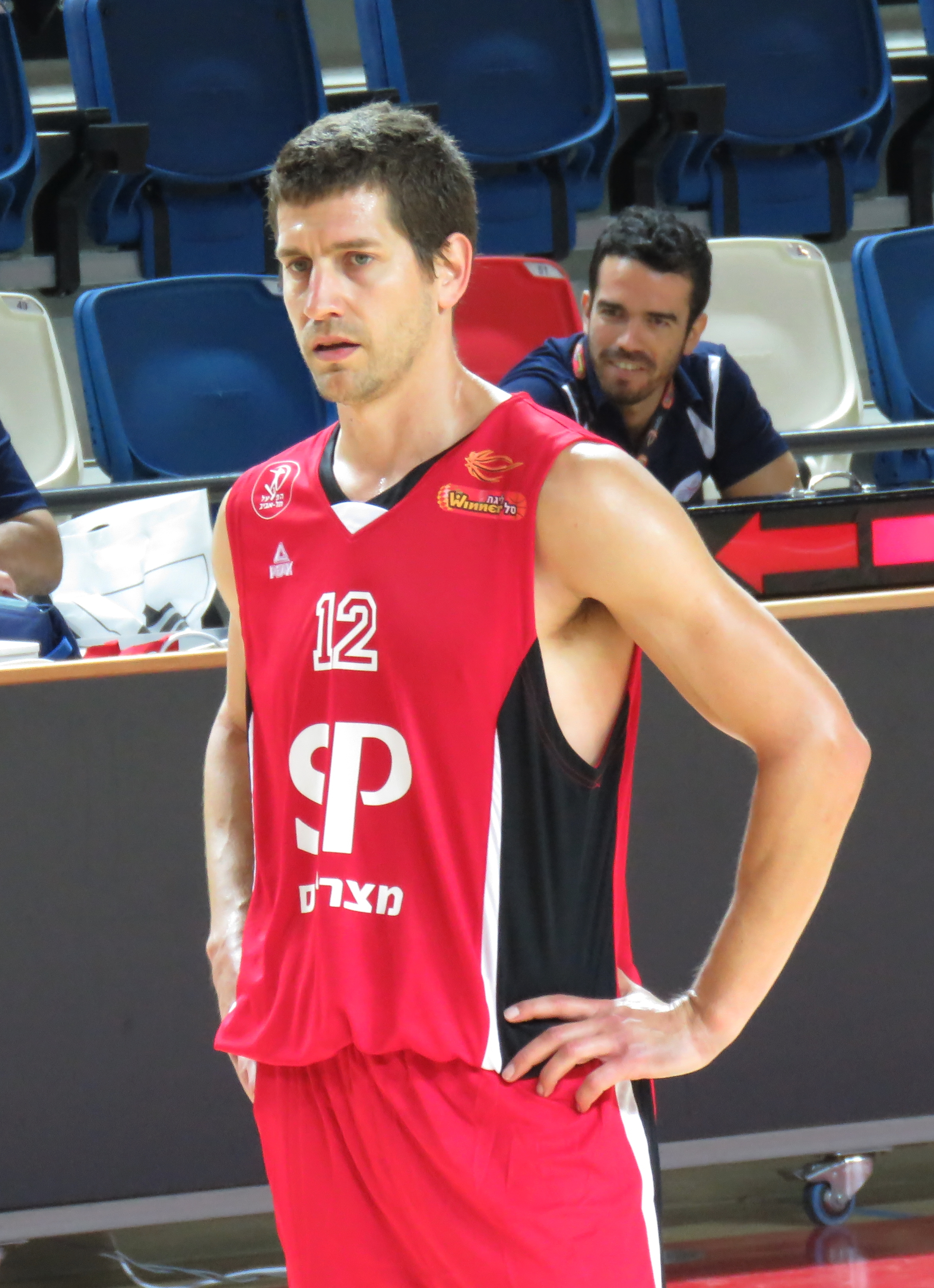
- Naor with Hapoel Tel Aviv in September 2015

Personal information
- Born: November 3, 1980 (age 46) Rehovot, Israel
- Listed height: 6 ft 4.7 in (1.95 m)
- Listed weight: 192 lb (87 kg)

Career information
- Playing career: 1997–2020
- Position: Shooting guard
- Number: 4, 12

Career history
- 1997–1999: Maccabi Rehovot
- 1999–2002: Ironi Ramat Gan
- 2002–2004: Hapoel Tel Aviv
- 2004–2007: Hapoel Jerusalem
- 2007–2009: Ironi Nahariya
- 2007–2017: Hapoel Tel Aviv
- 2017–2018: Elitzur Netanya
- 2018–2019: Hapoel Hevel Modi'in
- 2019–2020: Maccabi Hadera

Career highlights
- Israeli Cup winner (2007)

Matan Naor (Hebrew: מתן נאור; born 3 November 1980) is an Israeli former basketball player.

== Professional career ==
Naor grew up in the Maccabi's Rehovot youth league. He started playing in Irony Ramat Gan's Premier League in 2000.

2001 was a breakthrough season for Naor, playing in 28 games while training under Arik Shivek.

During the 2002 season, under the direction of Erez Edelstein, Naor took part in Ramat Gan's record season. The team reached the finals, but lost to Maccabi Tel Aviv 3–0 in the series. In the basketball National Cup Ramat Gan made the semi-finals, they were eliminated by Hapoel Jerusalem.

Naor signed to Hapoel Tel Aviv at the end of the season. That year, Naor played in the Israeli Basketball Premier League, and opened one game as part of its the starting lineup in the pre-European Basketball Championship held in Sweden.

Naor continued the following season with Hapoel Tel Aviv, and played a number of games in the Premier League and in Europe. However, Naor showed instability, which led to his benching and was later released from the national team ahead of the European Championship.

In the 2004/5 season Naor signed with Hapoel Jerusalem.

In the 2005/2006 season Naor continued in Jerusalem and was part of the team's roster where they got to the Cup Finals, the Final Four and the Finals in the league.

During the 2006/2007 season Naor played injured for a long period, during that time he missed the decisive stages of the National Cup, which his team won. Towards the end of the season Naor recovered, but wasn't fit enough to help his team in the Final Four where they lost to Macabi Tel Aviv. In June 2007, he left Jerusalem and signed a one-year contract with Ironi Nahariya.

After the qualifying campaign with the Israeli National team (summer 2008) in preparation for the European Basketball Championship, Naor took a break from basketball. After his return in early 2009, he returned to Ironi Nahariya.

After one season with Ironi Nahariya, Naor decided to join Hapoel OsishkinTel Aviv, advancing with them to the National League, and two seasons later to the Israeli Basketball Premier League. Naor is considered a symbol by fans, and served as the team's captain since joining.

On June 27, 2017, Naor split ways with Hapoel Tel Aviv after playing ten season with the club.

On July 3, 2017, Naor signed with Elitzur Netanya of the Liga Artzit, Naor won the Liga Artzit championship title with Netanya, earning a promotion to the Israeli National League.

In July 2018, Naor signed a one-year deal with Hapoel Hevel Modi'in, where he won the Liga Artzit championship and by that winning the title for two consecutive years.

On July 18, 2019, Naor signed with Maccabi Hadera for the 2019–20 season.

In the end of the 2019/20 season, Naor left professional basketball.
