= Hapoel Tel Aviv B.C. =

Basketball club in Israel

Hapoel Tel Aviv
- Nickname: Hapoel; The Reds; The Red Devils
- Leagues: Israeli Premier League; EuroLeague
- Founded: 1935; 91 years ago
- Arena: Menora Mivtachim Arena
- Capacity: 10,383
- Location: Tel Aviv, Israel
- Team colors: Red, White
- CEO: Arye Mendel
- President: Rami Cohen (resigned)
- General manager: Georgios Chinas
- Head coach: Dimitrios Itoudis
- Team captain: Bar Timor
- Ownership: Ofer Yannay (81%); Fan association (19%)
- Championships: 1 EuroCup; 5 Israeli Championships; 4 Israeli State Cups
- Retired numbers: 1 (15)
- Website: hapoelbc.com
Home	Away

Hapoel Tel Aviv Basketball Club (Hebrew: מועדון כדורסל הפועל תל אביב) is an Israeli professional basketball club based in Tel Aviv, Israel. Historically, it is the second-most successful team in Israeli basketball, with five national championships. The club is owned by businessman Ofer Yannay and the Hapoel Tel Aviv Supporters Trust. The team was established in 1935, and it plays in the Israeli Premier League and in the EuroLeague.

== History ==
Hapoel Tel Aviv was founded in 1935, as part of the Tel Aviv branch of the "Hapoel" sports cooperative, the sports department of the Histadrut labor union, which was socialist. The 15 years following the foundation of the Israeli national league in 1954 were the golden age in the club's history. During that time, it won most of its trophies.

In 1980, the club inaugurated its home venue of Hapoel Arena at Ussishkin Street (named for Menachem Ussishkin, a famous Zionist leader, which became the name of the new arena) in the northern part of Tel Aviv. This was in place of the open court that Hapoel had used for home games since 1953. The uncomfortable conditions, along with the fact that Hapoel Tel Aviv's fans were considered among the most fanatic in Israeli sports, contributed to Ussishkin being known for an extremely hostile atmosphere for visiting teams.

In 1995, the Histadrut decided to suspend financial support of all its Hapoel sports teams. The club was sold to a group of private businessmen, and from 1998 until 2009 (with a short pause for the 2003–04 season), it was owned by Shaul Eizenberg, an Israeli businessman and former press officer of the Israel Football Association. Except for three years of financial support by Russian multi-millionaire Vladimir Gusinsky, Hapoel Tel Aviv consistently suffered from financial difficulties. The result of this was an immediate deterioration in the club's stability, which led to relegation to the second league in 1996–97, 1998–99, and 2005–06.

=== 2005–06 season ===
In a controversial decision, Hapoel Tel Aviv decided to hold its home matches at Yad Eliyahu Arena. With its 10,383-seat capacity, it had been recognized for years to be the home of rivals Maccabi Tel Aviv. The decision followed a statement by club owner Shaul Eizenberg that Hapoel Tel Aviv must move to a larger arena in order to repeat its past glory days. Contributing to this decision was a change in policy of local police and municipal authorities. They declared the Ussishkin Arena to be unsafe, and announced plans to demolish it and build a boardwalk in place of the arena. Despite a campaign by fans to preserve the arena, it was demolished in 2007.

In 2006, Eizenberg decided to stop funding the team, and thus Hapoel Tel Aviv started the season in the second division. The situation wasn't improved in the following season; the team, built almost entirely of young players, was relegated to the third division, winning only two games all season. Although the team managed to stay in the Israeli first league, it played the 2006–07 season in the second league due to lack of funds. These issues, in addition to suffering managerial disorders, caused Hapoel Tel Aviv to finish last in the second league and it was relegated to the third division at the end of that season.

=== Hapoel Ussishkin period (2007–10) ===
Hapoel Ussishkin logo

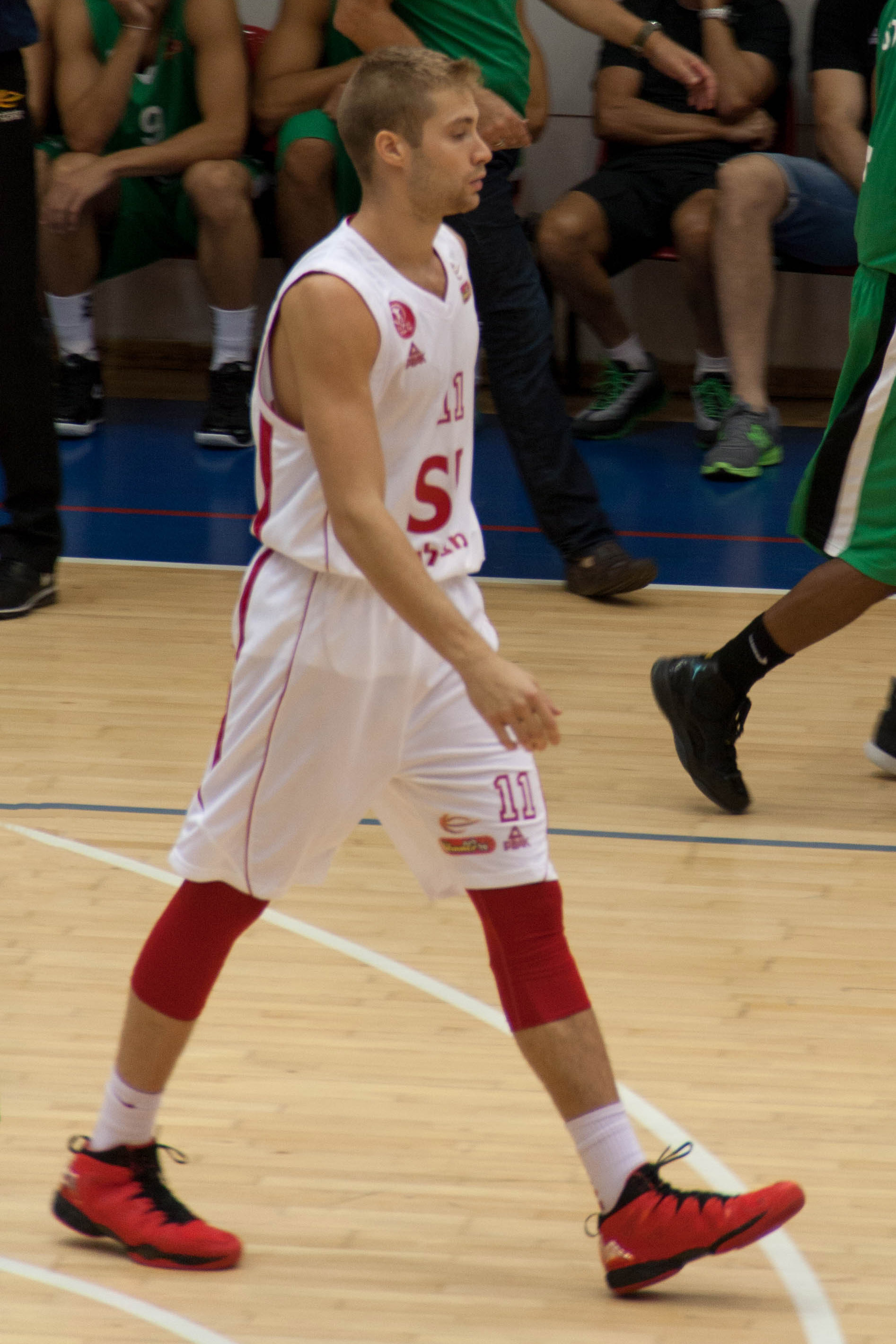
Willy Workman

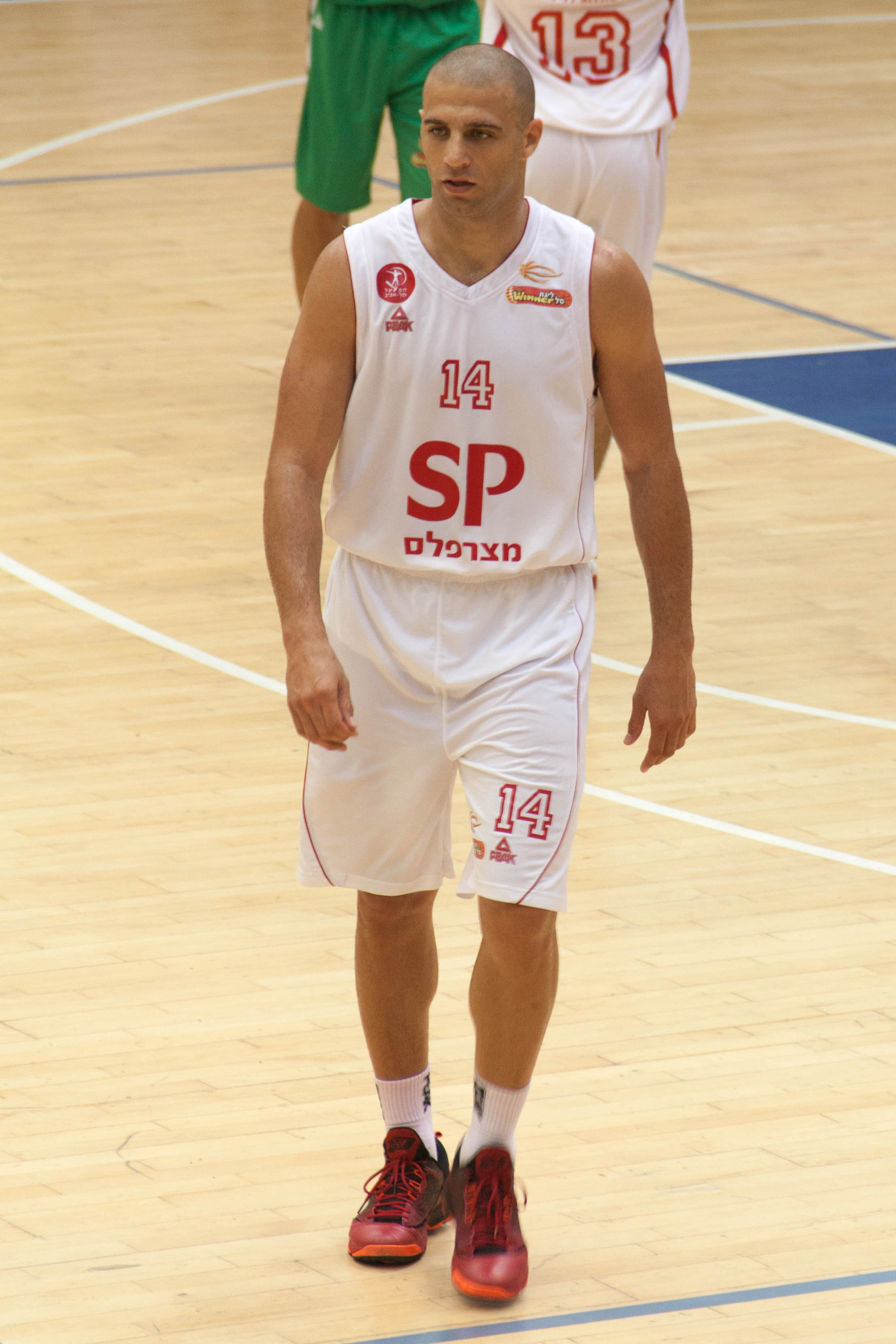
Raviv Limonad

In summer 2007, after suffering bankruptcy and relegation to the fourth district, the new team, Hapoel Ussishkin, was founded and registered in the Israeli Liga Bet Dan District (fifth tier) by Maor Harel. Hapoel Tel Aviv was owned and run by a supporters' trust with 1,800 registered paying members (as of May 2011). At that time, the admission fee to the trust was 300 NIS (equivalent to $90 USD). Besides voting rights in the trust's general assemblies, it also provides discount prices for club services such as a season ticket.

The team holds elections for the club's board every two years. In the second election in its history on June 11, 549 voters decided to keep four of the current board members in place for another term.

In December 2009, the original men's senior team announced its disbandment. Immediately, the supporters' trust bought the rights to the Hapoel Tel Aviv B.C. brand through a third party. The name change was approved by the trust in the following months, with the team's promotion for the 2010–11 national league season.

During the 2007–08 season, backed with an astronomical budget in fifth-tier terms of over 300,000 NIS (equivalent to $100,000 USD), the team finished its first season with a perfect record of 22–0 and qualified to the fourth division. The club also won another title by taking the Israeli Fifth Division Union Cup, continuing their undefeated streak. During the 2008–09 season, they finished with a perfect record, 22–0, and the team qualified for the third division. On April 30, 2009, the team won the Israeli fourth and third Division Union Cup, defeating the Hapoel Kfar Saba in the final game. Before the 2009–10 season started, it was decided that Hapoel Ussishkin would not play in the same district as Hapoel Tel Aviv, which played in the third division as well, thus avoiding an intriguing match-up. The team qualified to Liga Leumit (second division) with a perfect record and won the Israeli 4th and 3rd Division Union Cup, winning over the Elitzur Kohav-Yair/Keffar-Sabba in the final game.

==== Hapoel Ussishkin Honors ====
Liga Artzit (3rd)

- Winners: 2010 (North Division)

Liga Alef (4th)

- Winners: 2009 (Merkaz Division)

Liga Bet (5th)

- Winners: 2008 (Tel-Aviv Division)

Association Cup

- Champions (2): 2009, 2010

Liga Bet Association Cup

- Champions (1): 2008

==== Players of the Year ====
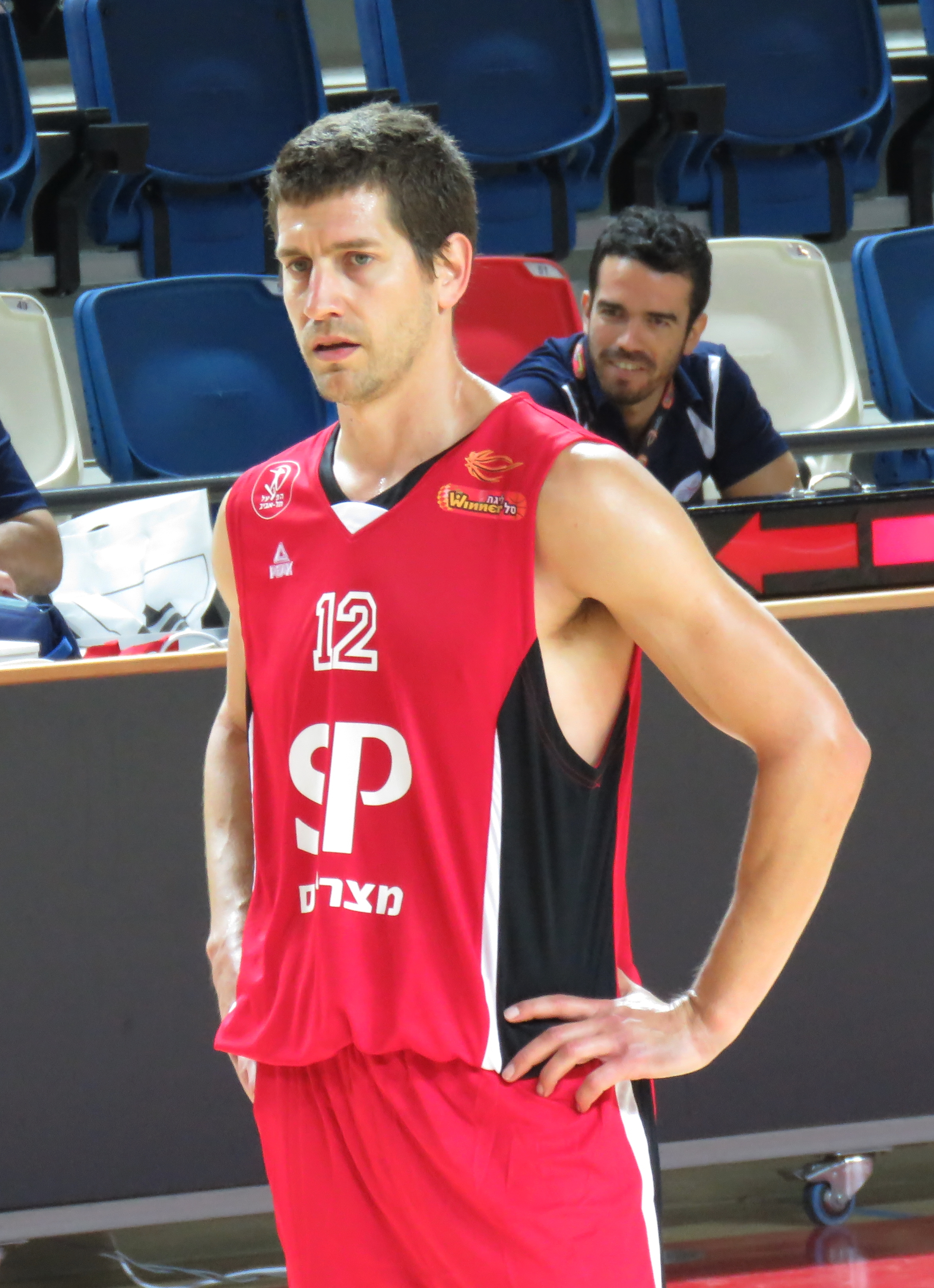
Matan Naor

The Player of the Year award is voted for by fans in time for the final home game of the season. Previous winners have been:

Year	Winner
2007–08	(Israel) Tohar Haimovic
2008–09	(Israel) Tohar Haimovic
2009–10	(Israel) Matan Naor

=== Hapoel Tel Aviv (2011–present) ===
At the end of 2009–10 season, following the closing of the original Hapoel Tel Aviv club, the rights to the club name were purchased by an anonymous businessman, and given to the Hapoel Ussishkin Management. The Management of Hapoel Ussishkin, following a member-wide voting process, decided to rename the club name back to Hapoel Tel Aviv. In the 2010–11 season, the club reached the semi-finals of the State Cup, before being knocked out by Elitzur Netanya. The club failed to achieve promotion to the first division at the end of the 2010–11 season, following a loss in the playoffs finals to B.C. Habik'a.

In the 2011–12 season, Hapoel Tel Aviv finally achieved promotion to the First Division, following a playoff win over Maccabi Be'er Ya'akov, therefore returning to the top tier after six years, and being the first fan-owned club in Israel to participate in a top-tier league.

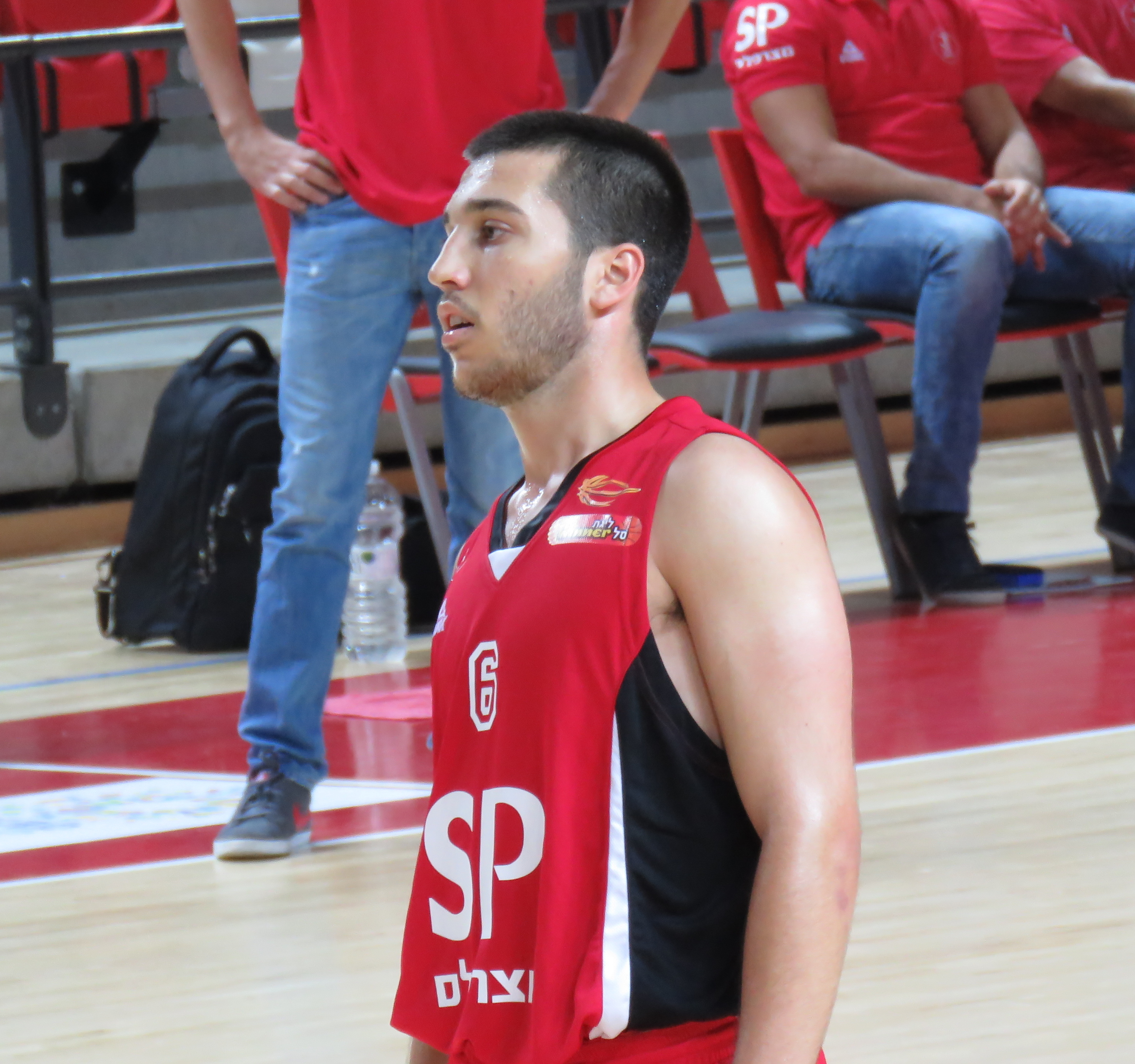
Tamir Blatt

From 2014 to 2017, Tamir Blatt played for the team. In March 2016, NBA star Nate Robinson signed with Hapoel Tel Aviv for the remainder of the season. Robinson led the team to the 8 seed and helped them to qualify for the playoffs. On May 19, Robinson scored 46 points in a quarter-final game against Hapoel Jerusalem, the most points scored in a playoff game since 1985.

In the 2024–25 season, Hapoel doubled its budget to 70-80 million NIS (equivalent to €16.8 million- €19.2 million). It acquired a range of high-profile players, including NBA veterans Patrick Beverley, Bruno Caboclo and Johnathan Motley. The team's management expressed their goal to win the EuroCup that season. Beverley left the team in February 2025. In April, the team had won the EuroCup and earned a promotion to the EuroLeague for the following 2025–26 season.

Towards the 2025–26 season, the team signed several more high-profile players, such as Vasilije Micić, Daniel Oturu and Elijah Bryant. In addition, Hapoel Tel Aviv retained Antonio Blakeney and Ish Wainright, who were significant factors in their promotion to the EuroLeague.

== Rivalries ==
=== Rivalry with Maccabi Tel Aviv ===
For years Hapoel and Maccabi Tel Aviv were considered the top two clubs of Israeli basketball. The Local derby matches between the two teams were always considered to be the most prestigious games in Israeli sports, and ones which led to a bitter atmosphere between fans of both clubs, often resulting in acts of mutual violence and hooliganism.

The tension between both clubs reached its peak in the 1980s. During this era they met for several times in the league's play-off finals and state cup finals. Probably the most famous meeting came in the best-of-three League Championship Finals in April 1985. Hapoel Tel Aviv won the first game in convincing fashion, leading by as much as 25 points late in the second half. Mike Largey always played well against Maccabi Tel Aviv, having beaten them five times in the four years that he played for Hapoel Tel Aviv. Prior to his arrival, Hapoel Tel Aviv had not beaten Maccabi Tel Aviv in 17 straight games. The Hapoel Tel Aviv fans were very confident that this was their year to win the League Championship. The second game started with Largey picking up where he left off from the first game. Then, towards the beginning of the second half, after play had stopped for a loose ball foul, Maccabi Tel Aviv's Motti Aroesti shoved his hand into the face of Largey. Largey responded immediately and threw Aroesti to the ground. Afterward, both players were ejected from the game and were automatically suspended from playing in Game 3. Largey was far more valuable to Hapoel Tel Aviv then Aroesti was to Maccabi Tel Aviv and, not surprisingly, Maccabi Tel Aviv went on to win Games 2 and 3. To this day, most Hapoel Tel Aviv fans are convinced that Maccabi Tel Aviv planned this provocation as a way to deal with its nemesis. These matches are still regarded as of the most exciting in Israeli basketball history.

During the years as Maccabi Tel Aviv strengthened its dominance in Israeli basketball and its status as the almost-eternal champions, "Hapoel" fans accused their rival's management of various wrongful doing.

== Players ==
=== Current roster ===
Hapoel Tel Aviv roster
Players
Coaches

Pos.	No.	Nat.	Name	Ht.	Wt.	Age
F	0	(United States)	Toppin, Jacob	2.06 m (6 ft 9 in)	91 kg (201 lb)	26 – 8 May 2000
PG	1	(United States)	German, Eugene	1.83 m (6 ft 0 in)	84 kg (185 lb)	28 – 2 December 1997
SG	2	(United States)	Blakeney, Antonio	1.93 m (6 ft 4 in)	87 kg (192 lb)	30 – 4 October 1996
G/F	3	(United States)	Bryant, Elijah	1.96 m (6 ft 5 in)	95 kg (209 lb)	31 – 19 April 1995
G	5	(Israel)	Carrington, Khadeen	1.93 m (6 ft 4 in)	88 kg (194 lb)	31 – 3 October 1995
F/C	6	(Israel)	Segev, Itay	2.05 m (6 ft 9 in)	104 kg (229 lb)	31 – 15 June 1995
G/F	7	(United States)	Coffey, Amir	2.01 m (6 ft 7 in)	95 kg (209 lb)	29 – 17 June 1997
G	9	(Israel)	Palatin, Guy	1.92 m (6 ft 4 in)	88 kg (194 lb)	26 – 25 September 2000
G/F	10	(Israel)	Timor, Bar (C)	1.90 m (6 ft 3 in)	84 kg (185 lb)	34 – 2 March 1992
PG	11	(Canada)	Ennis, Tyler (injured)	1.91 m (6 ft 3 in)	88 kg (194 lb)	32 – 24 August 1994
F	12	(Uganda)	Wainright, Ish	1.96 m (6 ft 5 in)	113 kg (249 lb)	32 – 12 September 1994
PG	13	(Czech Republic)	Satoranský, Tomáš	2.01 m (6 ft 7 in)	95 kg (209 lb)	35 – 30 October 1991
F	14	(Israel)	Blayzer, Oz	2.00 m (6 ft 7 in)	101 kg (223 lb)	33 – 29 December 1992
F/C	16	(Azerbaijan)	LeDay, Zach	2.03 m (6 ft 8 in)	107 kg (236 lb)	32 – 30 May 1994
G/F	18	(France)	Bourdillon, Frédéric	1.93 m (6 ft 4 in)	86 kg (190 lb)	35 – 16 March 1991
C	21	(Puerto Rico)	Odiase, Tai	2.06 m (6 ft 9 in)	109 kg (240 lb)	31 – 21 September 1995
PG	22	(Serbia)	Micić, Vasilije	1.99 m (6 ft 6 in)	85 kg (187 lb)	32 – 13 January 1994
C	25	(Nigeria) (United States)	Oturu, Daniel	2.07 m (6 ft 9 in)	109 kg (240 lb)	27 – 20 September 1999
SG	33	(Israel)	Heidegger, Max	1.91 m (6 ft 3 in)	82 kg (181 lb)	29 – 5 June 1997
PF	41	(Israel)	Ginat, Tomer	2.02 m (6 ft 8 in)	98 kg (216 lb)	32 – 7 November 1994
PG	45	(Israel)	Blatt, Tamir	1.83 m (6 ft 0 in)	82 kg (181 lb)	29 – 4 May 1997
F/C	51	(Brazil)	Caboclo, Bruno (injured)	2.08 m (6 ft 10 in)	104 kg (229 lb)	30 – 4 May 1996

Head coach

- (Greece) Dimitris Itoudis

Assistant coach(es)

- (Greece) Stefanos Dedas
- (Israel) Barak Lederer
- (Israel) Gil Salter

Legend

- (C) Team captain
- Injured

- Roster
Updated: November 4, 2026

=== EuroLeague Depth chart ===
Pos.	Starting 5	Bench 1	Bench 2	Bench 3	Inactive
C	Tai Odiase	Daniel Oturu	Zach LeDay	Itay Segev	Bruno Caboclo (injured)
PF	Ish Wainright	Tomer Ginat		Oz Blayzer
SF	Amir Coffey	Jacob Toppin		Frédéric Bourdillon
SG	Elijah Bryant	Antonio Blakeney		Khadeen Carrington
PG	Vasilije Micić	Eugene German	Tomáš Satoranský	Tamir Blatt	Tyler Ennis (injured)

=== Ligat HaAl Depth chart ===
Pos.	Starting 5	Bench 1	Bench 2	Reserve
C	Daniel Oturu	Itay Segev
PF	Tomer Ginat	Oz Blayzer	Ish Wainright
SF	Amir Coffey	Guy Palatin
SG	Khadeen Carrington	Antonio Blakeney		Frédéric Bourdillon
PG	Eugene German	Bar Timor	Max Heidegger	Tamir Blatt

(colors: Domestic players; foreign players; young players)

- The Israeli league rule requires every team to have at least one Israeli on the court at any time.
- There should be at least 7 Israelis and up to 5 foreigners on a 12-men game sheet.

=== Notable players ===
Note: Flags indicate national team eligibility at FIBA-sanctioned events. Players may hold other non-FIBA nationalities not displayed.

Criteria

To appear in this section a player must have either:

- Set a club record or won an individual award while at the club
- Played at least one official international match for their national team at any time
- Played at least one official NBA match at any time.

- (Israel) Haim Hazan 13 seasons: '53–'66
- (Israel) Zvi Lubezki 15 seasons: '56–'71
- (Israel) Rami Gutt 13 seasons: '59–'72
- (Israel) Gershon Dekel 14 seasons: '61–'75
- (United States) Bill Wold 3 seasons: '66–'68
- (United States) (Israel) Mark Torenshine 9 seasons: '68–'77
- (United States) (Israel) Barry Leibowitz 11 seasons: '68–'69, '71–'82
- (United States) (Israel) Ivan Leshinsky 4 seasons: '68–'71
- (United States) Patrick Beverley 1 season: '24–'25
- (United States) Dave Newmark 2 seasons: '73–'74, '77–'78
- (Israel) Danny Bracha 11 seasons: '73–'84
- (Israel) Pinchas Hozez 11 seasons: '74–'85
- (United States) (Israel) John Willis 8 seasons: '76–'82, '84–'85, '86–'87
- (Israel) Boaz Yanai 1 season: '79–'80
- (United States) (Israel) LaVon Mercer 8 seasons: '80–'88
- (United States) (Israel) Kenny Labanowski 4 seasons: '81–'85
- (Israel) Amos Frishman 11 seasons: '81–'89, '90–'93
- (United States) Mike Largey 4 seasons: '83–'87
- (Israel) Ofer Fleischer 6 seasons: '84–'87, '93–'95, '98–'99
- (Israel) Shimon Amsalem 10 seasons: '85–'94, '98–'99
- (United States) (Israel) Jon Dalzell 2 seasons: '87–'88, '91–'92
- (Israel) Haim Zlotikman 2 seasons: '87–'88, '92–'93
- (United States) Linton Townes 2 seasons: '87–'89
- (United States) (Israel) Howard Lassoff 3 seasons: '87–'90
- (United States) Dennis Williams 2 seasons: '88–'90
- (United States) (Israel) Keith Bennett 3 seasons: '88–'91
- (United States) (Israel) James Terry 4 seasons: '88–'89, '90–'91, '94–'96
- (United States) Derrick Hamilton 1 season: '89
- (United States) Mike Gibson 1 season: '90
- (United States) David Henderson 1 season: '90–'91
- (United States) Doug Lee 1 season: '91–'92
- (United States) Purvis Short 1 season: '91–'92
- (United States) David Thirdkill 3 seasons: '91–'94
- (Israel) Tomer Steinhauer 3 seasons: '91–'94
- (United States) Terry Fair 1 season: '92–'93
- (Bosnia and Herzegovina) Radenko Dobraš 3 seasons: '92–'93, '95, '00–'01
- (Israel) Lior Arditi 2 seasons: '93–'95
- (Israel) Meir Tapiro 2 seasons: '94–'96
- (United States) Buck Johnson 1 season: '94–'95
- (United States) Milt Wagner 1 season: '94–'95
- (Bosnia and Herzegovina) Nenad Marković 1 season: '95–'96
- (Israel) Gil Mossinson 6 seasons: '95–'98, '02–'03, '04–'06
- (United States) Kevin Bradshaw 3 seasons: '96–'99
- (Israel) Dror Hagag 3 seasons: '01–'04
- (United States) Cedric Ceballos 1 season: '02
- (United States) Chris King 1 season: '02–'03
- (United States) Billy Keys 1 season: '02–'03
- (Montenegro) Nikola Bulatović 1 season: '02–'03
- (Israel) Yaniv Green 2 seasons: '02–'04
- (Israel) Matan Naor 12 seasons: '02–'04, '07–'17
- (Lithuania) Virginijus Praškevičius 1 season: '03–'04
- (Bosnia and Herzegovina) (Slovenia) Jasmin Hukić 1 season: '03–'04
- (United States) (Turkey) Michael Wright 1 season: '03–'04
- (United States) William Avery 1 season: '04
- (Slovenia) Samo Udrih 1 season: '04–'05
- (United States) Kenny Williams 1 season: '04–'05
- (United States) Marcus Hatten 1 season: '05–'06
- (United States) (Israel) Jeron Roberts 1 season: '05–'06
- (Israel) Bar Timor 4 seasons: '11–'13, '20–present
- (United States) Curtis Kelly 3 seasons: '11–'13, '15
- (Sweden) (Israel) Jonathan Skjöldebrand 4 seasons: '11–'15
- (United States) Jeff Allen 3 seasons: '12–'13, '15–'16, '17
- (United States) Brian Randle 1 season: '13
- (United States) Carlon Brown 1 season: '13–'14
- (Israel) Raviv Limonad 6 seasons: '13–'19
- (United States) Yancy Gates 1 season: '14–'15
- (Jamaica) (United States) Durand Scott 1 season: '14–'15
- (Israel) Tamir Blatt 4 seasons: '14–'17, '26–present
- (United States) Tre Simmons 1 season: '15–'16
- (United States) Nate Robinson 1 season: '16
- (United States) Mark Lyons 2 seasons: '16–'17, '19–'20
- (United States) Alando Tucker 1 season: '16–'17
- (United States) (Israel) Adrian Banks 2 seasons: '16–'18
- (United States) (Israel) Richard Howell 2 seasons: '16–'17, '18–'19
- (Israel) Tomer Ginat 4 seasons: '16–present
- (United States) Tony Gaffney 1 season: '17–'18
- (United States) Jerel McNeal 2 seasons: '17–'19
- (United States) Jamal Shuler 1 season: '18–'19
- (Israel) David Kaminsky
- (Israel) Shamuel Nachmias
- (Israel) Ari Rosenberg
- (Israel) Ami Shelef
- (Israel) Ofer Yaakobi

== Season by season ==
Season	Tier	Division	Pos.	State Cup	Other cups		European competitions		
2001–02	2	National League	1st	Quarterfinalist					
2002–03	1	Premier League	7th	Semifinalist			4 Champions Cup	QF	11–7
2003–04	1	Premier League	2nd	Semifinalist			3 Europe League	3rd	14–5
2004–05	1	Premier League	2nd	Quarterfinalist			3 Europe League	EF	8–8
2005–06	1	Premier League	5th	Quarterfinalist			3 EuroCup	RS	2–4
2006–07	2	National League	14th	Eightfinalist					
2007–08	5	Liga Bet	1st		Liga Bet Association Cup	C			
2008–09	4	Liga Alef	1st		Association Cup	C			
2009–10	3	Liga Artzit	1st		Association Cup	C			
2010–11	2	National League	2nd	Semifinalist					
2011–12	2	National League	1st	Quarterfinalist			R Balkan League	SF	8–3
2012–13	1	Premier League	8th	Eightfinalist					
2013–14	1	Premier League	5th	Semifinalist	League Cup	QF			
2014–15	1	Premier League	7th	Quarterfinalist	League Cup	SF			
2015–16	1	Premier League	8th	Eightfinalist	League Cup	SF			
2016–17	1	Premier League	10th	Eightfinalist	League Cup	QF			
2017–18	1	Premier League	5th	Quarterfinalist	League Cup	QF			
2018–19	1	Premier League	8th	Quarterfinalist			3 Champions League	QR1	1–1
2019–20	1	Premier League	8th	Eightfinalist	League Cup	QF			
2020–21	1	Premier League	10th	Quarterfinalist	Balkan League	2RPO	3 Champions League	QR1	0–1
2021–22	1	Premier League	7th	Finalist	League Cup	QF			
2022–23	1	Premier League	2nd	Quarterfinalist	League Cup	2nd	2 EuroCup	QF	14–6
2023–24	1	Premier League	2nd	Quarterfinalist	League Cup	SF	2 EuroCup	QF	13–6
2024–25	1	Premier League	3rd	Semifinalist	League Cup	QF	2 EuroCup	C	17–7

== Managerial history ==
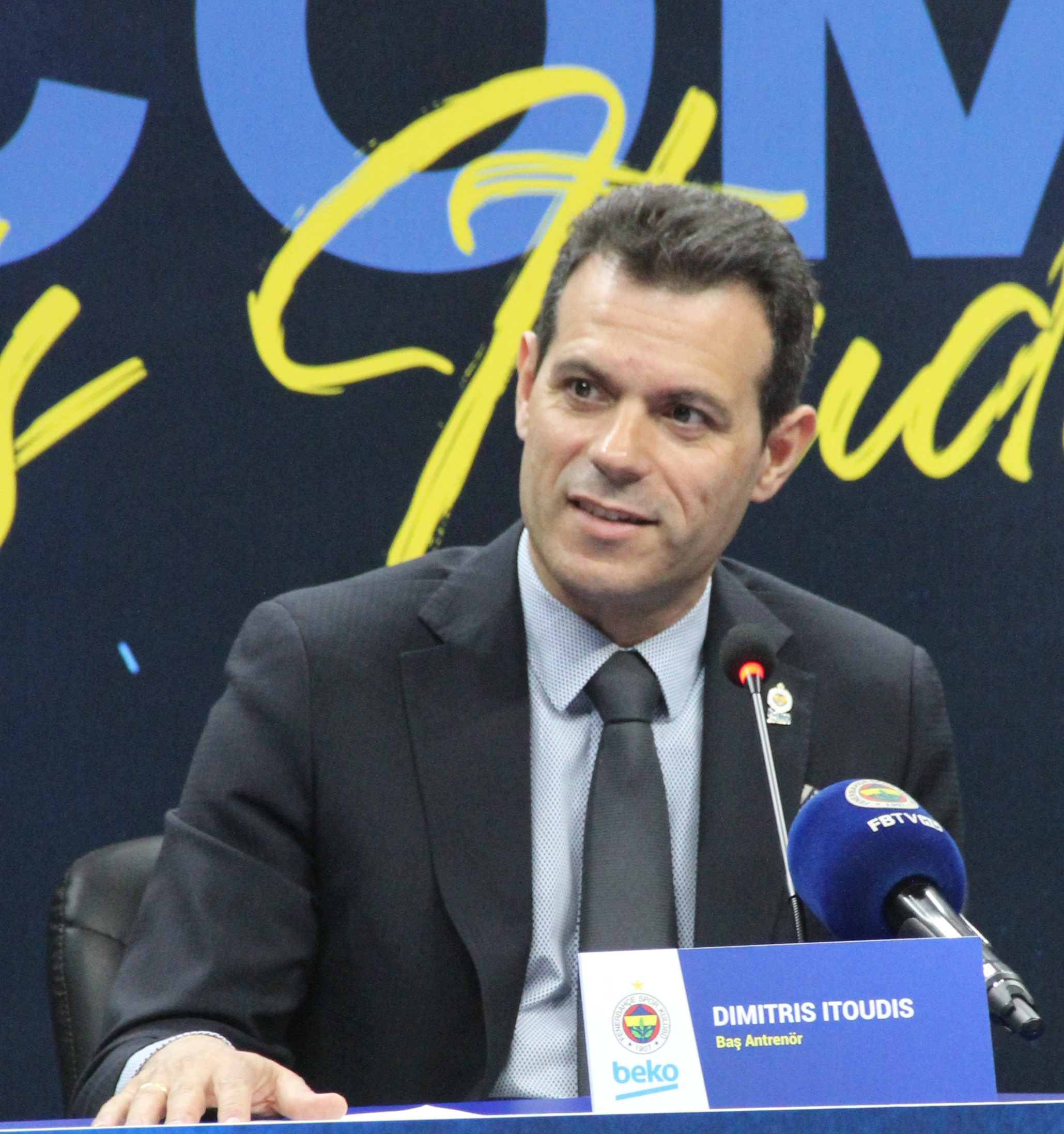
Dimitrios Itoudis

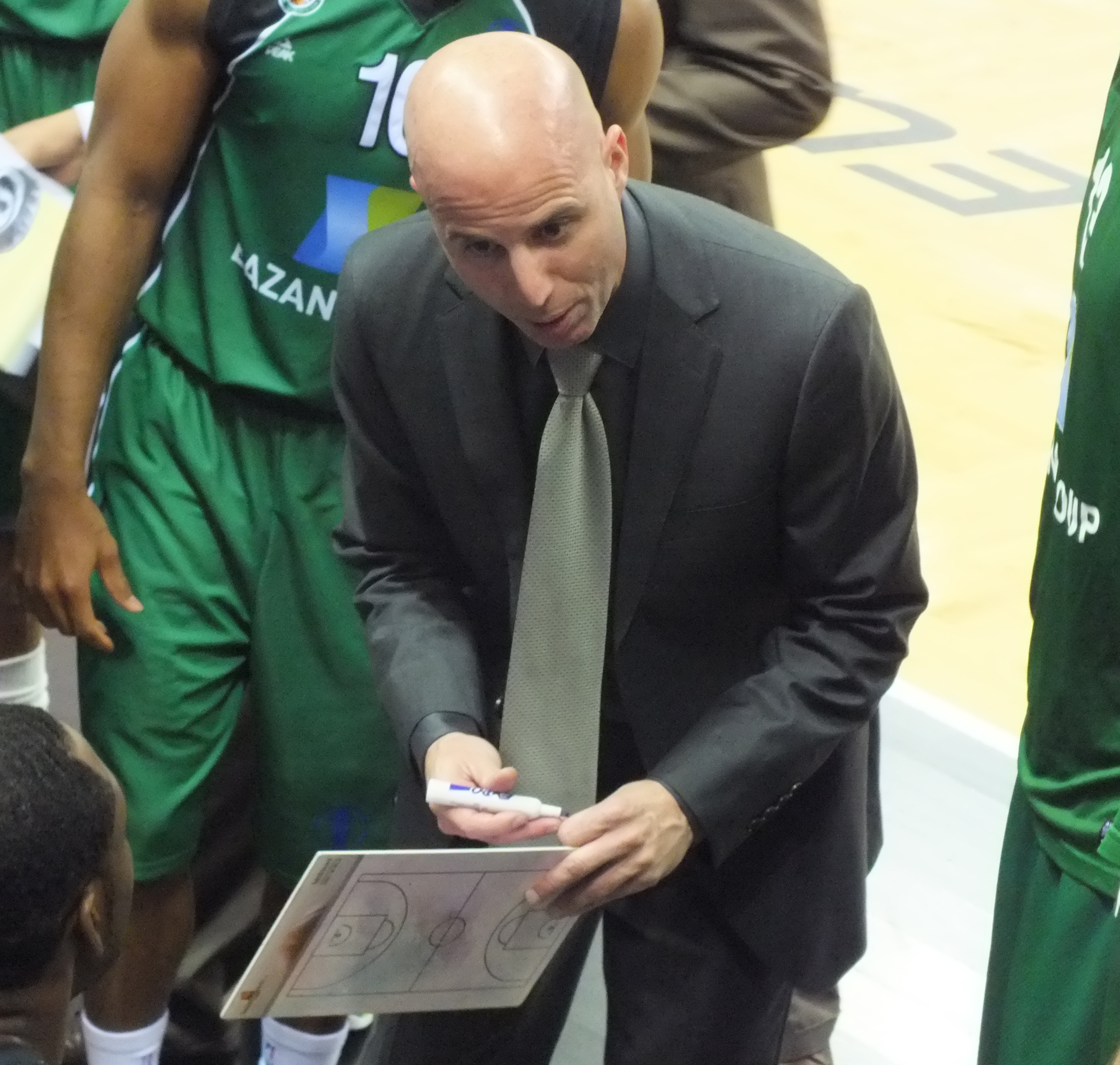
Danny Franco

- Ami Shelef (1936–1988)

Dates	Manager
2007–2009	(Israel) Uri Shelef
2009–2011	(Israel) Sharon Avrahami
2011–2014	(Israel) Erez Edelstein
2014–2015	(Israel) Oded Kattash
2015–2017	(Israel) Sharon Avrahami
2017	(Israel) Rami Hadar
2017	(Israel) Roy Hagai
2017–2019	(Israel) Danny Franco
2019–2020	(Israel) Ariel Beit-Halahmy
2020–2021	(Greece) Ioannis Kastritis
2021–2024	(Israel) Danny Franco
2024	(Greece) Stefanos Dedas
2024–	(Greece) Dimitrios Itoudis

== Staff ==
Position	Name
Chairman	Rami Cohen
CEO	Arye Mendel
Board Member	Abraham Zaidenberg
Team Manager	Etay Berger
Spokesperson	Etay Berger

== Honours and other achievements ==
Honours
Type	Competition	Titles	Seasons
International	EuroCup	1	2024–25
Domestic	Israeli League	5	1959–60, 1960–61, 1964–65, 1965–66, 1968–69
Domestic	Israeli State Cup	4	1961–62, 1968–69, 1983–84, 1992–93

=== Other achievements ===
==== International competitions ====
- FIBA Korać Cup
  - Semifinalist (2): 1979–80, 1987–88
- FIBA EuroChallenge
  - Semifinalist (1): 2003–04

==== Domestic competitions ====
- Israeli League
  - Runners-up (22): 1956–57, 1957–58, 1958–59, 1962–63, 1963–64, 1966–67, 1967–68, 1969–70, 1970–71, 1978–79, 1979–80, 1984–85, 1986–87, 1987–88, 1988–89, 1991–92, 1992–93, 1993–94, 2003–04, 2004–05, 2022–23, 2023–24
- Israeli State Cup
  - Runners-up (13): 1955–56, 1957–58, 1962–63, 1963–64, 1964–65, 1965–66, 1969–70, 1975–76, 1976–77, 1977–78, 1982–83, 1993–94, 2022
- Israeli League Cup
  - Runners-up (2): 2022, 2025

==== Lower divisions competitions ====
Israeli National League (2nd)

- Champions: 1998, 2002, 2012

==== Regional competitions ====
- Balkan League
  - Semifinalist (1): 2012

== Former managers ==
- Yehoshua Rozin
- Ralph Klein
- Zvika Sherf
- Erez Edelstein
- Haim Hazan
- Moshe Weinkrantz
- Danny Franco

== See also ==
- List of fan-owned sports teams
