= Rami Hadar =

Israeli basketball coach

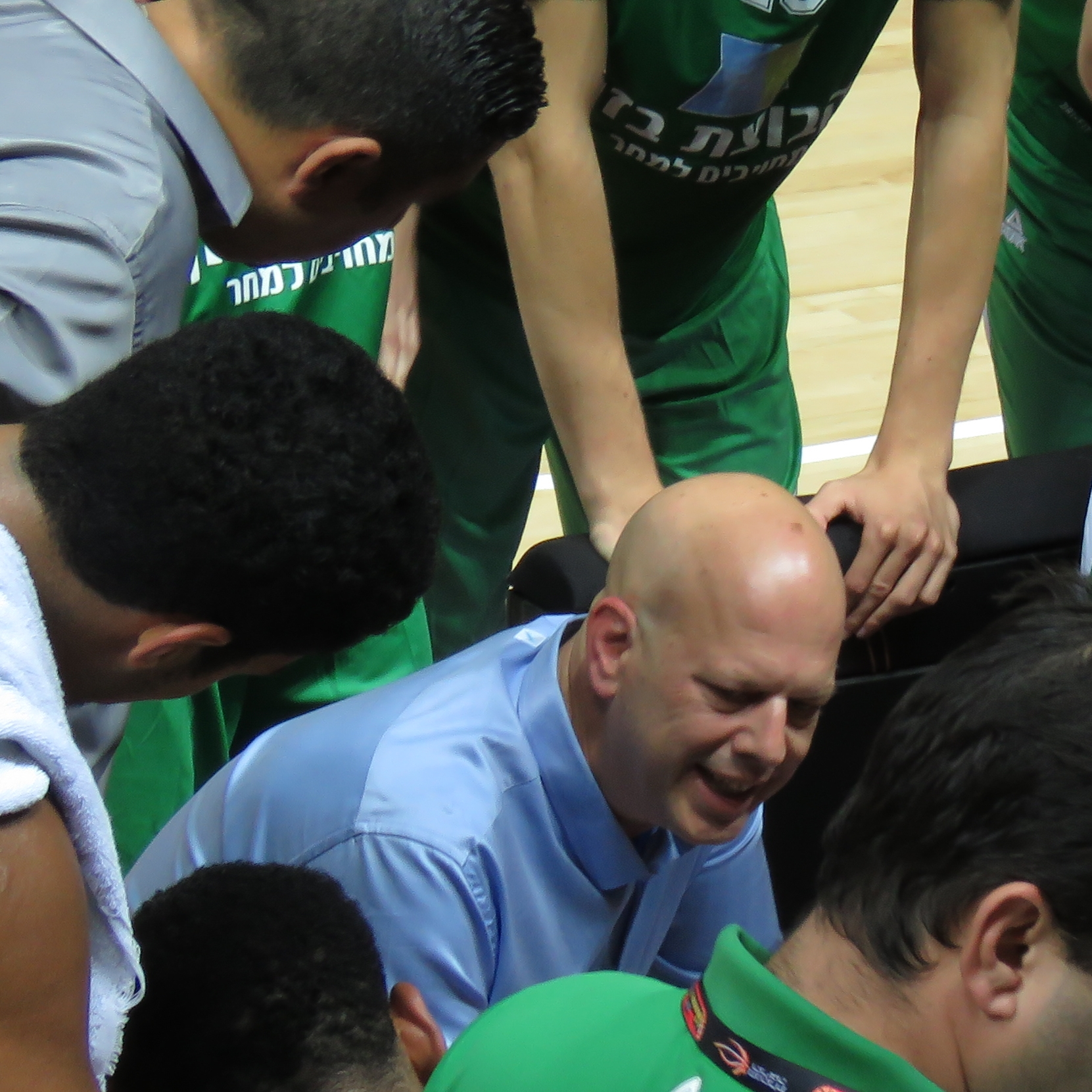
- Rami Hadar during a timeout, 2015

Golden Eagle Ylli
- Position: Head coach
- League: Kosovo Basketball Superleague

Personal information
- Born: 1 November 1966 (age 60) Kiryat Tiv'on, Israel
- Listed height: 6 ft 4 in (1.93 m)
- Coaching career: 1993–present

Career history

Coaching
- 1993–1994: Hapoel Holon (assistant)
- 1994: Hapoel Holon
- 1994–1995: Hapoel Migdal HaEmeq
- 2000–2003: Beitar Binyamina
- 2004–2005: Hapoel Givatayim
- 2008–2010: Maccabi Ashdod
- 2010–2011: Maccabi Be'er Ya'akov
- 2011–2012: Maccabi Hod HaSharon
- 2012: Maccabi Haifa
- 2012–2013: Maccabi Haifa (assistant)
- 2013–2014: Hapoel Afula
- 2014–2016: Maccabi Haifa
- 2016: Maccabi Tel Aviv (assistant)
- 2016: Maccabi Tel Aviv
- 2017: Hapoel Tel Aviv
- 2017–2018: SCM U Craiova
- 2018–2022: Hapoel Be'er Sheva
- 2023–2024: Peja
- 2023–2024: Kosovo
- 2024–2026: Hapoel Be'er Sheva
- 2026–present: Golden Eagle Ylli

Career highlights
- As head coach: Kosovo Superleague (2023); As assistant coach: Israeli League champion (2013)

Rami Hadar (Hebrew: רמי הדר; born 1 November 1966) is an Israeli professional basketball coach, currently serving as the head coach for Golden Eagle Ylli of the Kosovo Basketball Superleague.

== Early life ==
Hadar was born and grew up in Kiryat Tiv'on located at the northern district of Israel and started playing basketball as point guard at the local club in his town, Hapoel Kiryat Tiv'on. When he turned 18, Hadar decided to retire from basketball and join the IDF Navy Branch. Five years later, Hadar resumed his basketball career and played in the Israeli Basketball lower leagues for few years as he was studying to complete his course work to gain a basketball coaching diploma.

== Coaching career ==
Hadar's coaching career began in 1992, when he got his first job as an assistant for Hanoch Mintz in Hapoel Givatayim. Two years later, in 1994, he joined Hapoel Holon as an assistant, but has replaced head coach Ilan Kovalski upon his resignation and coached the remaining six games along with Mike Carter, who served as player/coach. In the next season, Hadar coached second-tier league Hapoel Migdal HaEmeq, and after failing there took a break from basketball for several years and started an architecture related business. He described the time out of basketball as years that helped him to "understand life better and to develop his personality".

After 5 years, Hadar returned to basketball and once again started coaching teams in the lower leagues of the Israeli basketball. On 3 January 2011, while coaching Maccabi Be'er Ya'akov, his key player Itay Levi tragically collapsed and died of heart failure during a team's training session. Hadar found this incident hard to digest and decided to resign at the end of the season after he led Be'er Ya'akov to the second-tier league playoffs.

In 2011/12 season, Hadar joined Maccabi Hod HaSharon from Liga Leumit as head coach. In the same year, Maccabi Hod Hasharon became a farm system affiliate for Maccabi Haifa. In January 2012, Maccabi Haifa owner Jeff Rosen fired Miki Gorka and appointed Hadar as head coach for the rest of the season. Hadar coached Maccabi Haifa in the 11 remaining games of the season; he earned 2 wins and 9 losses. Even though his first year record in Ligat Ha'Al was substandard, Hadar continued in Maccabi Haifa, but moved to the assistant manager role under head coach Brad Greenberg. In this season, 2012/13, Maccabi Haifa won their first-ever championship after a defeating a David Blatt's Maccabi Tel Aviv in the finals.

One season later, Hadar returned to Liga Leumit and signed a one-year contract with Hapoel Afula where he ended the season in the 2nd place in the league, and once again earned his place as the head coach of Maccabi Haifa which he led twice to the league quarter-finals playoffs and to the semi-finals of the Israeli cup the following two years.

In July 2016, Hadar was appointed as assistant manager for Maccabi Tel Aviv under head coach Erez Edelstein. Three months later, Hadar replaced Erez Edelstein as the head coach on 22 October 2016 after Edelstein was fired due to a poor start of the season. On 16 December 2016, after losing three straight EuroLeague games, Hadar resigned. On 3 January 2017, Hadar was appointed as head coach for Hapoel Tel Aviv and became the first head coach to manage Maccabi and Hapoel Tel Aviv at the same season. On 29 April 2017, he parted ways with Hapoel Tel Aviv.

On 7 July 2017, Hadar was appointed as the head coach for SCM U Craiova of the Romanian League.

On May 31, 2018, Hapoel Be'er Sheva announced Hadar as their new head coach for the 2018–19 season.

On 22 May, 2023, the Basketball Federation of Kosovo presented Hadar as the new coach of the Kosovo national team.

On June 13th, 2026, Hadar was appointed as head coach for Golden Eagle Ylli
