= Ofer Yannay =

Israeli businessman and entrepreneur

- עופר ינאי
- Born: February 2, 1975 (age 51); Yavne, Israel
- Citizenship: Israel
- Education: Hebrew University of Jerusalem; Ben-Gurion University of the Negev
- Occupations: Businessman, entrepreneur
- Known for: Founder of Nofar Energy; Owner of Hapoel Tel Aviv B.C.
- Children: 1

Ofer Yannay (Hebrew: עופר ינאי; born 2 February 1975) is an Israeli businessman and entrepreneur. He is the founder, controlling shareholder and chief executive officer of renewable energy company Nofar Energy. Yannay is also a principal owner of Israeli basketball club Hapoel Tel Aviv B.C., which he acquired in 2023.

In 2023, The Jerusalem Post included Yannay in its annual list of the 50 most influential Jews, ranking him 40th. He appeared on the list again in 2026, when he was ranked 29th.

== Early life and education ==
Yannay was born in 1975 and grew up in Yavne, Israel, the second of eight children. His father, Mordechai, was born in Tunisia and immigrated to Israel with his family in the 1950s, while his mother, Toni, came from a family of immigrants from Libya. His parents worked in education; his father served as a religious high school principal and his mother was a preschool teacher.

Yannay attended a yeshiva high school in Nehalim and later studied at Yeshivat Har Etzion, where he participated in the Hesder program. He served in the Israel Defense Forces in the Armored Corps.

After his military service, Yannay studied in the Amirim interdisciplinary honors program at the Hebrew University of Jerusalem, earning a degree combining physics, mathematics and computer science. He later received a master's degree in business administration from Ben-Gurion University of the Negev.

== Business career ==
=== Early ventures ===
In 2001, Yannay founded Go4Eat, an online food-ordering business. The venture was unsuccessful, and Yannay subsequently returned to university to pursue an MBA. During his graduate studies, he became interested in the renewable energy industry.

=== Nofar Energy ===
Yannay founded Nofar Energy in 2011. The company initially focused on installing photovoltaic systems in Israel, particularly on rooftops in kibbutz communities. By 2015, it had installed more than 1,000 rooftop solar systems.

Under Yannay's leadership, Nofar expanded into energy storage and floating photovoltaic systems and subsequently entered international markets in Europe, the United States and Brazil. The company was listed on the Tel Aviv Stock Exchange in 2020.

In 2025, Yannay became chief executive officer of Nofar Energy following management changes at the company. In November 2025, Yannay and Leumi Partners established Ofer Yannay Group, through which they increased their holdings in Nofar. Following the transaction, the joint company held 26.3% of Nofar, while Yannay directly held an additional approximately 5% of the company.

In May 2026, Nofar's market capitalization exceeded NIS 10 billion following a rise in its share price and a series of acquisitions and investments under Yannay's management.

== Sports ownership ==
In 2023, Yannay acquired a controlling interest in Hapoel Tel Aviv B.C., becoming the club's first private owner. He subsequently increased investment in the team and its playing staff.

Under Yannay's ownership, Hapoel Tel Aviv won the EuroCup in 2025, the first European title in the club's history, and subsequently qualified for the EuroLeague.

Yannay has described his investment in the club partly as a business venture, arguing that structural changes in European basketball could increase the commercial value of leading clubs.

In 2026, the ownership structure of the company controlling Hapoel Tel Aviv was reorganized. Yannay retained a 40% stake in Yannay Sport, while investors Gili Raanan, Micky Malka and Alan Howard each held 20%. Yannay Sport continued to hold 81% of the company managing Hapoel Tel Aviv, with the Hapoel Ussishkin Association holding the remaining 19%.

Yannay has also been an owner of Hapoel Galil Elyon.

== Other investments ==
In 2024, Yannay acquired a 10% stake in Israeli television network Reshet 13, with an option to increase his holding.

== Philanthropy ==
Yannay chairs the Yannay Foundation, which supports initiatives in education, healthcare and foster care. He also serves on the advisory committee of the Or Ofir Foundation, an organization established in memory of Ofir Libstein, the former head of the Sha'ar HaNegev Regional Council.

== Recognition ==
In 2023, The Jerusalem Post ranked Yannay 40th on its list of the 50 most influential Jews, citing his activities in renewable energy, sports and philanthropy.

In 2026, the newspaper again included him on the list, ranking him 29th and highlighting the international expansion of Nofar Energy and Hapoel Tel Aviv's entry into the EuroLeague.

== Personal life ==
Yannay is the father of one daughter. As of 2025, he lived in Ra'anana.
