= Nofar Energy =

Israeli renewable energy company

- Native name: נופר אנרגיה
- Type: Public
- Traded as: TASE: NOFR
- Industry: Renewable energy
- Founded: April 2011; 15 years ago
- Founder: Ofer Yannay
- Headquarters: Kfar Saba, Israel
- Key people: Ofer Yannay (CEO)
- Products: Solar power, energy storage
- Number of employees: 200 (2026)
- Website: www.nofar-energy.com

O.Y. Nofar Energy Ltd., commonly known as Nofar Energy (Hebrew: ע.י. נופר אנרג'י בע"מ), is an Israeli renewable energy company headquartered in Kfar Saba. The company develops, finances, constructs, owns and operates renewable energy and energy storage projects, primarily involving solar photovoltaic generation and battery energy storage.

The company was founded by Israeli entrepreneur Ofer Yannay in 2011 and initially developed solar installations in Israel, particularly on rooftops in kibbutz communities. It subsequently expanded into utility-scale solar generation, floating photovoltaic systems and battery storage, and into markets in Europe and the United States.

Nofar became a publicly traded company following an initial public offering on the Tel Aviv Stock Exchange in December 2020.

== History ==
Nofar Energy floating solar reservoir

=== Establishment and early operations ===
Nofar Energy was incorporated as a private company in Israel in April 2011. It was founded by Ofer Yannay, who became its controlling shareholder and chairman.

The company's early activities focused on relatively small photovoltaic installations. A significant part of its early growth came from agreements with Israeli kibbutz communities, under which photovoltaic panels were installed on agricultural and industrial rooftops, including barns, warehouses and other buildings.

Beginning in 2012, Nofar developed a business model for partnerships with kibbutzim, eventually installing solar systems on buildings in approximately 130 kibbutzim. The company subsequently expanded from rooftop installations into larger renewable energy projects.

In 2015, Nofar entered the floating solar sector, installing photovoltaic systems on water reservoirs in Israel. The company later became one of the principal developers of floating photovoltaic projects in the Israeli market.

In 2020, Nofar established an energy storage facility in Israel as part of its expansion into battery energy storage.

=== Investment by Noy Fund and IPO ===
In August 2020, prior to Nofar's public offering, Israeli infrastructure investment fund Noy Fund invested approximately NIS 225–230 million in the company in exchange for a 25% stake, valuing Nofar at approximately NIS 1 billion.

The companies also established Noy-Nofar Europe, a joint venture intended to develop renewable energy projects in European markets.

In December 2020, Nofar completed its initial public offering on the Tel Aviv Stock Exchange. The company raised approximately NIS 600 million at a valuation of approximately NIS 2.6 billion. Its shares began trading under the ticker NOFR.

In October 2021, Nofar raised an additional NIS 550 million through a share offering to Israeli institutional investors, including Phoenix Holdings, Migdal, More Investment House and Altshuler Shaham.

=== International expansion ===
Following its IPO, Nofar accelerated its expansion outside Israel, investing in renewable energy projects in European markets including Spain, Italy, Romania and Poland.

In December 2022, Nofar acquired an additional 12.5% of Noy-Nofar Europe from Noy Fund for approximately NIS 215 million (€57.3 million), increasing Nofar's holding in the venture to 52.5% and giving it control of the company.

The company's international portfolio subsequently expanded to include projects in Spain, Romania, Italy, Poland, the United Kingdom and the United States.

== Operations ==
Nofar's activities include the development, financing, construction, ownership, operation and maintenance of renewable energy facilities. Its principal activities are solar power generation and electricity storage.

The company's solar portfolio includes ground-mounted photovoltaic plants, commercial and industrial rooftop systems and floating photovoltaic facilities installed on reservoirs. Nofar also develops utility-scale and distributed battery storage projects.

As of 2026, the company operated in approximately ten countries and employed around 200 people.

=== Israel ===
Nofar's Israeli operations include solar installations on commercial and agricultural rooftops, ground-mounted facilities, floating solar installations and battery storage systems.

The company was an early participant in the development of photovoltaic installations in Israeli kibbutzim and later expanded into floating solar systems installed on water reservoirs.

=== Spain ===
Nofar developed several utility-scale photovoltaic projects in Spain, including the Olmedilla and Sabinar solar projects.

The Olmedilla photovoltaic project has a capacity of approximately 169 MW and began commercial operation in July 2022. According to Nofar, its construction cost was approximately €130 million.

The adjacent Sabinar development comprises several stages. Sabinar I has a capacity of approximately 155 MW, while planned additional stages are intended to increase the complex's total capacity.

=== Romania ===
In Romania, Nofar developed the Rătești Solar Park, a photovoltaic power station with an installed capacity of approximately 155 MW.

The project was among the largest photovoltaic facilities in Romania when it became operational. Nofar reported a construction cost of approximately €98 million.

By 2024, the connection of Rătești and other new facilities contributed to an increase in Nofar's electricity sales. During the twelve months preceding the second quarter of 2024, the company connected approximately 505 MW of new solar capacity in Europe and Israel.

=== United Kingdom ===
Nofar operates in the British energy storage market. Its projects include Cellarhead, a utility-scale battery storage development with a grid connection of approximately 300–349 MW.

=== United States ===
Nofar entered the United States market through investments in renewable energy development companies and operates there through Nofar USA and BlueSky Utility.

Nofar acquired a 67% stake in BlueSky Utility, a developer of commercial and industrial solar and storage systems, for approximately US$91 million.

Nofar USA focuses primarily on utility-scale solar and battery storage projects, while BlueSky Utility develops distributed commercial and industrial systems.

In 2026, Nofar USA acquired a portfolio of approximately 1 GW of operating and development-stage solar assets from Pine Gate Renewables. The portfolio included projects in Texas, Alabama, South Carolina and North Carolina.

== Major projects ==
Among Nofar Energy's principal renewable energy projects are:

| Project | Country | Type | Capacity | Status |
|---|---|---|---|---|
| Rătești | Romania | Solar photovoltaic | 155 MW | Operational |
| Olmedilla | Spain | Solar photovoltaic | 169 MW | Operational |
| Sabinar I | Spain | Solar photovoltaic | 155 MW | Operational/development |
| Cellarhead | United Kingdom | Battery storage | 300–349 MW grid connection | Development |

== Corporate affairs ==
=== Management ===
Nofar was founded by Ofer Yannay, who served for many years as the company's chairman and controlling shareholder.

Following the departure of co-chief executives Nadav Tene and Shahar Gershon, Yannay assumed the position of chief executive officer.

=== Ownership ===
Nofar Energy is listed on the Tel Aviv Stock Exchange under the ticker NOFR. Yannay has remained the company's principal controlling shareholder since its public offering.

In 2025, Yannay and Leumi Partners established Yannay Group, a holding company through which they hold part of their interest in Nofar Energy. Yannay owns 80% of Yannay Group and Leumi Partners owns 20%.

== Financial performance ==
Nofar's expansion following its 2020 IPO was financed through a combination of equity offerings, project financing and institutional investment.

In October 2021, the company raised NIS 550 million from institutional investors.

In the second quarter of 2024, Nofar reported an operating profit of NIS 13.7 million, compared with an operating loss of NIS 12.6 million in the corresponding quarter of the previous year. Revenue from electricity sales increased by 13%, partly as a result of newly connected solar facilities in Israel and Europe.

In 2024, Israeli credit-rating agency Midroog assigned Nofar an A3 rating with a stable outlook, citing factors including its geographic diversification, increasing cash flows and development portfolio.

In May 2026, Nofar's market capitalization exceeded NIS 10 billion during a rise in its share price.

== See also ==
- Solar power in Israel
- Renewable energy in Israel
- Energy storage
- Ofer Yannay
