= Eli Kaneti =

Israeli basketball coach

Eli Kaneti (Hebrew: אלי קנטי) is an Israeli basketball coach.

Eli Kaneti coached Maccabi Tel Aviv in 1993 and Kiryat Motzkin in 1999. He coached Bnei Herzliya in 2002 but was replaced mid-season by assistant coach Israel Lev, after the team experienced a losing streak.

In 2007, he coached Hapoel Galil Elyon. In 2011, he was brought back to coach the team, replacing Oded Katash.
