= Mike Largey =

American basketball player (born 1960)

Personal information
- Born: August 9, 1960 (age 66) Red Bank, New Jersey
- Listed height: 6 ft 8 in (2.03 m)
- Listed weight: 230 lb (104 kg)

Career information
- High school: Red Bank Catholic (Red Bank, New Jersey)
- College: Upsala (1978–1982)
- NBA draft: 1982: 3rd round, 58th overall pick
- Drafted by: Washington Bullets
- Position: Power forward
- Stats at Basketball Reference

Michael Patrick Largey (born August 9, 1960) is an American former professional basketball player. He played the power forward position. He and two of his college basketball teammates were nicknamed the "Bruise Brothers" by their college coach. He played four seasons in the Israeli Basketball Premier League, from 1984 to 1987.

== Biography ==
Largey was born in Red Bank, New Jersey. He was listed at 6 feet 8 inches (2.03 m) and 230 pounds (100 kg). He was raised in the Port Monmouth section of Middletown Township, New Jersey and attended Red Bank Catholic High School.

He then attended Upsala College. Largey played basketball for the Upsala Vikings from 1978 to 1982. He was named to the 1981–82 National Association of Basketball Coaches Division III All-America Team. He also played for the football team for two seasons, as a place-kicker.

He was drafted 58th overall by the Washington Bullets in the third round of the 1982 NBA draft. Largey played one season with the Maine Lumberjacks of the Continental Basketball Association.

Largey played four seasons in the Israeli Basketball Premier League. He played in all of them for Hapoel Tel Aviv, from 1984 to 1987, averaging a career-high 25.2 points per game in 1986.

He later became a systems analyst for AT&T.
