= Rătești =

- Commune
- Location in Romania
- Coordinates: 44°44′N 25°08′E
- Country: Romania
- County: Argeș
- Population (2021-12-01): 2,779
- Time zone: EET/EEST (UTC+2/+3)
- Vehicle reg.: AG

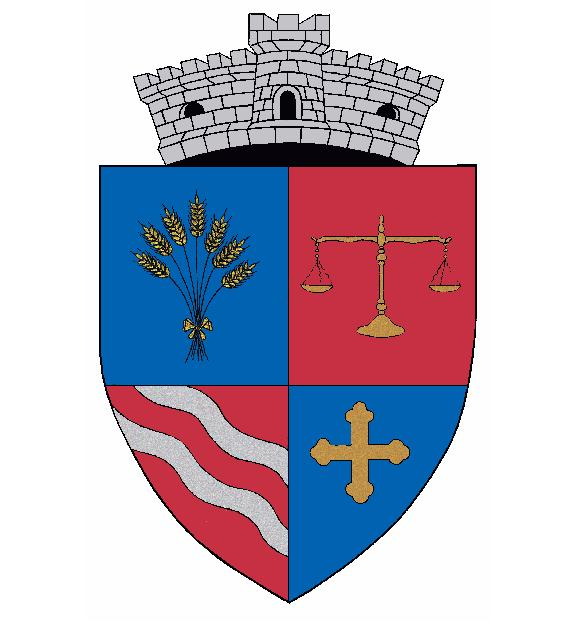
Coat of arms of Rătești commune, Argeș County, Romania.

Rătești is a commune in Argeș County, Muntenia, Romania. It is composed of seven villages: Ciupa-Mănciulescu, Furduești, Mavrodolu, Nejlovelu, Pătuleni, Rătești and Tigveni.
