= Erez Edelstein =

Israeli basketball coach

Erez Edelstein ארז אדלשטיין
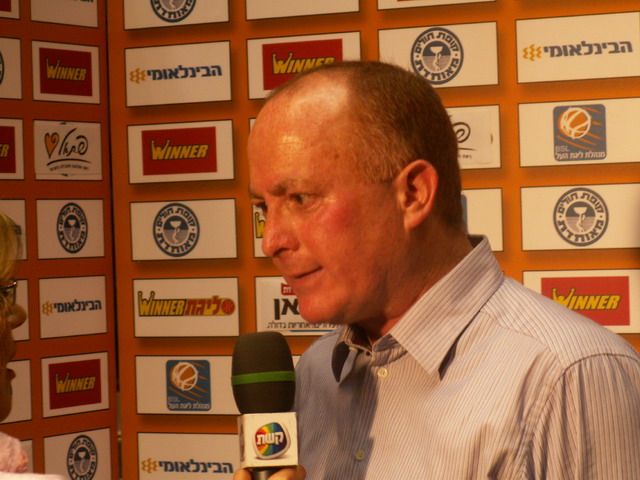
- Edelstein in 2004

Personal information
- Born: August 23, 1961 (age 65)
- Position: Head coach
- Coaching career: 1990–present

Career history

Coaching
- 1990–1991: Hapoel Gvat/Yagur (assistant)
- 1991–1993: Hapoel Gvat/Yagur
- 1993–1994: Maccabi Kiryat Motzkin
- 1994–1995: Maccabi Hadera
- 1995–1997: Hapoel Jerusalem (assistant)
- 1997–1999: Bnei Herzliya
- 1999–2000: Hapoel Galil Elyon
- 2000–2001: MaccabI Ramat Gan
- 2001–2002: Hapoel Jerusalem
- 2002–2004: Hapoel Tel Aviv
- 2005–2006: Hapoel Jerusalem
- 2006–2008: Olympiacos (assistant)
- 2008–2010: Israel (assistant)
- 2011–2014: Hapoel Tel Aviv
- 2014–2017: Israel
- 2016: Maccabi Tel Aviv

Erez Edelstein (Hebrew: ארז אדלשטיין; born August 23, 1961) is an Israeli basketball coach.

== Coaching career ==
In 2014, Edelstein was hired as a head coach of the Israel national basketball team.

On June 9, 2016, Edelstein was announced as the new head coach of Maccabi Tel Aviv. On October 22, 2016, he parted ways with the club.

On September 13, 2017, Edelstein parted ways with the Israel national basketball team after a disappointing Eurobasket campaign.
