= Eurocup 2013–14 Regular Season Group E =

Standings and Results for Group E of the Regular Season phase of the 2013–14 Eurocup basketball tournament.

== Standings ==
	Team	Pld	W	L	PF	PA	Diff	Tie-break
1.	(Russia) Khimki	10	9	1	870	751	+119	
2.	(Israel) Hapoel Jerusalem	10	6	4	777	767	+10	
3.	(Turkey) Pınar Karşıyaka	10	5	5	805	806	–1	
4.	(Bulgaria) Lukoil Academic	10	4	6	728	756	–28	
5.	(Romania) CSU Asesoft	10	3	7	794	832	–38	2–0
6.	(Bosnia and Herzegovina) Igokea	10	3	7	746	808	–62	0–2

Source: Euroleague Basketball

== Fixtures and results ==
=== Game 1 ===
16 October 2013
17:30 CET

Boxscore

Khimki (Russia)	89–97	(Romania) CSU Asesoft
Scoring by quarter: 22–28, 21–27, 21–8, 25–34
Pts: Augustine, Green 17; Rebs: four players 4 Asts: Green 7		Pts: Lee 24; Rebs: Mohammed 8 Asts: Flowers 5

Basketball Center, Khimki
Attendance: 1,050
Referees: Roberto Chiari (ITA), Ingus Baumanis (LAT), Josip Radojkovic (CRO)

16 October 2013
19:30 CET

Boxscore

Hapoel Jerusalem (Israel)	84–76	(Bulgaria) Lukoil Academic
Scoring by quarter: 21–15, 15–24, 25–16, 23–21
Pts: Parakhouski 21; Rebs: Dupree 9 Asts: Kitchen 9		Pts: Videnov 17; Rebs: Marčinković 7 Asts: D. White, Verginis 4

Malha Arena, Jerusalem
Attendance: 1,600
Referees: Emin Mogulkoc (TUR), Sasa Maricic (SRB), Uros Obrknezevic (SRB)

16 October 2013
19:00 CET

Boxscore

Pınar Karşıyaka (Turkey)	90–60	(Bosnia and Herzegovina) Igokea
Scoring by quarter: 28–18, 15–15, 31–12, 16–15
Pts: Dixon 22; Rebs: Batista 10; Asts: Altıntığ 5		Pts: Nikolić 11; Rebs: Dozet 6 Asts: Gordić 3

Karşıyaka Arena, İzmir
Attendance: 2,500
Referees: Radomir Vojinovic (MNE), Zdravko Rutesic (MNE), Aleksandar Milojevic (MKD)

=== Game 2 ===
23 October 2013
17:00 CET

Boxscore

Lukoil Academic (Bulgaria)	79–85	(Russia) Khimki
Scoring by quarter: 23–22, 20–21, 22–22, 14–20
Pts: White 18; Rebs: Achara 8 Asts: three players 3		Pts: Popović 27; Rebs: Monia 9 Asts: Koponen 5

Universiada Hall, Sofia
Attendance: 1,000
Referees: Panagiotis Anastopoulos (GRE), Radomir Vojinovic (MNE), Omer Esteron (ISR)

23 October 2013
18:30 CET

Boxscore

CSU Asesoft (Romania)	72–80	(Turkey) Pınar Karşıyaka
Scoring by quarter: 15–11, 11–25, 19–22, 27–22
Pts: Adamović 19; Rebs: Tica, Zeković 5 Asts: Burlacu 3		Pts: Dixon 25; Rebs: Batista 11; Asts: Dixon 6

Olimpia Sports Hall, Ploiești
Attendance: 3,600
Referees: Spiros Gkontas (GRE), Haris Bijedic (BIH), Uros Obrknezevic (SRB)

23 October 2013
20:15 CET

Boxscore

Igokea (Bosnia and Herzegovina)	67–74	(Israel) Hapoel Jerusalem
Scoring by quarter: 16–17, 15–17, 24–15, 12–25
Pts: Galloway 13; Rebs: Jorović, Galloway 4 Asts: Knežević 3		Pts: Kitchen 17; Rebs: Dupree 7 Asts: Rosen, Kitchen 3

Laktaši Sports Hall, Laktaši
Attendance: 500
Referees: Sergiy Zashchuk (UKR), Ioannis Foufis (GRE), Jasmina Juras (SRB)

=== Game 3 ===
30 October 2013
18:15 CET

Boxscore

Hapoel Jerusalem (Israel)	80–87 (OT)	(Russia) Khimki
Scoring by quarter: 13–21, 21–19, 18–17, 16–11, Overtime: 8–8, 4–11
Pts: Duncan 23; Rebs: Kadir, Parakhouski 8 Asts: Halperin 5		Pts: Koponen 20; Rebs: Monia 10; Asts: Koponen 6

Malha Arena, Jerusalem
Attendance: 2,000
Referees: Gianluca Mattioli (ITA), Marko Juras (SRB), Petros Papapetrou (GRE)

30 October 2013
19:00 CET

Boxscore

Pınar Karşıyaka (Turkey)	84–69	(Bulgaria) Lukoil Academic
Scoring by quarter: 24–17, 17–23, 19–16, 24–13
Pts: Dixon 24; Rebs: Lyons 9 Asts: Dixon 7		Pts: Tucker 13; Rebs: Lalić 9 Asts: White 6

Karşıyaka Arena, İzmir
Attendance: 4,000
Referees: Dani Hierrezuelo (ESP), Matej Boltauzer (SLO), Josip Radojkovic (CRO)

30 October 2013
20:15 CET

Boxscore

Igokea (Bosnia and Herzegovina)	77–84	(Romania) CSU Asesoft
Scoring by quarter: 22–18, 12–27, 24–16, 19–23
Pts: Bunić 21; Rebs: Štemberger 6 Asts: Štemberger 7		Pts: Zeković 25; Rebs: Lee 7 Asts: Mohammed 6

Laktaši Sports Hall, Laktaši
Attendance: 500
Referees: Andrej Jersan (SLO), Anastasios Piloidis (GRE), David Romano (ISR)

=== Game 4 ===
6 November 2013
16:00 CET

Boxscore

Khimki (Russia)	80–66	(Turkey) Pınar Karşıyaka
Scoring by quarter: 15–23, 22–11, 15–17, 28–15
Pts: Davis 18; Rebs: three players 5 Asts: Green 6		Pts: Batista 20; Rebs: Batista 6 Asts: Dixon 8

Basketball Center, Khimki
Attendance: 1,050
Referees: Borys Ryzhyk (UKR), Aare Halliko (FIN), Piotr Pastusiak (POL)

6 November 2013
17:00 CET

Boxscore

Lukoil Academic (Bulgaria)	61–70	(Bosnia and Herzegovina) Igokea
Scoring by quarter: 16–19, 18–17, 18–19, 9–15
Pts: Videnov 14; Rebs: Videnov 8 Asts: White 4		Pts: Nikolić 19; Rebs: Nikolić 10; Asts: Štemberger 5

Universiada Hall, Sofia
Attendance: 1,000
Referees: Elias Koromilas (GRE), Petros Papapetrou (GRE), Ilya Putenko (RUS)

6 November 2013
18:30 CET

Boxscore

Hapoel Jerusalem (Israel)	82–80	(Romania) CSU Asesoft
Scoring by quarter: 17–14, 20–25, 21–15, 24–26
Pts: Duncan 19; Rebs: four players 5 Asts: Duncan, Dupree 4		Pts: Adamović 18; Rebs: Lee 7 Asts: Adamović, Mohammed 5

Malha Arena, Jerusalem
Attendance: 1,800
Referees: Ersan Kartal (TUR), Aleksandar Milojevic (MKD), Milos Koljensic (MNE)

=== Game 5 ===
13 November 2013
18:30 CET

Boxscore

CSU Asesoft (Romania)	72–85	(Bulgaria) Lukoil Academic
Scoring by quarter: 20–17, 11–21, 19–22, 22–25
Pts: Three players 16; Rebs: Lee 11; Asts: Adamović, Burlacu 3		Pts: White 18; Rebs: Lalić 10; Asts: Verginis, White 6

Olimpia Sports Hall, Ploiești
Attendance: 2,000
Referees: Recep Ankarali (TUR), Igor Dragojevic (MNE), Regis Bardera (FRA)

13 November 2013
19:00 CET

Boxscore

Pınar Karşıyaka (Turkey)	81–80	(Israel) Hapoel Jerusalem
Scoring by quarter: 25–22, 23–12, 16–23, 17–23
Pts: Dixon 22; Rebs: Batista 8 Asts: Dixon 8		Pts: Halperin 19; Rebs: Parakhouski 10; Asts: Halperin 5

Karşıyaka Arena, İzmir
Attendance: 4,000
Referees: Guerrino Cerebuch (ITA), Sergiy Chebyshev (UKR), Carlos Cortes (ESP)

13 November 2013
20:15 CET

Boxscore

Igokea (Bosnia and Herzegovina)	86–91 (OT)	(Russia) Khimki
Scoring by quarter: 17–18, 24–14, 17–20, 11–17, Overtime: 17–22
Pts: Nikolić, Gordić 14; Rebs: Mirković 8 Asts: Gordić 7		Pts: Davis 22; Rebs: Green 8 Asts: Green 8

Laktaši Sports Hall, Laktaši
Attendance: 1,000
Referees: Srdan Dozai (CRO), Sinisa Herceg (CRO), Gentian Cici (ALB)

=== Game 6 ===
20 November 2013
17:00 CET

Boxscore

Lukoil Academic (Bulgaria)	76–63	(Israel) Hapoel Jerusalem
Scoring by quarter: 19–17, 20–20, 18–13, 19–13
Pts: Tucker 29; Rebs: Achara 7 Asts: White 8		Pts: Duncan 15; Rebs: Dupree 10; Asts: Seven players 1

Armeets Arena, Sofia
Attendance: 3,000
Referees: Andrej Jersan (SLO), Oscar Perea (ESP), Gentian Cici (ALB)

20 November 2013
18:30 CET

Boxscore

CSU Asesoft (Romania)	72–95	(Russia) Khimki
Scoring by quarter: 15–22, 21–25, 21–22, 15–26
Pts: Adamović, Marshall 15; Rebs: Zeković 6 Asts: Adamović 4		Pts: Vyaltsev 15; Rebs: Davis 8 Asts: Green 8

Olimpia Sports Hall, Ploiești
Attendance: 2,400
Referees: Boris Shulga (UKR), Panagiotis Anastopoulos (GRE), Saverio Lanzarini (ITA)

20 November 2013
20:15 CET

Boxscore

Igokea (Bosnia and Herzegovina)	110–98 (OT)	(Turkey) Pınar Karşıyaka
Scoring by quarter: 18–17, 17–17, 15–27, 24–13, Overtime: 36–24
Pts: Jorović 27; Rebs: Bunić 9 Asts: Gordić 10		Pts: Batista 27; Rebs: Batista 16; Asts: Dixon 9

Laktaši Sports Hall, Laktaši
Attendance: 800
Referees: Damir Javor (SLO), Marius Ciulin (ROM), Markos Michaelides (SUI)

=== Game 7 ===
26 November 2013
16:30 CET

Boxscore

Khimki (Russia)	83–55	(Bulgaria) Lukoil Academic
Scoring by quarter: 25–11, 15–10, 17–22, 26–12
Pts: Davis 20; Rebs: Augustine 8 Asts: Koponen 8		Pts: Tucker 19; Rebs: Achara 9 Asts: Achara 2

Basketball Center, Moscow
Attendance: 1,100
Referees: Carmelo Paternico (ITA), Marius Ciulin (ROM), David Romano (ISR)

27 November 2013
18:30 CET

Boxscore

Hapoel Jerusalem (Israel)	85–71	(Bosnia and Herzegovina) Igokea
Scoring by quarter: 27–16, 21–17, 19–16, 18–22
Pts: Dupree 22; Rebs: Parakhouski 12; Asts: Eliyahu, Kitchen 6		Pts: Jorović 15; Rebs: Jorović, Gipson 8 Asts: Gipson 5

Malha Arena, Jerusalem
Attendance: 1,900
Referees: Paolo Taurino (ITA), Nicola Maestre (FRA), Uros Obrknezevic (SRB)

27 November 2013
19:00 CET

Boxscore

Pınar Karşıyaka (Turkey)	91–87	(Romania) CSU Asesoft
Scoring by quarter: 28–18, 18–21, 18–25, 27–23
Pts: Dixon 28; Rebs: Batista 9 Asts: Altıntığ 4		Pts: Lee 24; Rebs: Lee 8 Asts: Adamović, Marshall 4

Karşıyaka Arena, İzmir
Attendance: 2,000
Referees: Srdan Dozai (CRO), Andrej Lovsin (SLO), Omer Esteron (ISR)

=== Game 8 ===
4 December 2013
16:30 CET

Boxscore

Khimki (Russia)	85–73	(Israel) Hapoel Jerusalem
Scoring by quarter: 23-17, 20–17, 18–24, 24–15
Pts: Davis 22; Rebs: Davis 8 Asts: Green 9		Pts: Halperin, Parakhouski 19; Rebs: Kitchen, Eliyahu 6 Asts: Halperin 4

Basketball Center, Moscow
Attendance: 1,050
Referees: Christos, Christodoulou (GRE), Olegs, Larisevs (LAT), Carlos, Peruga (ESP)

4 December 2013
17:00 CET

Boxscore

Lukoil Academic (Bulgaria)	74–64	(Turkey) Pınar Karşıyaka
Scoring by quarter: 20–18, 19–20, 15–10, 20–16
Pts: Tucker 18; Rebs: Tucker 8 Asts: White 6		Pts: Dixon 20; Rebs: Lyons 8 Asts: Senturk 6

Armeets Arena, Sofia
Attendance: 1,700
Referees: Roberto Chiari (ITA), Emilio Perez Pizarro (ESP), Mario Majkic (SLO)

4 December 2013
19:00 CET

Boxscore

CSU Asesoft (Romania)	84–74	(Bosnia and Herzegovina) Igokea
Scoring by quarter: 23–14, 25-18, 18-24, 18–18
Pts: Mohammed 24; Rebs: Lee 6 Asts: Dunn 7		Pts: Gordic 14; Rebs: Bunić, Dozet 6 Asts: Gordic 3

Olimpia Sports Hall, Ploiești
Attendance: 2600
Referees: Rustu Nuran (TUR), Gianluca Mattioli (ITA), Moritz Reiter (GER)

=== Game 9 ===
11 December 2013
18:30 CET

Boxscore

CSU Asesoft (Romania)	69–77	(Israel) Hapoel Jerusalem
Scoring by quarter: 17-21, 18-22, 25-17, 16-17
Pts: Mohammed 23; Rebs: Lee 10; Asts: Dunn 5		Pts: Duncan 16; Rebs: Duncan 9 Asts: Halperin, Kitchen 6

Olimpia Sports Hall, Ploiești
Attendance: 2,200
Referees: Sinisa Herceg (CRO), Tomislav Vovk (CRO), Aleksandar Milojevic (MKD)

11 December 2013
19:00 CET

Boxscore

Pınar Karşıyaka (Turkey)	76–95	(Russia) Khimki
Scoring by quarter: 22–32, 15–23, 21–25, 18–15
Pts: Batista 18; Rebs: Hersek 8 Asts: Altıntığ 7		Pts: Davis 21; Rebs: Augustine 7 Asts: Green 5

Karşıyaka Arena, İzmir
Attendance: 4,000
Referees: Jose Martin (ESP), Radomir Vojinovic (MNE), Petros Papapetrou (GRE)

11 December 2013
20:15 CET

Boxscore

Igokea (Bosnia and Herzegovina)	74–61	(Bulgaria) Lukoil Academic
Scoring by quarter: 23–17, 12–22, 18–9, 21–13
Pts: Gordić 16; Rebs: Nikolić 9 Asts: Gordić 4		Pts: Tucker 17; Rebs: Lalić 7 Asts: four players 2

Laktaši Sports Hall, Laktaši
Attendance: 1,000
Referees: Robert Vyklicky (CZE), Sergiy Zashchuk (UKR), Tomasz Trawicki (POL)

=== Game 10 ===
17 December 2013
17:00 CET

Boxscore

Lukoil Academic (Bulgaria)	92–77	(Romania) CSU Asesoft
Scoring by quarter: 29–17, 18–19, 26–20, 19–21
Pts: Tucker 30; Rebs: Tucker 11; Asts: Avramov 6		Pts: Dunn 22; Rebs: Lee 12; Asts: Dunn 5

Universiada Hall, Sofia
Attendance: 500
Referees: Anastasios Piloidis (GRE), Aare Halliko (FIN), Semen Ovinov (RUS)

18 December 2013
16:30 CET

Boxscore

Khimki (Russia)	80–67	(Bosnia and Herzegovina) Igokea
Scoring by quarter: 20–22, 25–10, 15–20, 20–15
Pts: Monia, Popović 17; Rebs: Green 7 Asts: Green 10		Pts: Dozet 20; Rebs: Jorović 10; Asts: Jorović 5

Basketball Center, Khimki
Attendance: 2,000
Referees: Petri Mantyla (FIN), Oskars Lucis (LAT), Miroslav Tomov (BUL)

18 December 2013
18:30 CET

Boxscore

Hapoel Jerusalem (Israel)	79–75	(Turkey) Pınar Karşıyaka
Scoring by quarter: 19–23, 21–12, 21–17, 18–23
Pts: Dupree 13; Rebs: Eliyahu 6 Asts: three players 4		Pts: Diebler 20; Rebs: Altıntığ 6 Asts: Dixon 9

Malha Arena, Jerusalem
Attendance: 1,800
Referees: Grzegorz Ziemblicki (POL), Marko Juras (SRB), Sergiy Zashchuk (UKR)
