= 2011–12 Israeli Basketball Super League =

2011–2012 Ligat Loto ^{1}
- Duration: 16 October 2011 – 24 May 2012
- Teams: 11

Regular season
- Season MVP: (Israel) Lior Eliyahu

Finals
- Champions: Maccabi Tel Aviv; 50th title
- Runners-up: Maccabi Ashdod
- Finals MVP: (Israel) Meir Tapiro
- ^1 Sponsored league name, referring to Loto.

The 2011–2012 Israeli Basketball Super League was the 58th season of the top basketball league in Israel. The season began on 16 October 2011 and ended on 24 May 2012.

Maccai Tel Aviv won the championship title for the 50th time.

== Format ==
Each of the 11 participating teams play 20 regular league games, one home game and one away game against each other team. After that, there is 3rd round in which every team play against each other team once. The top eight teams advance to the playoff, where they play best-of-5 series decided by the rankings at the end of the regular season (first against eighth, second against seventh and so on). The series winners play in the Final Four to determine the championship. The two 9th and 10th ranked teams compete in a best-of-5 series relegation playoff, and the loser will be relegated to Liga Leumit 2012–2013.

== Team information ==
Teams 2011-12

=== Stadia and locations ===
Team	Home city	Stadium	Capacity
Barak Netanya	Netanya	Yeshurun	1,000
Bnei HaSharon/Herzliya	Herzliya	HaYovel Herzliya	1,750
Hapoel Gilboa Galil	Gilboa Regional Council	Gan Ner Sports Hall	2,400
Hapoel Holon	Holon	Holon City Arena	2,850
Hapoel Jerusalem	Jerusalem	Malha Arena	3,000
Ironi Ashkelon	Ashkelon	Ashkelon Sport Arena	3,000
Maccabi Ashdod	Ashdod	HaKiriya Arena	1,260
Habik'a B.C.	Ganei Tikva, Giv'at Shmuel, Kiryat Ono	Leader Arena	1,400
Maccabi Haifa	Haifa	Romema Arena	3,000
Maccabi Rishon LeZion	Rishon LeZion	Bet Maccabi	2,500
Maccabi Tel Aviv	Tel Aviv	Nokia Arena	10,383

=== Head coaches ===
Team	Head coach	Seasons as head coach
Barak Netanya	Danny Franco	1
Bnei HaSharon/Herzliya	Adi Azulay	1
Hapoel Gilboa Galil	Lior Lubin	2
Hapoel Holon	Dan Shamir	1
Hapoel Jerusalem	Sharon Drucker	3
Ironi Ashkelon	Eric Alfasi	1
Maccabi Ashdod	Ofer Berkovich	2
Habik'a B.C.	Avi Ashkenazi	1
Maccabi Haifa	Mickey Gorka	2
Maccabi Rishon LeZion	Effi Birnbaum	3
Maccabi Tel Aviv	David Blatt	4

== Regular season ==
	Team	Pld	W	L	PF	PA	Diff	Pts	Qualification or relegation
1.	Maccabi Tel Aviv	25	23	2	2218	1897	+321	48	2012–13 Euroleague Group stage
2.	Hapoel Gilboa Galil	25	16	9	1955	1909	+46	41	
3.	Maccabi Rishon LeZion	25	15	10	1986	1917	+69	40	
4.	Hapoel Jerusalem	25	14	11	2043	1969	+74	39	
5.	Hapoel Holon	25	14	11	2041	1972	+69	39	
6.	Ironi Ashkelon	25	10	15	1965	2107	-142	35	
7.	Maccabi Ashdod	24	12	12	1987	1979	+8	36	
8.	Habik'a B.C.	24	10	14	1848	1883	–35	34	
9.	Barak Netanya	24	9	15	1948	1977	–29	33	
10.	Bnei HaSharon/Herzliya	24	7	17	1918	2165	–247	31	
11.	Maccabi Haifa	24	5	19	1951	2085	-134	29	

Qualification to Playoffs

Pld – Played; W – Won; L – Lost; PF – Points for; PA – Points against; Diff – Difference; Pts – Points.

=== Rounds 1-2 ===
	BNT	BNS	HPG	HPH	HPJ	IAS	MAS	MHA	HBC	MRL	MTA	Rec.
Barak Netanya		97-77	86-74	75-98	79-85	92-73	86-90	96-75	88-80	65-80	70-85	5-5
Bnei HaSharon/Herzliya	93-102		82-84	85-89	63-102	101-96	69-91	84-82	95-92	59-82	73-113	3-7
Hapoel Gilboa Galil	78–81	73-61		85-61	89-68	79-76	97-75	85-72	75-67	75-74	60–95	8-2
Hapoel Holon	71-70	119-80	89-80		70-65	87-91	93-84	83-53	72-59	87-83	77-82	8-2
Hapoel Jerusalem	88-83	99-96	67-79	80-69		93-95	84-73	95-76	87-61	88-87	100-104	7-3
Ironi Ashkelon	84-86	84-85	60-81	73-71	83-74		87-85	80-77	87-85	81-79	83-87	6-4
Maccabi Ashdod	82-71	89-53	74-76	97-98	84-83	79-89		85-86	83-72	69-76	74-103	4-6
Maccabi Haifa	104-94	79-89	90-77	91-104	93-96	80-81	74-84		76-78	102-105	79-84	2-8
Habik'a B.C.	79-56	76-74	77-84	68-66	81-59	93-74	74-88	81-80		76-81	76-88	6-4
Maccabi Rishon LeZion	79-69	90-80	83-88	88-77	69-64	84-79	69-80	76-74	78-66		75-76	7-3
Maccabi Tel Aviv	87-85	92-75	102-61	84-75	64-78	108-75	73-78	87-81	89-79	90-73		8-2
Record	5-5	3-7	8-2	8-2	7-3	6-4	4-6	2-8	6-4	7-3	8-2	

The home team is listed on the left-hand column.
The rightmost column and the bottom row list the teams' home and away records respectively.

== Playoffs ==
The Quarter Finals were played as The-Best-of-5 series, while the Semifinals and the final were 1 match stages.

Quarterfinals
1	Maccabi Tel Aviv	3
8	Habik'a B.C.	0
4	Hapoel Jerusalem	1
5	Hapoel Holon	3
2	Hapoel Gilboa Galil	1
7	Maccabi Ashdod	3
3	Maccabi Rishon LeZion	3
6	Ironi Ashkelon	2

Semifinals; 22 May
1	Maccabi Tel Aviv	102
5	Hapoel Holon	73
7	Maccabi Ashdod	75
3	Maccabi Rishon LeZion	68

Final; 24 May
1	Maccabi Tel Aviv	83
7	Maccabi Ashdod	63

Israeli Basketball Super League 2012 Champions

Maccabi Tel Aviv
50th title

== Stats Leaders ==
=== Efficiency ===
Rank	Name	Team	Efficiency	Games	EPG
1.	(United States) Bryant Dunston	Hapoel Holon	617	25	24.68
2.	(United States) Brian Asbury	Barak Netanya	521	24	21.71
3.	(United States) Romeo Travis	Hapoel Gilboa Galil	514	24	21.42
4.	(United States) Josh Duncan	Maccabi Ashdod	400	19	21.05
5.	(United States) Dwayne Mitchell	Ironi Ashkelon	452	22	20.55

=== Points ===
Rank	Name	Team	Points	Games	PPG
1.	(United States) Adrian Banks	Barak Netanya	494	23	21.48
2.	(United States) Tweety Carter	Bnei HaSharon\Herzliya	475	23	20.65
3.	(Israel) Sylven Landesberg	Maccabi Haifa	475	23	20.65
4.	(United States) Joe Crawford	Maccabi Rishon LeZion	461	23	20.04
5.	(United States) Ron Lewis	Hapoel Holon	477	25	19.08

=== Rebounds ===
Rank	Name	Team	Rebounds	Games	RPG
1.	(United States) Bryant Dunston	Hapoel Holon	235	25	9.4
2.	(Israel) Isaac Rosefelt	Bnei HaSharon\Herzliya	148	16	9.25
3.	(United States) Josh Duncan	Maccabi Ashdod	163	19	8.58
4.	(United States) Alex Tyus	Maccabi Ashdod	200	24	8.33
5.	(United States) Brandon Bowman	Maccabi Rishon LeZion	189	23	8.22

=== Assists ===
Rank	Name	Team	Assists	Games	APG
1.	(Israel) Moran Roth	Hapoel Holon	167	21	7.95
2.	(Israel) Meir Tapiro	Maccabi Ashdod	178	24	7.42
3.	(United States) Tweety Carter	Bnei HaSharon\Herzliya	163	23	7.09
4.	(United States) Chris Thomas	Hapoel Gilboa Galil	92	19	4.84
5.	(United States) Dwayne Mitchell	Ironi Ashkelon	105	22	4.77

== All-Star Game ==
The 2012 Israeli League All-star event was held on March 8, 2012, at the Ashkelon Sports Arena.

Israeli All-Stars
Pos	Player	Team
Starters
G	(Israel) Yuval Naimy	Hapoel Jerusalem
G	(Israel) Meir Tapiro	Maccabi Ashdod
G	(Israel) (United States) Sylven Landesberg	Maccabi Haifa
F	(Israel) Lior Eliyahu	Maccabi Tel Aviv
F	(Israel) Elishay Kadir	Hapoel Jerusalem
Reserves
G	(Israel) Nitzan Hanochi	Maccabi Rishon LeZion
G	(Israel) Niv Berkowitz	Ironi Ashkelon
G	(Israel) (Argentina) Ezequiel Skverer	Habik'a B.C.
G	(Israel) Yehu Orland	Barak Netanya
C	(Israel) (United States) Isaac Rosefelt	Bnei Hasharon
Head coach: (Israel) Effi Birnbaum (Maccabi Rishon LeZion)

International All-Stars
Pos	Player	Team
Starters
G	(United States) Tweety Carter	Bnei Hasharon
G	(United States) Adrian Banks	Barak Netanya
G	(United States) Dwayne Mitchell	Ironi Ashkelon
F	(United States) Richard Hendrix	Maccabi Tel Aviv
C	(United States) Bryant Dunston	Hapoel Holon
Reserves
G	(United States) Paul Delaney	Habik'a B.C.
G	(United States) Jermaine Jackson	Maccabi Haifa
F	(United States) Josh Carter	Maccabi Ashdod
F	(United States) Romeo Travis	Hapoel Gilboa Galil
F	(United States) Brandon Bowman	Maccabi Rishon LeZion
C	(United States) Marco Killingsworth	Ironi Ashkelon
Head coach: (Israel) Dan Shamir (Hapoel Holon)

March 8, 2012

Report

Israeli All-Stars	113–109	International All-Stars
Scoring by quarter: 36-34, 26-25, 24-26, 27-24
Pts: Kadir 40; Rebs: Landesberg 5 Asts: Tapiro 10		Pts: Bowman & Mitchell 17; Rebs: Killingsworth 8 Asts: Delaney 7

Ashkelon Sports Arena

=== Three-point shootout ===
Contestants
Pos.	Player	Team	First round	Final round
G	(Israel) Amit Simhon (W)	Ironi Ashkelon	18	13
G	(United States) Ron Lewis	Hapoel Holon	14	10
F	(United States) (Israel) David Blu	Maccabi Tel Aviv	13	-
G	(Israel) Yehu Orland	Barak Netanya	13	-
F	(United States) Dion Dowell	Habik'a B.C.	12	-
G	(United States) Yuval Naimy	Hapoel Jerusalem	11	-

=== Slam Dunk Contest ===
Contestants
Pos.	Player	Team
F	(Israel) Roei Buchbinder (W)	Bnei Hasharon
F	(United States) Brandon Bowman	Maccabi Rishon LeZion
G	(United States) Adrian Banks	Barak Netanya

== Awards ==
=== Regular season MVP ===
- (Israel) Lior Eliyahu (Maccabi Tel Aviv)

=== All-BSL 1st team ===
- (Israel) Moran Roth (Hapoel Holon)
- (United States) Derwin Kitchen (Maccabi Rishon LeZion)
- (United States) Josh Carter (Maccabi Ashdod)
- (Israel) Lior Eliyahu (Maccabi Tel Aviv)
- (United States) Bryant Dunston (Hapoel Holon)

=== Coach of the season ===
- (Israel) Ofer Berkovich (Maccabi Ashdod)

=== Rising star ===
- (Israel) Ezequiel Skverer (Habik'a B.C.)

=== Best Defender ===
- (Israel) Nitzan Hanochi (Maccabi Rishon LeZion)

=== Most Improved Player ===
- (Israel) Sean Daniel (Hapoel Holon)

=== Sixth Man of the Season ===
- (United States) Alex Tyus (Maccabi Ashdod)

=== Player of the Week ===
Week	Player	Team	Efficiency
1	(Israel) Raviv Limonad	Ironi Ashkelon	42
2	(Israel) Dagan Yivzori	Hapoel Gilboa Galil	19
3	(United States) Bryant Dunston	Hapoel Holon	49
4	(Israel) Lior Eliyahu	Maacabi Tel aviv	35
5	(Israel) Sylven Landesberg	Maccabi Haifa	37
6	(Israel) Yuval Naimy	Hapoel Jerusalem	16
7	(Jamaica) Adrian Uter	Maccabi Rishon LeZion	32
8	(United States) Delroy James	Bnei HaSharon/Herzliya	36
9	(United States) Brian Asbury	Barak Netanya	45
10	(United States) Ron Lewis	Hapoel Holon	51
11	(United States) Brian Asbury	Barak Netanya	48
12	(United States) Derwin Kitchen	Maccabi Rishon LeZion	47
13	(United States) Tweety Carter	Bnei HaSharon\Herzliya	32
14	(United States) Joe Crawford	Maccabi Rishon LeZion	32
15	(United States) Josh Duncan	Maccabi Ashdod	39
16	(United States) Josh Carter	Maccabi Ashdod	38
17	(Israel) Yogev Ohayon	Maacabi Tel aviv	34
18	(United States) Ron Lewis	Hapoel Holon	36
19	(United States) Alex Tyus	Maccabi Ashdod	31
20	(Israel) Yehu Orland	Barak Netanya	24
21	(United States) Adrian Banks	Barak Netanya	19
22	(United States) Joe Crawford	Maccabi Rishon LeZion	38
23	(Israel) Isaac Rosefelt	Bnei HaSharon\Herzliya	42
24	(Israel) Eyal Shulman	Maccabi Rishon LeZion	20
25	(United States) D. J. Strawberry	Hapoel Jerusalem	38
26	(United States) Brian Randle	Hapoel Jerusalem	32
27	(United States) Devin Smith	Maacabi Tel aviv	29

=== Month Awards ===
Month	Weeks	Best player Best coach Young Player	Team	Efficiency W-L
October	1–3	(United States) Bryant Dunston	Hapoel Holon	26.7
October	1–3	(Israel) Eric Alfasi	Ironi Ashkelon	2-1
October	1–3	(Israel) Shlomi Harush	Hapoel Holon	2.7
November	4-7	(Israel) Sylven Landesberg	Maccabi Haifa	26
November	4-7	(Israel) Lior Lubin	Hapoel Gilboa Galil	4-0
November	4-7	(Israel) Ezequiel Skverer	Habik'a B.C.	9
December	8-11	(United States) Brian Asbury	Barak Netanya	35.2
December	8-11	(Israel) Danny Franco	Barak Netanya	4-0
December	8-11	(Israel) Anton Shoutvin	Maccabi Ashdod	3
January	12-15	(United States) Derwin Kitchen	Maccabi Rishon LeZion	37.7
January	12-15	(Israel) Effi Birnbaum	Maccabi Rishon LeZion	3-0
January	12-15	(Israel) Amit Simhon	Ironi Ashkelon	10
February	16-18	(Israel) Yogev Ohayon	Maacabi Tel aviv	17.0
February	16-18	(Israel) David Blatt	Maacabi Tel aviv	2-0
February	16-18	Not Selected		
March	19-22	(Israel) Dror Hajaj	Maccabi Ashdod	19.5
March	19-22	(Israel) Ofer Berkovich	Maccabi Ashdod	3-1
March	19-22	Not Selected		
April	23-27	(United States) D. J. Strawberry	Hapoel Jerusalem	21.6
April	23-27	(Israel) Sharon Drucker	Hapoel Jerusalem	3-2
April	23-27	Not Selected		

== See also ==
- Israeli Basketball League Cup 2012
- Israeli Basketball League Cup 2011
