= 2013–14 Israeli Basketball Super League =

2013–2014 Ligat Winner
- Season: 2013–2014
- Duration: 13 October 2013 - 11 June 2014
- Games played: 172 (regular season)
- Teams: 12
- TV partners: Sports Channel, Channel 1

Regular season
- Top seed: Maccabi Tel Aviv
- Season MVP: (Venezuela) Donta Smith
- Promoted: Ironi Nahariya
- Relegated: Barak Netanya

Finals
- Champions: Maccabi Tel Aviv; 51st title
- Runners-up: Maccabi Haifa
- Semifinalists: Hapoel Jerusalem; Hapoel Eilat
- Finals MVP: (Israel) Dagan Yivzori

Statistical leaders
Points	(United States) Carlon Brown	19.8
Rebounds	(United States) Marcus Dove	9.5
Assists	(Venezuela) Donta Smith	6.1

Records
- Total attendance: 384,200
- Average attendance: 1,950

The 2013–2014 Israeli Basketball Super League (Also known as Ligat Loto) was the 60th season of the Israeli Basketball Super League. The season began on 13 October 2013 and ended on 11 June 2014.

== Teams Information ==
=== Team changes ===
Teams 2013-14

Ironi Ashkelon has been relegated as they finished in the bottom spot last season.
Ironi Nes Ziona has been promoted to the league after winning Ligat Leumit last season.

=== Stadia and locations ===
Team	Home city	Stadium	Capacity	Last season (Regular season)
Barak Netanya	Netanya	Yeshurun	1,000	QF (4th)
Bnei Herzliya	Herzliya	HaYovel Herzliya	1,750	11th
Hapoel Gilboa Galil	Gilboa Regional Council	Gan Ner Sports Hall	2,400	QF (7th)
Hapoel Holon	Holon	Holon City Arena	2,850	9th
Hapoel Jerusalem	Jerusalem	Malha Arena	3,000	SF (5th)
Ironi Nes Ziona	Nes Ziona	Lev Hamoshava	1,200	1st (Ligat Leumit)
Maccabi Ashdod	Ashdod	HaKiriya Arena	1,260	10th
Hapoel Eilat B.C.	Eilat	Begin Arena	1,100	SF (3rd)
Maccabi Haifa	Haifa	Romema Arena	5,000	Champions (2nd)
Maccabi Rishon LeZion	Rishon LeZion	Beit Maccabi Rishon	2,500	QF (6th)
Maccabi Tel Aviv	Tel Aviv	Nokia Arena	10,383	Runners-up (1st)
Hapoel Tel Aviv	Tel Aviv	Hadar Yosef Arena	1,400	QF (8th)

=== Head coaches ===
Team	Head coach	Seasons in the club
Barak Netanya	Yaniv Burger	1
Bnei Herzliya	Muli Katzurin	4 (1st)
Hapoel Gilboa Galil	Sharon Drucker	2 (1st)
Hapoel Holon	Elad Hasin	1
Hapoel Jerusalem	Brad Greenberg	1
Ironi Nes Ziona	Nadav Zilberstein	1
Maccabi Ashdod	Eric Alfasi	1
Hapoel Eilat	Oded Kattash	2
Maccabi Haifa	Danny Franco	1
Maccabi Rishon LeZion	Zvika Sherf	2 (1st)
Maccabi Tel Aviv	David Blatt	6 (4th)
Hapoel Tel Aviv	Erez Edelstein	4 (2nd)

== Regular season ==
	Team	Pld	W	L	PF	PA	Diff	Pts	Playoff
1.	Maccabi Tel Aviv	28	22	6	2275	2089	+186	50	Upper Playoffs
2.	Hapoel Jerusalem	28	21	7	2328	2162	+166	49	Upper Playoffs
3.	Maccabi Haifa	28	18	10	2290	2167	+123	46	Upper Playoffs
4.	Hapoel Tel Aviv	28	15	13	2202	2206	-4	43	Upper Playoffs
5.	Hapoel Eilat	29	18	11	2308	2261	+47	47	Lower Playoffs
6.	Ironi Nes Ziona	29	16	13	2344	2295	+49	45	Lower Playoffs
7.	Hapoel Holon	29	15	14	2290	2206	+84	44	Lower Playoffs
8.	Hapoel Gilboa Galil	29	14	15	2187	2205	-18	43	Lower Playoffs
9.	Barak Netanya	29	9	20	2140	2352	-212	38	Lower Playoffs
10.	Maccabi Rishon LeZion	29	9	20	2153	2314	-161	38	Lower Playoffs
11.	Bnei Herzliya	29	8	21	2296	2366	-70	37	Lower Playoffs
12.	Maccabi Ashdod	29	7	22	2214	2404	-190	36	Lower Playoffs

Qualification to Upper Playoffs
Qualification to Quarterfinals
Relegation to the Second Division due to financial problems

Pld – Played; W – Won; L – Lost; PF – Points for; PA – Points against; Diff – Difference; Pts – Points.

== Bracket ==
The Finals series was played in a home-and-away format, with the overall cumulative score determining the champion.

Quarter-Finals
1	Maccabi Tel Aviv	3
8	Hapoel Gilboa Galil	1
4	Hapoel Tel Aviv	1
5	Hapoel Eilat	3
2	Hapoel Jerusalem	3
7	Hapoel Holon	1
3	Maccabi Haifa	3
6	Ironi Nes Ziona	2

Semi-Finals
1	Maccabi Tel Aviv	3
5	Hapoel Eilat	1
2	Hapoel Jerusalem	1
3	Maccabi Haifa	3

Final
1	Maccabi Tel Aviv	163
3	Maccabi Haifa	161

== Quarterfinals ==
The Quarterfinals are played as The-Best-Of-5 series. The higher ranked team hosts games 1, 3 and 5 (if necessary). The lower ranked team hosts games 2 and 4 (if necessary).

Team #1	Agg.	Team #2	Game 1 1–3 May	Game 2 7–8 May	Game 3 10–12 May	Game 4 12–15 May	Game 5 19 May
Maccabi Tel Aviv (1)	3-1	(8) Hapoel Gilboa Galil	99-93	71-75	93-67	94-65	
Hapoel Jerusalem (2)	3-1	(7) Hapoel Holon	89-83	75-79	85-79	75-74	
Maccabi Haifa (3)	3-2	(6) Ironi Nes Ziona	78-67	59-79	88-71	65-92	68-67 (OT)
Hapoel Tel Aviv (4)	1-3	(5) Hapoel Eilat	82-98	68-87	98-77	83-73	

== Semifinals ==
The Semifinals are played as The-Best-Of-5 series. The higher ranked team hosts games 1, 3 and 5 (if necessary). The lower ranked team hosts games 2 and 4 (if necessary).

Team #1	Agg.	Team #2	Game 1 22 May	Game 2 25 May	Game 3 29 May	Game 4 1 June	Game 5 5 June
Maccabi Tel Aviv (1)	3-1	(5) Hapoel Eilat	90-72	71-81	97-75	100-96 (OT)	
Hapoel Jerusalem (2)	1-3	(3) Maccabi Haifa	79-107	70-82	70-63	68-90	

== Finals ==
The Finals series is played in a home-and-away format, with the overall cumulative score determining the champion. Thus, the score of one single game can be tied. The team who finishes at a higher place in the regular season will host the second game.

Team #1	Agg.	Team #2	1st leg	2nd leg
Maccabi Haifa (3)	161–163	(1) Maccabi Tel Aviv	77–81	84–82

=== Game 1 ===
8 June 2014
20:45

Box score

Maccabi Haifa	77–81	Maccabi Tel Aviv
Scoring by quarter: 19-27, 18-20, 25-22, 15-12
Pts: Smith 29; Rebs: Smith 8 Asts: Smith 8		Pts: Rice 30; Rebs: Smith, Tyus 5 Asts: Rice 7

Romema Arena, Haifa
Attendance: 5,000

=== Game 2 ===
11 June 2014
20:45

Box score

Maccabi Tel Aviv	82–84 (OT)	Maccabi Haifa
Scoring by quarter: 18 - 17, 20 - 20, 15 - 22, 22 - 20, Overtime: 7 - 5
Pts: Hickman 22; Rebs: Tyus 9 Asts: Hickman, Rice 4		Pts: Smith 29; Rebs: Smith 13; Asts: Smith 6

Nokia Arena, Tel Aviv
Attendance: 11,700

2014 Israeli Basketball Super League Champions

Maccabi Tel Aviv
51st title

== Average home attendances ==
Pos	Team	GP	Total	Average	Capacity	%
1	Maccabi Tel Aviv	19	122,300	6,436	209,000	.585
2	Maccabi Haifa	20	61,100	3,055	100,000	.611
3	Hapoel Jerusalem	17	40,450	2,379	42,500	.952
4	Hapoel Holon	17	32,500	1,911	42,500	.765
5	Maccabi Rishon LeZion	14	19,570	1,397	30,800	.635
6	Hapoel Tel Aviv	15	20,050	1,336	21,000	.955
7	Ironi Nes Ziona	17	20,150	1,185	22,100	.912
8	Bnei Herzliya	14	16,150	1,153	21,000	.769
9	Hapoel Gilboa Galil	17	17,200	1,011	35,700	.482
10	Hapoel Eilat B.C.	19	16,800	884	22,800	.737
11	Maccabi Ashdod	14	9,850	703	28,000	.352
12	Barak Netanya	14	8,080	577	14,000	.577

== Individual statistics ==
=== Rating ===
Rank	Name	Team	Games	PIR
1.	(Venezuela) Donta Smith	Maccabi Haifa	28	25.5
2.	(United States) Diamon Simpson	Ironi Nes Ziona	22	22.8
3.	(United States) Tyler Honeycutt	Ironi Nes Ziona	24	22.1

=== Points ===
Rank	Name	Team	Games	PPG
1.	(United States) Carlon Brown	Hapoel Tel Aviv	28	19.6
2.	(United States) Dawan Robinson	Barak Netanya	24	19.3
3.	(Israel) Raviv Limonad	Hapoel Tel Aviv	23	18.8

=== Rebounds ===
Rank	Name	Team	Games	RPG
1.	(United States) Marcus Dove	Maccabi Ashdod	29	9.5
2.	(United States) Tyler Honeycutt	Ironi Nes Ziona	24	9.3
3.	(United States) Rashaun Freeman	Barak Netanya	29	8.8

=== Assists ===
Rank	Name	Team	Games	APG
1.	(Israel) Meir Tapiro	Ironi Nes Ziona	29	6.6
2.	(Venezuela) Donta Smith	Maccabi Haifa	28	6.2
3.	(United States) Derwin Kitchen	Hapoel Jerusalem	27	5.9

== All-Star Game ==
The 2014 Israeli League All-star event was held on February 25, 2014, at the Conch Arena, Beer-Sheva.

Israeli All-Stars
Pos	Player	Team
Starters
G	(Israel) Meir Tapiro	Ironi Nes Ziona
G	(Israel) Yotam Halperin	Hapoel Jerusalem
F	(Israel) Guy Pnini	Maccabi Tel Aviv
F	(Israel) Lior Eliyahu	Hapoel Jerusalem
C	(Israel) Ido Kozikaro	Maccabi Haifa
Reserves
G	(Israel) Afik Nissim	Hapoel Eilat
G	(Israel) Shlomi Harush	Hapoel Holon
G	(Israel) Raviv Limonad	Hapoel Tel Aviv
G	(Israel) Ben Reis	Maccabi Haifa
G	(Israel) Nimrod Tishman	Hapoel Gilboa Galil
F	(Israel) Shawn Dawson	Maccabi Rishon LeZion
F	(Israel) Eliran Guetta	Barak Netanya
F	(Israel) Oz Blayzer	Bnei Herzliya
C	(Israel) (United States) Isaac Rosefelt	Hapoel Holon
Head coach: (Israel) Erez Edelstein (Hapoel Tel Aviv)
Head coach: (Israel) Danny Franco (Maccabi Haifa)

International All-Stars
Pos	Player	Team
Starters
G	(United States) Carlon Brown	Hapoel Tel Aviv
F	(United States) Tasmin Mitchell	Maccabi Rishon LeZion
F	(United States) Tyler Honeycutt	Ironi Nes Ziona
F	(United States) (Venezuela) Donta Smith	Maccabi Haifa
C	(United States) Marcus Dove	Maccabi Ashdod
Reserves
G	(United States) Preston Knowles	Ironi Nes Ziona
G	(United States) (Nigeria) Michael Umeh	Bnei Herzliya
F	(United States) Kevin Palmer	Hapoel Eilat
F	(United States) Ronald Dupree	Hapoel Jerusalem
F	(United States) Brian Asbury	Hapoel Holon
F	(United States) Rashaun Freeman	Barak Netanya
C	(United States) Josh Owens	Hapoel Tel Aviv
Head coach: (United States) Brad Greenberg (Hapoel Jerusalem)
Head coach: (Israel) Lior Lubin (Maccabi Ashdod)

February 25, 2014

Report

Israeli All-Stars	103–111	International All-Stars
Scoring by quarter: 27-36, 21-20, 21-26, 34-29
Pts: Eliyahu 25; Rebs: Eliyahu 9		Pts: Knowles 20; Asts: Umeh 7

Conch Arena, Beer-Sheva

=== Three-point shootout ===
Contestants
Pos.	Player	Team	First round	Final round
G	(Israel) (United States) Zack Rosen (W)	Maccabi Ashdod	19	18
G	(United States) Carlon Brown	Hapoel Tel Aviv	19	11
F	(Israel) Guy Pnini	Maccabi Tel Aviv	14	-
F	(Israel) Oz Blayzer	Bnei Herzliya	13	-
G	(Israel) Yotam Halperin	Hapoel Jerusalem	13	-
G	(Israel) Adi Markovitz	Hapoel Be'er Sheva	11	-
G	(Israel) Afik Nissim	Hapoel Eilat	10	-
G	(Israel) Ben Reis	Maccabi Haifa	8	-

=== Slam Dunk Contest ===
Contestants
Pos.	Player	Team
F	(Israel) Itay Segev (W)	Hapoel Holon
F	(United States) Tyler Honeycutt	Ironi Nes Ziona
G	(United States) Carlon Brown	Hapoel Tel Aviv
C	(United States) Josh Owens	Hapoel Tel Aviv

== Awards ==
=== Regular season MVP ===
- (Venezuela) Donta Smith (Maccabi Haifa)

=== All-BSL 1st team ===
- (Israel) Raviv Limonad (Hapoel Tel Aviv)
- (United States) Kevin Palmer (Hapoel Eilat)
- (Venezuela) Donta Smith (Maccabi Haifa)
- (United States) Josh Duncan (Hapoel Jerusalem)
- (Israel) Alex Tyus (Maccabi Tel Aviv)

=== Coach of the season ===
- (Israel) David Blatt (Maccabi Tel Aviv)

=== Co-Rising star ===
- (Israel) Aviram Zelekovits (Bnei Herzliya)
- (Israel) Oz Blayzer (Bnei Herzliya)

=== Best Defender ===
- (United States) Brian Randle (Maccabi Haifa)

=== Most Improved Player ===
- (Israel) Shawn Dawson (Maccabi Rishon LeZion)

=== Sixth Man of the Season ===
- (Israel) David Blu (Maccabi Tel Aviv)

=== Monthly Awards ===
Month	Best player Best coach	Team	Points per game W-L
October	(Israel) Raviv Limonad	Hapoel Tel Aviv	20.3
October	(Israel) Nadav Zilberstein	Ironi Nes Ziona	2-1
November	(Venezuela) Donta Smith	Maccabi Haifa	18.3
November	(Israel) Danny Franco	Maccabi Haifa	4-1
December	(United States) Carlon Brown	Hapoel Tel Aviv	19.4
December	(Israel) Erez Edelstein	Hapoel Tel Aviv	4-0
January	(Israel) Lior Eliyahu	Hapoel Jerusalem	19.5
January	(United States) Brad Greenberg	Hapoel Jerusalem	4-0
February	(United States) Devin Smith	Maccabi Tel Aviv	24
February	(Israel) David Blatt	Maccabi Tel Aviv	3-0
March	(United States) Josh Duncan	Hapoel Jerusalem	15.6
March	(United States) Brad Greenberg	Hapoel Jerusalem	4-1
April	(Venezuela) Donta Smith	Maccabi Haifa	15.3
April	(Israel) David Blatt	Maccabi Tel Aviv	3-0
