= Ezequiel Skverer =

Israeli-Argentine basketball player

Ezequiel Skverer יחזקאל סקוורר
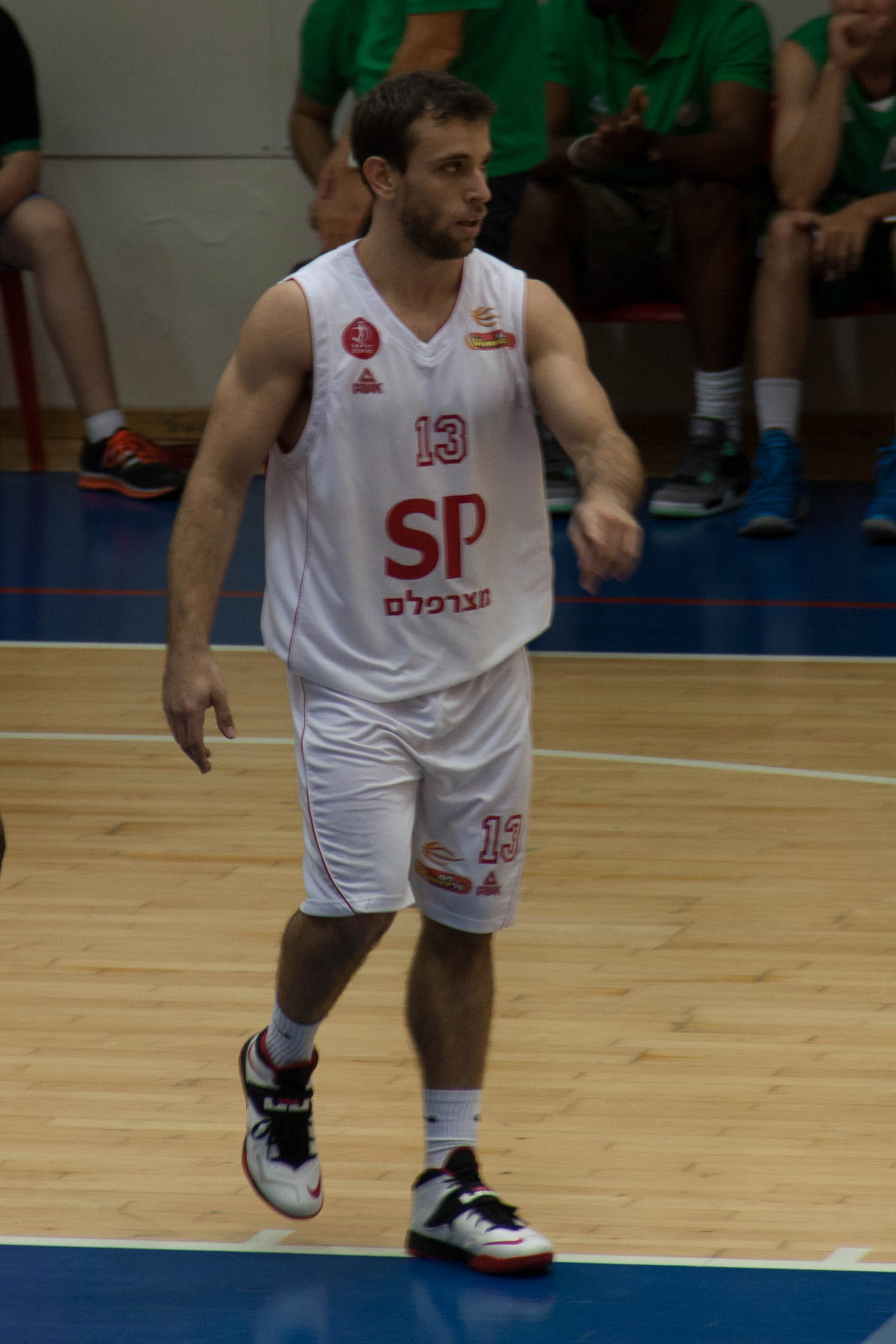
- Skverer with Hapoel Tel Aviv in 2014

Personal information
- Born: February 24, 1989 (age 37) Bahía Blanca, Argentina
- Listed height: 1.80 m (5 ft 11 in)
- Listed weight: 83 kg (183 lb)

Career information
- NBA draft: 2011: undrafted
- Playing career: 2007–2020
- Position: Point guard

Career history
- 2007: Maccabi Tel Aviv
- 2007–2012: Givat Shmuel / Habika
- 2012–2013: Hapoel Eilat
- 2013–2014: Hapoel Holon
- 2014–2015: Hapoel Tel Aviv
- 2015–2016: Ironi Nes Ziona
- 2016–2019: Hapoel Gilboa Galil
- 2019–2020: Hapoel Afula

Career highlights
- Israeli Premier League Rising Star (2012); 2× Israeli Premier League All-Star (2012, 2017); Israeli National League Champion (2011)

Ezequiel Skverer (Hebrew: יחזקאל סקוורר; born February 24, 1989) is an Israeli-Argentine former professional basketball player.

== Early life ==
Skverer is Jewish, he was born in Bahía Blanca, Argentina. Skverer lived his first 4 years in Argentina before growing up in Karmiel, Israel. He played for Ironi Nahariya youth team.

Skverer was later joined Maccabi Tel Aviv youth team and helped them to win the Championship and State Cup titles in 2007.

== Professional career ==
In 2007, Skverer started his professional career with Maccabi Tel Aviv. On December 28, 2007, Skverer parted ways with Maccabi and joined Maccabi Givat Shmuel / Habika of the Liga Leumit.

In his fourth season with Habikaa, Skverer helped them to promote to the Israeli Premier League after they swept Hapoel Tel Aviv 3–0 in the best-of-five series.

In his fifth season with Habikaa, Skverer was named Israeli Young Player of the Month for games played in November and participated in the 2012 Israeli All-Star Game. Skverer finished the season averaging 6.7 points and 3 assists per game and was named Israeli League Rising Star.

On July 4, 2013, Skverer signed a two-year deal with Hapoel Holon.

On July 16, 2014, Skverer signed a two-year deal with Hapoel Tel Aviv, joining his former head coach Oded Kattash.

On June 24, 2015, Skverer signed a two-year deal with Ironi Nes Ziona.

On August 3, 2016, Skverer signed with Hapoel Gilboa Galil for the 2016–17 season. On November 5, 2016, Skverer recorded a career-high 21 points, shooting 8-of-13 from the field, along with 3 rebounds and 2 assists in a 73–75 loss to Maccabi Rishon LeZion. On April 18, 2017, Skverer participated in the 2017 Israeli All-Star Game. Skverer played 32 games for Gilboa Galil and averaged 8.3 points and 3.3 assists per game.

On July 16, 2017, Skverer signed a two-year contract extension with Gilboa Galil. On March 18, 2018, Skverer suffered a knee injury in a match against Hapoel Jerusalem and later was ruled out for the rest of the season.

On July 28, 2019, Skverer signed a 1+1 deal with Hapoel Afula of the Israeli National League.

== Israel national team ==
Skverer was a member of the Israeli U-18 and U-20 national teams.

== See also ==
- List of select Jewish basketball players
