= 2008–09 Israeli Basketball State Cup =

The 2008–09 Israeli Basketball State Cup was the 49th edition of the Israeli Basketball State Cup, organized by the Israel Basketball Association. 26 teams took part in the competition. The semifinals and finals were played at the Nokia Arena in Tel Aviv.

Hapoel Holon defeated Maccabi Haifa 69-68 in the final, Brian Tolbert hitting a three point buzzer beater to win the match. It was Hapoel Holon's 1st Israeli State Cup, after losing 5 finals.

== Preliminary round ==
4 Liga Leumit teams have been drawn to play a preliminary round to earn a spot in the main draw.

| Home team | Score | Away team |
|---|---|---|
| Hapoel Yokneam\Megido | 68–85 | Eliztur Kokhav Ya'ir |
| Hapoel Lev HaSharon | 55–78 | Maccabi Hod HaSharon |

== Main draw ==
Following IBA's rules, the current champions, Hapoel Holon, and the cup holders, Hapoel Jerusalem, have been drawn straight into the quarterfinals, into different halves of the draw. Two other random teams, Maccabi Tel Aviv and Hapoel Afula, have been drawn straight into the second round.

First round
Hapoel Ness Ziona | 75
Ironi Ashkelon | 89
Eliztur Yavne | 98
Elitzur Kiryat Ata | 109
Elitzur Maccabi Netanya | 77
Ironi Ramat Gan | 92
Hapoel Nazareth Illit | 50
Bnei HaSharon | 95
Eliztur Kokhav Ya'ir | 63
Ironi Nahariya | 82
Maccabi Hod HaSharon | 70
Elitzur Ramla | 68
Hapoel Be'eri | 51
Maccabi Haifa | 97
Beitar Binyamina | 76
Hapoel Gilboa Galil Elyon | 107
Hapoel Kiryat Tiv'on | 62
Maccabi Giv'at Shmuel | 86
Maccabi Ashdod | 89
Maccabi Rishon LeZion | 109

Second round
Ironi Ashkelon | 98
Elitzur Kiryat Ata | 91
Hapoel Holon | Bye
Ironi Ramat Gan | 62
Bnei HaSharon | 101
Ironi Nahariya | 99
Maccabi Tel Aviv | 85
Maccabi Hod HaSharon | 87
Hapoel Afula | 91
Maccabi Haifa | 75
Hapoel Gilboa Galil Elyon | 73
Hapoel Jerusalem | Bye
Maccabi Giv'at Shmuel | 98
Maccabi Rishon LeZion | 76

Quarterfinals
Ironi Ashkelon | 74
Hapoel Holon | 88
Bnei HaSharon | 81
Ironi Nahariya | 91
Hapoel Afula | 71
Maccabi Haifa | 85
Hapoel Jerusalem | 110
Maccabi Giv'at Shmuel | 78

Semifinals
Hapoel Holon | 79
Ironi Nahariya | 76
Maccabi Haifa | 67
Hapoel Jerusalem | 66

final
Hapoel Holon | 69
Maccabi Haifa | 68

== Semifinals ==
February 16

| Hapoel Holon | 79–76 | Ironi Nahariya |
Scoring by quarter: 19-15, 22-30, 14-11, 24-20
| Pts: Luis Flores 20; Rebs: Curtis Withers, Uri Kokia 6 Asts: Brian Tolbert 5 | | Pts: Ron Lewis 19; Rebs: Aaron McGhee 9 Asts: Yogev Ohayon 6 |

Nokia Arena, Tel Aviv

February 16

| Maccabi Haifa | 67–66 | Hapoel Jerusalem |
Scoring by quarter: 18-10, 15-25, 15-12, 19-19
| Pts: Brooks Sales 14; Rebs: Brooks Sales 11; Asts: Amit Ben David 6 | | Pts: Travis Watson 17; Rebs: Travis Watson 8 Asts: Yuval Neimi 5 |

Nokia Arena, Tel Aviv

== Final ==
February 19

| Hapoel Holon | 69–68 | Maccabi Haifa |
Scoring by quarter: 18-18, 18-26, 19-7, 14-17
| Pts: Luis Flores 23; Rebs: Deron Washington 4 Asts: Brian Tolbert, Luis Flores 2 | | Pts: BJ McKie 14; Rebs: Brooks Sales 12; Asts: Ronald Ross 3 |

Nokia Arena, Tel Aviv

== See also ==
- Israeli Basketball State Cup
- 2008–09 Israeli Basketball Super League
