= Abdoulaye M'Baye =

Abdoulaye M'Baye may refer to:

- Abdoulaye M'Baye (basketball)
- Abdoulaye M'Baye (footballer)
