= Carlon Brown =

American basketball player (born 1989)

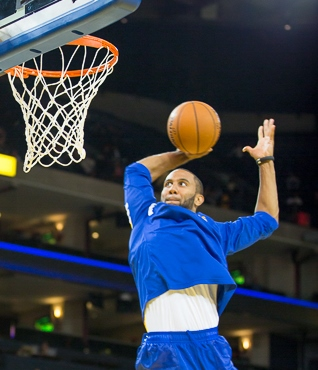
- Brown warms up before a Golden State Warriors preseason game in 2012

Personal information
- Born: October 4, 1989 (age 36) Riverside, California, U.S.
- Listed height: 6 ft 5 in (1.96 m)
- Listed weight: 216 lb (98 kg)

Career information
- High school: Martin Luther King (Riverside, California)
- College: Utah (2007–2010); Colorado (2011–2012)
- NBA draft: 2012: undrafted
- Playing career: 2012–2016
- Position: Point guard / shooting guard

Career history
- 2012–2013: Santa Cruz Warriors
- 2013: Idaho Stampede
- 2013–2014: Hapoel Tel Aviv
- 2014: Brose Bamberg
- 2015–2016: ratiopharm Ulm

Career highlights
- Israeli League Top Scorer (2014); Israeli League All-Star (2014); NBA D-League All-Rookie Third Team (2013); Second-team All-Pac-12 (2012); Pac-12 tournament MOP (2012)

Carlon Michael Brown (born October 4, 1989) is an American former professional basketball player. He played college basketball for Utah and Colorado before playing professionally in Israel and Germany. He was the 2013–14 top scorer in the Israel Basketball Premier League. Standing at 6 ft 5 in (1.96 m), he played at the point guard and shooting guard positions.

== High school ==
Brown attended Martin Luther King High School in Riverside, California. In high school, he was named the Riverside County Player of the Year, he was a two-time All-County Selection and MVP, and he was named Second Team All-State. He also won two Ivy League titles.

== College career ==
Brown played college basketball at the University of Utah with the Utah Utes, and at the University of Colorado, with the Colorado Buffaloes. While at Utah, he was twice named All-Mountain West Conference Honorable Mention, in 2009 and 2010.

In the Pac-12 Conference tournament in 2012, Brown was named the tournament's Most Outstanding Player, as Colorado won the tournament, and advanced to the NCAA Men's Division I Basketball Tournament. He was also named to the All-Pac-12 Second Team in 2012.

== Professional career ==
On September 26, 2012, Brown signed with the NBA's Golden State Warriors. However, he was waived on October 24. On November 8, 2012, Brown joined the NBA D-League's Santa Cruz Warriors, as an affiliate player. On January 2, 2013, he was traded to the Idaho Stampede.

On August 11, 2013, Brown joined the Israeli League club Hapoel Tel Aviv. He led the Israeli League 2013–14 season in scoring, averaging 19.6 points per game (4.6 rebounds and 4.5 assists).

On July 17, 2014, he signed with Brose Baskets of Germany for the 2014–15 season. He played only four games with Bamberg, before he got injured and missed the rest of the season.

On July 16, 2015, Brown signed a one-year contract with ratiopharm Ulm of Germany.

On February 14, 2019, Brown announced his retirement from playing professional basketball.

== Awards and accomplishments ==
=== College ===
- 2x All-Mountain West Conference Honorable Mention: (2009, 2010)
- All-Pac-12 Conference Second Team: (2012)
- Pac-12 Conference tournament All-Tournament Team: (2012)
- Pac-12 Conference tournament Most Outstanding Player: (2012)

=== Pro career ===
- NBA D-League All-Rookie Third Team: (2013)
