= Isaac Rosefelt =

American-Israeli basketball player

Isaac Rosefelt אייזק רוזפלט
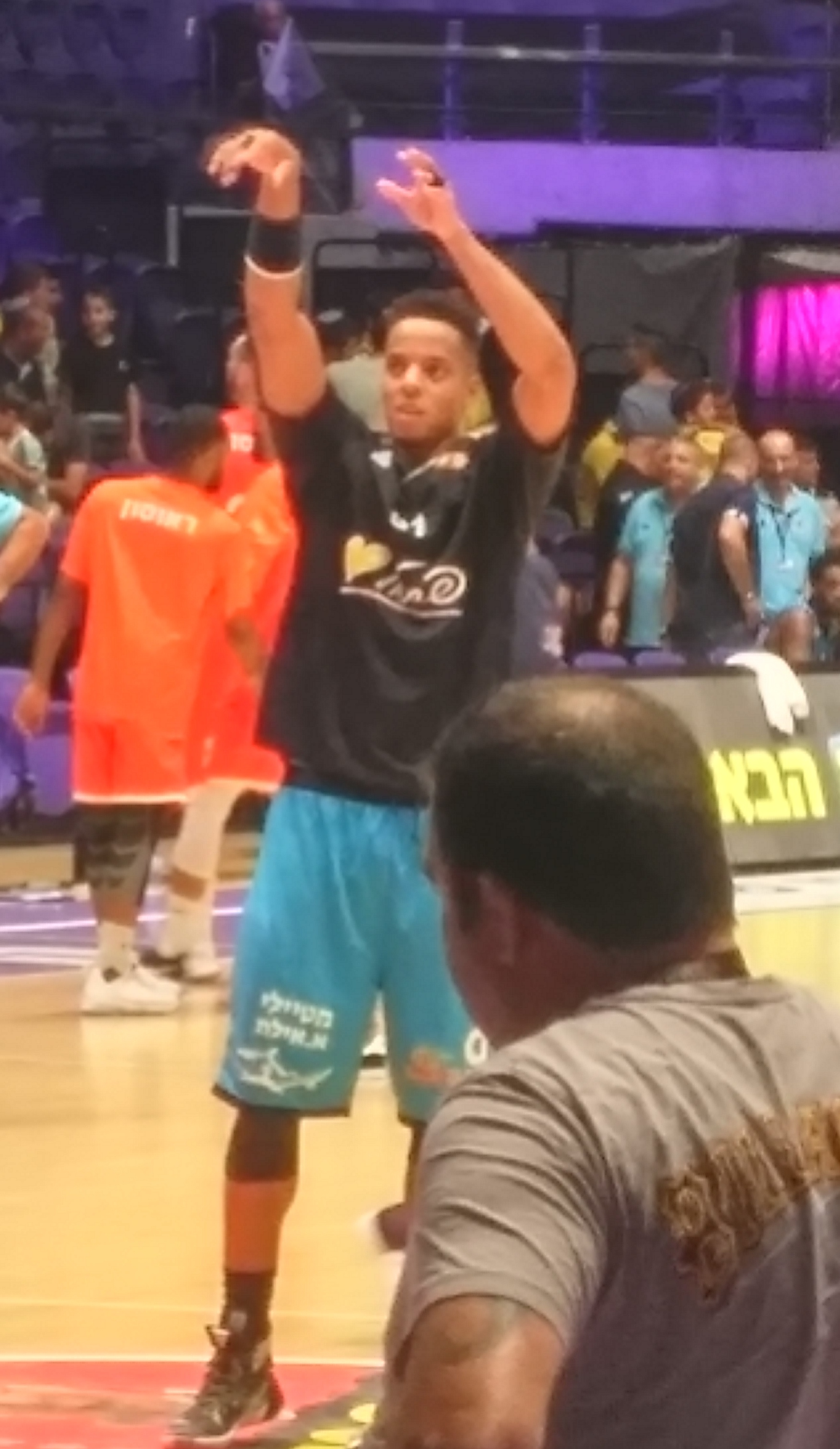
- Rosefelt with Hapoel Eilat in October 2017

Personal information
- Born: May 3, 1985 (age 41) Washington, D.C.
- Listed height: 204 cm (6 ft 8 in)
- Listed weight: 102 kg (225 lb)

Career information
- High school: Saint Thomas Academy (Mendota Heights, Minnesota)
- College: Bowling Green (2003–2004); St. Thomas (MN) (2004–2007)
- NBA draft: 2007: undrafted
- Playing career: 2007–2019
- Position: Power forward / center

Career history
- 2007–2008: Córdoba
- 2008–2009: Académica de Coimbra
- 2009: Denek
- 2009–2010: Bnei Hasharon
- 2010–2011: Ironi Ramat Gan
- 2011: Lev Hasharon
- 2011–2013: Bnei Hasharon
- 2013–2016: Hapoel Holon
- 2016–2017: Hapoel Jerusalem
- 2017–2018: Hapoel Eilat
- 2018–2019: Maccabi Ashdod

Career highlights
- Israeli League champion (2017); Israeli League Cup winner (2016); 4× Israeli League All-Star (2012, 2014–2016)

Isaac Daniel "Ike" Rosefelt (Hebrew: אייזק רוזפלט; born May 3, 1985) is an American-Israeli former professional basketball player. He played college basketball for Bowling Green Falcons and St. Thomas Tommies before playing professionally in Spain, Portugal, France and Israel, where he was named four-time Israeli League All-Star.

== Early life and college career ==
Rosefelt was born on May 3, 1985, in Washington, D.C. He was adopted at the age of two months by a Jewish family and raised in Saint Paul, Minnesota.

Rosefelt attended Saint Thomas Academy in Mendota Heights, Minnesota. He played college basketball for Bowling Green State University's Falcons and University of St. Thomas's Tommies.

In his senior year at St. Thomas, Rosefelt averaged 17.9 points, 10.1 rebounds and 2.4 blocks per game.

Rosefelt was a two-time D3hoops.com All-America selection. On March 21, 2006, Rosefelt was named NABC All-American. On September 17, 2013, Rosefelt was inducted into the University of St. Thomas Athletic Hall of Fame.

== Professional career ==
On July 31, 2007, Rosefelt started his professional career in Spain, signing a one-year deal with Córdoba of the LEB Bronce.

On November 28, 2008, Rosefelt signed with the Portuguese team Académica de Coimbra for the 2008–09 season. However, in March 2009, Rosefelt parted ways with Académica and joined the French team Denek for the rest of the season.

On November 23, 2009, Rosefelt signed with the Israeli team Bnei Hasharon for the 2009–10 season.

On October 5, 2010, Rosefelt signed with Ironi Ramat Gan of the Liga Leumit for the 2010–11 season.

On December 13, 2011, Rosefelt returned to Bnei Hasharon for a second stint, signing for the rest of the season. On April 1, 2012, Rosefelt recorded a career-high 28 points, shooting 11-of-14 from the field, along with 15 rebounds in an 84–81 win over Barak Netanya. He was subsequently named Israeli League Player of the Week. Rosefelt finished the season as the Israeli League second leading player in rebounds (9.2 per game), just behind Bryant Dunston. On June 1, 2012, Rosefelt signed a one-year contract extension with Bnei Hasharon.

On June 30, 2013, Rosefelt signed a two-year deal with Hapoel Holon. On October 13, 2014, Rosefelt recorded 13 points and sets an Israeli Premier League single-game record with 26 rebounds in an 89–72 win over Hapoel Gilboa Galil. On October 31, 2014, Rosefelt was named Israeli League Player of the Month for games played in October.

On July 3, 2016, Rosefelt signed with Hapoel Jerusalem for the 2016–17 season. Roseflet went on to win the 2016 Israeli League Cup and the 2017 Israeli League Championship with Jerusalem.

On July 12, 2017, Rosefelt signed with Hapoel Eilat for the 2017–18 season. On June 5, 2018, Rosefelt recorded a season-high 22 points, shooting 10-of-16 from the field, along with 7 rebounds in an 87–70 win over his former team Hapoel Holon. Rosefelt helped Eilat to reach the 2018 Israeli League Playoffs, where they eventually lost to Hapoel Holon.

On July 18, 2018, Rosefelt signed a one-year deal with Maccabi Ashdod.

On July 17, 2019, Rosefelt signed with Hapoel Haifa of the Israeli National League, joining his former head coach Elad Hasin. On September 9, 2019, Rosefelt parted ways with Hapoel Haifa for personal reasons.

== Career statistics ==
Legend
GP	Games played	MPG	Minutes per game	FG%	Field goal percentage
3P%	3-point field goal percentage	FT%	Free throw percentage	RPG	Rebounds per game
APG	Assists per game	SPG	Steals per game	BPG	Blocks per game
PPG	Points per game	**Bold**	Career high		Led the league

=== Domestic Leagues ===
Season	Team	League	GP	MPG	FG%	3P%	FT%	RPG	APG	SPG	BPG	PPG
2007–08	(Spain) Córdoba	LEB Bronce	9	12.0	50.0%	50.0%	50.0%	3.4	0.3	0.4	1.1	4.0
2008–09	(Portugal) Académica	LPB	6	25.2	45.6%	46.2%	42.9%	7.2	0.3	1.0	1.0	12.7
2009	(France) Denek	NM1	7	28.2	55.7%	0%	58.3%	8.6	1.0	0.2	1.6	10.7
2009–10	(Israel) Bnei Hasharon	IPL	13	7.0	59.1%	50%	40%	1.5	0.4	0.4	0.2	2.9
2010–11	(Israel) Ironi Ramat-Gan	INL	28	31.1	64.5%	20%	62.6%	**12.1**	1.4	1.3	**1.9**	**17.1**
2011	(Israel) Lev Hasharon	INL	10	**31.5**	60.9%	0%	63%	11.4	**2.0**	1.1	1.2	16.3
2011–12	(Israel) Bnei Hasharon	IPL	16	26.5	**67.7%**	0%	65.1%	9.3	0.6	**1.4**	1.0	10.1
2012–13	(Israel) Bnei Hasharon	IPL	25	15.5	62.7%	0%	48.9%	3.6	0.2	0.3	0.6	7.2
2013–14	(Israel) Hapoel Holon	IPL	29	23.8	55.7%	0%	72%	6.5	0.8	0.9	0.6	9.9
2014–15	(Israel) Hapoel Holon	IPL	32	28.6	55.2%	0%	66.9%	9.1	0.7	0.9	0.6	11.4
2015–16	(Israel) Hapoel Holon	IPL	33	28.6	55.8%	0%	69%	7.1	1.1	0.7	0.8	10.8
2016–17	(Israel) Hapoel Jerusalem	IPL	23	11.3	50.8%	**100%**	68%	2.8	0.3	0.4	0.4	3.7
2017–18	(Israel) Hapoel Eilat	IPL	**35**	20.1	54.2%	0%	57.1%	5.8	0.8	0.3	0.5	7.3
2018–19	(Israel) Maccabi Ashdod	IPL	7	25.0	49.0%	0%	**83.3%**	6.0	0.7	0.5	1.0	8.2

Source: Basket.co.il & RealGM.com
