= Marcus Dove =

American basketball player (born 1985)

Personal information
- Born: June 17, 1985 (age 41) Long Beach, California, U.S.
- Listed height: 6 ft 9 in (2.06 m)
- Listed weight: 225 lb (102 kg)

Career information
- High school: Millikan (Long Beach, California)
- College: Oklahoma State (2004–2008)
- NBA draft: 2008: undrafted
- Playing career: 2008–2024
- Position: Center

Career history
- 2008–2009: RBC Pepinster
- 2009–2010: Dakota Wizards
- 2010–2011: Taiwan Mobile Leopard
- 2011–2012: Dakota Wizards
- 2012–2013: Ironi Ashkelon
- 2013–2014: Maccabi Ashdod B.C.
- 2014–2015: Élan Chalon
- 2015–2016: BCM Gravelines-Dunkerque
- 2016–2018: Kyoto Hannaryz
- 2018–2019: Fos Provence Basket
- 2019–2020: Aomori Wat's
- 2020–2021: Bambitious Nara
- 2021–2022: Aisin Areions
- 2022–2024: Tokyo United

Career highlights
- Israeli League Rebounding Leader (2014); 2× Big 12 Defensive Player of the Year (2007, 2008)

Marcus Anthony Dove (born June 17, 1985) is an American professional basketball player. He last played for Tokyo United of the B3 League. In 2020–21, he was the top rebounder in the Israel Basketball Premier League. Between 2016 and 2018 he played for Kyoto Hannaryz in Japan. Dove signed with Fos Provence Basket on August 5, 2018.

== Career statistics ==
Legend
GP	Games played	GS	Games started	MPG	Minutes per game
FG%	Field goal percentage	3P%	3-point field goal percentage	FT%	Free throw percentage
RPG	Rebounds per game	APG	Assists per game	SPG	Steals per game
BPG	Blocks per game	PPG	Points per game	**Bold**	Career high

Year	Team	GP	GS	MPG	FG%	3P%	FT%	RPG	APG	SPG	BPG	PPG
2016–17	Kyoto	55	44	22.9	.590	.000	.626	7.7	1.1	1.8	0.7	12.2
B1 2017–18	Kyoto	46	17	19.3	.482	.000	.453	5.8	1.5	1.4	0.7	5.5
