= Fos Provence Basket =

- Leagues: Élite 2
- Founded: 13 January 1972; 54 years ago
- History: Frat Fosséenne (1972–?); Fos Ouest Provence Basket (?–2014); Provence Basket (2014–present)
- Arena: Complexe sportif Parsemain
- Capacity: 2,000
- Location: Fos-sur-Mer, France
- Team colors: Yellow, Black, Sky Blue
- President: Jean-Pierre Barnes
- Head coach: Rémy Valin
- Championships: 1 LNB Pro B
- Website: fosprovencebasket.com
Home	Away

Fos Provence Basket, also known as Fos-sur-mer, is a French professional basketball team based in Fos-sur-Mer. The team currently plays in the Élite 2, the second tier of professional basketball in France. They play their home games in the Complexe sportif Parsemain, with a capacity of 2,000 people.

== History ==
The club was founded on 13 January 1972 as Frat Fosséenne by its founders Paul Bruyère and Jean Lovato.

On 18 January 2020, Fos received Saint-Quentin Basket-Ball at the Palais des Sports in Marseille and set its attendance record with 3,384 spectators.

On 15 June 2018, Fos Provence promoted to the first-tier LNB Pro A for the first time in history, after defeating Roanne in the finals of the promotion play-offs.

In the 2020–21 season, Provence won the Pro B championship again and was promoted.

== Honours ==
LNB Pro B

- Champions (1): 2020–21
- Promoted (1): 2017–18

LNB Pro B Leaders Cup

- Winners (1): 2021

== Players ==
=== Current roster ===
Note: Flags indicate national team eligibility at FIBA-sanctioned events. Players may hold other non-FIBA nationalities not displayed.

Fos Provence Basket roster
Players
Coaches

Pos.	No.	Nat.	Name	Ht.	Wt.	Age
PG	1	(France)	Crusol, Thimothé	1.92 m (6 ft 4 in)		25 – 5 April 2001
G	7	(France)	Degre, Jordan	1.93 m (6 ft 4 in)		25 – 19 March 2001
G/F	8	(France)	Bouquet, Damien	1.97 m (6 ft 6 in)		32 – 19 June 1994
SF	9	(France)	Galin, Maxime	2.03 m (6 ft 8 in)		24 – 6 September 2002
PF	13	(France)	Aboudou, Jordan	2.01 m (6 ft 7 in)		35 – 30 January 1991
F/C	15	(France)	Ho You Fat, Steeve	2.03 m (6 ft 8 in)		38 – 12 June 1988
F	35	(France)	Wojciechowski, Mathieu	2.03 m (6 ft 8 in)		34 – 20 October 1992
C	95	(France)	Vent, Vincent	2.07 m (6 ft 9 in)		29 – 11 November 1997
C		(Sweden)	Markusson, Mattias	2.17 m (7 ft 1 in)		30 – 10 April 1996
PG		(The Bahamas)	Bridgewater, Dominick

Head coach

- (France) Rémi Giuitta

Assistant coach(es)

- (France) Lionel Soukdeo

Legend

- (C) Team captain
- Injured

- Roster
Updated: January 28, 2024

=== Notable players ===
To appear in this section a player must have either:
- Set a club record or won an individual award as a professional player.
- Played at least one official international match for his senior national team at any time.

- (France) Jordan Aboudou
- (France) Tariq Kirksay
- (France) Abdoulaye M'Baye
- (Finland) Samuel Haanpää
- (Puerto Rico) David Huertas
- (United States) Lee Cummard
- (United States) Marcus Dove
- (United States) Malik Hairston
- (United States) Ron Lewis
- (United States) Robert Turner
- (United States) Jarvis Varnado

== Season by season ==
Season	Tier	League	Pos.	French Cup	Other competitions
2011–12	2	Pro B	5th		
2012–13	2	Pro B	6th		
2013–14	2	Pro B	7th		
2014–15	2	Pro B	13th		
2015–16	2	Pro B	4th		
2016–17	2	Pro B	4th		
2017–18	2	Pro B	4th (Note: Promoted as promotion play-off winners.)		
