= Israel Elimelech =

Israeli basketball player

Israel Elimelech ישראל אלימלך
Personal information
- Born: June 22, 1960 (age 66) Holon, Israel
- Listed height: 6 ft 2 in (1.88 m)
- Position: Point guard

Career highlights
- Israeli Basketball Premier League Quintet (1992)

Israel Elimelech (Hebrew: ישראל אלימלך; born June 22, 1960) is an Israeli former basketball player. He played the point guard position. He was named to the 1992 Israeli Basketball Premier League Quintet.

== Biography ==
Elimelech was born in Holon, Israel. He is 1.88 meters tall.

He played for Hapoel Holon, Hapoel Givatayim, Maccabi Tel Aviv, and Hapoel Eilat. He was named to the 1992 Israeli Basketball Premier League Quintet. Elimelech also played for the Israel national basketball team in the 1977 FIBA Europe Under-16 Championship, 1983 European Championship for Men, 1993 European Championship for Men, and 1995 European Championship for Men.
