= Jordan Aboudou =

French basketball player (born 1991)

Personal information
- Born: 30 January 1991 (age 34) Colombes, France
- Listed height: 6 ft 7 in (2.01 m)
- Listed weight: 209 lb (95 kg)

Career information
- Playing career: 2009–present
- Position: Small forward
- Number: 13

Career history
- 2009–2014: Élan Chalon
- 2014–2016: BCM Gravelines
- 2016–2017: AS Monaco
- 2017–2019: Fos Provence Basket
- 2019–2020: SLUC Nancy
- 2020–2021: Vichy-Clermont
- 2022: DUC
- 2023: Primeiro de Agosto
- 2023–2024: Fos Provence Basket
- 2024–2025: Grindavík

Career highlights
- French League champion (2012); 2× French Cup winner (2011, 2012); 2× French Leaders Cup winner (2012, 2017)

Jordan Aboudou (born 30 January 1991) is a French professional basketball player. He is a 2.01 m (6 ft 7 in) tall small forward.

== Professional career ==
From 2009 to 2014, Aboudou played for Élan Chalon. In the 2011–12 season, he won the national French championship with Chalon.

In June 2014, he signed with BCM Gravelines. Aboudou played for Gravelines for two seasons.

On 8 August 2016, Aboudou signed with AS Monaco Basket for the 2016–17 season.

On 13 December 2017, Aboudou signed with Fos Provence Basket.

On 9 January 2020, SLUC Nancy Basket summonsed Aboudou, and subsequently by mutual agreement on 18 February, the contract was terminated.

On 28 February 2020, Aboudou signed a contract with Vichy-Clermont of the LNB Pro B.

On 3 March 2022, Aboudou was announced to be on the roster of the Senegalese club DUC for the 2022 season of the Basketball Africa League (BAL).

In 2023, Aboudou played for Primeiro de Agosto in the 2022–23 Angolan Basketball League.

On 16 October 2023, he signed with Fos Provence Basket of the Pro B.

In December 2024, Aboudou signed with Grindavík of the Úrvalsdeild karla.

== BAL career statistics ==
Legend
GP	Games played	GS	Games started	MPG	Minutes per game
FG%	Field goal percentage	3P%	3-point field goal percentage	FT%	Free throw percentage
RPG	Rebounds per game	APG	Assists per game	SPG	Steals per game
BPG	Blocks per game	PPG	Points per game	**Bold**	Career high

Year	Team	GP	GS	MPG	FG%	3P%	FT%	RPG	APG	SPG	BPG	PPG
2022	DUC	4	2	15.0	.412	.286	.500	4.5	1.0	0.0	0.2	5.3
Career		4	2	15.0	.412	.286	.500	4.5	1.0	0.0	0.2	5.3
