= Siniša Štemberger =

Croatian basketball player and coach

Zapruđe
- Position: Guard
- League: Prva muška liga

Personal information
- Born: April 23, 1979 (age 47) Rijeka, SR Croatia, SFR Yugoslavia
- Listed height: 6 ft 5 in (1.96 m)

Career information
- Playing career: 1998–present

Career history
- 1998–2004: Kvarner
- 2004–2006: Zadar
- 2006–2008: Široki
- 2008–2009: Split CO
- 2009–2011: Široki
- 2011–2012: Astrum Levice
- 2012–2014: Igokea
- 2014–2016: Kvarner 2010
- 2017–2019: Škrljevo
- 2019–2022: Kvarner 2010
- 2022–present: Zapruđe

Career highlights
- Croatian League champion (2005); 4× Bosnian League champion (2007, 2010, 2011, 2013); 2× Croatian Cup winner (2005, 2006); 3× Bosnian Cup winner (2008, 2011, 2013)

Siniša Štemberger (born April 23, 1979) is a Croatian professional basketball player currently playing for Zapruđe in the Croatian second-tier Prva muška liga. He previously played for and served as an assistant coach for Kvarner 2010.

During his career he played for Croatian and Bosnian clubs with the exception of the Slovak Astrum Levice where he spent the 2011–12 season. He signed with Zapruđe on March 17, 2022.

He holds the record of most scored 3-point shots in ABA League.
