= Derwin Kitchen =

American basketball player (born 1986)

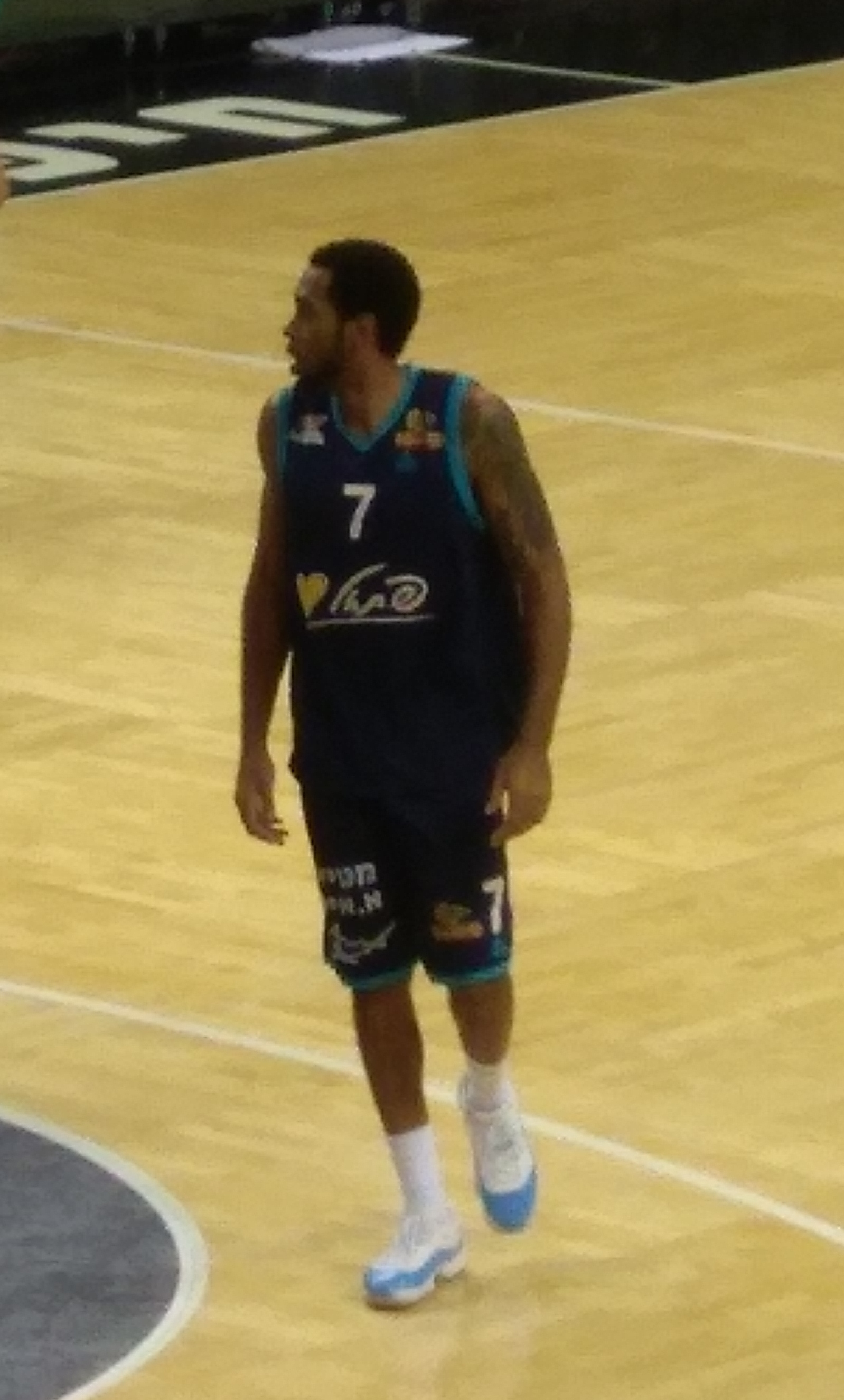
- Kitchen playing for Hapoel Eilat in 2018

Personal information
- Born: May 14, 1986 (age 40) Jacksonville, Florida, U.S.
- Listed height: 6 ft 4 in (1.93 m)
- Listed weight: 205 lb (93 kg)

Career information
- High school: Raines (Jacksonville, Florida)
- College: Iowa Western CC (2007–2008); Florida State (2008–2011)
- NBA draft: 2011: undrafted
- Playing career: 2011–2019
- Position: Point guard / shooting guard

Career history
- 2011–2012: Maccabi Rishon LeZion
- 2012: Panathinaikos
- 2012–2013: → Cedevita
- 2013–2015: Hapoel Jerusalem
- 2015: SLUC Nancy
- 2015–2016: Trabzonspor
- 2016–2017: Ironi Nahariya
- 2017–2018: Hapoel Eilat
- 2019: Defensor Sporting

Career highlights
- Israeli League champion (2015); All-Israeli League First Team (2012)

Derwin Maurice Kitchen (born May 14, 1986) is an American former professional basketball player. He played college basketball for Iowa Western Community College and Florida State University before playing professionally in Israel, Greece, Serbia, France and Turkey. Standing at 6 ft 4 in (1.93 m), he primarily plays at the point guard and shooting guard positions.

== Early life and college career ==
Kitchen graduated from Raines High School, in his hometown of Jacksonville, Florida, in 2005. Afterwards, he considered playing college basketball at several colleges, and initially agreed to play at the University of Florida, with the Florida Gators, but was ruled ineligible for the 2005–06 season due to his academics. He wanted to play college basketball during the 2006–07 season with St. Johns' college basketball team, the St. John's Red Storm, but was again ruled academically ineligible.

During the 2007–08 season, Kitchen played for Iowa Western Community College's college basketball team, where he averaged 14 points, 6.1 rebounds, and 3.3 assists per game. Then, he went on to play with Florida State's team, the Seminoles, for three seasons. He went undrafted at the 2011 NBA draft.

== Professional career ==
=== Maccabi Rishon LeZion (2011–2012) ===
On July 20, 2011, Kitchen started his professional career with the Israeli team Maccabi Rishon LeZion, signing a one-year deal. On January 1, 2012, Kitchen recorded a career-high 35 points, shooting 13-of-17 from the field, along with nine rebounds, and five assists in an 88–77 win over Hapoel Holon. On February 1, 2012, Kitchen was named Israeli League Player of the Month for games played in January.

Kitchen helped Rishon LeZion to reach the Israeli State Cup Finals, where they eventually lost to Maccabi Tel Aviv. In 32 games played during the 2011–12 season, Kitchen averaged 14.9 points, 7.0 rebounds, 3.3 assists, and 1.8 steals per game. On May 17, 2012, Kitchen was named All-Israeli League First Team.

=== Panathinaikos / Cedevita (2012–2013) ===
On July 12, 2012, Kitchen joined the Denver Nuggets for the 2012 NBA Summer League. One month later, Kitchen signed a one-year deal with Panathinaikos of the Greek League and the EuroLeague. However, on December 24, 2012, Kitchen was loaned to KK Cedevita for the rest of the season.

=== Hapoel Jerusalem (2013–2015) ===
On August 8, 2013, Kitchen returned to Israel for a second stint, signing a one-year deal with Hapoel Jerusalem. On June 23, 2014, Kitchen signed a two-year contract extension with Jerusalem. Kitchen helped Jerusalem to win the 2015 Israeli League Championship.

=== Nancy / Trabzonspor (2015–2016) ===
On November 20, 2015, Kitchen signed with the French team SLUC Nancy for the 2015–16 season. However, on December 28, 2015, Kitchen parted ways with Nancy after appearing in seven games and signed with the Turkish team Trabzonspor for the rest of the season.

=== Ironi Nahariya (2016–2017) ===
On November 2, 2016, Kitchen returned to Israel for a third stint, signing a one-year deal with Ironi Nahariya. On February 8, 2017, Kitchen recorded a season-high 23 points, shooting 10-of-14 from the field along with eight rebounds, eight assists and three steals in a 96–75 win over Gaziantep.

Kitchen finished the season as the Israeli League third leading player in assists (5.8 per game) and helped Nahariya to reach the 2017 FIBA Europe Cup Quarterfinals and the 2017 Israeli League Quarterfinals.

=== Hapoel Eilat (2017–2018) ===
On November 24, 2017, Kitchen signed with Hapoel Eilat for the 2017–18 season. Kitchen helped Eilat to reach the 2018 Israeli League Playoffs, where they eventually lost to Hapoel Holon.

== Personal life ==
Kitchen's first cousin and best friend is Jamon Gordon.

== Career statistics ==
Legend
GP	Games played	MPG	Minutes per game	FG%	Field goal percentage
3P%	3-point field goal percentage	FT%	Free throw percentage	RPG	Rebounds per game
APG	Assists per game	SPG	Steals per game	BPG	Blocks per game
PPG	Points per game	**Bold**	Career high		Led the league

=== EuroCup ===
Year	Team	GP	GS	MPG	FG%	3P%	FT%	RPG	APG	SPG	BPG	PPG	PIR
2013–14	(Israel) Hapoel Jerusalem	19	19	31.5	.497	.343	.828	5.3	4.0	1.3	.2	11.4	17.1
2014–15	(Israel) Hapoel Jerusalem	9	9	30.2	.486	.176	.857	5.6	3.6	1.4	.2	10.3	14.0
2015–16	(France) Nancy	5	5	31.6	.404	.250	.789	7.6	4.6	2.4	0	11.4	18.2
2015–16	(Turkey) Trabzonspor	6	6	28.2	.353	.125	.727	7.0	4.5	1.1	0	5.5	11.2
