= Can Altıntığ =

Turkish basketball player (born 1987)

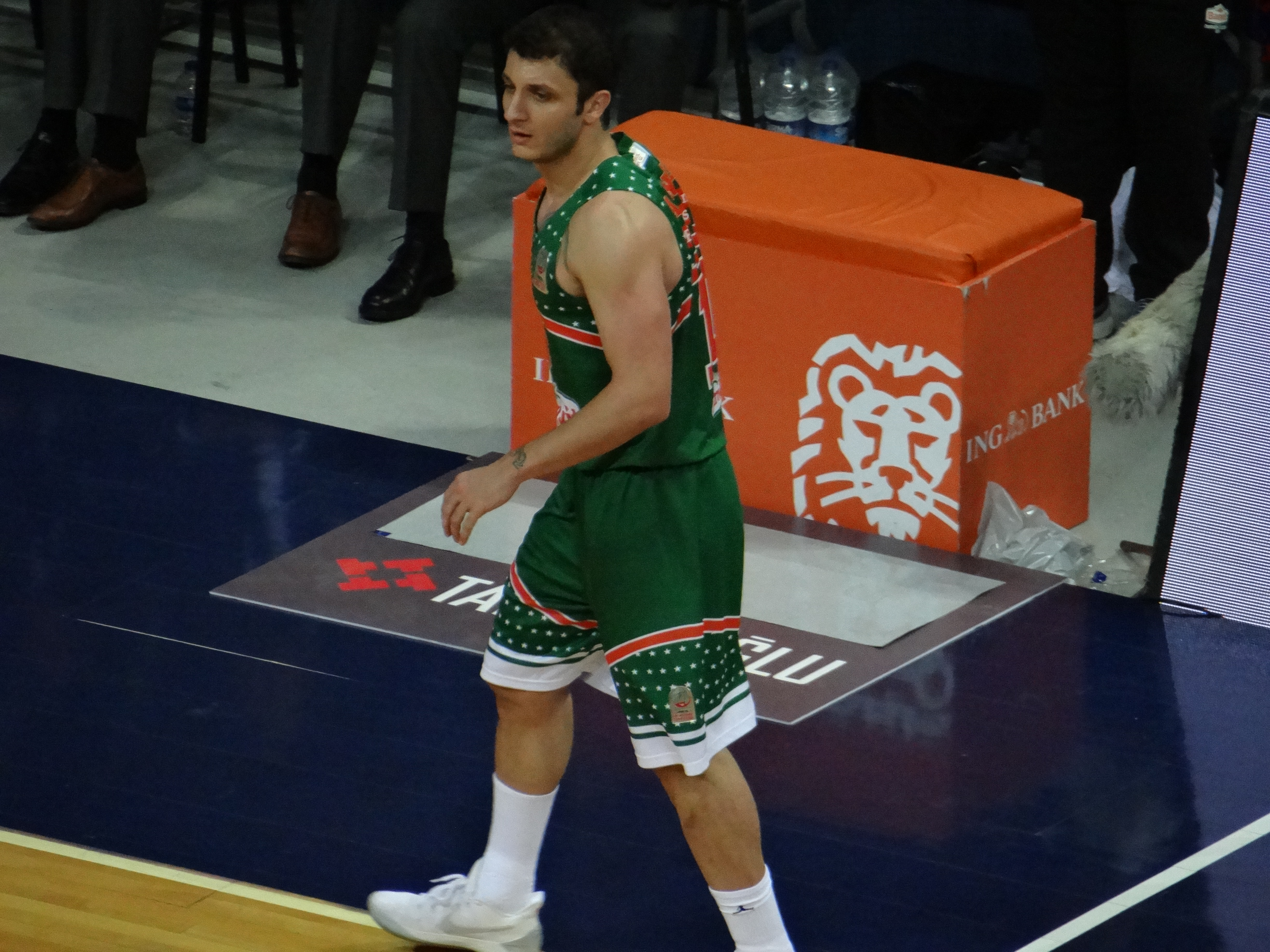
- Can Altıntığ, 2017.

No. 1 – Çayırova Belediyesi
- Position: Shooting guard
- League: TBL

Personal information
- Born: January 1, 1987 (age 39) Bursa, Turkey
- Listed height: 6 ft 4.75 in (1.95 m)
- Listed weight: 204 lb (93 kg)

Career information
- NBA draft: 2009: undrafted
- Playing career: 2005–present

Career history
- 2005–2006: Uludağ University
- 2006–2013: Tofaş
- 2013–2014: Pınar Karşıyaka
- 2014–2015: Fenerbahçe
- 2014–2015: →Trabzonspor
- 2015–2016: Pınar Karşıyaka
- 2016–2017: Bahçeşehir Koleji
- 2017–2018: Banvit B.K.
- 2018–2020: Bahçeşehir Koleji
- 2020–2021: Kocaeli Kağıtspor
- 2021–2022: Semt77 Yalovaspor
- 2022–2023: Konyaspor
- 2023–present: Çayırova Belediyesi

Can Altıntığ (born January 1, 1987) is a Turkish professional basketball player for Çayırova Belediyesi of the TBL.

Altıntığ joined Semt77 Yalovaspor in 2021 and averaged 4.8 points, 3.0 assists and 1.6 rebounds per game.

On January 21, 2022, he signed with Konyaspor.
