= Filip Adamović =

Bosnian basketball player (born 1988)

Filip Adamovic
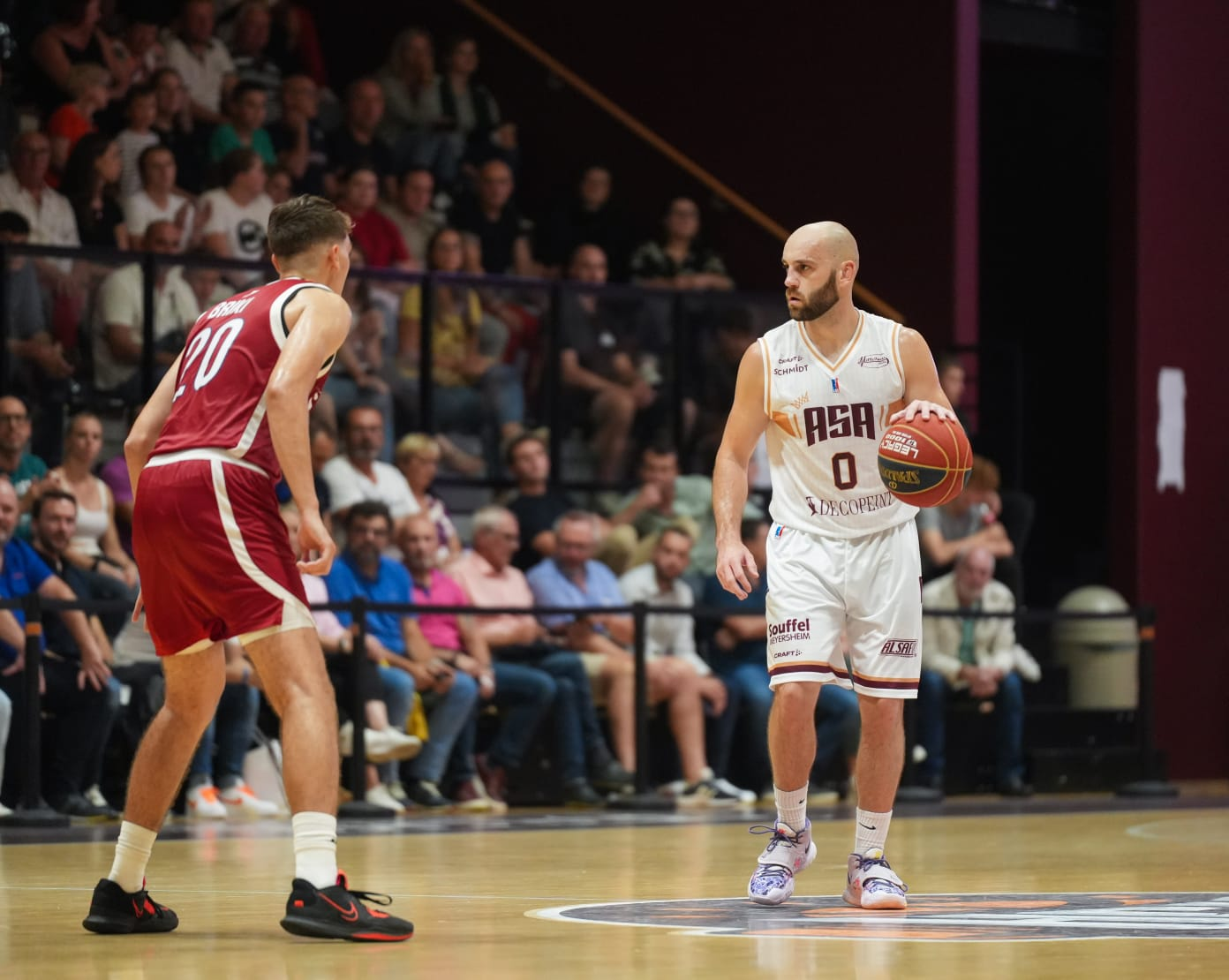
- Filip in 2023 with Alliance Sport Alsace

No. 8 – CSU Sibiu
- Position: Point guard
- League: Liga Națională

Personal information
- Born: 15 December 1988 (age 37) Gradiška, SFR Yugoslavia
- Listed height: 5 ft 11 in (1.80 m)
- Listed weight: 165 lb (75 kg)

Career information
- NBA draft: 2010: undrafted
- Playing career: 2006–present

Career history
- 2006 – 2008: Igokea
- 2008 – 2009: Mladost Mrkonjić Grad
- 2009: Borac Banja Luka
- 2009 – 2010: Sloboda Tuzla
- 2010 – 2011: Servitium Gradiška
- 2011: Borac Banja Luka
- 2011 – 2013: Igokea
- 2013 – 2014: CSU Asesoft Ploiești
- 2014 – 2015: BC Mureș
- 2015 – 2017: U-BT Cluj-Napoca
- 2017 – 2018: Tsmoki-Minsk
- 2018 – 2019: Igokea
- 2019 – 2020: Belfius Mons-Hainaut
- 2021: BC Gries-Oberhoffen
- 2021 – 2023: Rouen Métropole Basket
- 2023 – 2024: Alliance Sport Alsace
- 2024 – present: CSU Sibiu

Career highlights
- Bosnian League champion (2013); Romanian League champion (2014, 2017); 3× Bosnian Cup winner (2007, 2013, 2019); Romanian Cup winner (2016, 2017); Romanian Cup MVP (2016)

Filip Adamovic (born 15 December 1988) is a Serbian/Bosnian professional basketball player for CSU Sibiu of the Liga Națională. He also represents the Bosnia and Herzegovina national team.

== Playing career ==
Adamović started his basketball career in 2006 with his hometown club Igokea. During his professional career Adamović has played in EuroCup for CSU Asesoft Ploieşti and in VTB United League for Tsmoki-Minsk.
