= Abdoulaye M'Baye (basketball) =

French basketball player

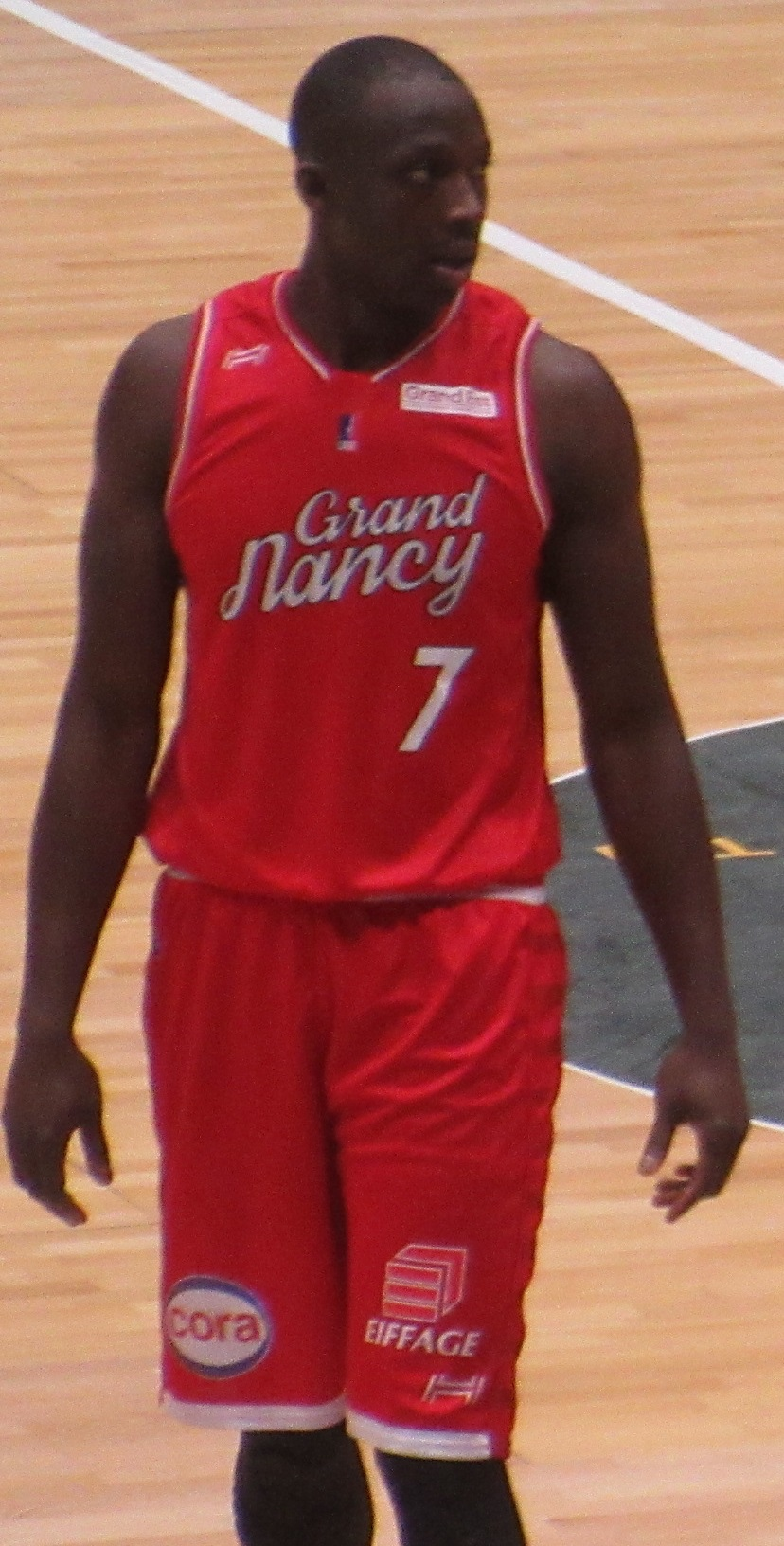
- Abdoulaye M'Baye

Personal information
- Born: November 3, 1988 (age 38) Berck, France
- Listed height: 6 ft 2 in (1.88 m)
- Listed weight: 169 lb (77 kg)

Career information
- College: Centre fédéral (2003–2006)
- Playing career: 2006–2021
- Position: Shooting guard
- Number: 7

Career history
- 2006–2010: JDA Dijon
- 2010–2012: Strasbourg IG
- 2012–2014: BCM Gravelines
- 2012–2014: Rouen Métropole Basket
- 2016-2017: SLUC Nancy Basket
- 2017-2019: Fos Provence Basket
- 2019-2021: Poitiers Basket 86
Medals
Men's basketball
Representing France
U-18 European Championship
Gold medal – first place	2006 Greece	Team

Abdoulaye M'Baye (born November 3, 1988, in Berck, France) is a French former basketball player.

== Honours ==
- Leaders Cup (1): 2013
