= Ron Lewis (basketball) =

American basketball player (born 1984)

No. 12 – SLUC Nancy Basket
- Position: Shooting guard
- League: LNB Pro B

Personal information
- Born: July 27, 1984 (age 42) Chicago, Illinois, U.S.
- Listed height: 6 ft 4 in (1.93 m)
- Listed weight: 195 lb (88 kg)

Career information
- High school: Brookhaven (Columbus, Ohio)
- College: Bowling Green (2002–2004); Ohio State (2005–2007)
- NBA draft: 2007: undrafted
- Playing career: 2007–present

Career history
- 2007–2008: Spotter Leuven
- 2008–2009: Ironi Nahariya
- 2009–2010: ČEZ Basketball Nymburk
- 2010–2011: Dexia Mons-Hainaut
- 2011–2012: Hapoel Holon
- 2012–2013: Antalya BB
- 2013: Brujos de Guayama
- 2013–2014: New Basket Brindisi
- 2014–2015: PMS Torino
- 2015–2016: Rouen Métropole Basket
- 2016–2017: Élan Béarnais Pau-Lacq-Orthez
- 2017–2018: STB Le Havre
- 2018–2019: Fos Provence Basket
- 2019–present: SLUC Nancy Basket

Ronald Lewis (born July 27, 1984) is an American professional basketball player for SLUC Nancy Basket of France's LNB Pro A and formerly for The Ohio State University Buckeyes and the Bowling Green Falcons.

== College career ==
Lewis finished his collegiate career having scored 1,730 points, collected 534 rebounds, and dished out 259 assists. He is an 80 percent career foul shooter and has NBA three point shooting range. He scored a collegiate career high 30 points against North Carolina in 2006. He is notable for his clutch performance in the NCAA Tournament in Round 2 against Xavier. Lewis was undrafted in the 2007 NBA draft.

== Professional career ==
Ron played 14 years in Europe, playing his first season of professional basketball in Belgium for the first division team Spotter Leuven. During the 2007–2008 season he was MVP in the 28th round of the Belgium competition. He was the third-best scorer in the Belgian league's regular season, scoring 17.8 points per game. Lewis played for Ironi Nahariya at the 2008–2009 season, and later signed for ČEZ Basketball Nymburk and Dexia Mons-Hainaut. With Dexia Mons-Hainaut, Ron won the Belgium Cup Tournament. In August 2011 he signed with Hapoel Holon in Israel.

Lewis signed with SLUC Nancy in August 2019.
