= Hapoel Holon B.C. =

Basketball team in Israel

Hapoel Holon
- Leagues: Israeli Basketball Premier League; Champions League
- Founded: 1947; 79 years ago
- History: Hapoel Holon B.C. (1947–present)
- Arena: Holon Toto Hall
- Capacity: 5,500
- Location: Holon, Israel
- Team colors: Purple and Yellow
- CEO: (Israel) Roy Dvora
- President: (Israel) Eitan Lanciano
- Head coach: (Israel) Shmulik Brener
- Team captain: (Israel) Netanel Artzi
- Ownership: (Israel) Shlomo Issac
- Championships: 2 Israeli Championship; 2 Israeli State Cups; 1 Balkan League
- Website: hapoel-holon.co.il
Home	Away

Hapoel Holon Basketball Club (Hebrew: מועדון הכדורסל הפועל חולון, romanized: Mu'adon HaKedursel Hapoal Holon) is a professional basketball club based in Holon, Israel. The team plays in the Israeli Basketball Premier League (the top tier of Israeli basketball), and internationally in the Basketball Champions League. The team was founded in 1947, and plays in the Holon Toto Hall, which is home to 5,500 spectators.

One of Hapoel Holon's most notable title victories came in 2008, as the club pulled one of the biggest upsets in league history by defeating perennial champions Maccabi Tel Aviv in the Premier League final. The club also went on to win the Israeli Basketball State Cup in 2009, defeating Maccabi Haifa, and also in 2018, defeating Maccabi Tel Aviv. Hapoel Holon won its first-ever international title in 2021 in the form of the Balkan International Basketball League, defeating Bulgarian side Academic Plovdiv.

== History ==
Hapoel Holon was founded in 1947. It was one of the founding clubs of the top division in 1954, finishing second in their first season.

Hapoel Holon returned to the top division at the end of the 2006–07 season, after playing for 7 years in the second and third divisions. They finished the 2007–08 regular season at the top of the table. They reached the playoff final, where they defeated Maccabi Tel Aviv 73–72 to claim their first championship, with Malik Dixon scoring the winning shot two seconds prior to the end of the game. Former and future NBA player P. J. Tucker won the MVP title. It was the first time Maccabi Tel Aviv had failed to win the championship in 14 years.

The club has reached the final of the Israeli Basketball State Cup six times, but did not pick up their first prize in that competition until 2009, when Brian Tolbert hit a three-pointer as time expired to give them a 69–68 win over Maccabi Haifa in that year's final.

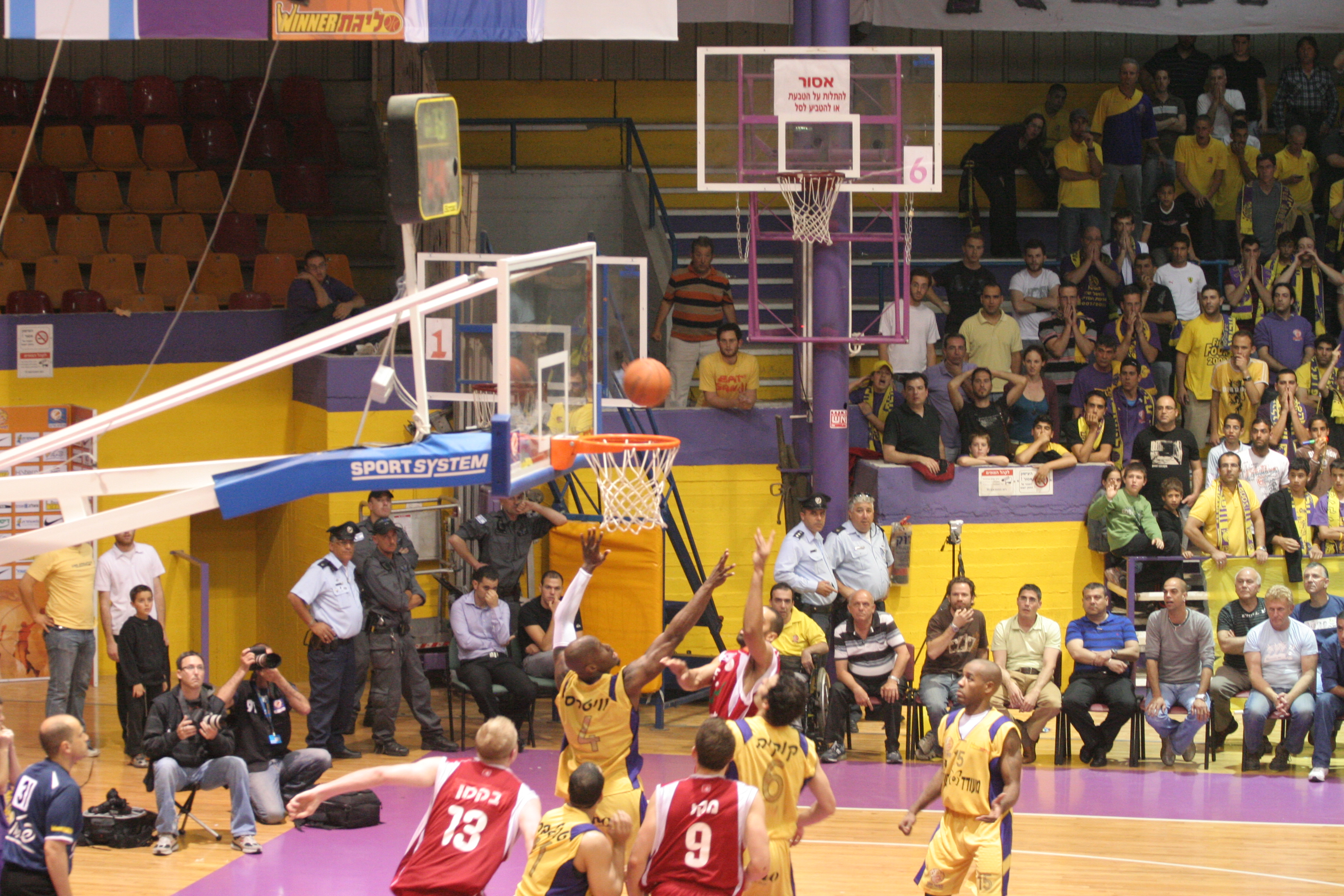
Hapoel Holon's millenial game, at home, in 2010

On January 16, 2010, Hapoel Holon celebrated its 1,000th game in the Ligat HaAl.

In 2018, Hapoel Holon won its second State Cup after beating Maccabi Tel Aviv in the Final, behind MVP and former NBA player Glen Rice Jr.

In 2022, Hapoel Holon won its second Israeli Premier League championship, defeating Hapoel Jerusalem in the semifinals and Bnei Herzliya in the finals, sweeping the series 2-0.

That same year, Hapoel Holon reached the Final Four of the Basketball Champions League for the first time, which was held in Bilbao, Spain. The team, however, was unable to secure a victory in either game, losing to Lenovo Tenerife in the semifinals and to Riesen Ludwigsburg in the third-place playoff.

== Arena ==
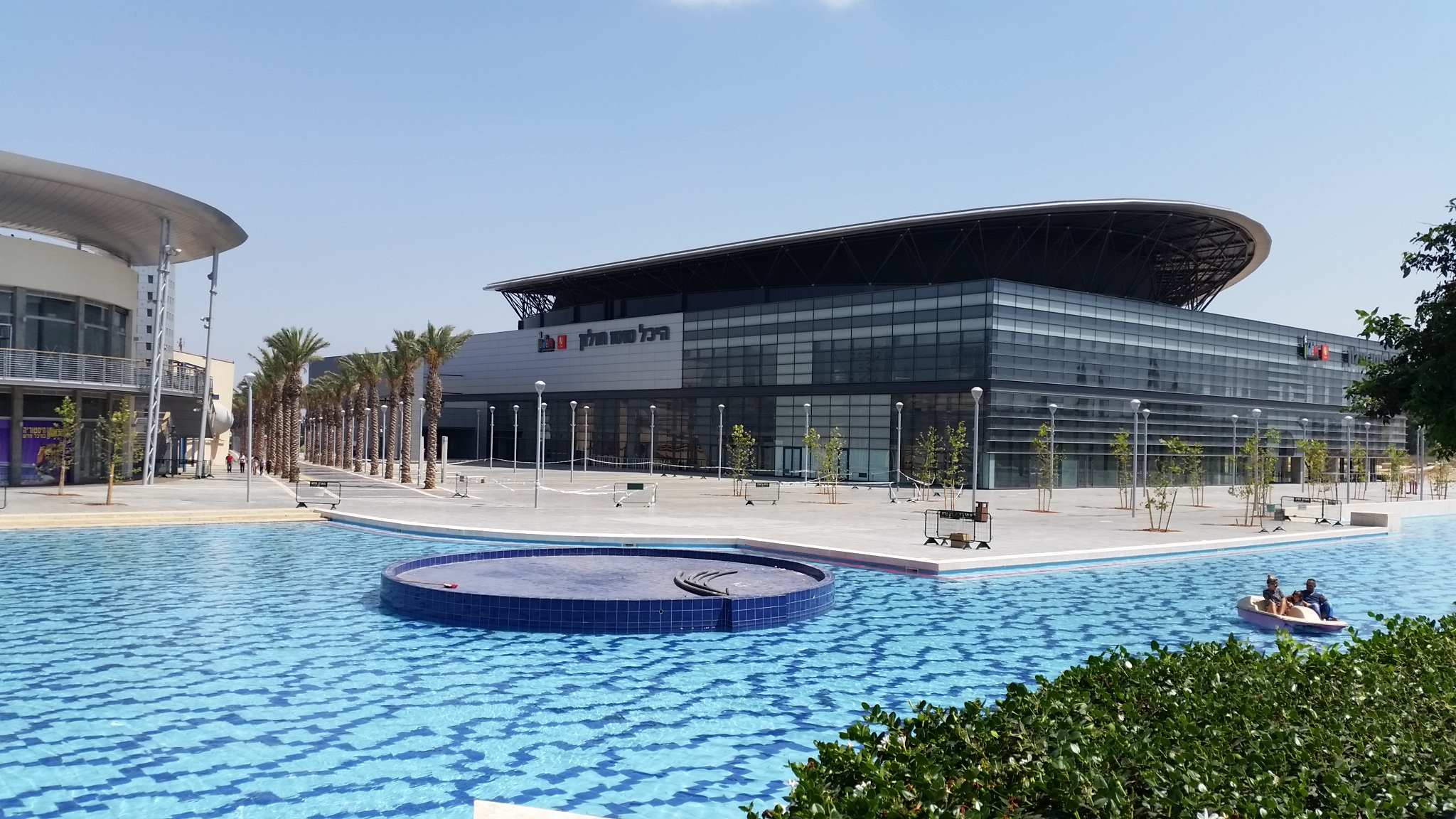
Holon Toto Hall, home arena of the club

Between the years 1953–2015, Hapoel Holon played its home games in the May 1 hall in Holon, Also known as the "tin hall" due to its being made of tin-like irons. It was inaugurated on the 5th Independence Day of the State of Israel, in 1953, in a game against Hapoel Tel Aviv, in which Hapoel Holon won 41:38. The hall was the first in the country to have lighting installed that made it possible to play in the dark.

Due to its low capacity of 2,800 seats, the tin hall was deemed unfit for hosting Israeli basketball premiere league games.

In 2012, A construction began of a new Hall in Park Peres - the Holon Toto Hall, named after Ofer Eshed, an iconic Hapoel Holon player in the past.

Since its completion in 2015, Hapoel Holon plays its home games in the 5,500 seat Holon Toto Hall.

== Honors ==
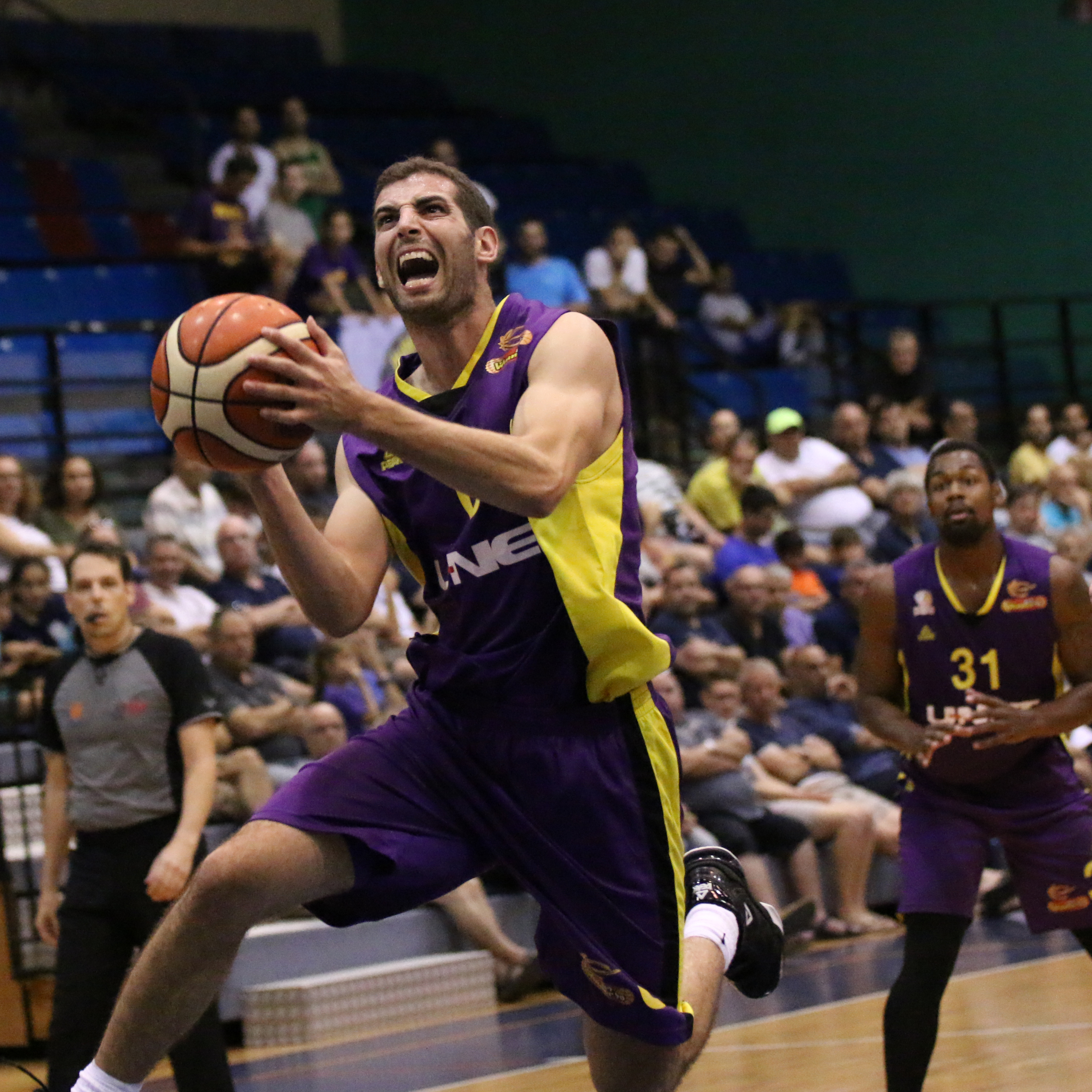
Guni Israeli

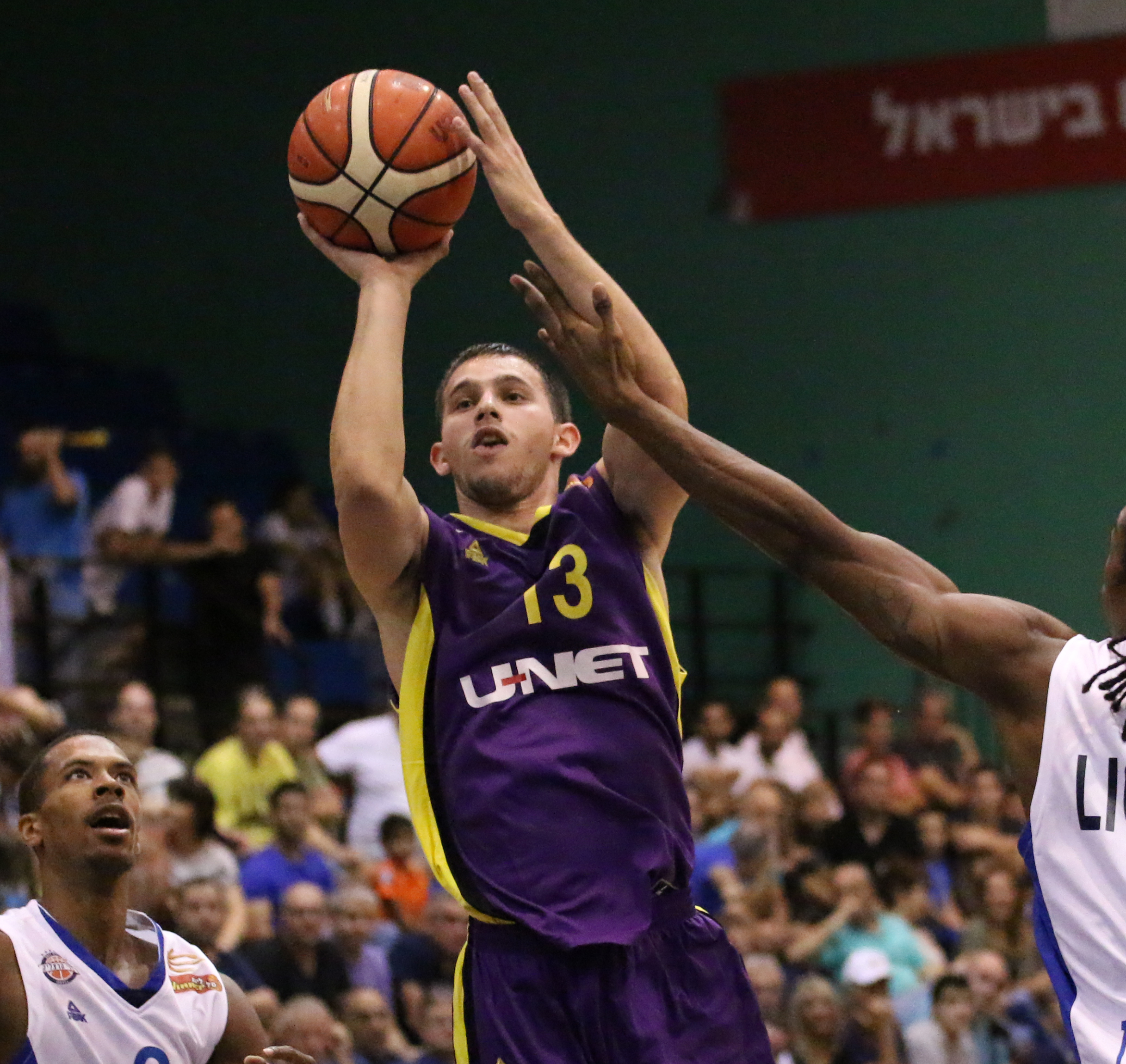
Roi Huber

Total titles: 5

=== Domestic ===
- Israeli Championships

Winners (2): 2008, 2022
Runners-up (3): 1954, 1955, 2018
semi-finals (9): 1983, 1985, 1986, 1988, 1995, 1999, 2008, 2012, 2018

- State Cup

Winners (2): 2009, 2018
Runners-up (5): 1959, 1961, 1986, 1991, 1995

- League Cup

Runner-up (2): 2011, 2020

=== European ===
- Basketball Champions League

Semifinalist (1): 2021–22
Final 8 (1): 2020–21

- FIBA Europe Cup

Semifinalist (1): 2018–19

==== Regional competitions ====
- Balkan League

Winners (1): 2020–21

== Season by season ==
Season	Tier	Division	Pos.	W–L	State Cup	League Cup	European competitions		
2007–08	1	Premier League	1st	22–7	Semifinalist	—			
2008–09	1	Premier League	5th	15–12	Champion	Quarterfinalist			
2009–10	1	Premier League	12th	6–16	Quarterfinalist	Quarterfinalist			
2010–11	1	Premier League	7th	12–19	Round of 16	Quarterfinalist			
2011–12	1	Premier League	5th	17–13	Semifinalist	Runner-up			
2012–13	1	Premier League	9th	12–15	Quarterfinalist	Quarterfinalist	3 EuroChallenge	Top 16	4–8
2013–14	1	Premier League	7th	16–17	Round of 16	Semifinalist			
2014–15	1	Premier League	5th	18–19	Round of 16	Quarterfinalist			
2015–16	1	Premier League	10th	12–21	First round	Quarterfinalist			
2016–17	1	Premier League	5th	23–14	Semifinalist	—			
2017–18	1	Premier League	2nd	26–14	Champion	Quarterfinalist	3 Champions League	Regular season	3–11
2018–19	1	Premier League	3rd	25–12	Semifinalist	Quarterfinalist	3 Champions League	Regular season	7–7
2018–19	1	Premier League	3rd	25–12	Semifinalist	Quarterfinalist	4 FIBA Europe Cup	Semifinalist	2–4
2019–20	1	Premier League	5th	13–18	Quarterfinalist	Quarterfinalist	3 Champions League	Regular season	6–8
2020–21	1	Premier League	3rd	17–7	Semifinalist	Runner-up	3 Champions League	Final Eight	8–5
2020–21	1	Premier League	3rd	17–7	Semifinalist	Runner-up	R Balkan League	Champions	11–0
2021–22	1	Premier League	1st	23–12	Semifinalist	Semifinalist	3 Champions League	4th place	12–7
2022–23	1	Premier League	SF	20–12	Quarterfinalist	Semifinalist	3 Champions League	Round of 16	7–7
2023–24	1	Premier League	QF	16–16	Quarterfinalist	Semifinalist	3 Champions League	Round of 16	9–6
2024–25	1	Premier League	SF	17–16	Quarterfinalist	Semifinalist	3 Champions League	Play-ins	4–5

== Players ==
=== Current roster ===
Note: Flags indicate national team eligibility at FIBA-sanctioned events. Players may hold other non-FIBA nationalities not displayed.

Hapoel Holon roster
Players
Coaches

Pos.	No.	Nat.	Name	Ht.	Age
PG	00	(United States)	Medford, Lester	1.80 m (5 ft 11 in)	33 – 24 May 1993
G	1	(Israel)	Shmuel, Liad	1.84 m (6 ft 0 in)	19 – 14 November 2007
SG	3	(United States)	Harris Jr., Claudell	1.93 m (6 ft 4 in)	24 – 1 October 2002
G/F	4	(United States) (Cape Verde)	Soares, Rivaldo	1.99 m (6 ft 6 in)	26 – 29 November 1999
G	6	(Israel)	Weissbach, Idan	1.83 m (6 ft 0 in)	20 – 25 August 2006
G	8	(United States)	Wicks, Skylar	1.98 m (6 ft 6 in)	26 – 26 May 2000
SF	11	(Israel)	Nevo, Yam	1.99 m (6 ft 6 in)	19 – 23 February 2007
SG	12	(Israel)	Amir, Shahar	1.86 m (6 ft 1 in)	27 – 11 March 1999
G	13	(Israel)	Azoulay, Liran	1.78 m (5 ft 10 in)	23 – 10 October 2003
G/F	14	(Israel)	Ofir, Ori	1.97 m (6 ft 6 in)	20 – 10 September 2006
C	15	(Mali)	Sanogo, Adama	2.06 m (6 ft 9 in)	24 – 12 February 2002
C	17	(Israel)	Shnaps, Itai	2.05 m (6 ft 9 in)	19 – 7 May 2007
SF	21	(Israel)	Artzi, Netanel (C)	1.97 m (6 ft 6 in)	29 – 21 March 1997
F	22	(Israel) (United States)	Iorio, Sam	2.01 m (6 ft 7 in)	28 – 31 August 1998
F	30	(United States)	Johns Jr., Brandon	2.04 m (6 ft 8 in)	26 – 14 December 1999
PF	32	(United States)	Holyfield, T. J.	2.03 m (6 ft 8 in)	31 – 22 September 1995
G	33	(Israel)	Kravitz, Yair	1.93 m (6 ft 4 in)	27 – 3 March 1999

Head coach

- (Bosnia and Herzegovina) Predrag Krunić

Assistant coach(es)

- (Israel) Sagi Shalev
- (Israel) Ofir Farhi

Legend

- (C) Team captain
- Injured

- Roster
Updated: September 30, 2026

=== Depth chart ===
Pos.	Starting 5	Bench 1	Bench 2
C	Adama Sanogo	Greg Lee III	Itai Shnaps
PF	Sam Iorio	Brandon Johns Jr.	T. J. Holyfield
SF	Netanel Artzi	Rivaldo Soares	Yam Nevo; Ori Ofir
SG	Claudell Harris Jr.	Shahar Amir	Idan Weissbach
PG	Yair Kravitz	Andrew Thelwell	Liran Azoulay

- The Israeli League rule requires every team to have at least one Israeli on the court at any time.
- There should be at least 7 Israelis and up to 5 foreigners on a 12-men game sheet.

=== Notable players ===
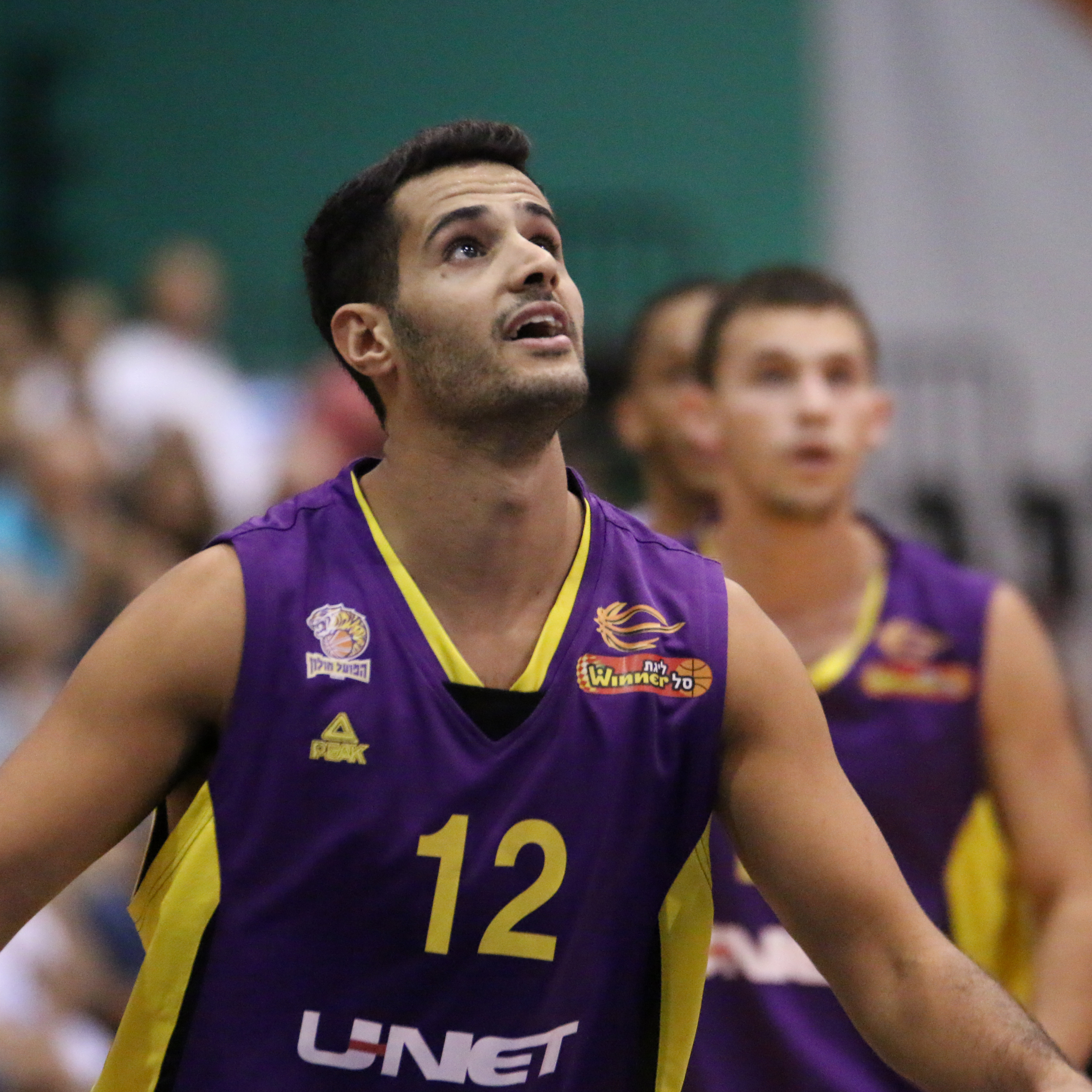
Shlomi Harush

Holon's best homegrown player was Ofer Eshed who played for the club between 1957 and 1972. He is the all-time points leader in the team, with 7,495 points.

Israel Elimelech (nicknamed – The King) is considered to be the club's biggest symbol. He played in Holon during two decades, and led the team to many successful seasons in the Premier League. He played on the legendary home-grown team of Holon in the 1980s, with Niv Boogin (Doctor Boogin), Motti Daniel, Avi Maor, and the Israeli-American player Mike Carter (The Crazy – Meshugah), who was known for driving the fans crazy. Other notable players were: Tzahi Peled, Danny Hadar, Rami Zeig, and from very early days and the contingent of ex Egyptian players: Marcel Hefetz.

The team's 2 titles were won by 2 winning baskets, scored by the 2007–08 PG Malik Dixon, and 2008–09 SG Brian Tolbert. Dixon scored a two-pointer 2 seconds before the end of the championship match against Maccabi Tel-Aviv, leaving Maccabi a 2-second possession which they failed to score in. Tolbert scored a three-point buzzer-beater in the cup final, after he got the ball from an inbound pass by Deron Washington.

Over the years the club has signed several former NBA players, including P. J. Tucker, Ken Bannister, Clarence Kea, Cliff Pondexter, Albert King, Richard Dumas, and Dominic McGuire. John Thomas, who played in the 2009–10 season, is also a former NBA player, with a history in five teams, including the New Jersey Nets and Atlanta Hawks.

Note: Flags indicate national team eligibility at FIBA-sanctioned events. Players may hold other non-FIBA nationalities not displayed.

Criteria

To appear in this section a player must have either:

- Set a club record or won an individual award while at the club
- Played at least one official international match for their national team at any time
- Played at least one official NBA match at any time.

- (Israel) Ofer Eshed 13 seasons: '57–'72
- (Israel) Rami Zeig-Barak 13 seasons: '57–'72
- (Israel) Moti Daniel 9 seasons: '78–'85, '99–'01
- (Israel) Niv Boogin 14 seasons: '78–'91, '95–'96
- Israel Elimelech 16 seasons: '78–'92, '95–'97
- (Israel) Ofer Fleischer 4 seasons: '82–'83, '99–'02
- (United States) (Israel) Mike Carter 5 seasons: '82–'84, '92–'95
- (United States) Clarence Kea 1 season: '84–'85
- (United States) (Israel) Desi Barmore 6 seasons: '84–'90
- (United States) Ken Bannister 1 season: '86–'87
- (United States) (Israel) Joe Dawson 2 seasons: '87–'88, '01–'02
- (United States) Earl Williams 2 seasons: '88–'89, '90–'91
- (United States) Ben McDonald 1 season: '88–'89
- (United States) Richard Dumas 1 season: '90–'91
- (Israel) Kobi Baloul 6 seasons: '90–'94, '99–'01
- (United States) David Henderson 2 seasons: '92–'94
- (United States) Richard Rellford 1 season: '93–'94
- (United States) David Thirdkill 1 season: '94–'95
- (United States) Shelton Jones 2 seasons: '94–'95, '96
- (Israel) Yoav Saffar 4 seasons: '94–'98
- (United States) Milt Wagner 1 season: '95–'96
- (United States) Derrick Hamilton 1 season: '95–'96
- (United States) Joe Wylie 2 seasons: '97–'98, '00–'01
- (United States) Greg Sutton 1 season: '98–'99
- (Israel) Moshe Mizrahi 3 seasons: '98–'01
- (United States) Miles Simon 1 season: 2000
- (United States) Corey Crowder 1 season: '99–'00
- (North Macedonia) Dušan Bocevski 1 season: '99–'00
- (United States) P. J. Tucker 1 season: '07–'08
- (United States) Malik Dixon 1 season: '07–'08
- (United States) Tre Simmons 1 season: '07–'08
- (United States) Eric Campbell 1 season: '07–'08
- (United States) Chris Watson 2 seasons: '07–'09
- (Israel) Moran Roth 3 seasons: '07–'08, '10–'12
- (Israel) Guni Israeli 5 seasons: '07–'08, '13–'17
- (United States) Elton Brown 1 season: '08
- (Dominican Republic) Luis Flores 1 season: '08–'09
- (United States) Deron Washington 1 season: '08–'09
- (United States) Dwayne Mitchell 1 season: '09–'10
- (United States) John Thomas 1 season: '09–'10
- (Serbia) Saša Bratić 1 season: '10
- (United States) Richard Melzer 1 season: '10–'11
- (United States) (Israel) Jamie Arnold 1 season: '10–'11
- (United States) (Armenia) Bryant Dunston 1 season: '11–'12
- (United States) Ron Lewis 1 season: '11–'12
- (Israel) Shlomi Harush 8 seasons: '11–'15, '16–'20
- (United States) Dominic Waters 1 season: '12–'13
- (United States) Jerome Dyson 1 season: '12–'13
- (United States) Frank Hassell 1 season: '12–'13
- (United States) Laurence Bowers 1 season: '13–'14
- (United States) Scottie Reynolds 3 seasons: '13–'14, '16, '19
- (United States) (Israel) Isaac Rosefelt 3 seasons: '13–'16
- (United States) Dominic McGuire 1 season: '14–'15
- (United States) Tony Crocker 1 season: '14–'15
- (United States) Jordan Taylor 2 seasons: '14–'15, '16–'17
- (United States) Will Clyburn 1 season: '15–'16
- (United States) James Bell 1 season: '16–'17
- (United States) Darion Atkins 2 seasons: '16–'17, '18–'19
- (United States) Khalif Wyatt 2 seasons: '16–'17, '18–'19
- (United States) Tu Holloway 1.5 seasons: '16–'18
- (United States) Glen Rice Jr. 1 season: '17–'18
- (United States) TaShawn Thomas 1 season: '17–'18
- (Israel) Tamir Blatt 1 season: '17–'18
- (United States) (Israel) Joe Alexander 2 seasons: '17–'18, '19, '21
- (United States) Corey Walden 2 seasons: '17–'19
- (United States) DeQuan Jones 1 season: '18–'19
- (Israel) Ofer Yaakobi
- (Israel) Chaim Zlotikman

== Colors and mascot ==
The team's colors are yellow and purple after a Jewish American fan of the Los Angeles Lakers donated uniforms in the colors of his favorite club. Before that, the team played in red and white uniforms, like almost every 'Hapoel' team.

For many years Holon's mascot was a tiger. It appeared on the team's logo for many years and in the 1990s the team's logo read 'Hapoel Tigers Holon'. After the team won the 2007–08 National League championship, and upgraded to the first division, the old symbol was changed and redesigned, keeping Holon's symbol, the tiger.
