= Josh Duncan =

American basketball player (born 1986)

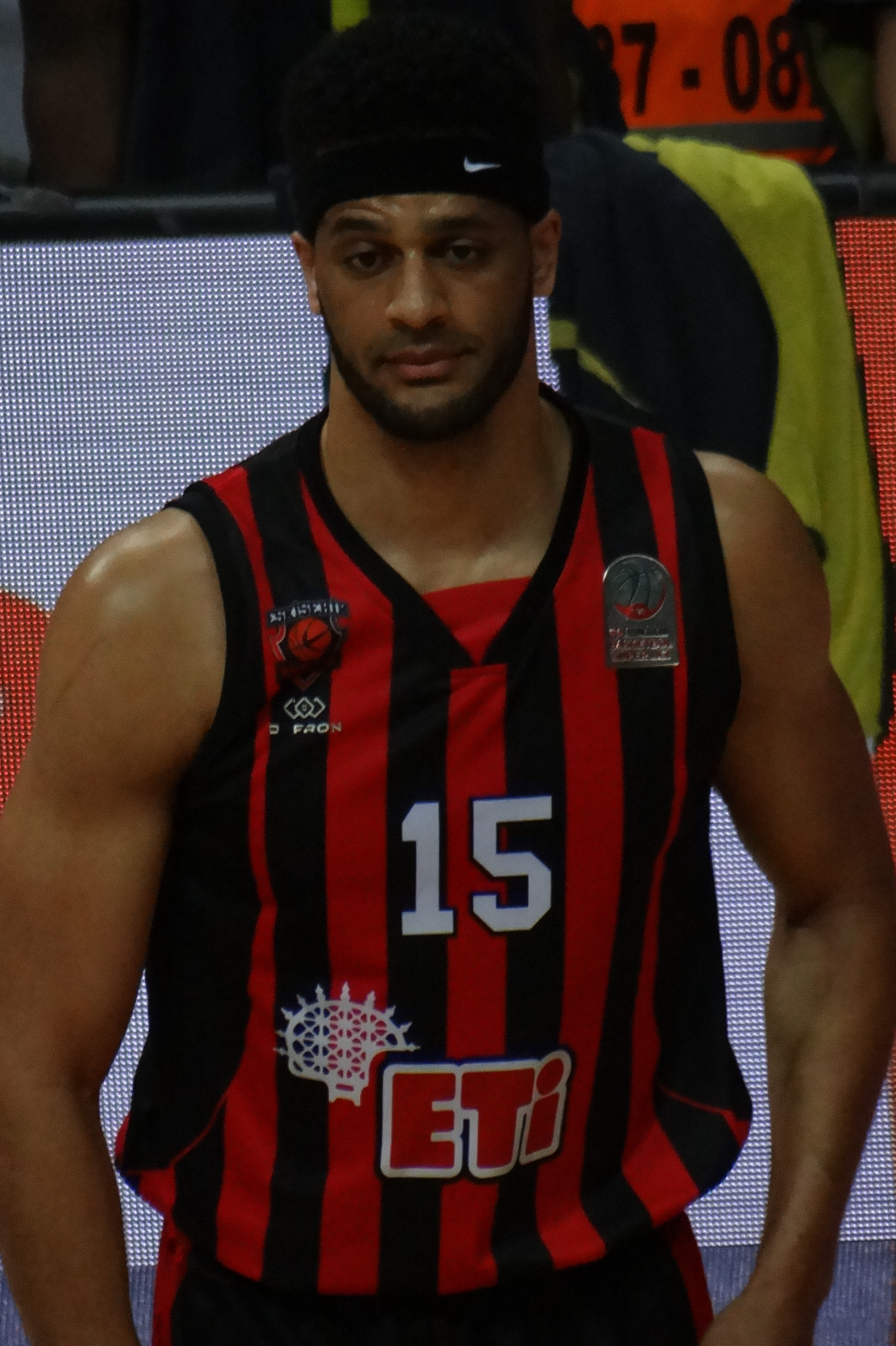

Free agent
- Position: Power forward

Personal information
- Born: May 12, 1986 (age 40) Cincinnati, Ohio, U.S.
- Listed height: 6 ft 8 in (2.03 m)
- Listed weight: 228 lb (103 kg)

Career information
- High school: Moeller (Cincinnati, Ohio)
- College: Xavier (2004–2008)
- NBA draft: 2008: undrafted
- Playing career: 2008–present

Career history
- 2008–2009: Élan Béarnais Pau-Orthez
- 2009–2010: Liège Basket
- 2010–2012: Maccabi Ashdod
- 2012–2014: Hapoel Jerusalem
- 2014–2015: Brose Baskets
- 2015–2016: Hapoel Jerusalem
- 2016–2018: Eskişehir Basket
- 2018-2022: Chiba Jets Funabashi
- 2022-2023: Ryukyu Golden Kings

Career highlights
- Bundesliga champion (2015); Belgian Supercup winner (2009); Israeli Super League All-Star (2012)

Joshua Dwight Duncan (born May 12, 1986) is an American professional basketball player for Ryukyu Golden Kings of the Japanese B.League.

== College career ==
After playing high school basketball at Moeller High School, in Cincinnati, Ohio, Duncan played 4 seasons of college basketball for Xavier University.

== Professional career ==
Duncan went undrafted in the 2008 NBA draft. In July 2008, he signed his first professional contract with Élan Béarnais Pau-Orthez of France.

In July 2009, he signed with Liège Basket of Belgium. With them he won the Belgian Basketball Supercup in 2009.

From 2010 to 2012 Duncan played with Maccabi Ashdod of the Israeli Basketball Super League. In June 2012, he signed with another Israeli team Hapoel Jerusalem.

On July 2, 2014, Duncan signed a two-year deal with the German team Brose Baskets. On July 7, 2015, he left Brose and returned to Hapoel Jerusalem.

On July 4, 2016, Duncan signed with Eskişehir Basket of the Turkish Basketball First League. On July 20, 2017, he re-signed with Eskişehir for one more season.
