= Israeli Basketball Premier League MVP =

Basketball award

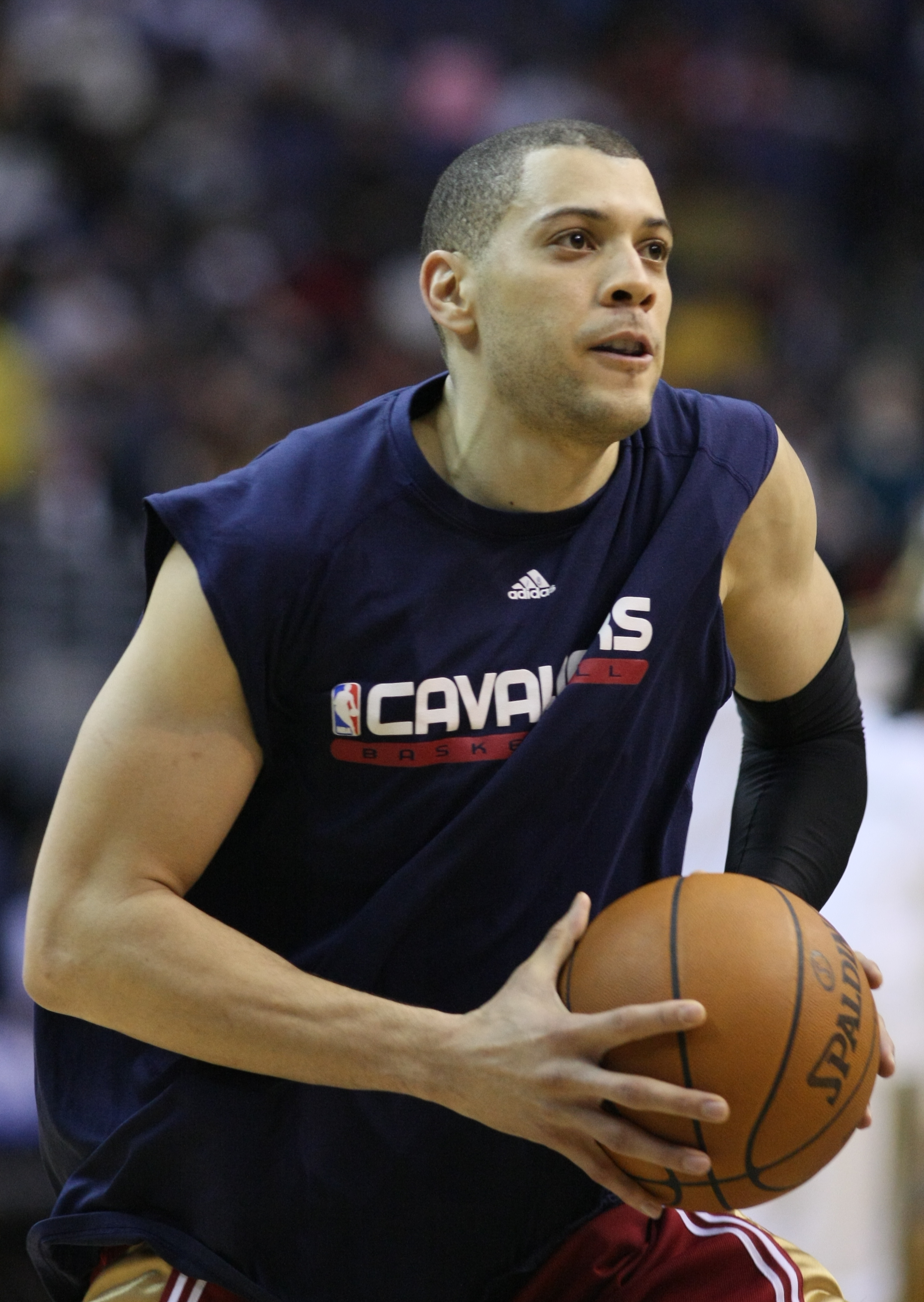
Anthony Parker was the Israeli Premier League MVP in 2004.

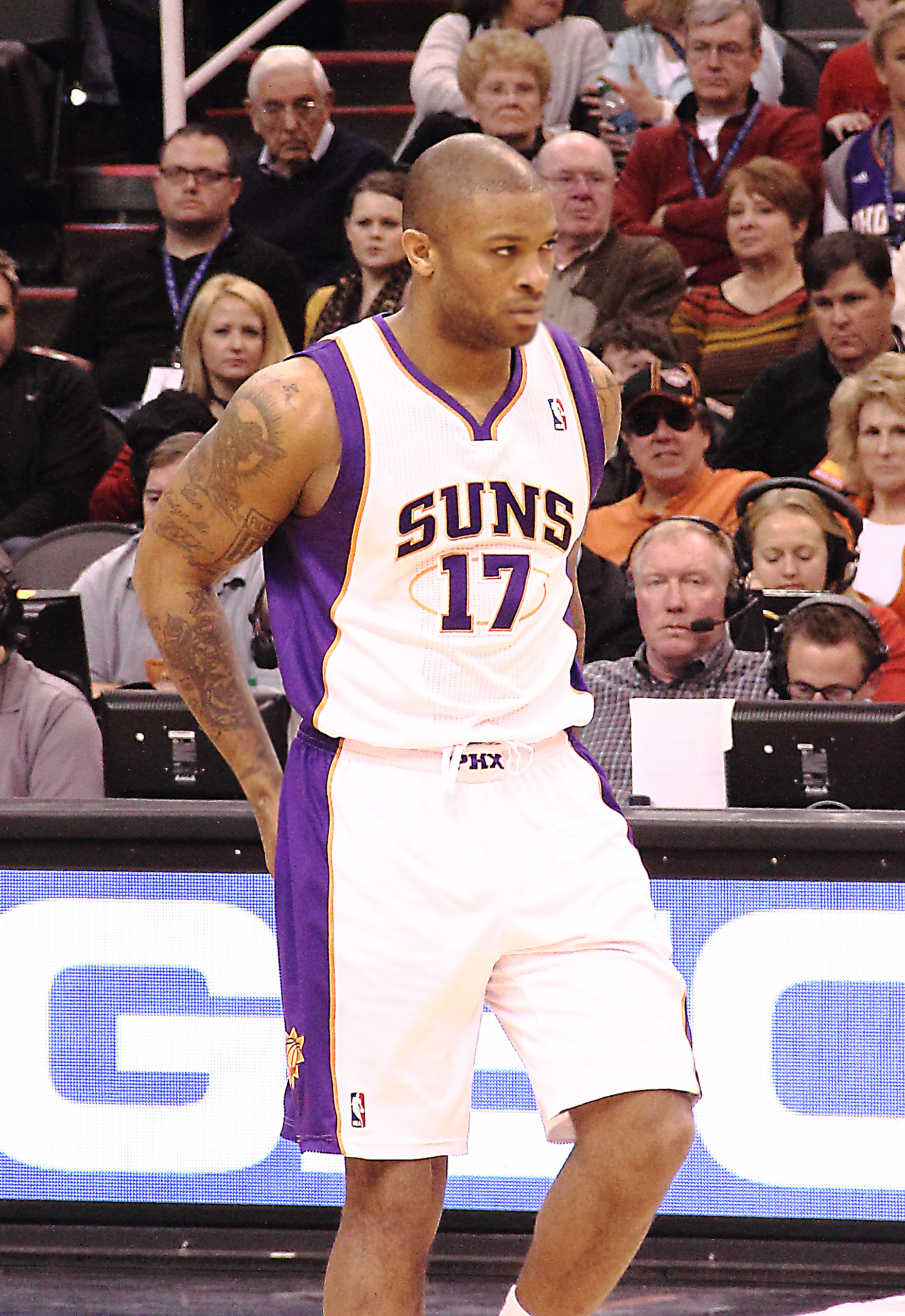
P. J. Tucker was the Israeli Premier League MVP in 2008.

The Israeli Basketball Premier League MVP, or Israeli Basketball Super League MVP, is an annual basketball award that is presented to the most valuable player in a given season of the Israeli Basketball Premier League, which is the top-tier level professional basketball league in Israel.

== Winners ==
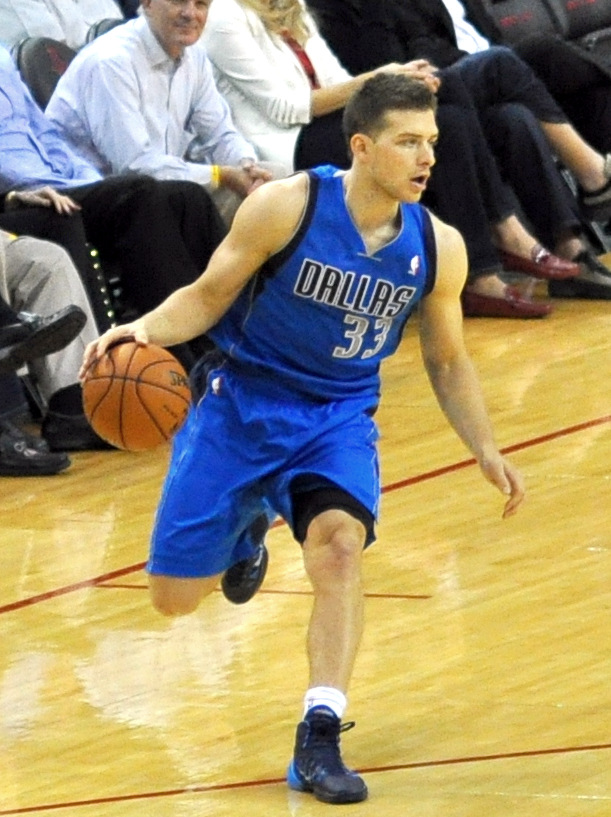
Gal Mekel was a 2-time Israeli Premier League MVP (2011, 2013).

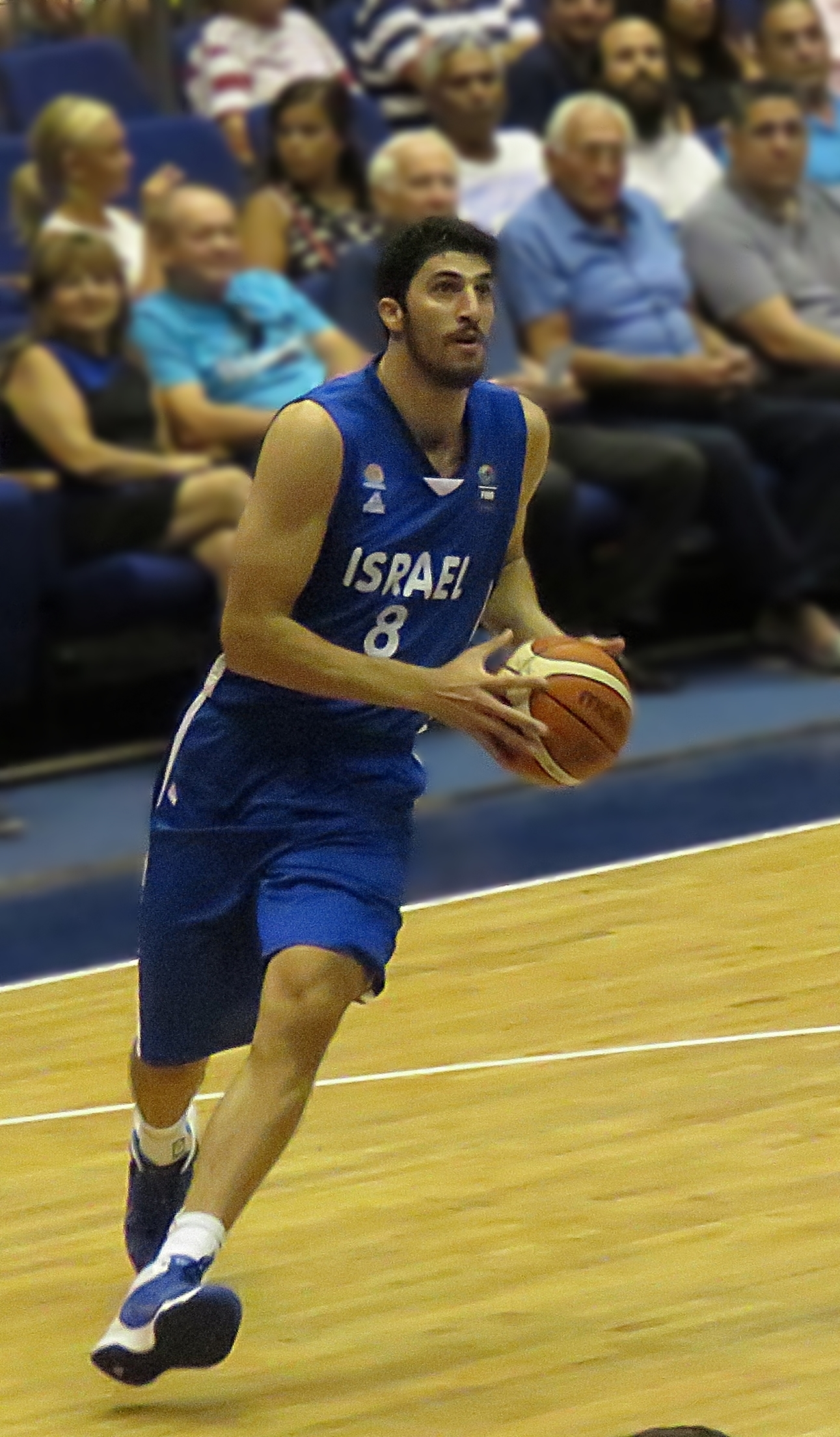
Lior Eliyahu, a 2-time Israeli Premier League MVP (2012, 2015).

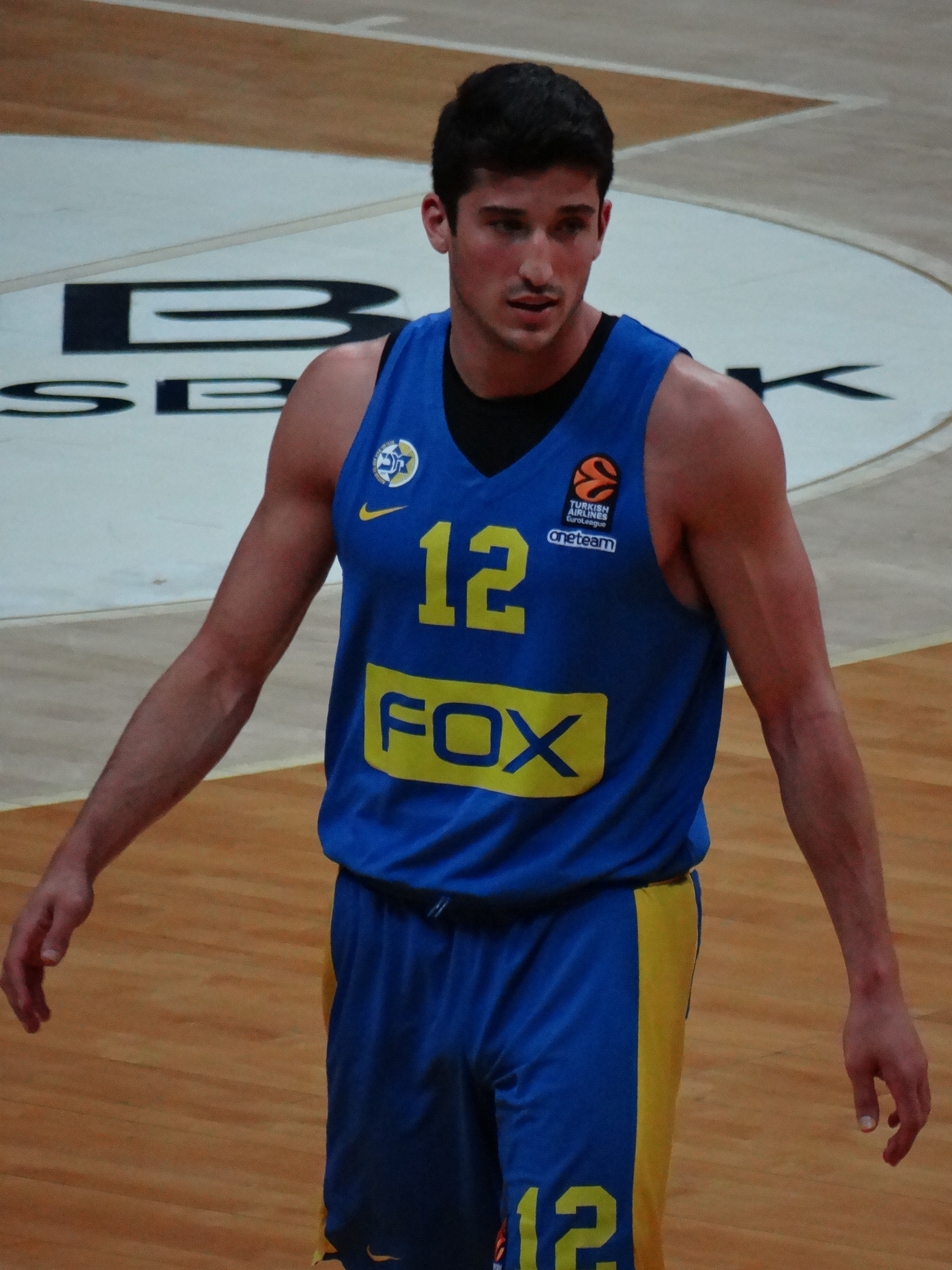
John DiBartolomeo

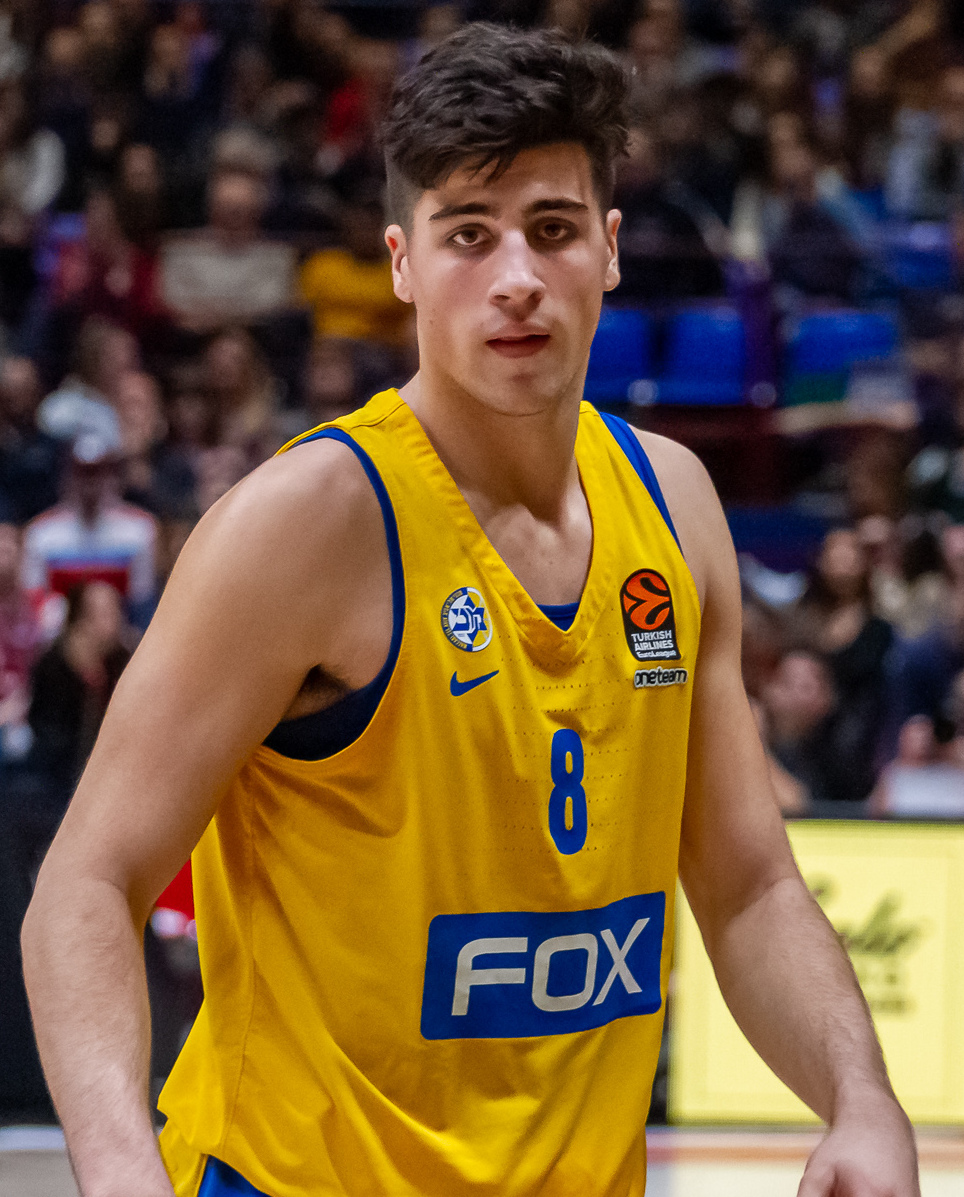
Deni Avdija

Key
Player (X)	Name of the player and number of times they had won the award at that point (if more than one)
	Indicates scoring leader in the same season
	Denotes league champion team in the same season

Israeli Premier League MVP Award Winners
Season	MVP	Position	Team	Ref
1989–90	(United States) (Israel) Brad Leaf	SG	Hapoel Galil Elyon	
1990–91	(United States) David Henderson	SG	Hapoel Tel Aviv	
1991–92	(United States) (Israel) Joe Dawson	SF	Hapoel Eilat	
1992–93	(United States) David Thirdkill	SF	Hapoel Tel Aviv	
1993–94	(United States) Norris Coleman	PF	Hapoel Jerusalem	
1994–95	(United States) Derrick Gervin	SF	Hapoel Gvat/Yagur	
1995–96	(United States) (Jamaica) Andrew Kennedy	SF	Hapoel Galil Elyon	
1996–97	(Israel) Tomer Steinhauer	C	Maccabi Ra'anana	
1997–98	(Israel) Oded Kattash	SG	Maccabi Tel Aviv	
1998–99	(Serbia) Radisav Ćurčić	C	Hapoel Jerusalem	
1999–00	(United States) (Slovenia) Ariel McDonald	PG	Maccabi Tel Aviv	
2000–01	(United States) Nate Huffman	C	Maccabi Tel Aviv	
2001–02	(Israel) Meir Tapiro	PG	Hapoel Jerusalem	
2002–03	(Canada) (Cameroon) Charles Minlend	SF	Maccabi Giv'at Shmuel	
2003–04	(United States) Anthony Parker	SF	Maccabi Tel Aviv	
2004–05	(Lithuania) Šarūnas Jasikevičius	PG	Maccabi Tel Aviv	
2005–06	(United States) Timmy Bowers	PG	Maccabi Giv'at Shmuel	
2006–07	(United States) Lee Nailon	PF	Bnei Hasharon	
2007–08	(United States) P. J. Tucker	SF	Hapoel Holon	
2008–09	(United States) Doron Perkins	PG	Maccabi Haifa	
2009–10	(Israel) Elishay Kadir	PF	Hapoel Gilboa Galil	
2010–11	(Israel) Gal Mekel	PG	Hapoel Gilboa Galil	
2011–12	(Israel) Lior Eliyahu	PF	Maccabi Tel Aviv	
2012–13	(Israel) Gal Mekel (2×)	PG	Maccabi Haifa	
2013–14	(United States) (Venezuela) Donta Smith	SF	Maccabi Haifa	
2014–15	(Israel) Lior Eliyahu (2×)	PF	Hapoel Jerusalem	
2015–16	(United States) Darryl Monroe	F/C	Maccabi Rishon LeZion	
2016–17	(United States) (Israel) John DiBartolomeo	PG	Maccabi Haifa	
2017–18	(United States) (Jamaica) Sek Henry	SG	Maccabi Ashdod	
2018–19	(United States) Corey Walden	SG	Hapoel Holon	
2019–20	(Israel) Deni Avdija	SF	Maccabi Tel Aviv	
2020–21	(United States) Casey Prather	SF	Hapoel Eilat	
2021–22	(United States) Chinanu Onuaku	C	Bnei Herzliya	
2022–23	(United States) Zach Hankins	C	Hapoel Jerusalem	
2023–24	(Israel) Roman Sorkin	C	Maccabi Tel Aviv	
2024–25	(United States) Jared Harper	PG	Hapoel Jerusalem	
2025–26	(United States) Jared Harper (2×)	PG	Hapoel Jerusalem	

=== Israeli MVPs ===
Season	Israeli MVP	Team
2014–15	(Israel) Lior Eliyahu	Hapoel Jerusalem
2015–16	(Israel) Lior Eliyahu (2×)	Hapoel Jerusalem
2016–17	(Israel) Karam Mashour	Bnei Herzliya
2017–18	(United States) (Israel) Joe Alexander	Hapoel Holon
2018–19	(Israel) Tomer Ginat	Hapoel Tel Aviv
2019–20	(Israel) Deni Avdija	Maccabi Tel Aviv
2020–21	(Israel) Yiftach Ziv	Hapoel Gilboa Galil
2021–22	(Israel) Nimrod Levi	Hapoel Galil Elyon
2022–23	(Israel) Tomer Ginat (2×)	Hapoel Tel Aviv
2023–24	(Israel) Roman Sorkin	Maccabi Tel Aviv
2024–25	(Israel) Gur Lavy	Hapoel Gilboa Galil
2025–26	(Israel) Roman Sorkin (2×)	Maccabi Tel Aviv

== Players with most awards ==
Player	Editions	Notes
(Israel) Lior Eliyahu	2	2012, 2015
(Israel) Gal Mekel	2	2011, 2013
(Israel) Roman Sorkin	2	2024, 2026
(United States) Jared Harper	2	2025, 2026
