= Nir Cohen =

Israeli retired basketball player

Personal information
- Born: June 10, 1981 (age 45) Krayot, Israel
- Listed height: 6 ft 7 in (2.01 m)

Career information
- College: Monroe CC (2003–2005); San Diego (2005-2007)
- NBA draft: 2007: undrafted
- Playing career: 2002–2015
- Position: Power forward

Career history
- 2002–2003: Hapoel Gilboa/Afula
- 2007–2008: Ironi Ramat Gan
- 2008-2009: Hapoel Gilboa Galil
- 2009-2010: Hapoel Afula
- 2010–2011: Hapoel Holon
- 2011–2012: Moadon Kadursal HaBikaa
- 2012–2013: Maccabi Rishon LeZion
- 2013–2014: Elitzur Maccabi Netanya
- 2014-2015: Hapoel Afula

Career highlights
- Israeli Rebounder of the Year (2011); NJCAA Player of the Year (2005)
Medals
Representing Israel
FIBA EuroBasket 2007

Nir Cohen (Hebrew: ניר כהן; born June 10, 1981, in Krayot) is an Israeli former basketball player (2.02 meters/6'7" tall) who was playing as a power forward and a center. As of 2016/2017 Cohen was a real estate agent.

== Early Career and College ball ==
Cohen grew in Hapoel Migdal HaEmek before he moved to play at Hapoel Gvat and then to the Junior Team of Maccabi Kiryat Bialik, Maccabi Ra'anana, Elitzur Kiryat Ata and Hapoel Gilboa/Afula from the 3rd division before moving to the United States playing College Basketball there in 2003.

Cohen joined Monroe Community College where he began studying Business Administration and played there till 2005, during those 2 years his team won the NJCAA Division I Region 15 Championship twice and he was named NJCAA Player of the Year in the 2004/2005 season. Afterwards he turned down offers from the likes of Marist College, University of Buffalo and Robert Morris University, and moved to the NCAA Division I University of San Diego where he played till his graduation in 2007, during those two years he knew harsh matches against Adam Morrison's Gonzaga University.

== Professional career ==
After graduating in the States, Cohen returned to Israel and looked for a professional club from the Israeli Basketball Super League to play at. He was signed in Ironi Ramat Gan of the then-rookie coach, Rubi Balinko, shortly after the season already started. During the 2007/2008 season Cohen based himself as a notable player in the league and was one of the best players the small club from Ramat Gan had to offer. He scored 20 points without a miss and was one of the leading players in the home victory of his team over the Euroleague powerhouse, Maccabi Tel Aviv B.C., which led to the firing of Oded Katash and the nominating of the back then General Manager, Zvika Sherf. He was named the Israeli Basketball Premier League Rising Star of 2008. Due to this season Cohen was called to play in the Israeli National Basketball Team.

In the summer of 2008 he was signed by Hapoel Gilboa Galil of the same Katash, but in his debut game in the 2008/2009 season opening match he was badly injured and missed most of the season.

In the summer of 2009 Cohen signed with Hapoel Afula from the Liga Leumit and played there trying to help lead the team back to the first division.

In 2010 Cohen returned to the Israeli Basketball Super League and signed with Hapoel Holon of Micky Dorsman for the 2010/2011 season where he help leading his team who suffered from financial problems to the 1/4 finals and was the leading Israeli rebounder that year with 6.1 rpg and top foulist in the league with 3.6 fouls per game.

In 2011/2012 Coehn played for Moadon Kadursal HaBikaa from the Super League but had a mediocre season with the club that lost 3–0 to Maccabi Tel Aviv in the playoffs, he left the team when the club relocated South and became Hapoel Eilat B.C. in the summer of 2012.

In 2012 Cohen registered to a Basketball Coaching certificate course in the University of Tel Aviv. He signed with Maccabi Rishon LeZion on December 9, 2012, for the 2012/2013 season.

In 2013/2014 he re-joined Rubi Balinko in Elitzur Maccabi Netanya from the Israeli Super League.

In 2014/2015 Cohen returned to play for Hapoel Afula in the 2nd Division.

Prior to the 2015/2016 season he trained with Hapoel Lev HaSharon from the Israeli Liga Artzit (3rd Division) before announcing his retirement after 9 years of professional career.
