= 2008–09 Israeli Basketball Super League =

2008-2009 Israeli Basketball Super League season
- League: Israeli Basketball Super League
- Sport: Basketball
- Duration: 26 October 2008 - 21 May 2009
- Games: 158
- Teams: 12
- TV partner(s): Sport 5, Israel 10

Regular Season
- League champions: Maccabi Tel Aviv
- Runners-up: Hapoel Jerusalem
- Top scorer: Luis Flores (Hapoel Holon)
- Relegated to Ligat Leumit: Elitzur Kiryat Ata; Maccabi Giv'at Shmuel

Final four
- Champions: Maccabi Tel Aviv
- Runners-up: Maccabi Haifa Heat
- Finals MVP: Carlos Arroyo (Maccabi Tel Aviv)

Israeli Basketball Super League seasons
- ← 2007–2008 2009–2010 →

The Israeli Basketball Super League (BSL) 2008-2009 season was the 55th season of the top basketball league in Israel. The season began on 26 October 2008 and ended on 21 May 2009. Maccabi Tel Aviv won its 48th league title, defeating Maccabi Haifa Heat 85–72 in the final. The defending champion was Hapoel Holon.

Each out of the 12 participating teams played 22 regular league games, one home game and one away game against each other team. The top eight teams qualified to the playoff, where they played best-of-5 series decided by the rankings at the end of the regular season (first against eighth, second against seventh and so on).

The four last ranked team competed in a best-of-5 series relegation playoff, where Elitzur Kiryat Ata and Maccabi Giv'at Shmuel lost and were relegated to Liga Leumit. They will be replaced by Maccabi Elitzur Netanya and Hapoel Afula, who qualified from Liga Leumit.

== Regular season ==
| | Team | Pld | W | L | PF | PA | Diff | Pts |
|---|---|---|---|---|---|---|---|---|
| 1. | Maccabi Tel Aviv | 22 | 19 | 3 | 2002 | 1659 | +343 | 41 |
| 2. | Hapoel Jerusalem | 22 | 17 | 5 | 1962 | 1828 | +134 | 39 |
| 3. | Maccabi Haifa | 22 | 14 | 8 | 1734 | 1651 | +83 | 36 |
| 4. | Hapoel Holon | 22 | 13 | 9 | 1811 | 1764 | +47 | 35 |
| 5. | Gilboa/Galil | 22 | 13 | 9 | 1728 | 1672 | +56 | 35 |
| 6. | Bnei HaSharon | 22 | 13 | 9 | 1713 | 1696 | +17 | 35 |
| 7. | Ironi Nahariya | 22 | 10 | 12 | 1790 | 1740 | +50 | 32 |
| 8. | Ironi Ashkelon | 22 | 8 | 14 | 1769 | 1797 | -28 | 30 |
| 9. | Ironi Ramat Gan | 22 | 8 | 14 | 1707 | 1861 | -154 | 30 |
| 10. | Maccabi Giv'at Shmuel | 22 | 7 | 15 | 1706 | 1788 | -82 | 29 |
| 11. | Maccabi Rishon LeZion | 22 | 7 | 15 | 1769 | 1903 | -134 | 29 |
| 12. | Elitzur Kiryat Ata | 22 | 3 | 19 | 1688 | 2020 | -332 | 25 |

| Qualification to Playoffs |
| Qualification to Relegation Playoffs |

Pld - Played; W - Won; L - Lost; PF - Points for; PA - Points against; Diff - Difference; Pts - Points.

| | BNS | EKA | HPG | HPH | HPJ | IAS | INA | IRG | MGS | MHA | MRL | MTA |
|---|---|---|---|---|---|---|---|---|---|---|---|---|
| Bnei HaSharon | | 82-67 | 71-66 | 76-87 | 77-73 | 74-91 | 80-76 | 88-78 | 96-75 | 97-78 | 90-92 | 83-75 |
| Elitzur Kiryat Ata | 79-74 | | 63-84 | 68-104 | 72-117 | 71-75 | 87-80 | 82-85 | 80-101 | 76-86 | 93-91 | 56-88 |
| Gilboa/Galil | 74-54 | 86-75 | | 58-64 | 87-90 | 70-68 | 84-72 | 79-84 | 77-72 | 88-83 | 101-87 | 64-87 |
| Hapoel Holon | 83-52 | 83-79 | 89-103 | | 90-69 | 85-76 | 77-75 | 93-67 | 85-89 | 75-82 | 107-106 | 72-91 |
| Hapoel Jerusalem | 92-85 | 103-94 | 81-74 | 91-81 | | 85-82 | 93-92 | 105-90 | 101-86 | 100-78 | 96-74 | 91-77 |
| Ironi Ashkelon | 81-76 | 96-74 | 78-79 | 94-84 | 78-87 | | 91-87 | 85-91 | 73-68 | 77-84 | 80-88 | 75-99 |
| Ironi Nahariya | 65-67 | 103-73 | 90-73 | 74-76 | 82-67 | 84-90 | | 81-74 | 89-80 | 61-71 | 77-84 | 85-102 |
| Ironi Ramat Gan | 68-77 | 87-77 | 72-81 | 85-70 | 108-92 | 66-81 | 64-79 | | 81-73 | 72-89 | 72-73 | 56-102 |
| Maccabi Giv'at Shmuel | 68-79 | 93-81 | 68-65 | 63-74 | 77-87 | 76-70 | 90-96 | 89-90 | | 60-76 | 87-76 | 73-77 |
| Maccabi Haifa | 70-75 | 92-75 | 72-79 | 90-71 | 73-80 | 79-68 | 57-76 | 94-74 | 77-69 | | 75-68 | 79-76 |
| Maccabi Rishon LeZion | 78-95 | 108-86 | 63-86 | 71-79 | 74-81 | 77-69 | 92-93 | 68-57 | 77-88 | 54-81 | | 93-96 |
| Maccabi Tel Aviv | 77-65 | 102-80 | 89-70 | 105-82 | 97-81 | 97-86 | 84-78 | 103-86 | 81-61 | 80-68 | 114-75 | |

== Playoff ==
The higher ranked team hosts games 1, 3 and 5 (if necessary). The lower ranked team hosts games 2 and 4 (if necessary).

| Team #1 | Agg. | Team #2 | Game 1 25–26 April | Game 2 3–4 May | Game 3 7 May | Game 4 10 May | Game 5 14 May |
|---|---|---|---|---|---|---|---|
| Maccabi Tel Aviv (1) | 3–1 | Ironi Ashkelon (8) | 95–96 (OT) | 86–69 | 92–69 | 97–65 | |
| Hapoel Jerusalem (2) | 3–0 | Ironi Nahariya (7) | 78–76 | 92–79 | 88–80 | | |
| Maccabi Haifa (3) | 3–1 | Bnei HaSharon (6) | 66–69 | 75–71 | 74–61 | 87–68 | |
| Hapoel Holon (4) | 2–3 | Galil/Gilboa (5) | 74–81 | 63–61 | 79–78 (OT) | 55–77 | 80–87(OT) |

== Final four ==
Semifinals; 19 May
Hapoel Jerusalem | 93
Maccabi Haifa | 98
Maccabi Tel Aviv | 72
Gilboa/Galil | 70

Final; 21 May
Maccabi Tel Aviv | 85
Maccabi Haifa | 72
Third place
Hapoel Jerusalem | 96
Gilboa/Galil | 101

== Relegation playoff ==
The higher ranked team hosts games 1, 3 and 5 (if necessary). The lower ranked team hosts games 2 and 4 (if necessary).

| Team #1 | Agg. | Team #2 | Game 1 26 April | Game 2 3 May | Game 3 7 May |
|---|---|---|---|---|---|
| Ironi Ramat Gan (9) | 3–0 | Elitzur Kiryat Ata (12) | 83–76 | 96–79 | 100–87 |
| Maccabi Giv'at Shmuel (10) | 0–3 | Maccabi Rishon LeZion (11) | 62–72 | 67–81 | 64–90 |

Elitzur Kiryat Ata and Maccabi Giv'at Shmuel were relegated to Liga Leumit.

== Awards ==
The 2008–2009 Basketball Super League Season Awards were granted during the Israeli Basketball Super League Administration Gala Dinner on May 16 to the players who stood out the most during the regular season and the playoff. The MVP awards for the best player and coach of the season were given before the final game had been played.

=== BSL 2008–2009 MVP ===
- (United States) Doron Perkins (Maccabi Haifa Heat)

=== BSL 2008–2009 Final MVP ===
- (Puerto Rico) Carlos Arroyo (Maccabi Tel Aviv)

=== Coach of the season ===
- (Israel) Avi Ashkenazi (Maccabi Haifa Heat)

=== All-BSL Team ===
- (United States) Doron Perkins (Maccabi Haifa Heat)
- (Dominican Republic) Luis Flores (Hapoel Holon)
- (Israel) Omri Casspi (Maccabi Tel Aviv)
- (Israel) Lior Eliyahu (Maccabi Tel Aviv)
- (United States) Omar Sneed (Hapoel Jerusalem)

=== Best 6th man ===
- (United States) Davon Jefferson (Maccabi Haifa Heat)

=== Best newcomer ===
- (Israel) Gal Mekel (Gilboa/Galil)

=== Most improving player ===
- (Israel) Uri Kukia (Hapoel Holon)

=== Best defensive player ===
- (United States) Brian Randle (Gilboa/Galil)

== See also ==
- Israeli Basketball State Cup 2008-09
