= 2007–08 Israeli Basketball Super League =

2007–2008 Israeli Basketball Super League season
- League: Israeli Basketball Super League
- Sport: Basketball
- Duration: October 2007 – May 2008
- Games: 270
- Teams: 10
- TV partner: Sport 5

Regular Season
- League champions: Hapoel Holon
- Runners-up: Maccabi Tel Aviv
- Top scorer: Steve Burtt
- Relegated to Ligat Leumit: Hapoel Gilboa/Afula

Final four
- Champions: Hapoel Holon
- Runners-up: Maccabi Tel Aviv
- Finals MVP: Terence Morris

Israeli Basketball Super League seasons
- ← 2006–2007 2008–2009 →

The 2007-2008 Israeli Basketball Super League season was the 54th season of top division basketball in Israel.

== Regular season ==
=== Standings ===
Qualified for the Final Four
Relegated to Liga Leumit

		Pts	P	W	L	F	Α	D
1.	Hapoel Holon	46^{1}	27	20	7	2365	2136	+229
2.	Maccabi Tel Aviv	45	27	18	9	2474	2235	+239
3.	Bnei HaSharon	44	27	17	10	2136	2051	+85
4.	Ironi Nahariya	42	27	15	12	2291	2237	+54
5.	Hapoel Jerusalem	40	27	13	14	2284	2294	-10
6.	Elitzur Ashkelon	40	27	13	14	2306	2408	-102
7.	Ironi Ramat Gan	39	27	12	15	2395	2482	-87
8.	Hapoel Galil Elyon	37	27	10	17	2281	2420	-139
9.	Maccabi Rishon LeZion	36	27	9	18	2153	2289	-136
10.	Hapoel Gilboa/Afula	35	27	8	19	2150	2285	-135

Source: Official Ligat HaAl website
Pts=Points, P=Matches played, W=Matches won, L=Matches lost, F=Points for, A=Points against, D=Points difference.
1.Due to a firecracker thrown into the court during the match between Hapoel Holon and Hapoel Jerusalem, Holon lost technically 20-0 and was not awarded with any points.

== Final four ==
See 2007-2008 Israeli Final Four

Semifinals; 27 May
Hapoel Holon	100
Ironi Naharia	89
Maccabi Tel Aviv	57
Bnei Hasharon	55

Final; 29 May
Hapoel Holon	73
Maccabi Tel Aviv	72
Third place
Bnei Hasharon	79
Ironi Naharia	69

== Awards ==
=== Regular season MVP ===
- (United States) P. J. Tucker (Hapoel Holon)

=== First team ===
- (Israel) Meir Tapiro (Bnei HaSharon)
- (United States) P. J. Tucker (Hapoel Holon)
- (United States) Otis Hill (Ironi Nahariya)
- (United States) Terence Morris (Maccabi Tel Aviv)
- (United States) (Israel) Jamie Arnold (Hapoel Jerusalem)

=== Coach of the season ===
- (Israel) Miki Dorsman (Hapoel Holon)

=== Sixth player of the season ===
- (Israel) Omri Casspi (Maccabi Tel Aviv)

=== Rising star ===
- (Israel) Nir Cohen (Ironi Ramat Gan)

=== Individual statistical awards ===
- Top scorer - (United States) Steve Burtt (Elitzur Ashkelon) (20.8 Per game)
- Top Rebounder - (Nigeria) Ndudi Ebi (Bnei HaSharon) (8.5)
- Top Assists - (United States) Lamont Jones (Hapoel Gilboa/Afula) (5.4)
- Top Steals - (Israel) Yogev Ohayon (Hapoel Galil Elyon) (2.0)

=== Final MVP ===
- (United States) Terence Morris (Maccabi Tel Aviv)
