= 2008–2009 Israeli Final Four =

The 2008–2009 Israeli Final Four , the fourth Israeli Final Four was held at Yad Eliyahu Arena, Tel Aviv, Israel on 19 and 21 May 2009 to determine the winner of the 2008–2009 Israeli League. The contestants were Maccabi Tel Aviv, the 2007–08 Israeli League runner-up, Hapoel Jerusalem, Maccabi Haifa, the 2008–09 Israeli State Cup runner-up and Gilboa/Galil. Maccabi Tel Aviv won their 48th Israeli League crown, beating Maccabi Haifa 85-72 in the final.

== Venue ==
The Yad Eliyahu Arena is an indoor sports arena in Tel Aviv, Israel. Opened in 1963 with its seating capacity varying from 5,000 to 11,700, it had hosted the 1971–1972 FIBA European Champions Cup final, the 1993–1994 FIBA European Championship Final Four, the 2003–2004 Euro league Final Four, the 2005-2006 Israeli Final Four, the 2006-2007 Israeli Final Four and the 2007-2008 Israeli Final Four.

=== Bracket ===
Semifinals; 19 May
Hapoel Jerusalem	93
Maccabi Haifa	98
Maccabi Tel Aviv	72
Gilboa/Galil	70

Final; 21 May
Maccabi Tel Aviv	85
Maccabi Haifa	72
Third place
Hapoel Jerusalem	96
Gilboa/Galil	101

=== Semifinals ===
All times are in Israel Summer Time.

==== Semifinal 1 ====
19 May 2009
18:00

Hapoel Jerusalem	93–98 (OT)	Maccabi Haifa
Scoring by quarter: 17–23, 22–30, 16–15, 29–16, Overtime: 9–14
Pts: Jefferson 24; Rebs: Perkins 11; Asts: Perkins 9		Pts: Watson 26; Rebs: Watson 10; Asts: Bowers 5

Yad Eliyahu Arena, Tel Aviv
Attendance: 10,383

==== Semifinal 2 ====
19 May 2009
20:55

Maccabi Tel Aviv	72–70	Gilboa/Galil
Scoring by quarter: 17–9, 20–21, 21–22, 14–18
Pts: Eliyahu 20; Rebs: Casspi 9 Asts: Burstein 4		Pts: Kadir 17; Rebs: Kadir 9 Asts: Kadir, Roberts 5

Yad Eliyahu Arena, Tel Aviv
Attendance: 10,383

==== Third-place playoff ====
21 May 2009
18:00

Hapoel Jerusalem	96–101	Gilboa/Galil
Scoring by quarter: 28–30, 20–23, 22–24, 26–24
Pts: Francis 22; Rebs: Francis 7 Asts: Naimi 7		Pts: Kadir 17; Rebs: Kadir 9 Asts: Kadir 5

Yad Eliyahu Arena, Tel Aviv
Attendance: 10,383

==== Final ====
21 May 2009
20:55

Maccabi Tel Aviv	85–72	Maccabi Haifa
Scoring by quarter: 16–19, 27–20, 22–19, 20–14
Pts: Arroyo 22; Rebs: Fischer 11; Asts: Arroyo 6		Pts: Perkins 25; Rebs: Jefferson 12; Asts: Perkins 3

Yad Eliyahu Arena, Tel Aviv
Attendance: 10,383

=== Awards ===
Carlos Arroyo – Final MVP
