= 2005–06 Israeli Basketball Super League =

2005–2006 Israeli Basketball Super League season
- League: Israeli Basketball Super League
- Sport: Basketball
- Duration: October 2005 – May 2006
- Games: 300
- Teams: 11
- TV partner: Sport 5

Regular Season
- League champions: Maccabi Tel Aviv
- Runners-up: Hapoel Jerusalem
- Top scorer: Marcus Hatten (Hapoel Tel Aviv)
- Relegated to Ligat Leumit: Hapoel Ramat Hasharon

Final four
- Champions: Maccabi Tel Aviv
- Runners-up: Hapoel Jerusalem
- Finals MVP: Anthony Parker

Israeli Basketball Super League seasons
- ← 2004–05 2006-07 →

The 2005–2006 Israeli Basketball Super League season was the 52nd season of top division basketball in Israel.

== Regular season ==
=== Standings ===
| Qualified for the Final Four |
| Relegated to Liga Leumit |

| | | Pts | P | W | L | F | Α | D |
|---|---|---|---|---|---|---|---|---|
| 1. | Maccabi Tel Aviv | 56 | 30 | 26 | 4 | 2776 | 2335 | +441 |
| 2. | Hapoel Jerusalem | 53 | 30 | 23 | 7 | 2578 | 2364 | +214 |
| 3. | Maccabi Rishon LeZion | 47 | 30 | 17 | 13 | 2551 | 2427 | +124 |
| 4. | Ironi Nahariya | 47 | 30 | 17 | 13 | 2561 | 2451 | +110 |
| 5. | Hapoel Galil Elyon | 44 | 30 | 14 | 16 | 2605 | 2602 | +3 |
| 6. | Elitzur Ashkelon | 43 | 30 | 13 | 17 | 2436 | 2496 | -60 |
| 7. | Maccabi Giv'at Shmuel | 43 | 30 | 13 | 17 | 2518 | 2667 | -149 |
| 8. | Hapoel Tel Aviv | 43 | 30 | 13 | 17 | 2314 | 2376 | -62 |
| 9. | Bnei Hasharon | 42 | 30 | 12 | 18 | 2418 | 2560 | -142 |
| 10. | Ironi Ramat Gan | 40 | 30 | 10 | 20 | 2372 | 2605 | -233 |
| 11. | Hapoel Ramat Hasharon | 37 | 30 | 7 | 23 | 2437 | 2683 | -246 |

Source: Official Ligat HaAl website
Pts=Points, P=Matches played, W=Matches won, L=Matches lost, F=Points for, A=Points against, D=Points difference.

== Final four ==
Semifinals; 6 June
Maccabi Rishon Lezion | 65
Hapoel Jerusalem | 66
Maccabi Tel Aviv | 85
Ironi Naharia | 72

Final; 8 June
Maccabi Tel Aviv | 96
Hapoel Jerusalem | 66
Third place
Maccabi Rishon Lezion | 87
Ironi Naharia | 84

== Awards ==
=== Regular season MVP ===
- (United States) Timmy Bowers (Maccabi Giv'at Shmuel)

=== First team ===
- (United States) Timmy Bowers (Maccabi Giv'at Shmuel)
- (Israel) Or Eitan (Maccabi Rishon LeZion)
- (United States) Omar Sneed (Maccabi Rishon LeZion)
- (Israel) Lior Eliyahu (Hapoel Galil Elyon)
- (United States) Mario Austin (Hapoel Jerusalem)

=== Coach of the season ===
- (Israel) Ofer Berkowitz (Maccabi Giv'at Shmuel)

=== Israeli MVP ===
- (Israel) Lior Eliyahu (Hapoel Galil Elyon)

=== Rising star ===
- (Israel) Yuval Naimi (Maccabi Giv'at Shmuel)

=== Individual statistical awards ===
- Top scorer – (United States) Marcus Hatten (Hapoel Tel Aviv) (23 Per game)
- Top Rebounder – (United States) Ousmane Cisse (Bnei Hasharon) (10)
- Top Assists – (Israel) Meir Tapiro (Hapoel Jerusalem) (5.4)
- Top Steals – (United States) Roi Berkowitz (Hapoel Ramat Hasharon) (2.7
