= 2006–07 Israeli Basketball Super League =

2006–2007 Israeli Basketball Super League season
- League: Israeli Basketball Super League
- Sport: Basketball
- Duration: October 2006 – May 2007
- Games: 270
- Teams: 10
- TV partner: Sport 5

Regular Season
- League champions: Maccabi Tel Aviv
- Runners-up: Hapoel Jerusalem
- Top scorer: Ricardo Marsh (Ironi Ashkelon)
- Relegated to Ligat Leumit: Maccabi Giv'at Shmuel

Final four
- Champions: Maccabi Tel Aviv
- Runners-up: Hapoel Jerusalem

Israeli Basketball Super League seasons
- ← 2005–2006 2007-2008 →

The 2006–2007 Israeli Basketball Super League season was the 53rd season of top division basketball in Israel.

== Regular season ==
=== Standings ===
Qualified for the Final Four
Relegated to Liga Leumit

		Pts	P	W	L	F	Α	D
1.	Maccabi Tel Aviv	52	27	25	2	2678	2206	+472
2.	Hapoel Jerusalem	47	27	20	7	2548	2497	+51
3.	Bnei Hasharon	44	27	17	10	2415	2288	+127
4.	Hapoel Galil Elyon	42	27	15	12	2554	2513	+41
5.	Ironi Nahariya	41	27	14	13	2364	2222	+142
6.	Hapoel Gilboa/Afula	38	27	11	16	2254	2365	-111
7.	Ironi Ramat Gan	36	27	9	18	2371	2487	-116
8.	Maccabi Rishon LeZion	36	27	9	18	2167	2321	-154
9.	Elitzur Ashkelon	35	27	8	19	2286	2479	-193
10.	Maccabi Giv'at Shmuel	34	27	7	20	2251	2510	-259

Source: Official Ligat HaAl website
Pts=Points, P=Matches played, W=Matches won, L=Matches lost, F=Points for, A=Points against, D=Points difference.

== Final four ==
Semifinals; 29 May
Hapoel Jerusalem	96
Bnei Hasharon	83
Maccabi Tel Aviv	93
Hapoel Galil Elyon	87

Final; 31 May
Maccabi Tel Aviv	80
Hapoel Jerusalem	78
Third place
Bnei Hasharon	80
Hapoel Galil Elyon	90

== Awards ==
=== Regular season MVP ===
- (United States) Lee Nailon (Bnei Hasharon)

=== First team ===
- (Croatia) Nikola Vujčić (Maccabi Tel Aviv)
- (United States) Mario Austin (Hapoel Jerusalem)
- (United States) Lee Nailon (Bnei Hasharon)
- (United States) Chester Simmons (Hapoel Galil Elyon)
- (Israel) Raviv Limonad (Ironi Nahariya)

=== Coach of the season ===
- (Israel) Oded Kattash (Hapoel Galil Elyon)

=== Best Defender ===
- (United States) Terence Morris (Hapoel Jerusalem)

=== Israeli MVP ===
- (Israel) Raviv Limonad (Ironi Nahariya)

=== Rising star ===
- (Israel) Guni Israeli (Hapoel Gilboa/Afula)

=== Individual statistical awards ===
- Top scorer – (United States) Ricardo Marsh (Elitzur Ashkelon) (20.9 Per game)
- Top Rebounder – (United States) Kenny Adelka (Hapoel Galil Elyon) (9.3)
- Top Assists – (Israel) Guni Israeli (Hapoel Gilboa/Afula) (6.5)
- Top Steals – (United States) Marcus Hatten (Elitzur Ashkelon) (2.7)
