= 2007–2008 Israeli Final Four =

The 2007–2008 Israeli Final Four , the third Israeli Final Four, was held at Yad Eliyahu Arena, Tel Aviv, Israel on 27 and 29 May 2008 to determine the winner of the 2007–2008 Israeli League. The contestants were Maccabi Tel Aviv, the 2006–2007 Israeli League champion and the 2007–2008 Israeli State Cup runner-up, Hapoel Holon, Bnei Hasharon and Ironi Naharia. Hapoel Holon won their 1st Israeli League crown, beating Maccabi Tel Aviv 73-72 in the final.

== Venue ==
The Yad Eliyahu Arena is an indoor sports arena in Tel Aviv, Israel. Opened in 1963 with its seating capacity varying from 5,000 to 11,700, it had hosted the 1971–1972 FIBA European Champions Cup final, the 1993–1994 FIBA European Championship Final Four, the 2003–2004 Euroleague Final Four, the 2005-2006 Israeli Final Four and the 2006-2007 Israeli Final Four.

=== Bracket ===
Semifinals; 27 May
Hapoel Holon	100
Ironi Naharia	89
Maccabi Tel Aviv	57
Bnei Hasharon	55

Final; 29 May
Hapoel Holon	73
Maccabi Tel Aviv	72
Third place
Bnei Hasharon	79
Ironi Naharia	69

=== Semifinals ===
All times are in Israel Summer Time.

==== Semifinal 1 ====
27 May 2008
18:00

Hapoel Holon	100–89	Ironi Naharia
Scoring by quarter: 19–26, 31–17, 28–16, 22–30
Pts: Tucker 23; Rebs: Tucker 13; Asts: Izraeli 7		Pts: Gilchrist 26; Rebs: Peleg, Hill 5 Asts: Gilchrist, Pledger 6

Yad Eliyahu Arena, Tel Aviv
Attendance: 10,383

==== Semifinal 2 ====
27 May 2008
20:55

Maccabi Tel Aviv	57–55	Bnei Hasharon
Scoring by quarter: 22–9, 7–17, 15–24, 13–5
Pts: Vujčić 13; Rebs: Morris 10; Asts: Cummings 4		Pts: Williams 25; Rebs: Ebi 8 Asts: Tapiro 8

Yad Eliyahu Arena, Tel Aviv
Attendance: 10,383

==== Third-place playoff ====
29 May 2008
18:00

Bnei Hasharon	79–69	Ironi Naharia
Scoring by quarter: 20–16, 21-21, 22–16, 16-16
Pts: Tapiro 17; Rebs: Tapiro 12; Asts: Tapiro 6		Pts: Kozikaro 17; Rebs: Kozikaro 7 Asts: Gilchrist 6

Yad Eliyahu Arena, Tel Aviv
Attendance: 10,383

==== Final ====
29 May 2008
20:55

Report

Hapoel Holon	73–72	Maccabi Tel Aviv
Scoring by quarter: 23–23, 14–15, 15–18, 21–16
Pts: Tucker 18; Rebs: Tucker 8 Asts: Izraeli 4		Pts: Morris 20; Rebs: Morris 7 Asts: Halperin 5

Yad Eliyahu Arena, Tel Aviv
Attendance: 10,383

=== Awards ===
Terence Morris – Final MVP
