= Gal Mekel =

Israeli basketball player (born 1988)

Gal Mekel גל מקל
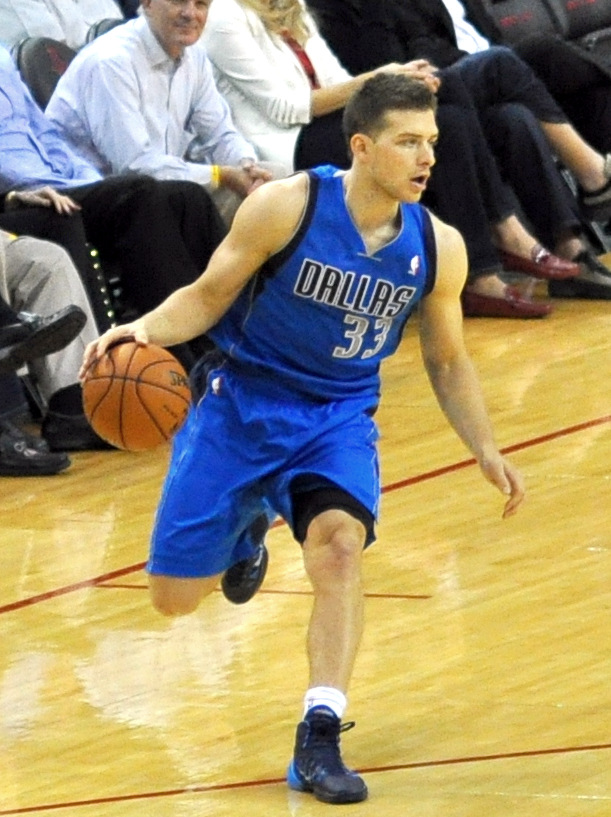
- Mekel with the Dallas Mavericks in 2013

Personal information
- Born: March 4, 1988 (age 38) Ramat HaSharon, Israel
- Listed height: 1.91 m (6 ft 3 in)
- Listed weight: 87 kg (192 lb)

Career information
- College: Wichita State (2006–2008)
- NBA draft: 2008: undrafted
- Playing career: 2008–2022
- Position: Point guard
- Number: 33, 24

Career history
- 2008–2010: Maccabi Tel Aviv
- 2008–2010: →Hapoel Gilboa Galil
- 2010–2011: Hapoel Gilboa Galil
- 2011–2012: Benetton Treviso
- 2012–2013: Maccabi Haifa
- 2013–2014: Dallas Mavericks
- 2014: →Texas Legends
- 2014: New Orleans Pelicans
- 2015: Nizhny Novgorod
- 2015: Crvena zvezda
- 2016–2017: Maccabi Tel Aviv
- 2017–2018: Gran Canaria
- 2018–2019: Zenit
- 2019–2020: Reggiana
- 2020–2021: Málaga
- 2021–2022: Andorra

Career highlights
- 2× Israeli League MVP (2011, 2013); 2× Israeli Cup MVP (2016, 2017); 2× Israeli League champion (2010, 2013); 2× Israeli Cup winner (2016, 2017); Israeli League Rising Star (2009); 3× All-Israeli League First Team (2011, 2013, 2016); 2× Israeli Premier League Assists Leader (2011, 2016)
- Stats at NBA.com
- Stats at Basketball Reference

Gal Mekel (Hebrew: גל מקל, pronounced [ˈɡal ˈmekel]; born March 4, 1988) is an Israeli former professional basketball player. He played for the Dallas Mavericks and spent time in Europe and Israel.

He played college basketball for two years at Wichita State University. He then played in the Israeli Super League for Maccabi Tel Aviv, Hapoel Gilboa Galil, and Maccabi Haifa, and in the Italian Serie A League for Benetton Treviso. He was a two-time Israeli Super League MVP, in 2011 and 2013. He was the Israeli Premier League Assists Leader in 2011 and 2016.

In 2013, he signed a three-year minimum fully guaranteed contract with the Dallas Mavericks, becoming the second Israeli to join the NBA; he also holds a Polish passport.

== Early and personal life ==
Mekel is Jewish, and was born in Ramat HaSharon, Israel, to Alon and Ariela Mekel. He has four brothers and two sisters. He attended Alliance High School in Tel Aviv.

He started his way in the Hapoel Tel Aviv youth team. Shortly after, he moved to the A.S. Ramat HaSharon youth team where he demonstrated a good playmaking ability. His ability caught the eyes of basketball giant Maccabi Tel Aviv, where he moved at the age of 17, and subsequently won the 2005–06 Israeli Youth League.

His father-in-law was American-Israeli former basketball player Willie Sims, after marrying daughter Danyella.

== College career ==
Mekel played college basketball for two years at Wichita State. In his rookie season (2006–07), by mid-season he was promoted to starter. He finished his first season with averages of 13 minutes and four points per game.

In the 2007–08 season, Mekel improved his stats to 9.3 ppg and 3.7 apg while playing more than 30 minutes per game. Despite his improvement he decided to leave the team after that season.

== Professional career ==
=== Maccabi Tel Aviv (2008) ===
On March 28, 2008, Mekel signed his first professional contract with Maccabi Tel Aviv, for the remainder of the 2007–08 season.

=== Hapoel Gilboa Galil (2008–2009) ===
For the 2008–09 season, Maccabi Tel Aviv loaned Mekel to Hapoel Gilboa Galil, an Israeli club that is known for promoting young talents, in order to receive some playing experience, and return better the next year. In Galil, he averaged 6.9 points and 2.7 assists per game. He excelled in the league's playoff quarter-finals against Hapoel Holon, helping his team reach the Israeli Super League Final Four, where they lost to Maccabi Tel Aviv. Mekel ended up winning the Israeli Super League Rising Star award.

=== Return to Maccabi (2009) ===
After a good season with Galil, Mekel returned to Maccabi Tel Aviv. They designated him at the point guard substitute spot, behind the team's newcomer Doron Perkins, who had won the Israeli Super League MVP award in the previous season. Mekel recorded 13 points and 5 assists in his debut game with Maccabi Tel Aviv, against Ironi Nahariya, in the second round of the 2009–10 Israeli Super League. In December 2009, he asked to be loaned out again, after the minority of minutes he was receiving.

=== Return to Gilboa Galil (2009–2011) ===
Mekel was loaned back to Gilboa/Galil, just 6 months after he finished his first loan to the same team. In Galil, Mekel shared the point guard position with Jeremy Pargo. Together, they led Galil to their second Israeli Super League title, after surprising Maccabi in the league's final. Mekel was a key member in the team averaging, 7.5 points and 4.3 assists per game, in 25.5 minutes per game.

In 2010, Mekel got offers from the Israeli clubs Bnei HaSharon and Maccabi Haifa, but he decided to stay in Galil, signing a one-year contract with them. He played with the team in the EuroLeague 2010–11 qualifying rounds, but didn't help the team to pass the qualification's first round, where they were eliminated by KK Hemofarm, from Serbia. At the Israeli national domestic level, Mekel led Galil to a 2nd-place finish at the end of the regular season. They were able to repeat their previous season's trip to the league's final, once again against Maccabi, but this time they lost. Mekel also had a great individual season, which concluded in him winning the Israeli Super League MVP award. He was the Israeli Premier League Assists Leader in 2011.

He also played in the 2011 BSL All-Star Game.

=== Benetton Treviso (2011–2012) ===
On July 5, 2011, Mekel signed a two-year contract with the Italian team Benetton Treviso. With Benetton, he reached the 2011–12 EuroCup Last 16, and finished in 11th place in the Italian 2011–12 LBA league. He averaged 6.3 points and 3.7 assists per game in the Italian League, and 4 points and 2 assists per game in the EuroCup. At the end of the season, the club ceased the activity of the first team, focusing on youth sector.

=== Maccabi Haifa (2012–2013) ===
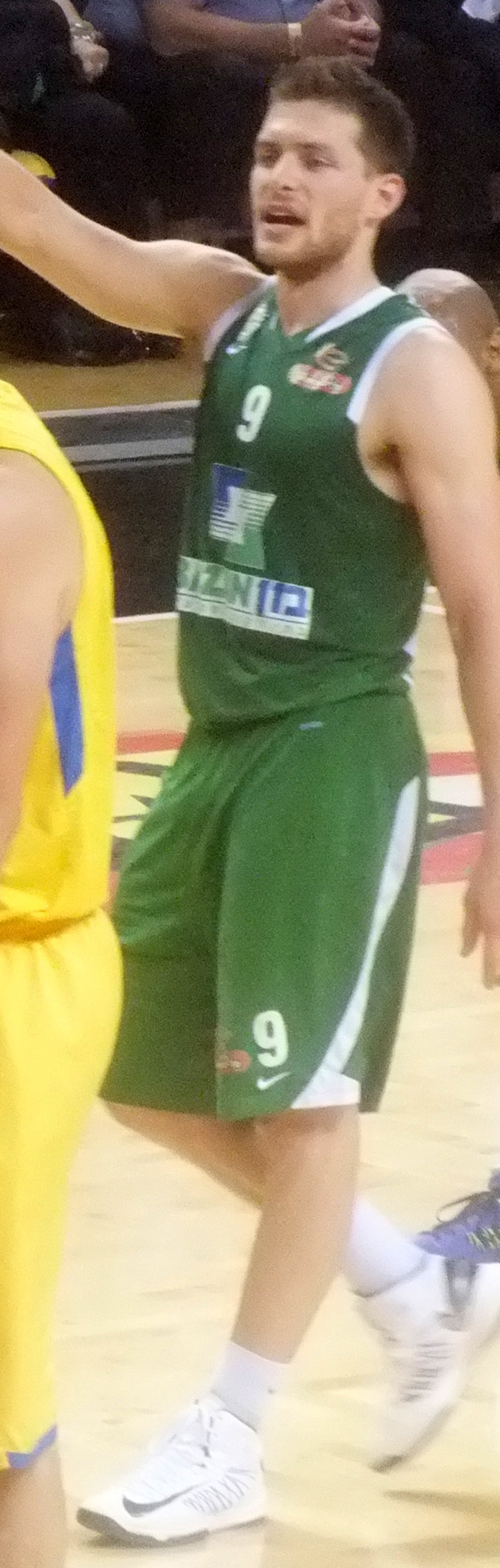
Mekel with Maccabi Haifa in June 2013

At the start of the 2012–13 season, Mekel wanted to stay with a club that was playing in European-wide competitions, but he also had tryouts with the Utah Jazz of the NBA; however, after not receiving a sufficient contract offer from the Jazz, he agreed to terms with the Israeli club Maccabi Haifa. Mekel led the team to a 2nd-place finish at the end of the Israeli Super League regular season, and to the Israeli State Cup final, where they lost to Maccabi Tel Aviv. Haifa got another chance at a title that season, when they reached the Israeli Super league's final, which was held at their home court of Romema Arena. The Greens went on to win the match and the championship, after a great performance from Mekel: 21 points and 7 assists, after which he received the Israeli League MVP award, which he had won a night before.

=== Dallas Mavericks (2013–2014) ===
On July 11, 2013, the Dallas Mavericks signed Mekel to a three-year minimum fully guaranteed contract, and he became the second Israeli to join the NBA. Mekel played with the Mavericks in the 2013 NBA Summer League, and finished with averages of 9.7 points and 5 assists per game.

In his debut regular season game for the Mavs on October 30, 2013, Mekel recorded 2 points, 2 rebounds, and 3 assists in a 118–109 win over the Atlanta Hawks. Two Israeli players played on opposing NBA teams for the first time on November 1 when Mekel and the Mavericks played Omri Casspi and the Rockets. The two had been teammates on the Israeli Under-16, Under-18, and Under-20 teams, and on the Maccabi Tel Aviv junior team. In that game, the Houston Rockets beat the Dallas Mavericks 113–105 in Houston. Casspi scored 12 points in 21 minutes, and Mekel scored 11 points and dished off 6 assists in 23 minutes in his best NBA game to date. On November 30, he started in his first NBA game against the Minnesota Timberwolves and scored 6 points and dished off 7 assists in 26 minutes. The Mavs lost that game though, 106–112. After the game on January 13, 2014, Mekel was placed on the injured list due to a torn meniscus in his right knee, which required surgery and at least 4–6 weeks of recovery.

On March 4, 2014, Mekel was assigned to the Texas Legends of the NBA D-League. On March 9, he was recalled by the Mavericks. On March 15, he was reassigned to the Legends. He was recalled three days later.

On October 29, 2014, Mekel was waived by the Mavericks.

=== New Orleans Pelicans (2014) ===
On December 5, 2014, Mekel signed a two-year, non-guaranteed contract with the New Orleans Pelicans. However, he was later waived by the Pelicans on December 19 after appearing in just four games.

=== Nizhny Novgorod (2015) ===
On February 24, 2015, Mekel moved to Russia, and signed with Nizhny Novgorod, until the end of the 2015–16 season. Nizhny Novgorod's 2014–15 VTB United League season was ended, after being eliminated by CSKA Moscow 3–0 in their VTB United League semifinal playoff series. In July 2015, he parted ways with Nizhny.

=== Crvena zvezda (2015) ===
On August 27, 2015, Mekel signed a one-year contract with Serbian ABA League team Crvena zvezda. However, on December 3, 2015, Mekel parted ways with Crvena zvezda after appearing in 13 games.

=== Third stint with Maccabi (2016–2017) ===
On January 10, 2016, Mekel returned to Maccabi Tel Aviv for a third stint, signing a 3½-year contract. Mekel won the Israeli State Cup titles in 2016 and 2017, earning the Finals MVP honors for two consecutive years. He was the Israeli Premier League Assists Leader in 2016. On July 4, 2017, Mekel parted ways with Maccabi.

=== Gran Canaria (2017–2018) ===
On July 14, 2017, Mekel signed a one-year deal with the Spanish team Herbalife Gran Canaria. In 17 EuroCup games, he averaged 9.6 points and 5 assists per game. Mekel helped Gran Canaria to reach the 2018 EuroCup Quarterfinals, as well as reaching the 2018 ACB Semifinals, which helped them earn a qualification to the EuroLeague as the highest-placed team in the Liga ACB without a long-term EuroLeague licence.

=== Zenit Saint Petersburg (2018–2019) ===
On October 8, 2018, Mekel signed with the Russian team Zenit Saint Petersburg for the 2018–19 season. In 27 games played in the VTB League and the EuroCup, he averaged 7.4 points, 5.3 assists and 1.9 rebounds in 18.8 minutes per game. Mekel helped Zenit reach the 2019 VTB League Semifinals, where they eventually were eliminated by CSKA Moscow. On July 7, 2019, Mekel parted ways with Zenit.

=== Grissin Bon Reggio Emilia (2019–2020) ===
On August 15, 2019, Mekel signed with Grissin Bon Reggio Emilia of the Lega Basket Serie A (LBA). On October 20, 2019, Mekel recorded a season-high 21 points in 27 minutes, shooting 7-of-13 from the field, along with five assists, leading Reggio Emilia to an 84–72 win over OriOra Pistoia.

Mekel parted ways with the club due to the coronavirus infection in Italy.

=== Unicaja Malaga (2020–2021) ===
On March 5, 2020, he signed with Unicaja Málaga of the Spanish Liga ACB.

=== MoraBanc Andorra (2021–2022) ===
On October 11, 2021, he has signed with MoraBanc Andorra of the Liga ACB.

== National team career ==
Mekel is a member of the Israel national basketball team. He participated in the 2009, 2011, 2015 and 2017 EuroBasket tournaments.

== Career statistics ==
Legend
| GP | Games played | GS | Games started | MPG | Minutes per game |
| FG% | Field-goal percentage | 3P% | 3-point field-goal percentage | FT% | Free-throw percentage |
| RPG | Rebounds per game | APG | Assists per game | SPG | Steals per game |
| BPG | Blocks per game | PPG | Points per game | PIR | Performance index rating |
| **Bold** | Career high |

=== NBA ===
==== Regular season ====
| Year | Team | GP | GS | MPG | FG% | 3P% | FT% | RPG | APG | SPG | BPG | PPG |
|---|---|---|---|---|---|---|---|---|---|---|---|---|
| 2013–14 | Dallas | **31** | **1** | 9.4 | **.349** | **.250** | **.667** | **.9** | 2.0 | .1 | .0 | **2.4** |
| 2014–15 | New Orleans | 4 | 0 | **10.8** | .150 | .0 | .0 | .3 | **3.3** | **.5** | .0 | 1.5 |
| Career | | 35 | 1 | 9.6 | .311 | .217 | .667 | .8 | 2.2 | .2 | .0 | 2.3 |

=== EuroLeague ===
| Year | Team | GP | GS | MPG | FG% | 3P% | FT% | RPG | APG | SPG | BPG | PPG | PIR |
|---|---|---|---|---|---|---|---|---|---|---|---|---|---|
| 2009–10 | Maccabi | 1 | 0 | 1 | 0 | 0 | 0 | 0 | 0 | 0 | 0 | 0 | -1 |
| 2014–15 | Nizhny Novgorod | 6 | 0 | **20.7** | **.482** | .286 | .824 | **2.3** | **4.7** | **.7** | .0 | **11.7** | **11.7** |
| 2015–16 | Crvena zvezda | 4 | 4 | 20.2 | .230 | .333 | **1.00** | 1.5 | 2.8 | .3 | **.3** | 3.8 | 0.8 |
| 2016–17 | Maccabi | **24** | **10** | 15.9 | .398 | .400 | .606 | 2.2 | 3.3 | .3 | 0 | 4.5 | 5.6 |
| Career | | 35 | 14 | 16.7 | .400 | .371 | .692 | 2.1 | 3.4 | .3 | .1 | 5.5 | 2.0 |

=== College ===
| Year | Team | GP | GS | MPG | FG% | 3P% | FT% | RPG | APG | SPG | BPG | PPG |
|---|---|---|---|---|---|---|---|---|---|---|---|---|
| 2006–07 | Wichita State | 31 | 3 | 13.0 | .443 | .354 | .647 | 1.0 | 1.6 | .4 | .0 | 4.0 |
| 2007–08 | Wichita State | 31 | 26 | 30.7 | .354 | .287 | .877 | 3.1 | 3.7 | .3 | .0 | 9.2 |
| **Career** | | 62 | 29 | 21.9 | .379 | .306 | .809 | 2.1 | 2.6 | .4 | .0 | 6.6 |

Source: RealGM

== See also ==
- List of select Jewish basketball players
- List of European basketball players in the United States
