= Israeli Basketball Premier League =

Top division of Israeli basketball

Israeli Basketball Premier League ליגת העל
- Founded: 1953; 73 years ago
- First season: 1953–54
- Country: Israel
- Confederation: FIBA Europe
- Number of teams: 14
- Level on pyramid: 1
- Relegation to: Liga Leumit
- Domestic cup: State Cup
- Supercup: League Cup
- International cup(s): EuroLeague; EuroCup; Champions League; Europe Cup
- Current champions: Maccabi Tel Aviv
- Most championships: Maccabi Tel Aviv (58 titles)
- CEO: Ari Steinberg
- TV partners: Sport 5
- Website: basket.co.il
- 2026–27 Israeli Basketball Premier League

Ligat HaAl (Hebrew: ליגת העל, lit., Supreme League or Premier League), or the Israeli Basketball Premier League, is a professional basketball league in Israel and the highest level of basketball in the country. The league's name is abbreviated as either BSL (Basketball Super League) or ISBL (Israeli Basketball Super League). For sponsorship reasons, the league is also referred to as Ligat Winner Sal (Hebrew: ליגת ווינר סל), lit. Winner Basket League, with "Winner" being the name of a game operated by the league's primary sponsor, Toto Winner.

The league is run by the Israeli Basketball Super League Administration Ltd.

== Overview ==
Ligat HaAl comprises the top 14 basketball clubs in Israel, and was founded in 1954.

The league itself is most known in Europe, due to the success of the Israeli teams in European-wide competitions, such as the EuroLeague, EuroCup (formerly called the ULEB Cup), and FIBA's EuroChallenge (formerly called the FIBA EuroCup). Many undrafted and free agent players from Europe and the NBA play in the Israeli league, as an alternative to NBA competition.

The league is the first division in Israeli basketball: the team that finishes last in a season is relegated to the Second Division, while the Second Division's top eight teams compete in a play-off system right after the end of the regular season, with the team that reaches the finals series being promoted to the Premier League for the following season.

== Format ==
There are 14 teams in the league, and they play against each other three times a season. The top eight teams advance to the five-game series Quarter-finals. The winners of the Quarter-finals advance to the Final Four.

== Records ==
- On 9 October 1994, J.J. Eubanks, of Maccabi Ramat-Gan scored 101 points against Beitar Ramat-Gan, a record in the first league.
- During the 1993-94 season, Kevin Bradshaw, of Givaat Shmuel scored 100 pts against Maccabi Tverya, a record in the second league.

== Links with the NBA ==
In the 1980s and the early 1990s, the Israeli League stars played in Israel against the Phoenix Suns, Cleveland Cavaliers, Orlando Magic, and Los Angeles Lakers.

In October 2005, Maccabi Tel Aviv defeated the Toronto Raptors 105–103 in an exhibition game played in Toronto, Canada; this was the first victory for any European or Israeli team over an NBA team on its home court.

Over the years, many of its players joined the NBA. In 2009, Omri Casspi became the first Israeli-born NBA player with the Sacramento Kings. Prior to that, three players were drafted: Doron Sheffer (who played U.S. college basketball at Connecticut), Yotam Halperin and Lior Eliyahu. Oded Kattash agreed to play with the New York Knicks, but he never played in the NBA because of the 1998–99 NBA lockout that started on July 1, 1998.

In the 2009 NBA draft, Omri Casspi was selected 23rd overall by the Sacramento Kings, and Gal Mekel followed in 2013 by signing with Dallas Mavericks. In 2016, Dragan Bender became the highest selection from the Israeli Basketball Premier League to be selected in an NBA draft with the Phoenix Suns taking him at 4th overall. Other players who have moved from the league to the NBA include: Will Bynum, Anthony Parker, Joe Ingles, Roger Mason Jr., P. J. Tucker, Eugene "Pooh" Jeter, Elijah Bryant, Carlos Arroyo, and Nate Robinson.

In 2016, Amar'e Stoudemire retired from the NBA. Then, on August 1, 2016, he signed a two-year deal with Hapoel Jerusalem, a team he co-owns. On October 1, 2016, he helped Hapoel Jerusalem win the 2016 Israeli Basketball League Cup. He also played for Maccabi Tel Aviv during the 2019–20 season, helping them win the 2019–20 Israeli Basketball Premier League championship. He was named MVP of the championship game.

In 2020, two players declared for the NBA draft. The first being Deni Avdija from Maccabi Tel Aviv and the second being Yam Madar from Hapoel Tel Aviv. Avdija was selected in the first round, 9th overall, by the Washington Wizards, and Madar was taken in the second round with the 47th pick of the draft by the Boston Celtics.

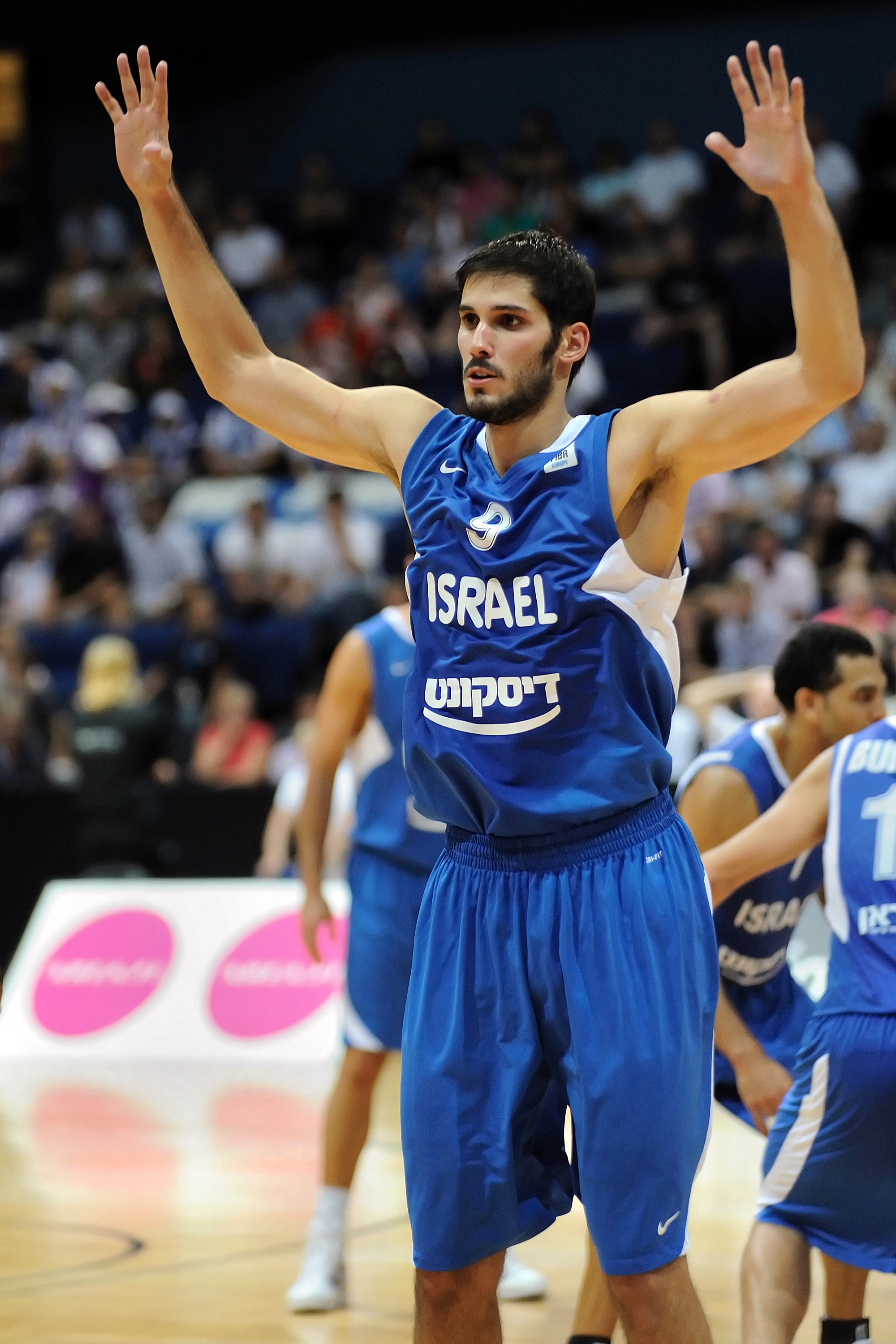
Omri Casspi

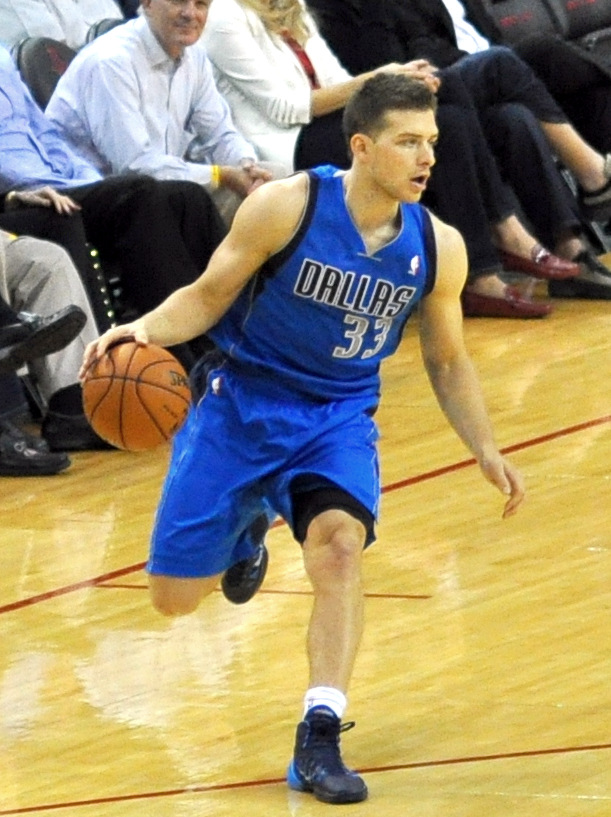
Gal Mekel

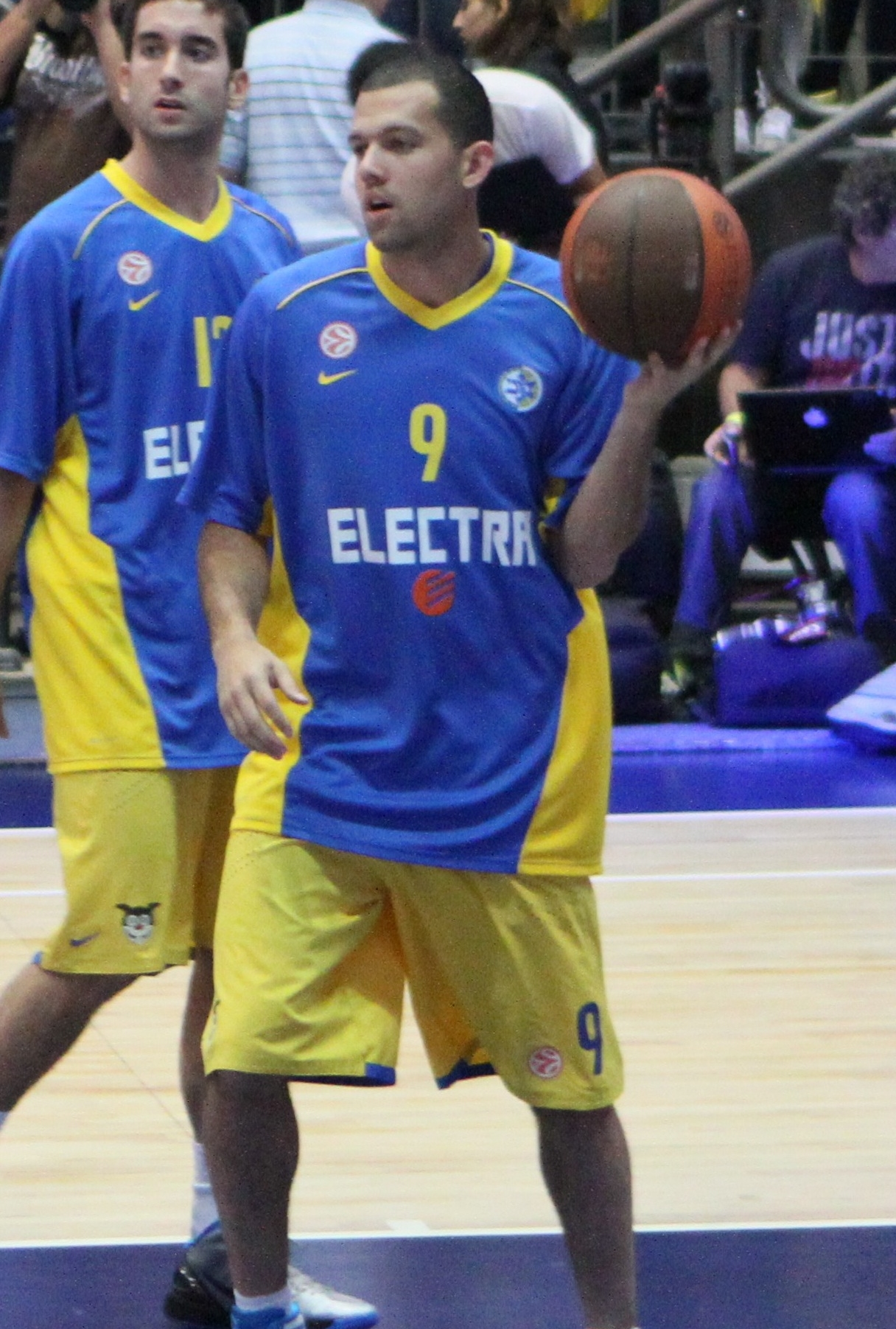
Jordan Farmar

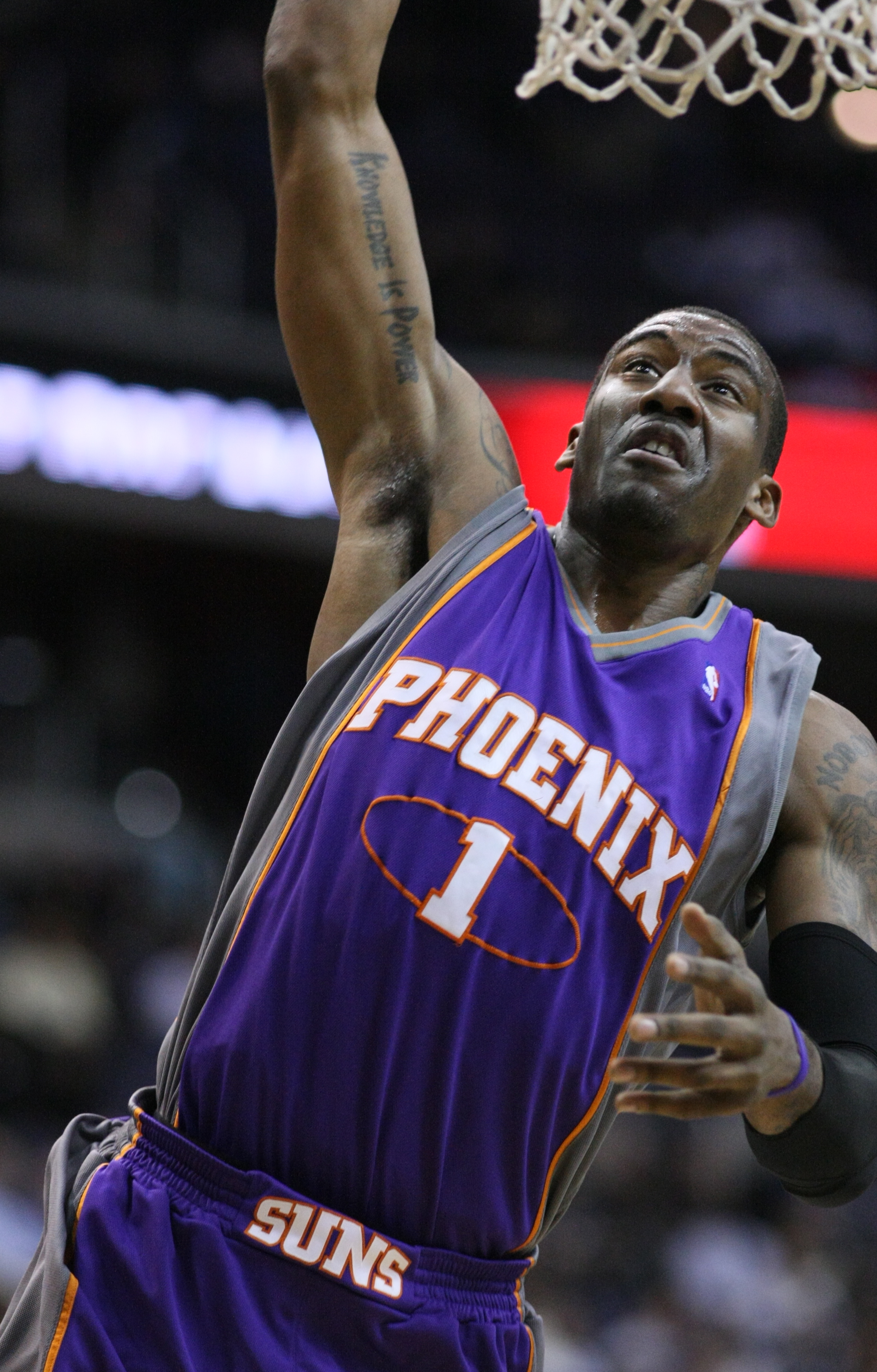
Amar'e Stoudemire

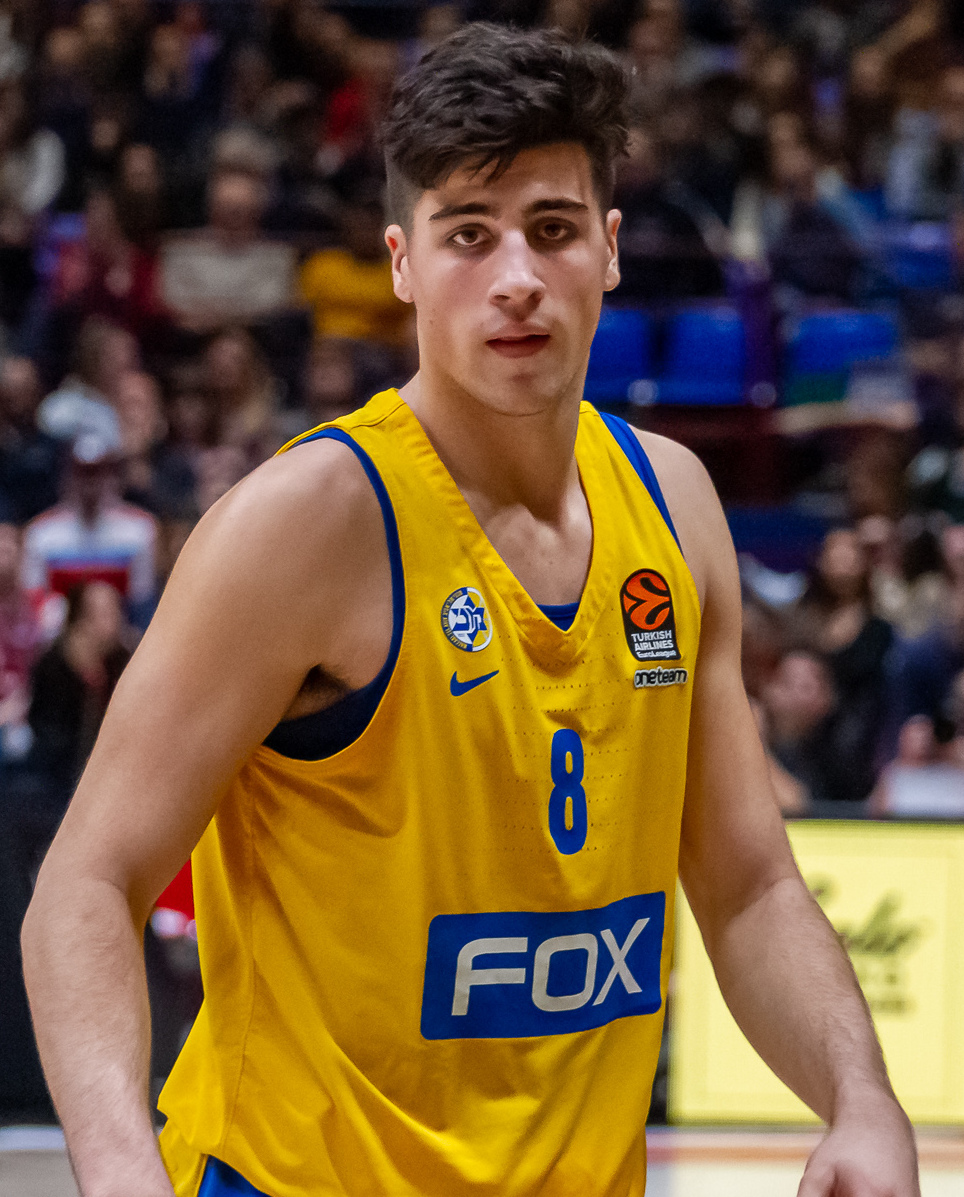
Deni Avdija

== High-profile American Jewish recruits ==
In 2011, the league imposed a limit of four non-Israelis per team. However, as all Jews are immediately eligible for Israeli citizenship under Israel's Law of Return, non-Israeli Jewish basketball players are able to join a team in the league without using up one of the few roster spots available for non-Israeli players.

Examples of Jewish Americans joining teams in the league include Jon Scheyer, Jordan Farmar, Sylven Landesberg, David Blu, Amar'e Stoudemire, and Dan Grunfeld.

== Current clubs ==
Teams of the 2026–27 Israeli Basketball Premier League

Team	City	Color
Bnei Herzliya	Herzliya	
Hapoel Be'er Sheva	Be'er Sheva	
Hapoel Galil Elyon	Upper Galilee	
Hapoel HaEmek	Gan Ner, Gilboa Regional Council	
Hapoel Holon	Holon	
Hapoel Ironi Eilat	Eilat	
Hapoel Jerusalem	Jerusalem	
Hapoel Tel Aviv	Tel Aviv	
Ironi Kiryat Ata	Kiryat Ata	
Ironi Nes Ziona	Ness Ziona	
Maccabi Ashdod	Ashdod	
Maccabi Ironi Ramat Gan	Ramat Gan	
Maccabi Rishon LeZion	Rishon LeZion	
Maccabi Tel Aviv	Tel Aviv	

== Titles by team ==
Team	Champions	Runner-Up
Maccabi Tel Aviv	58	7
Hapoel Tel Aviv	5	23
Hapoel Jerusalem	2	6
Hapoel Holon	2	3
Maccabi Haifa	1	3
Hapoel Galil Elyon	1	2
Maccabi Rishon LeZion	1	2
Hapoel Gilboa Galil	1	1
Hapoel Ramat Gan	0	6
Ironi Ramat Gan	0	3
Hapoel Gvat/Yagur	0	3
Hapoel Haifa	0	2
Hapoel Eilat	0	2
Bnei Herzliya	0	1
Elitzur Netanya	0	1
Maccabi Ironi Ra'anana	0	1
Ironi Nahariya	0	1
Maccabi Ashdod	0	1

== Title holders ==
- 1953–54 Maccabi Tel Aviv
- 1954–55 Maccabi Tel Aviv
- 1955–56 Not held due to Suez Crisis
- 1956–57 Maccabi Tel Aviv
- 1957–58 Maccabi Tel Aviv
- 1958–59 Maccabi Tel Aviv
- 1959–60 Hapoel Tel Aviv
- 1960–61 Hapoel Tel Aviv
- 1961–62 Maccabi Tel Aviv
- 1962–63 Maccabi Tel Aviv
- 1963–64 Maccabi Tel Aviv
- 1964–65 Hapoel Tel Aviv
- 1965–66 Hapoel Tel Aviv
- 1966–67 Maccabi Tel Aviv
- 1967–68 Maccabi Tel Aviv
- 1968–69 Hapoel Tel Aviv
- 1969–70 Maccabi Tel Aviv
- 1970–71 Maccabi Tel Aviv
- 1971–72 Maccabi Tel Aviv
- 1972–73 Maccabi Tel Aviv
- 1973–74 Maccabi Tel Aviv
- 1974–75 Maccabi Tel Aviv
- 1975–76 Maccabi Tel Aviv
- 1976–77 Maccabi Tel Aviv
- 1977–78 Maccabi Tel Aviv
- 1978–79 Maccabi Tel Aviv
- 1979–80 Maccabi Tel Aviv
- 1980–81 Maccabi Tel Aviv
- 1981–82 Maccabi Tel Aviv
- 1982–83 Maccabi Tel Aviv
- 1983–84 Maccabi Tel Aviv
- 1984–85 Maccabi Tel Aviv
- 1985–86 Maccabi Tel Aviv
- 1986–87 Maccabi Tel Aviv
- 1987–88 Maccabi Tel Aviv
- 1988–89 Maccabi Tel Aviv
- 1989–90 Maccabi Tel Aviv
- 1990–91 Maccabi Tel Aviv
- 1991–92 Maccabi Tel Aviv
- 1992–93 Hapoel Galil Elyon
- 1993–94 Maccabi Tel Aviv
- 1994–95 Maccabi Tel Aviv
- 1995–96 Maccabi Tel Aviv
- 1996–97 Maccabi Tel Aviv
- 1997–98 Maccabi Tel Aviv
- 1998–99 Maccabi Tel Aviv
- 1999–00 Maccabi Tel Aviv
- 2000–01 Maccabi Tel Aviv
- 2001–02 Maccabi Tel Aviv
- 2002–03 Maccabi Tel Aviv
- 2003–04 Maccabi Tel Aviv
- 2004–05 Maccabi Tel Aviv
- 2005–06 Maccabi Tel Aviv
- 2006–07 Maccabi Tel Aviv
- 2007–08 Hapoel Holon
- 2008–09 Maccabi Tel Aviv
- 2009–10 Hapoel Gilboa Galil
- 2010–11 Maccabi Tel Aviv
- 2011–12 Maccabi Tel Aviv
- 2012–13 Maccabi Haifa
- 2013–14 Maccabi Tel Aviv
- 2014–15 Hapoel Jerusalem
- 2015–16 Maccabi Rishon LeZion
- 2016–17 Hapoel Jerusalem
- 2017–18 Maccabi Tel Aviv
- 2018–19 Maccabi Tel Aviv
- 2019–20 Maccabi Tel Aviv
- 2020–21 Maccabi Tel Aviv
- 2021–22 Hapoel Holon
- 2022–23 Maccabi Tel Aviv
- 2023–24 Maccabi Tel Aviv
- 2024–25 No Title Holder due to Twelve-Day War
- 2025–26 Maccabi Tel Aviv

== Finals ==
Season	Champion	Runner-up	Score	Format
1953–54	Maccabi Tel Aviv	Hapoel Holon		Regular season only
1954–55	Maccabi Tel Aviv	Hapoel Holon		Regular season only
1955–56	Cancelled due to war			
1956–57	Maccabi Tel Aviv	Hapoel Tel Aviv		Regular season only
1957–58	Maccabi Tel Aviv	Hapoel Tel Aviv		Regular season only
1958–59	Maccabi Tel Aviv	Hapoel Tel Aviv		Regular season only
1959–60	Hapoel Tel Aviv	Maccabi Tel Aviv		Regular season only
1960–61	Hapoel Tel Aviv	Maccabi Tel Aviv		Regular season only
1961–62	Maccabi Tel Aviv	Hapoel Haifa		Regular season only
1962–63	Maccabi Tel Aviv	Hapoel Tel Aviv		Regular season only
1963–64	Maccabi Tel Aviv	Hapoel Tel Aviv		Regular season only
1964–65	Hapoel Tel Aviv	Maccabi Tel Aviv		Regular season only
1965–66	Hapoel Tel Aviv	Maccabi Tel Aviv		Regular season only
1966–67	Maccabi Tel Aviv	Hapoel Tel Aviv		Regular season only
1967–68	Maccabi Tel Aviv	Hapoel Tel Aviv		Regular season only
1968–69	Hapoel Tel Aviv	Maccabi Tel Aviv		Regular season only
1969–70	Maccabi Tel Aviv	Hapoel Tel Aviv		Regular season only
1970–71	Maccabi Tel Aviv	Hapoel Tel Aviv		Regular season only
1971–72	Maccabi Tel Aviv	Hapoel Gvat/Yagur		Regular season only
1972–73	Maccabi Tel Aviv	Ironi Ramat Gan		Regular season only
1973–74	Maccabi Tel Aviv	Ironi Ramat Gan		Regular season only
1974–75	Maccabi Tel Aviv	Hapoel Ramat Gan		Regular season only
1975–76	Maccabi Tel Aviv	Hapoel Gvat/Yagur		Regular season only
1976–77	Maccabi Tel Aviv	Hapoel Ramat Gan		Regular season only
1977–78	Maccabi Tel Aviv	Hapoel Gvat/Yagur		Mini-league of top six teams from regular season
1978–79	Maccabi Tel Aviv	Hapoel Tel Aviv	2:0	Best of 3 series
1979–80	Maccabi Tel Aviv	Hapoel Tel Aviv		Regular season only
1980–81	Maccabi Tel Aviv	Hapoel Ramat Gan		Regular season only
1981–82	Maccabi Tel Aviv	Hapoel Ramat Gan		Mini-league of top three teams from regular season
1982–83	Maccabi Tel Aviv	Hapoel Ramat Gan	2:0	Best of 3 series
1983–84	Maccabi Tel Aviv	Hapoel Ramat Gan	2:0	Best of 3 series
1984–85	Maccabi Tel Aviv	Hapoel Tel Aviv	2:1	Best of 3 series
1985–86	Maccabi Tel Aviv	Maccabi Elitzur Netanya	2:0	Best of 3 series
1986–87	Maccabi Tel Aviv	Hapoel Tel Aviv	2:1	Best of 3 series
1987–88	Maccabi Tel Aviv	Hapoel Tel Aviv	2:1	Best of 3 series
1988–89	Maccabi Tel Aviv	Hapoel Tel Aviv	2:0	Best of 3 series
1989–90	Maccabi Tel Aviv	Hapoel Galil Elyon	3:0	Best of 5 series
1990–91	Maccabi Tel Aviv	Maccabi Rishon LeZion	3:1	Best of 5 series
1991–92	Maccabi Tel Aviv	Hapoel Tel Aviv	3:2	Best of 5 series
1992–93	Hapoel Galil Elyon	Hapoel Tel Aviv	3:1	Best of 5 series
1993–94	Maccabi Tel Aviv	Hapoel Tel Aviv	3:0	Best of 5 series
1994–95	Maccabi Tel Aviv	Hapoel Galil Elyon	3:0	Best of 5 series
1995–96	Maccabi Tel Aviv	Hapoel Jerusalem	3:0	Best of 5 series
1996–97	Maccabi Tel Aviv	Hapoel Jerusalem	3:0	Best of 5 series
1997–98	Maccabi Tel Aviv	Hapoel Eilat	3:0	Best of 5 series
1998–99	Maccabi Tel Aviv	Hapoel Jerusalem	3:1	Best of 5 series
1999–00	Maccabi Tel Aviv	Maccabi Ra'anana	3:1	Best of 5 series
2000–01	Maccabi Tel Aviv	Hapoel Jerusalem	3:0	Best of 5 series
2001–02	Maccabi Tel Aviv	Ironi Ramat Gan	3:0	Best of 5 series
2002–03	Maccabi Tel Aviv	Ironi Naharia	3:0	Best of 5 series
2003–04	Maccabi Tel Aviv	Hapoel Tel Aviv	3:0	Best of 5 series
2004–05	Maccabi Tel Aviv	Hapoel Tel Aviv	3:0	Best of 5 series
2005–06	Maccabi Tel Aviv	Hapoel Jerusalem	96–66	Final Four format
2006–07	Maccabi Tel Aviv	Hapoel Jerusalem	80–78	Final Four format
2007–08	Hapoel Holon	Maccabi Tel Aviv	73–72	Final Four format
2008–09	Maccabi Tel Aviv	Maccabi Haifa	85–72	Final Four format
2009–10	Gilboa/Galil	Maccabi Tel Aviv	90–77	Final Four format
2010–11	Maccabi Tel Aviv	Gilboa/Galil	91–64	Final Four format
2011–12	Maccabi Tel Aviv	Maccabi Ashdod	83–63	Final Four format
2012–13	Maccabi Haifa	Maccabi Tel Aviv	86–79	Single game format
2013–14	Maccabi Tel Aviv	Maccabi Haifa	81–77; 82–84 OT	Home and Away format
2014–15	Hapoel Jerusalem	Hapoel Eilat	80–65; 88–68	Home and Away format
2015–16	Maccabi Rishon LeZion	Hapoel Jerusalem	83–77	Final Four format
2016–17	Hapoel Jerusalem	Maccabi Haifa	83–76	Final Four format
2017–18	Maccabi Tel Aviv	Hapoel Holon	95–75	Final Four format
2018–19	Maccabi Tel Aviv	Maccabi Rishon LeZion	89–75	Final Four format
2019–20	Maccabi Tel Aviv	Maccabi Rishon LeZion	86–81	Final Four format
2020–21	Maccabi Tel Aviv	Hapoel Gilboa Galil	2:1	Best of 3 series
2021–22	Hapoel Holon	Bnei Herzliya	2:0	Best of 3 series
2022–23	Maccabi Tel Aviv	Hapoel Tel Aviv	2:1	Best of 3 series
2023–24	Maccabi Tel Aviv	Hapoel Tel Aviv	2:1	Best of 3 series
2024–25	Cancelled due to war			
2025–26	Maccabi Tel Aviv	Hapoel Tel Aviv	3:1	Best of 5 series

== Awards ==
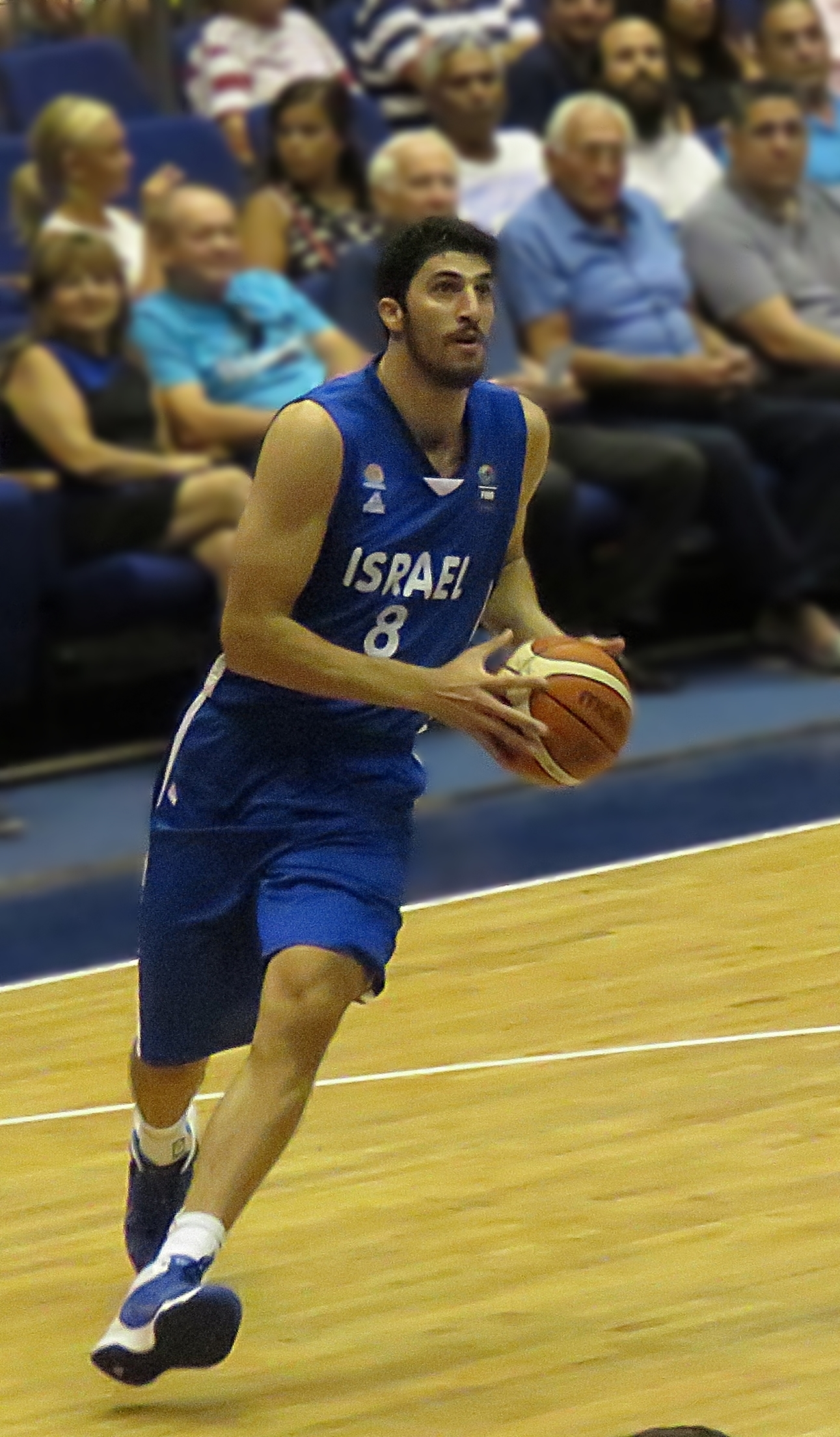
Lior Eliyahu, 2-time Israeli Basketball Premier League MVP

- Israeli Basketball Premier League MVP
- Israeli Basketball Premier League Finals MVP
- Israeli Basketball Premier League Quintet
- Israeli Basketball Premier League Defensive Player of the Year
- Israeli Basketball Premier League 6th Man of the Year
- Israeli Basketball Premier League Most Improved Player
- Israeli Basketball Premier League Discovery of the Year
- Israeli Basketball Premier League Coach of the Year

== See also ==
- Israel Basketball Association
- Israeli Basketball State Cup
- League Cup
- Liga Leumit
- Basketball in Israel
