= Lior Eliyahu =

Israeli basketball player (born 1985)

Lior Eliyahu לִיאוֹר אֱלִיָּהוּ
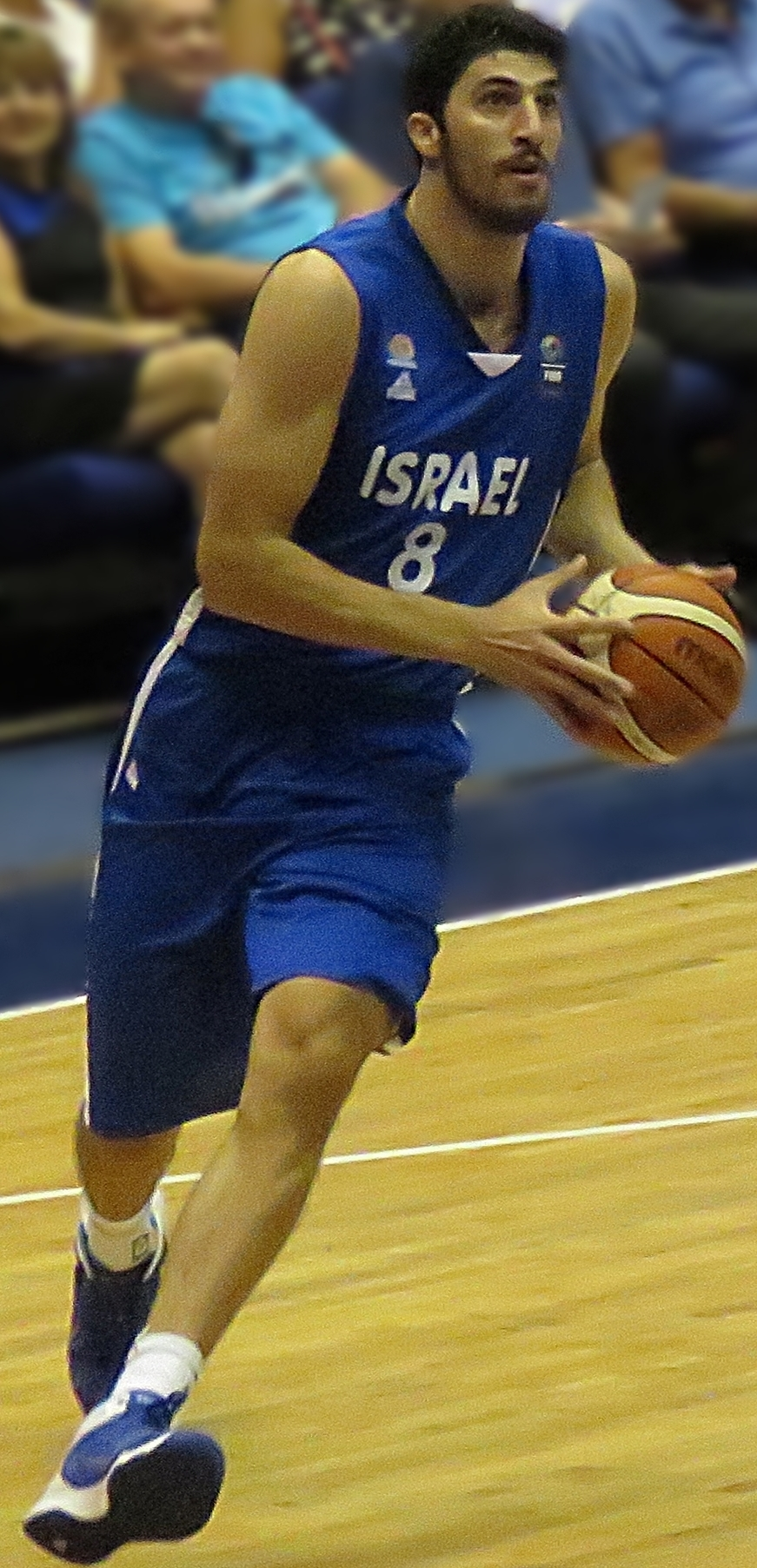
- Eliyahu playing for Israel in 2015

Personal information
- Born: 9 September 1985 (age 41) Ramat-Gan, Israel
- Listed height: 2.06 m (6 ft 9 in)
- Listed weight: 102 kg (225 lb)

Career information
- NBA draft: 2006: 2nd round, 44th overall pick
- Drafted by: Orlando Magic
- Playing career: 2003–2020
- Position: Power forward
- Number: 8

Career history
- 2003–2006: Hapoel Galil Elyon
- 2006–2009: Maccabi Tel Aviv
- 2009–2010: Caja Laboral
- 2010–2013: Maccabi Tel Aviv
- 2013–2019: Hapoel Jerusalem
- 2019–2020: Maccabi Ashdod

Career highlights
- 6× Israeli League champion (2007, 2009, 2011, 2012, 2015, 2017); 3× Israeli Cup winner (2011, 2012, 2019); 5× Israeli League Cup winner (2010–2014); 2× Israeli League MVP (2012, 2015); Israeli League Cup MVP (2011); 7× All-Israeli League First Team (2005, 2006, 2009, 2011, 2012, 2015, 2016); 7× Israeli League All-Star (2011–2017); Israeli League Rising Star (2004); Spanish League champion (2010); Adriatic League champion (2012); EuroLeague records since the 2000–01 season: Most 2-point field goals made in a game without a miss
- Stats at Basketball Reference

Lior Eliyahu (Hebrew: לִיאוֹר אֱלִיָּהוּ; born 9 September 1985) is an Israeli former professional basketball player. He is 2.06 m (6 ft 9 in) in height and he weighs 105 kg (225 pounds). He plays at the power forward position. He was named the 2012 and 2015 Israeli Basketball Premier League MVP.

== Early life ==
Eliyahu is Jewish, and was born in Ramat-Gan, Israel.

== Professional career ==
Eliyahu grew up in the youth system of Maccabi Ironi Ramat Gan, but moved to Galil for the 2004–05 season, in order to further his career. The move paid off when, under the guidance of Oded Katash, Eliyahu made great strides in improving his game. After the 2005–06 season, Eliyahu entered the 2006 NBA draft, a move criticized by Hanoch Mintz, Eliyahu's coach during his time in Ramat Gan.

In pre-draft camps in Europe, Eliyahu impressed along with fellow Israeli Yotam Halperin and when the camp was finished in Treviso, Italy, both had dramatically climbed the mock draft charts. He also impressed during matches between Maccabi Tel Aviv and NBA teams. During the EuroLeague 2006–07 season, Eliyahu averaged 10.8 points per game.

In December 2008, Eliyahu became the first Israeli to be named the EuroLeague MVP of the Month during the season. He recorded a double double in all three games he played during December. Overall for the 2008–09 EuroLeague season, Eliyahu averaged 14.0 points and 6.6 rebounds per game. In 2009, Eliyahu signed a 4-year contract worth €6 million euros net income with the Spanish League club Caja Laboral and he won the Spanish national championship with his new team in 2010, scoring 18 points in the deciding game against then EuroLeague champions Barcelona.

In September 2010, he returned to Maccabi Tel Aviv, signing a five-year contract. He was named the 2012 Israeli Basketball Premier League MVP.

In November 2013, he signed a three-year deal with Hapoel Jerusalem. In 2015, helped the club win its first-ever Israeli championship. He was named the 2015 Israeli Basketball Premier League MVP.

In 2017, Eliyahu took another championship with Hapoel Jerusalem. In January 2016, signed a three-year extension to his contract with Hapoel Jerusalem.

On 10 May 2018, Eliyahu recorded a career-high 15 assists, along with 10 points, 5 rebounds and 4 steals in a 92–73 win over Hapoel Eilat. He was subsequently named Israeli League Round 30 MVP.

On 23 August 2018, Eliyahu was named Hapoel Jerusalem's new team captain, replacing Yotam Halperin.

On 26 July 2019, Eliyahu signed with Maccabi Ashdod for the 2019–20 season, joining his former head coach Brad Greenberg. On 21 October 2019, Eliyahu recorded a season-high 22 points, shooting 10-of-15 from the field, along with seven rebounds and seven assists, leading Ashdod to an 83–76 win over Hapoel Tel Aviv. He was subsequently named Israeli League Round 3 MVP.

== NBA draft rights ==
On 28 June 2006, he made national headlines in Israel by being selected by the Orlando Magic with the 44th pick of the 2006 NBA draft. He was later traded to the Houston Rockets for cash considerations.

On 26 June 2012, the Minnesota Timberwolves traded the 18th overall pick of the 2012 NBA draft, to the Houston Rockets, in exchange for Chase Budinger and the draft rights to Eliyahu.

On 9 July 2019, his draft rights were traded to the Golden State Warriors in exchange for Treveon Graham and Shabazz Napier.

== Israel national team ==
Eliyahu was a member of the senior Israel national team at the 2007, 2009, 2011, 2013, 2015, and 2017 EuroBasket tournaments.

On 8 May 2018, Eliyahu announced his decision to retire from the Israel national team.

== Awards and accomplishments ==
- FIBA Europe Under-20 Championship: All Tournament Team (2005)
- EuroChallenge: All-Star (2006)

== Career statistics ==
Legend
GP	Games played	GS	Games started	MPG	Minutes per game
FG%	Field-goal percentage	3P%	3-point field-goal percentage	FT%	Free-throw percentage
RPG	Rebounds per game	APG	Assists per game	SPG	Steals per game
BPG	Blocks per game	PPG	Points per game	PIR	Performance index rating
**Bold**	Career high

*	Denotes seasons in which Eliyahu won a Championship
**Bold**	Denotes career highs

=== EuroLeague ===
Year	Team	GP	GS	MPG	FG%	3P%	FT%	RPG	APG	SPG	BPG	PPG	PIR
2006–07	Maccabi Tel Aviv	22	15	21.2	.575	.000	.653	5.3	1.3	**.9**	**.5**	10.8	13.1
2007–08	Maccabi Tel Aviv	18	5	10.1	.549	.000	.591	1.9	1.1	.4	.1	3.8	5.1
2008–09	Maccabi Tel Aviv	16	9	**26.5**	.624	.000	.667	**6.6**	**2.4**	.6	.3	**14.0**	**17.6**
2009–10	Caja Laboral	15	4	18.4	**.632**	.000	.400	3.4	1.3	.7	.3	8.4	11.1
2010–11	Maccabi Tel Aviv	21	**21**	20.3	.601	.200	.739	3.8	1.0	.8	**.5**	10.9	11.8
2011–12	Maccabi Tel Aviv	20	15	18.2	.566	**1.000**	.542	3.0	1.0	.3	.1	8.5	8.1
2012–13	Maccabi Tel Aviv	**23**	10	17.2	.483	.000	**.800**	3.1	2.1	.7	.2	7.3	8.2
Career		135	79	18.9	.568	.125	.650	4.0	1.3	.6	.3	9.1	10.6

=== EuroCup ===
Year	Team	GP	GS	MPG	FG%	3P%	FT%	RPG	APG	SPG	BPG	PPG	PIR
2013–14	Hapoel Jerusalem B.C.	15	**14**	25.2	.500	.000	.267	4.7	2.5	**.9**	**.5**	9.6	9.8
2014–15	Hapoel Jerusalem B.C.	10	10	**25.0**	**.515**	.000	.533	3.2	2.1	1	.4	**10.8**	9.2
2015–16	Hapoel Jerusalem B.C.	13	12	21.9	.485	.000	**.556**	**4.9**	**2.8**	.8	.2	10.5	**10.4**
2016–17	Hapoel Jerusalem B.C.	**19**	6	15.5	.513	.000	.545	3.5	1.9	.6	.2	6.9	7.8
Career		57	42	21.7	.502	0.000	.486	4.1	2.3	.8	.3	9.1	9.3

=== Domestic Leagues ===
Season	Team	League	GP	MPG	FG%	3P%	FT%	RPG	APG	SPG	BPG	PPG
2003-04	Galil-Elyon	Israel	22	13.5	.549	.500	.684	3.1	0.6	0.5	0.3	5.0
2004-05	Galil-Elyon	Israel	21	27.8	.591	.389	.670	5.2	1.7	**1.9**	0.3	13.9
2005-06	Galil-Elyon	Israel	29	26.6	.579	.294	.671	5.9	3.1	1.3	0.7	**15.9**
2006–07*	Maccabi T-A	Israel	26	16.9	.590	.286	.658	4.2	2.2	1.0	0.5	9.4
2007–08	Maccabi T-A	Israel	22	14.6	.595	.250	.656	3.7	2.1	0.7	0.2	7.2
2008–09*	Maccabi T-A	Israel	22	22.6	**.654**	.143	.633	4.7	3.1	1.0	0.4	13.2
2009–10*	Caja Laboral	Liga ACB	28	13.5	.508	.000	**.714**	1.7	1.0	0.5	0.4	5.3
2010–11*	Maccabi T-A	Israel	26	22.8	.637	.333	.674	5.0	2.9	1.0	0.7	13.6
2011–12*	Maccabi T-A	Israel	20	24.8	.610	.000	.595	5.1	3.3	1.2	0.3	13.8
2012–13	Maccabi T-A	Israel	25	23.2	.567	.500	.475	4.2	3.0	1.2	0.6	11.0
2013–14	Jerusalem	Israel	20	**31.3**	.569	.000	.482	5.7	3.4	1.6	0.7	13.4
2014–15*	Jerusalem	Israel	**33**	27.3	.547	**1.000**	.473	**6.5**	4.0	1.5	0.7	13.2
2015–16	Jerusalem	Israel	29	25.5	.511	.000	.391	6.2	**4.3**	0.8	0.7	11.7
2016–17*	Jerusalem	Israel	32	27.1	.492	.000	.326	5.6	3.4	1.1	0.7	9.8
Career			355	22.67	.563	.263	.578	4.77	2.72	1.09	0.51	11.17

== See also ==
- List of select Jewish basketball players
