= 2012 Israeli Final Four =

- Season: 2011–12 BSL season

Tournament details
- Arena: Yad Eliyahu Arena; Tel Aviv
- Dates: 22–24 May 2012

Final positions
- Champions: Maccabi Tel Aviv
- Runners-up: Maccabi Ashdod
- Third place: Hapoel Holon
- Fourth place: Maccabi Rishon LeZion

Awards and statistics
- MVP: (Israel) Meir Tapiro

The 2012 Israeli Final Four was the 7th Israeli Final Four tournament and the concluding tournament of the 2011–12 Israeli Basketball Super League. The event was held at Yad Eliyahu Arena, Tel Aviv, Israel on 22 and 24 May 2012 to determine the winner of the 2011–12 Israeli League. The Participating teams are: Maccabi Tel Aviv, Hapoel Holon, Maccabi Ashdod and Maccabi Rishon LeZion.

== Venue ==
The Yad Eliyahu Arena is an indoor sports arena in Tel Aviv, Israel. Opened in 1963 as an open-air venue with a capacity of 5,000, it was covered in 1972, and further renovations since then have brought its current capacity to 11,700. It had hosted the 1971–1972 FIBA European Champions Cup final, the 1993–94 FIBA European Championship Final Four, the 2003–2004 Euroleague Final Four, and all previous Israeli Final Fours.

== Results ==
=== Bracket ===
Semifinals; 24 May
Maccabi Tel Aviv	102
Hapoel Holon	73
Maccabi Rishon LeZion	68
Maccabi Ashdod	75

Final; 26 May
Maccabi Tel Aviv	83
Maccabi Ashdod	63
Third place
Hapoel Holon	72
Maccabi Rishon LeZion	67

=== Semifinals ===
==== Semifinal 1 ====
22 May 2012
18:15

Boxscore

Maccabi Tel Aviv	102–73	Hapoel Holon
Scoring by quarter: 30-14, 21-20, 24-22, 27-17
Pts: Smith 19; Rebs: Smith 8 Asts: Ohayon, Langford 4		Pts: Daniel 19; Rebs: Mitchell 6 Asts: Roth 6

Yad Eliyahu Arena, Tel Aviv
Attendance: 10,383

==== Semifinal 2 ====
22 May 2012

Boxscore

Maccabi Rishon LeZion	68–75	Maccabi Ashdod
Scoring by quarter: 19-13, 15-19, 17–28, 27-15
Pts: Kitchen 26; Rebs: Kitchen, Bowman 6 Asts: Kitchen 5		Pts: Carter, Bostein 16; Rebs: Tyus 15; Asts: Bostein 4

Yad Eliyahu Arena, Tel Aviv
Attendance: 10,383

=== Third-place playoff ===
24 May 2012

Boxscore

Hapoel Holon	72–67	Maccabi Rishon LeZion
Scoring by quarter: 16-14, 18-16, 18-19, 22-18
Pts: Mitchell 20; Rebs: Dunston 9 Asts: Shaashua 7		Pts: Hanochi 15; Rebs: Kitchen 7 Asts: Hanochi 6

Yad Eliyahu Arena, Tel Aviv
Attendance: 10,383

=== Final ===
24 May 2012

Boxscore

Maccabi Tel Aviv	83–63	Maccabi Ashdod
Scoring by quarter: 19-17, 25-16, 17-20, 22-10
Pts: Smith, Langford 16; Rebs: 4 players 5 Asts: Ohayon 10		Pts: Tyus 16; Rebs: Tyus, Duncan 9 Asts: Tapiro 3

Yad Eliyahu Arena, Tel Aviv
Attendance: 10,383
