= 2006–2007 Israeli Final Four =

The 2006–2007 Israeli Final Four (Israeli Basketball) the second Israeli Final Four was held at Yad Eliyahu Arena, Tel Aviv Israel on 29 and 31 May 2007 to determine the winner of the 2006–2007 Israeli League. The contestants were Maccabi Tel Aviv, the 2005–2006 Israeli League champion, Hapoel Jerusalem, the 2005–2006 Israeli League runner-up and the 2006–2007 Israeli State Cup winner, Bnei Hasharon, the 2006–2007 Israeli State Cup runner-up and Hapoel Galil Elyon.

Maccabi Tel Aviv won their 14th straight Israeli League crown, beating Hapoel Jerusalem 80-78 in the final. It was also their 47th overall Israeli title.

== Venue ==
The Yad Eliyahu Arena is an indoor sports arena in Tel Aviv, Israel. Opened in 1963 with its seating capacity varying from 5,000 to 11,700, it had hosted the 1971–1972 FIBA European Champions Cup final, the 1993–1994 FIBA European Championship Final Four, the 2003–2004 Euroleague Final Four and the 2005-2006 Israeli Final Four.

=== Bracket ===
Semifinals; 29 May
Hapoel Jerusalem	96
Bnei Hasharon	83
Maccabi Tel Aviv	93
Hapoel Galil Elyon	87

Final; 31 May
Maccabi Tel Aviv	80
Hapoel Jerusalem	78
Third place
Bnei Hasharon	80
Hapoel Galil Elyon	90

=== Semifinals ===
All times are in Israel Summer Time.

==== Semifinal 1 ====
29 May 2007
18:00

Hapoel Jerusalem	96–83	Bnei Hasharon
Scoring by quarter: 22–22, 30–19, 19–22, 25–20
Pts: Tapiro 22; Rebs: Austin 11; Asts: Bowers 7		Pts: Nailon 31; Rebs: Katz 11; Asts: Katz 6

Yad Eliyahu Arena, Tel Aviv
Attendance: 10,383

==== Semifinal 2 ====
29 May 2007
20:55

Maccabi Tel Aviv	93–87	Hapoel Galil Elyon
Scoring by quarter: 18–25, 28–23, 23–16, 24–23
Pts: Bynum 29; Rebs: Arnold 10; Asts: Halperin 4		Pts: Adelka 22; Rebs: Adelka 12; Asts: Ohayon 5

Yad Eliyahu Arena, Tel Aviv
Attendance: 10,383

==== Third-place playoff ====
31 May 2007
18:00

Bnei Hasharon	80–90	Hapoel Galil Elyon
Scoring by quarter: 19–26, 23–17, 21–20, 17–27
Pts: Williams 31; Rebs: Williams 6 Asts: Belcher, Katz 3		Pts: Simmons 29; Rebs: Adelka 9 Asts: Ohayon 5

Yad Eliyahu Arena, Tel Aviv
Attendance: 10,383

==== Final ====
31 May 2007
20:55

Maccabi Tel Aviv	80–78	Hapoel Jerusalem
Scoring by quarter: 17–24, 19–17, 18–22, 26–15
Pts: Bynum 18; Rebs: Vujčić 10; Asts: Bynum 5		Pts: Austin 16; Rebs: Morris 17; Asts: Tapiro 5

Yad Eliyahu Arena, Tel Aviv
Attendance: 10,383
