= Hapoel Gilboa/Afula =

Basketball club in Israel

Hapoel Afula (Hebrew: הפועל עפולה) was a basketball club in Israel. The club was formed by a merger of Hapoel Gilboa and Hapoel Afula.

The club played in the Israeli Basketball Super League until 2008 when it was relegated after finishing bottom in the 2007–08 season. In June 2008 it was announced that the club was to be disbanded; Hapoel Afula were re-established as an independent club and would play in the second tier, whilst Hapoel Gilboa would receive the top-division license of Hapoel Galil Elyon to form a new team, Hapoel Gilboa Galil.

== Notable players ==
- Boaz Janay (born 1952)
- Charles Lee (basketball) (born 1984)
- Doron Shefa (born 1961)
