= Jason Williams (basketball, born 1983) =

American professional basketball player (born 1983)

Personal information
- Born: November 17, 1983 (age 42) New Orleans, Louisiana, U.S.
- Listed height: 6 ft 6 in (1.98 m)
- Listed weight: 215 lb (98 kg)

Career information
- High school: Higgins (Marrero, Louisiana)
- College: Kilgore (2002–2003); UTEP (2003–2006)
- NBA draft: 2006: undrafted
- Playing career: 2006–2019
- Position: Small forward

Career history
- 2006–2008: Bnei HaSharon
- 2008–2009: Maccabi Tel Aviv
- 2009: Ironi Nahariya
- 2009–2010: Miro Radici Finance Vigevano
- 2010–2011: Snaidero Udine
- 2011: Domotecnica Ostuni
- 2011–2012: Bnei HaSharon
- 2012–2013: Estudiantes de Bahía Blanca
- 2013–2014: Halifax Rainmen
- 2014–2015: JA Vichy
- 2015–2016: JA Vichy-Clermont Métropole
- 2016–2017: Hapoel Be'er Sheva
- 2017–2019: Chorale Roanne

Jason Williams (born November 17, 1983) is an American professional basketball player. A 1.98 m (6 ft 6 in) forward, Williams last played for Chorale Roanne Basket of the LNB Pro B and has been a free agent since 2019. He formerly appeared at the Euroleague with the European powerhouse Maccabi Tel Aviv.

== College career ==
Williams played college basketball at the University of Texas at El Paso (UTEP). He helped the Miners to three straight postseason appearances and 72 wins during his three-year career at UTEP. He finished his career with 1,225 points, 614 rebounds and 300 assists. He was named to the Second Team All-Conference USA, the 2005 All-WAC Defense Team and the 2004 WAC All-Tournament Team.

On March 14, 2006, in the second-to-last game of his college career, Williams recorded the first triple-double in UTEP school history (also his first). He had 17 points, 11 rebounds and 10 assists in an NIT Tournament victory over Lipscomb.

== Professional career ==
He joined the Israeli League club Bnei HaSharon in 2006. In 2008, he joined the Israeli club Maccabi Tel Aviv. In 2009, he joined Ironi Nahariya.

On June 13, 2017, Williams joined the French club Roanne from LNB Pro B.

== Suspension ==
On December 7, 2005, Williams was suspended indefinitely by UTEP for breaking the jaw of freshman teammate Stefon Jackson with a sucker punch during a particularly physical practice. Since Williams was the team's best player, his suspension ended up being only one game when Jackson, his victim, urged coach Doc Sadler to reinstate Williams for the good of the team.
