= 2005–2006 Israeli Final Four =

The 2005–2006 Israeli Final Four , the first Israeli Final Four was held at Yad Eliyahu Arena, Tel Aviv, Israel on 6 and 8 June 2006 to determine the winner of the 2005–06 Israeli Basketball Super League. The contestants were Maccabi Tel Aviv, the 2004–2005 Israeli League champion and the 2005–2006 Israeli State Cup winner, Hapoel Jerusalem, the 2005–2006 Israeli State Cup runner-up, Maccabi Rishon Lezion and Ironi Naharia. Maccabi Tel Aviv won their 46th Israeli League crown, beating Hapoel Jerusalem 96-66 in the final.

== Venue ==
The Yad Eliyahu Arena is an indoor sports arena in Tel Aviv, Israel. Opened in 1963 with its seating capacity varying from 5,000 to 11,700, it had hosted the 1971–1972 FIBA European Champions Cup final, the 1993–1994 FIBA European Championship Final Four and the 2003–2004 Euroleague Final Four.

=== Bracket ===
Semifinals; 6 June
Maccabi Rishon Lezion	65
Hapoel Jerusalem	66
Maccabi Tel Aviv	85
Ironi Naharia	72

Final; 8 June
Maccabi Tel Aviv	96
Hapoel Jerusalem	66
Third place
Maccabi Rishon Lezion	87
Ironi Naharia	84

=== Semifinals ===
All times are in Israel Summer Time.

==== Semifinal 1 ====
6 June 2006
18:00

Recap

Maccabi Rishon Lezion	65–66	Hapoel Jerusalem
Scoring by quarter: 14–17, 11–15, 19–17, 21–17
Pts: Matthews 14; Rebs: Sidney, Sneed 9 Asts: Sidney 5		Pts: Slay 18; Rebs: Slay 14; Asts: Jenkins, Mason 3

Yad Eliyahu Arena, Tel Aviv
Attendance: 10,383

==== Semifinal 2 ====
6 June 2006
20:55

Recap

Maccabi Tel Aviv	85–72	Ironi Naharia
Scoring by quarter: 19–17, 27–22, 21–20, 18–13
Pts: Baston 18; Rebs: Baston 11; Asts: Vujčić, Parker 7		Pts: Young 16; Rebs: Hill, Wells 6 Asts: Sukar 2

Yad Eliyahu Arena, Tel Aviv
Attendance: 10,383

==== Third-place playoff ====
8 June 2006
18:00

Recap

Maccabi Rishon Lezion	87–84	Ironi Naharia
Scoring by quarter: 14-21, 25-20, 22-23, 26-20
Pts: John 23; Rebs: Sneed 8 Asts: John 4		Pts: Young 23; Rebs: Wells 11; Asts: Sukar 5

Yad Eliyahu Arena, Tel Aviv
Attendance: 10,383

==== Final ====
8 June 2006
20:55

Recap

Maccabi Tel Aviv	96–66	Hapoel Jerusalem
Scoring by quarter: 23–16, 22–19, 19–19, 32–12
Pts: Vujčić 20; Rebs: Shason 9 Asts: Parker 8		Pts: Slay 20; Rebs: Austin 7 Asts: Jenkins 4

Yad Eliyahu Arena, Tel Aviv
Attendance: 10,383

=== Awards ===
- Anthony Parker – Final MVP
