= Elitzur Giv'at Shmuel =

אליצור גבעת שמואל Elitzur Givat Shmuel
- Leagues: Liga Artzit
- Founded: 1991; 34 years ago
- Arena: Lider Center
- Location: Giv'at Shmuel, Israel
- Team colors: Blue and White
- Head coach: Tal Shalom
| Home | Away |

Elitzur Giv'at Shmuel (Hebrew: אליצור גבעת שמואל) is a basketball club, originally from Giv'at Shmuel in Israel. The club plays in the Liga Artzit, the third division of Israeli basketball. It played in the Israeli Basketball Premier League as recently as the 2008–2009 season.

The home hall of the club was the Leader Arena (1,400 seats) in Ganei Tikva.

== Notable players ==
- Set a club record or won an individual award as a professional player.
- Played at least one official international match for his senior national team at any time.

- (Israel) Dror Cohen
- Shimon Amsalem
- David Bernsley (born 1969), American-Israeli basketball player
- Paul Delaney (born 1986)

== See also ==
- Category:Maccabi Givat Shmuel players
