= Meir Tapiro =

Israeli basketball player

Meir Tapiro מאיר טפירו
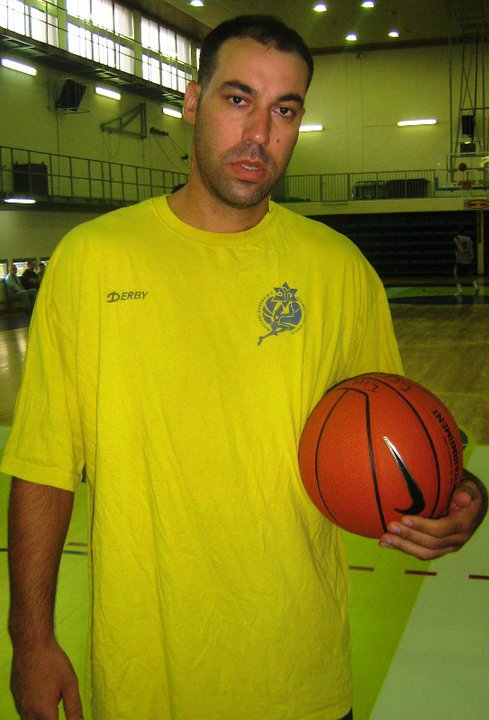

Ironi Nes Ziona
- Title: General manager
- League: Israeli Premier League

Personal information
- Born: March 28, 1975 (age 51) Kiryat Ata, Israel
- Listed height: 1.92 m (6 ft 4 in)
- Listed weight: 87 kg (192 lb)

Career information
- Playing career: 1994–2016
- Position: Point guard
- Coaching career: 2016–present

Career history

Playing
- 1993–1994: Maccabi Kiryat Motzkin
- 1994–1996: Hapoel Tel Aviv
- 1996–1998: Hapoel Eilat
- 1998–2000: Maccabi Haifa
- 2000–2003: Hapoel Jerusalem
- 2003–2004: Bnei Hasharon
- 2004–2005: SLUC Nancy
- 2005–2007: Hapoel Jerusalem
- 2007–2009: Bnei Hasharon
- 2009–2010: Maccabi Rishon LeZion
- 2010–2012: Maccabi Ashdod
- 2012–2013: Hapoel Jerusalem
- 2013–2015: Ironi Nes Ziona
- 2015–2016: Maccabi Kiryat Gat

Coaching
- 2016–2017: Maccabi Ashdod
- 2017: Hapoel Eilat

Career highlights
- Israeli League MVP (2002); Israeli League Playoffs MVP (2012); 3× All-Israeli League First Team (2002, 2004, 2008); 5× Israeli League Assists Leader (1998, 2004, 2006, 2010, 2014)

Meir Tapiro (Hebrew: מאיר טפירו; born March 28, 1975) is an Israeli former professional basketball player, and current CEO of Ironi Nes Ziona. Tapiro played at the point guard position. He was the 2002 Israeli Basketball Premier League MVP. He was a five-time Israeli Premier League Assists Leader, in 1998, 2004, 2006, 2010, and 2014.

He is of a Moroccan Jewish descent.

== Early years ==
Tapiro started playing basketball with the youth department of Elitzur Kiryat Ata.

== Professional career ==
Tapiro started his professional career at Maccabi Kiryat Motzkin. During his pro club career, Tapiro also played with Hapoel Tel Aviv, Hapoel Eilat, Hapoel Jerusalem, Bnei HaSharon, Nancy, Maccabi Rishon LeZion, and Maccabi Ashdod. He was the 2002 Israeli Basketball Premier League MVP. He was a five-time Israeli Premier League Assists Leader, in 1998, 2004, 2006, 2010, and 2014.

=== Triple doubles ===
Tapiro was the first Israeli player to achieve a Triple-double in the Israeli Super League. It happened during a game on February 1, 1999, when he finished the game with 16 points, 12 rebounds, and 10 assists, while playing with Maccabi Haifa. Tapiro was also the first Israeli player to achieve a triple-double in a European-wide game, as he led Hapoel Jerusalem to a 118–95 win over BC Odesa, in a EuroCup Challenge game in 2003. In total, Tapiro had 6 triple doubles throughout his career.

== Israeli national team ==
Tapiro also played with the senior Israeli National Team in every EuroBasket, from 1999 to 2007. He played at the EuroBasket 1999, the EuroBasket 2001, the EuroBasket 2003, the EuroBasket 2005, and the EuroBasket 2007. His best performance in a EuroBasket event was at EuroBasket 2001, where he averaged 13.3 points, 4.8 rebounds, and 3.5 assists per game.

On May 27, 2009, at the age of 34, Tapiro announced his immediate retirement from the Israeli national team, even though he was due to participate in the upcoming EuroBasket 2009. He cited his reasons for retirement from the national team as, his need to get rest, and to prepare himself physically and mentally for the next upcoming season.

== Honours ==
- Israeli State Cup
  - Winner: 2006–07

=== Regular season Statistics ===
The blocks have counted since 2001-02 season The minutes have counted since 1997-98 season

Year	Team	GP	GS	MPG	FG%	3P%	FT%	RPG	APG	SPG	BPG	PPG
1994–95	H.T.A	16	?	?	.56	.33	.64	1.7	1.9	.0	0	6.3
1995–96	H.T.A	20	?	?	.52	.38	.81	2.2	2.8	0	0	14.0
1996–97	Eilat	20	?	?	.51	.36	.85	2.2	1.6	0	0	9.3
1997–98	Eilat	21	?	?	.50	.28	.75	2.6	.7	0	0	11.8
1998–99	Haifa	22	?	34.7	.48	.34	.73	5.5	5.4	0	0	14.3
1999–2000	Haifa	20	?	35.6	.51	.34	.85	5.2	5.3	1.3	0	15
2000–01	Jerusalem	28	?	?	.48	.42	.70	2.6	2.5	1.1	0	8.1
2001–02	Jerusalem	26	24	27.7	.48	.34	.76	3.2	2.8	1.7	0	11.9
2002–03	Jerusalem	27	23	34.8	.56	.42	.86	4.7	4.4	1.7	0	17.2
2003–04	Bnei HaSharon	21	21	35.1	.46	.38	.73	4.2	7.3	1.9	0	13.5
2004–05	Nancy	33	18	24.06	.56	.236	.679	3.51	5.5	1	0.15	9.3
2005–06	Jerusalem	30	6	27.1	.48	.42	.81	3.9	5.4	1.5	0	10.6
2006–07	Jerusalem	27	26	27.2	.44	.38	.82	3.1	4	1.3	0	10.9
2007–08	Bnei HaSharon	24	22	34	.49	.36	.82	5.3	5.5	1.4	0	13.6
2008–09	Bnei HaSharon	22	21	31.9	.48	.35	.71	4.8	5.6	1.1	0	12.4
2009–10	Rishon	22	9	28.7	.42	.34	.83	4.6	6.5	1.2	0.1	9.6
2010–11	Ashdod	27	27	32.6	.45	.33	.85	5.1	6.1	2.2	0.1	11.6
2011–12	Ashdod	24	24	30.8	.45	.22	.87	4.6	7.4	1.5	0	9
2012–13	Jerusalem	26	4	20.2	.45	.27	.85	2.6	3.5	.8	0	6.2
2013–14	Nes Ziona	29	29	33.1	.43	.32	.91	4.3	6.6	1.5	0	9.7
2014–15	Nes Ziona	26	19	25	.50	.37	.75	3.5	5.2	1.3	.2	8
2015–16	Kiryat Gat	32	8	21	.48	.28	.86	3.6	4.0	1.0	0	6.5
