= Hapoel Jerusalem =

Hapoel movement

- Full name: Hapoel Jerusalem Sport Club הפועל ירושלים
- Founded: 1920
- Colors

Hapoel Jerusalem is a sport organization in Jerusalem as a local branch of the Hapoel movement. The branch was established in the 1920s and represents the city in more sports than any other sport organization in Jerusalem. Today, the club's leading sport clubs participate in basketball, association football, swimming, and futsal.

== Clubs ==
=== Hapoel Jerusalem Football Club ===
Hapoel Jerusalem F.C. was established in the 1920s and for many years was the leading club in Jerusalem. Their home pitch has changed through the years from a modest field in Katamon to the sandbox of YMCA Stadium to Teddy Stadium. The club's greatest achievement was winning the Israel State Cup in 1973, one year after they finished runners up.

During the 1980s and 1990s, the club lost its stature as Jerusalem's leading club to city rivals, Beitar.

=== Hapoel Jerusalem Basketball Club ===
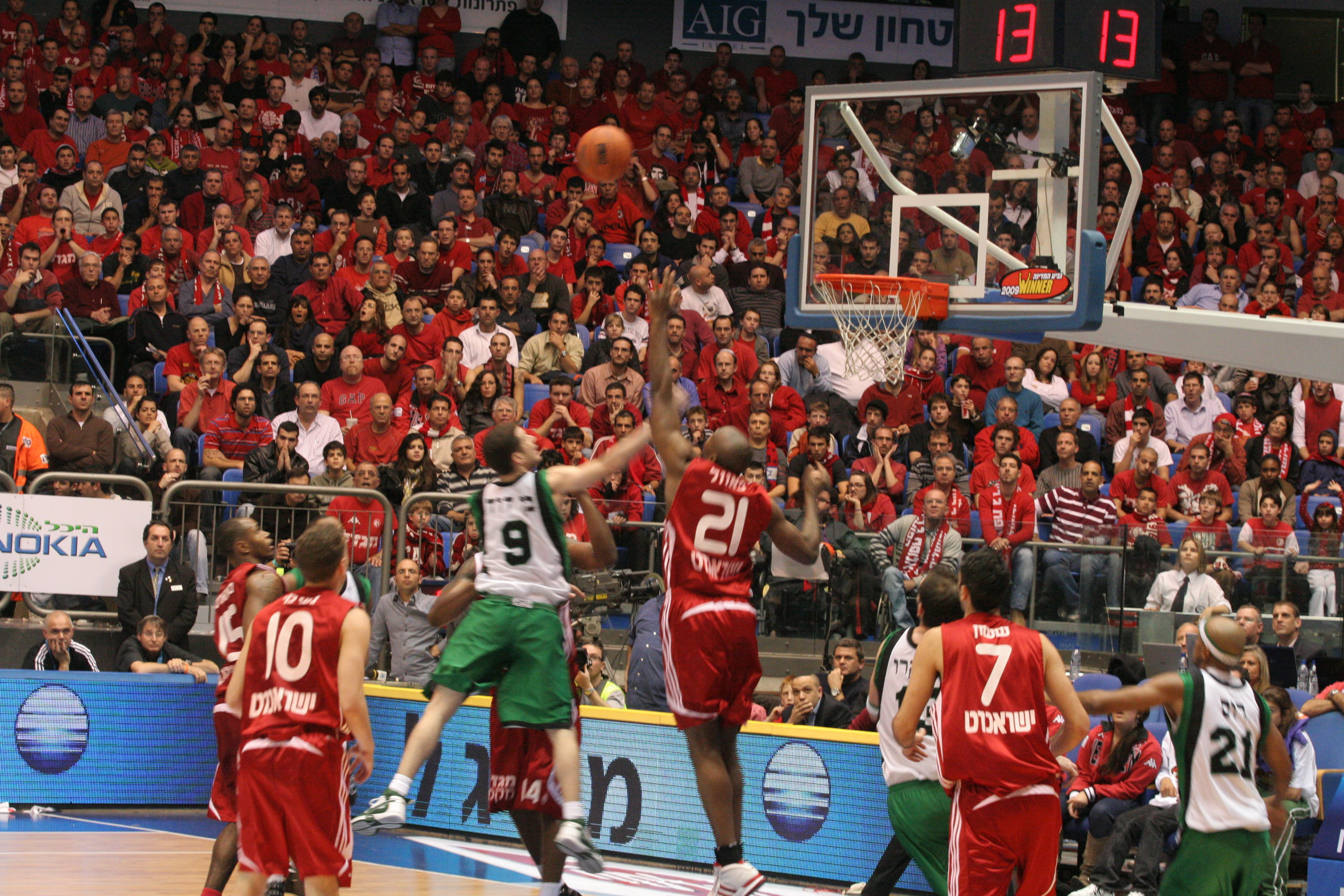
Hapoel Jerusalem basketball team

Hapoel Jerusalem B.C. is considered the second biggest club in Israel after European super power, Maccabi Tel Aviv. Jerusalem has won two League Championships (in 2015 and 2017) and has been league runner up five times. It has also won five Cups, and the pre-season Winner Cup tournament four times. The club's greatest achievement was winning the ULEB Cup in 2004, the second highest title in Europe.

=== Hapoel Jerusalem Futsal Club ===
Run by the Peres Center for Peace, the Hapoel Jerusalem Futsal Club is one of the strongest futsal teams in Israel.

=== Hapoel Jerusalem Handball Club ===
Hapoel Jerusalem Handball Club was founded in 2021.

=== Hapoel Jerusalem Swim Club ===
Hapoel Jerusalem swimming association was established in 1988 to promote water sports in Jerusalem and the vicinity. The leading team is Hapoel-Jerusalem Swim. In 1991, Hapoel won the national championship for the first time. Since then, it has won the championship 19 times, establishing itself as a leader in Israeli swimming. Since 2002, Hapoel Jerusalem has held the Israeli championship in the Triathlon competition. In 2006, it renewed its activity in water polo with the establishment of a youth swimmers club. The club is also a national leader in synchronized swimming. Hapoel Jerusalem takes part in national and international competitions, and its swimmers have represented Israel in the Olympics, European championships and the Comen Games.

== Notable members ==
- Guy Barnea, Olympic swimmer
- Tomer Frankel, swimmer, two-time European junior champion

== See also ==
- Sport in Israel
