= 2010–2011 Israeli Final Four =

2011 Israeli Final Four
- Season: 2010–2011 Israeli Super League

Tournament details
- Arena: Yad Eliyahu Arena; Tel Aviv
- Dates: 24–26 May 2011

Final positions
- Champions: Maccabi Tel Aviv (49th title)
- Runners-up: Hapoel Gilboa Galil
- Third place: Hapoel Jerusalem
- Fourth place: Maccabi Rishon LeZion

Awards and statistics
- MVP: (Israel) David Blu

The 2010–2011 Israeli Final Four, the sixth Israeli Final Four was held at Yad Eliyahu Arena, Tel Aviv, Israel on 24 and 26 May 2011 to determine the winner of the 2010–2011 Israeli League. The Participating teams are: Maccabi Tel Aviv, Hapoel Gilboa Galil, Hapoel Jerusalem and Maccabi Rishon LeZion.

== Venue ==
The Yad Eliyahu Arena is an indoor sports arena in Tel Aviv, Israel. Opened in 1963 as an open-air venue with a capacity of 5,000, it was covered in 1972, and further renovations since then have brought its current capacity to 11,700. It had hosted the 1971–1972 FIBA European Champions Cup final, the 1993–94 FIBA European Championship Final Four, the 2003–2004 Euroleague Final Four, and all previous Israeli Final Fours.

== MVP ==
Semifinal 1 - Jeremy Pargo
Semifinal 2 - Gal Mekel
Final Four MVP - David Blu

== Results ==
=== Bracket ===
Semifinals; 24 May
Maccabi Tel Aviv	100
Maccabi Rishon LeZion	77
Hapoel Gilboa Galil	98
Hapoel Jerusalem	80

Final; 26 May
Maccabi Tel Aviv	91
Hapoel Gilboa Galil	64
Third place
Hapoel Jerusalem	94
Maccabi Rishon LeZion	74

=== Semifinals ===
All times are in Israel Summer Time.

==== Semifinal 1 ====
24 May 2011
18:15

Maccabi Tel Aviv	100–77	Maccabi Rishon LeZion
Scoring by quarter: 32-13, 19-15, 28-24, 21-25
Pts: Pargo 17; Rebs: Pargo, Eidson 6 Asts: Burstein 6		Pts: Morgan 22; Rebs: Mitchell 13; Asts: Shulman 5

Yad Eliyahu Arena, Tel Aviv
Attendance: 10,383

==== Semifinal 2 ====
24 May 2011
21:00

Hapoel Gilboa Galil	98–80	Hapoel Jerusalem
Scoring by quarter: 26-19, 16-27, 35-17, 21-17
Pts: Killingsworth 19; Rebs: Carter 7 Asts: Mekel 7		Pts: Ohayon 13; Rebs: Dowell 10; Asts: Ohayon 4

Yad Eliyahu Arena, Tel Aviv
Attendance: 10,383

=== Third-place playoff ===
26 May 2011
18:00

Hapoel Jerusalem	94–74	Maccabi Rishon LeZion
Scoring by quarter: 18-23, 27-14, 18-19, 31-18
Pts: Naimy 24; Rebs: Clancy, Dowell 8 Asts: Rich, Solomon 4		Pts: Hanochi 26; Rebs: McGhee 11; Asts: McGhee, Shulman 4

Yad Eliyahu Arena, Tel Aviv
Attendance: 10,383

=== Final ===
26 May 2011
21:00

Maccabi Tel Aviv	91–64	Hapoel Gilboa Galil
Scoring by quarter: 24-13, 23-22, 20-14, 24-15
Pts: Blu 19; Rebs: Hendrix 7 Asts: Pargo 10		Pts: Fells 25; Rebs: Killingsworth 5 Asts: Israeli 8

Yad Eliyahu Arena, Tel Aviv
Attendance: 10,383
