= Israeli Basketball All-Star Game =

- Status: Inactive
- Frequency: Annually
- Inaugurated: 1990s
- Most recent: 2022
- Organizer: Israeli League

The Israeli Basketball All-Star Game is an annual basketball event in Israel. The event was first played in the 1990s and it returned in the 2010-11 season after a lengthy hiatus. The All-Star Game includes a match between a selection of the best players of the Israeli League, a slam-dunk and a three-point contest. The rosters for the All-Star Game are chosen by an online voting, with fans choosing one international player and one local player from each team. It is organized by the Israeli Basketball Premier League.

== List of games ==
Bold: Team that won the game.

Year	Date	Venue	Team	Score	Team	MVP
1999		Jerusalem	Group A	n/a	Group B	(United States) Nate Huffman
2001	January 1	Haifa Romema Arena	Group A	n/a	Group B	
2003			Group A	n/a	Group B	
2011	February 28	Gan Ner Sports Hall	**Israeli All Stars**	**122**-117	Foreign All Stars	(Israel) Lior Eliyahu
2012	March 9	Ashkelon Sports Arena	**Israeli All Stars**	**113**-109	Foreign All Stars	(Israel) Elishay Kadir
2013	March 18	Haifa Romema Arena	**Israeli All Stars**	**127**-111	Foreign All Stars	
2014	February 25	Beer-Sheva Arena	Israeli All Stars	103-**111**	**Rest of the World**	(United States) Shannon Shorter
2015	March 3	Holon Toto Hall	**Israeli All Stars**	**122**-121 (OT)	World All Stars	(Bosnia and Herzegovina) (United States) (Israel) Robert Rothbart
2016	March 26	Eilat Begin Arena	**Israeli All Stars**	**143**-117	Foreign All Stars	(Israel) Meir Tapiro
2017	April 18	Menora Mivtachim Arena	Israeli All Stars	129-**137**	**Rest of the World**	(United States) (Israel) Amare Stoudemire
2018	March 2	Menora Mivtachim Arena	**Israeli All Stars**	**137**-122	Rest of the World	(United States) Pierre Jackson
2019	April 12	Menora Mivtachim Arena	Israeli All Stars	130-**134**	**Rest of the World**	(Cameroon) JP Tokoto
2020-2021	Cancelled due to the pandemic					
2022	March 19		**Team J'Covan Brown**	**133**-123	Team Guy Pnini	(United States) (Nigeria) Ike Iroegbu

== Three-Point Shoot Contest ==
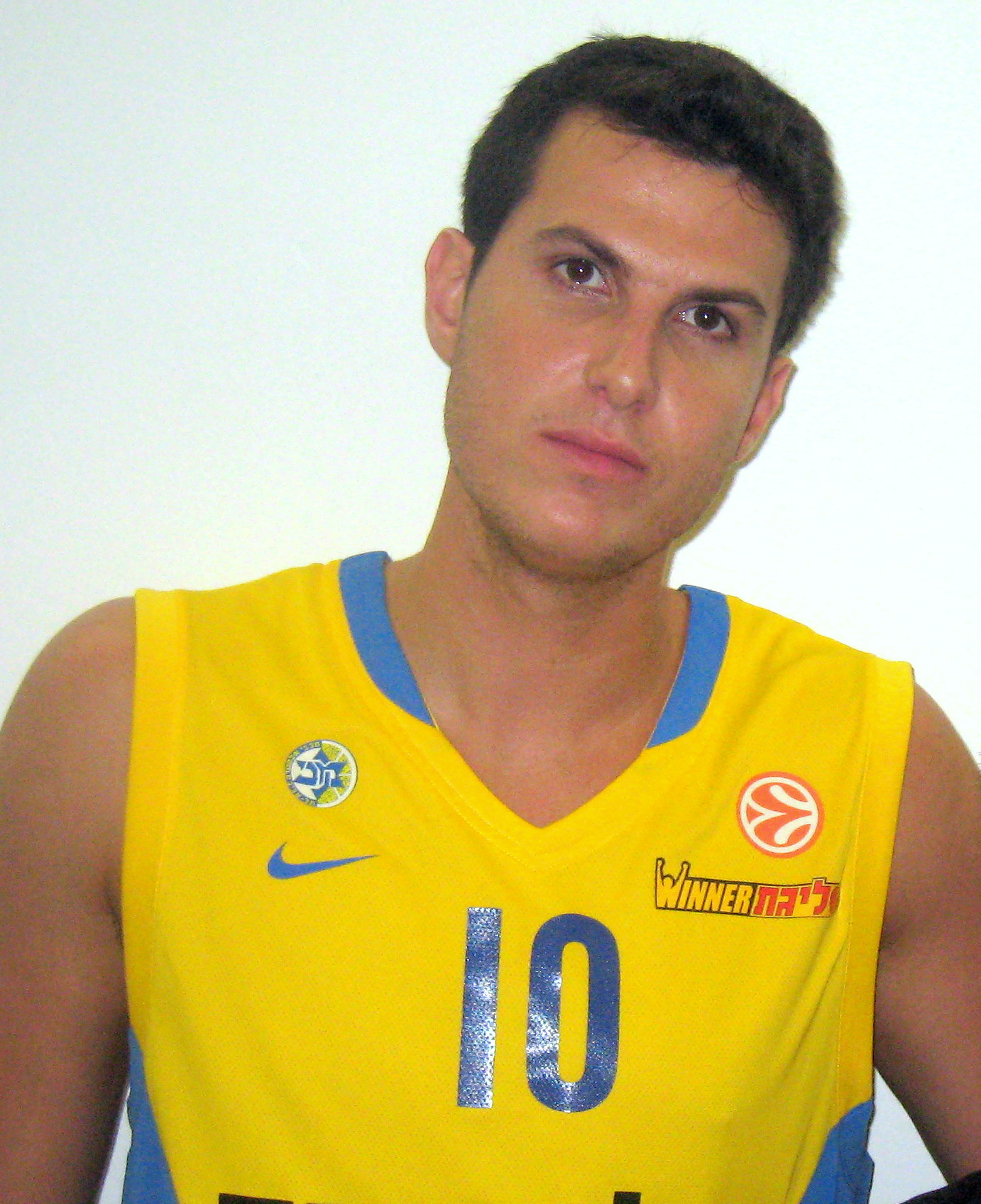
Guy Pnini

Year	Winner	Team
2011	(United States) Jack McClinton	Hapoel Gilboa Galil
2012	(Israel) Amit Simhon	Ironi Ashkelon
2013	(United States) (Mexico) Paul Stoll	Maccabi Haifa
2014	(United States) Zack Rosen	Maccabi Ashod
2015	(United States) Zack Rosen (2)	Maccabi Ashod
2016	(United States) Isaiah Swann	Maccabi Ashod
2017	(United States) (Mexico) Orlando Méndez-Valdez	Maccabi Haifa
2018	(Israel) Guy Pnini	Hapoel Holon
2019	(Israel) Guy Pnini	Hapoel Holon
2022	(Israel) Guy Pnini (3)	Hapoel Holon

== Slam-Dunk Contest ==
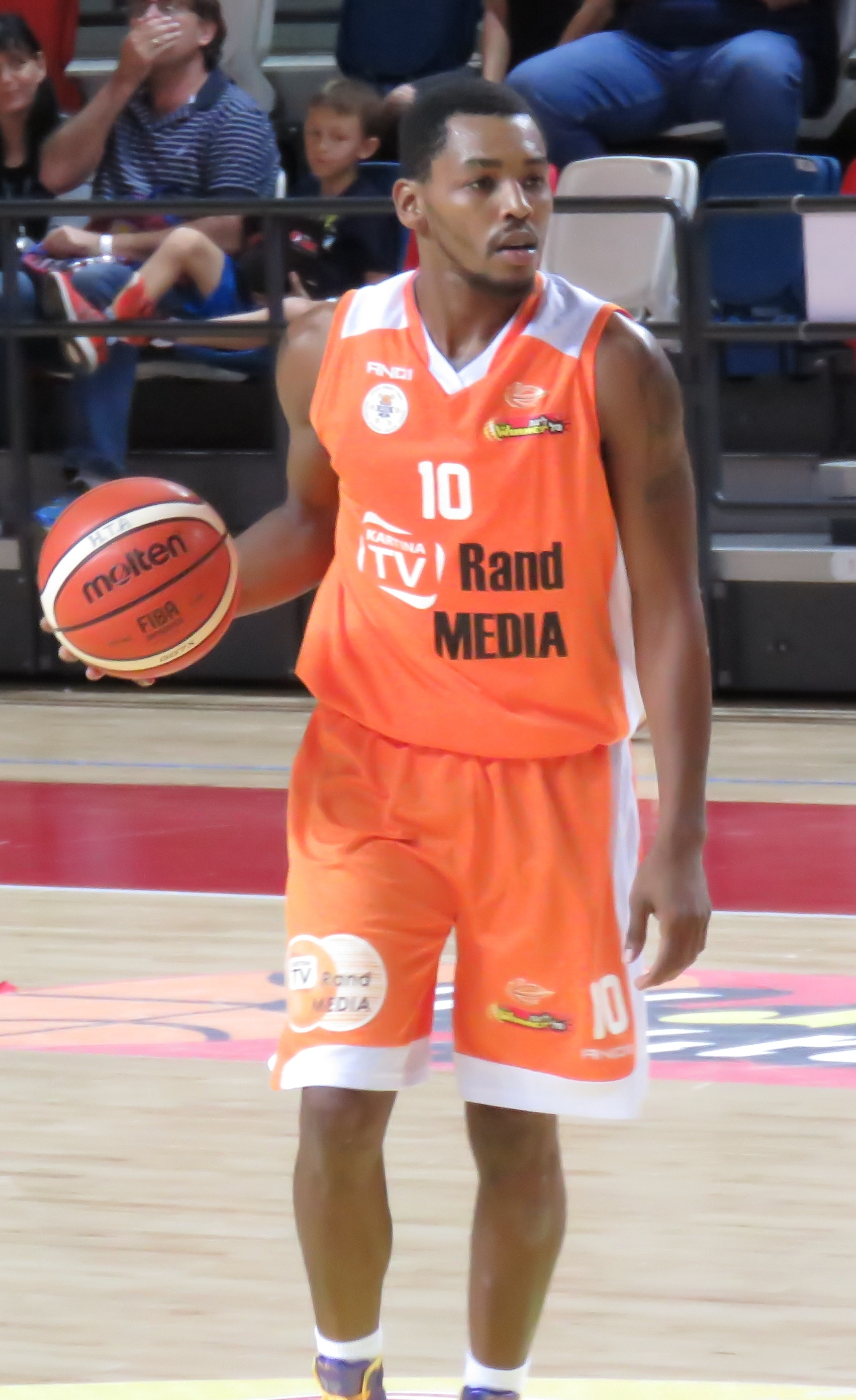
Mark Lyons slam-dunk winner in 2015.

Year	Winner	Team
2011	(United States) Jeremy Pargo & (United States) Adrian Banks (shared)	Maccabi Tel Aviv; Barak Netanya
2012	(Israel) Roi Buchbinder	Bnei Hasharon
2013	(United States) Scotty Hopson	Hapoel Eilat
2014	(Israel) Itay Segev	Hapoel Holon
2015	(United States) Mark Lyons	Ironi Nahariya
2016	(United States) Gilbert Brown	Ironi Nahariya
2017	(United States) Eric Griffin	Hapoel Gilboa Galil
2018	(United States) Jaron Johnson	Ironi Nes Ziona
2019	(United States) Cor-J. Cox	Maccabi Ashod
2022	(Cameroon) JP Tokoto	Hapoel Tel Aviv

== Players with most appearances (1999-present) ==
Player	All-Star	Editions	Notes
(Israel) Lior Eliyahu	7	2011, 2012, 2013, 2014, 2015, 2016, 2017	1x MVP (2011)
(Israel) Meir Tapiro	6	2011, 2012, 2013, 2014, 2015, 2016	1x MVP (2016)
(Israel) Elishay Kadir	5	2011, 2012, 2015, 2016, 2018	1x MVP (2012)
(United States) (Israel) Shawn Dawson	5	2014, 2015, 2016, 2017, 2018	
(Israel) Shlomi Harush	5	2013, 2014, 2015, 2016, 2017	
(United States) (Venezuela) Donta Smith	4	2013, 2014, 2015, 2016	
(Israel) Gal Mekel	4	2011, 2013, 2016, 2017	
(Israel) Afik Nissim	4	2013, 2014, 2016, 2017	
(United States) (Israel) Isaac Rosefelt	4	2012, 2014, 2015, 2016	
(Israel) Guy Pnini	4	2011, 2013, 2019, 2022	3x Three-Point Winner
(Israel) Tamir Blatt	3	2017, 2018, 2019	
(United States) Marco Killingsworth	3	2011, 2012, 2016	
(United States) (Israel) Adrian Banks	3	2011, 2012, 2018	
(United States) Nate Huffman	2	1999, 2001	1x MVP (1999)
(Israel) Tal Burstein	2	2001, 2003	
(Israel) Afik Nissim	2	2001, 2003	

== Score sheets ==
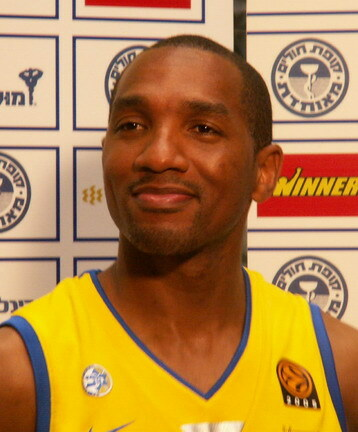
Derrick Sharp

- All-Star Game 2001:

DATE:1 January 2001
VENUE: Romema Arena, Haifa
SCORE: Group A - Group B ?

Group A: Tal Burstein, Ariel McDonald, Nate Huffman, Nadav Henefeld, Derrick Sharp, Anthony Parker (all Maccabi Tel Aviv players), Yariv Yatzkan, Andre Spencer (both Ironi Ramat Gan players), Amir Muchtary (from Haifa B.C), Itzik Ochanon (from Bney Herzelia).

Group B: Lamont Jones, Yoav Saffar, Rimas Kaukenas (all Hapoel Galil Elyon players), Papi Turgeman, Kebo Stewart, Tony Dorsey (all Hapoel Jerusalem players), Guy Kantor, Yaniv Green (both Maccabi Raaanana players), Afik Nissim (from Maccabi Rishon LeZion), Tomer Steinhour (from Maccabi Givat Shmuel).
