= 2011 BSL All-Star Game =

Basketball game

	1	2	3	4	Total
International All-Stars	32	29	27	29	117
Israeli All-Stars	40	27	29	26	122
- Date: 11 January 2011
- Arena: Gan Ner Sports Hall
- City: Gan Ner
- MVP: Lior Eliyahu
- Attendance: 2,800

NBA All-Star Game

The 2011 BSL All-Star Game was an exhibition basketball game that was played on 11 January 2011 at Gan Ner Sports Hall, home of Hapoel Gilboa Galil. The game was played during the 2010–11 BSL Season.

== All-Star Game ==
The BSL League Administration announced the re-establishment of the BSL All-Star Game On 8 December 2010. The rosters for the All-Star Game were chosen by an online voting, In which the fans choose one international player and one local player from each team. The voting was open for three weeks, until 27 December. After counting approximately 10,000 votes the following rosters has been chosen.

=== Roster ===
Israeli All-Stars
Pos.	Player	Team
Starters
G	(Israel) Meir Tapiro	Maccabi Ashdod
G	(Israel) Dror Hajaj	Ironi Ashkelon
F	(Israel) Guy Pnini	Maccabi Tel Aviv
F	(Israel) Lior Eliyahu	Maccabi Tel Aviv
C	(Israel) Ido Kozikaro	Hapoel Gilboa Galil
Bench
G	(Israel) Shmulik Brener	Barak Netanya
G	(Israel) Erez Katz	Bnei HaSharon
C	(Israel) (United States) Chris Watson	Barak Netanya
G	(Israel) Gal Mekel	Hapoel Gilboa Galil
G	(Israel) Yehu Orland	Maccabi Rishon LeZion
F/C	(Israel) Lior Hakmon	Hapoel Jerusalem
F	(Israel) Elishay Kadir	Maccabi Haifa
Head coach: Oded Kattash (Hapoel Jerusalem); Effi Birnbaum (Maccabi Rishon LeZion)

International All-Stars
Pos.	Player	Team
Starters
G	(United States) Ramel Bradley	Maccabi Ashdod
G	(United States) Will Solomon	Hapoel Jerusalem
G	(United States) Jack McClinton	Hapoel Gilboa Galil
C	(United States) Shawn James	Bnei HaSharon
C	(Greece) Sofoklis Schortsanitis	Maccabi Tel Aviv
Bench
F	(United States) Lee Nailon	Bnei HaSharon
F	(United States) Rodney Green	Hapoel Gilboa Galil
F	(United States) Richard Melzer	Hapoel Holon
F	(United States) Rahshon Turner	Ironi Ashkelon
G	(United States) Jason Rich	Hapoel Jerusalem
F	(United States) Aaron McGhee	Maccabi Rishon LeZion
G	(United States) Adrian Banks	Barak Netanya
F/C	(United States) Marco Killingsworth	Maccabi Hafia
Head coach: David Blatt (Maccabi Tel Aviv); Dan Shamir (Bnei HaSharon)

=== Game ===
Sport 5

11 January
19:30

Report

Israeli All-Stars 122, International All-Stars 117
Scoring by quarter: 40-32, 27-29, 29-27, 26-29
Pts: Eliyahu 27	Pts: Bradley 26

Gan Ner Sports Hall, Gan Ner
Attendance: 2,057

Lior Eliyahu was named MVP of the match as he scored 27 points and passed 13 assists.

== Three-point shootout ==
Contestants
Pos.	Player	Team	First round	Final round
G	(United States) Jack McClinton	Hapoel Gilboa Galil	17	21
F	(United States) (Israel) David Blu	Maccabi Tel Aviv	16	18
G	(Israel) Dagan Yivzori	Hapoel Gilboa Galil	15	—
F	(United States) Josh Carter	Maccabi Ashdod	11	—
G	(United States) Frank Robinson	Maccabi Haifa	10	—
G	(Israel) Yehu Orland	Maccabi Rishon LeZion	10	—

== Slam Dunk Contest ==
Contestants
Pos.	Player	Team
G	(United States) Robert Hite	Hapoel Holon
G	(United States) Jeremy Pargo	Maccabi Tel Aviv
G	(United States) Adrian Banks	Barak Netanya
F	(United States) Tyler Wilkerson	Hapoel Gilboa Galil
