= Adam Ariel =

Israeli basketball player (born 1994)

Adam Ariel אדם אריאל
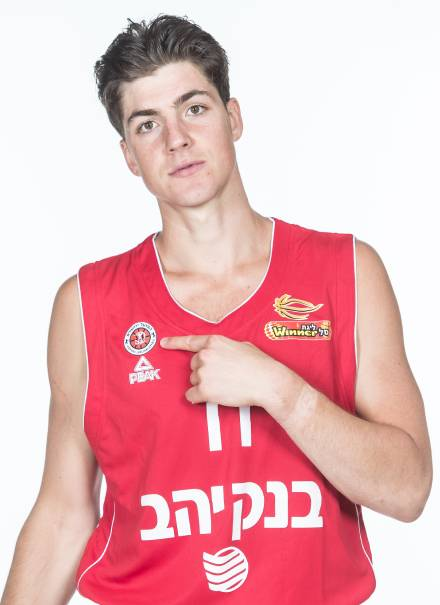
- Ariel with Hapoel Jerusalem in 2020

No. 11 – Ironi Ness Ziona
- Position: Shooting guard / small forward
- League: Israeli Basketball Premier League

Personal information
- Born: December 10, 1994 (age 31) Jerusalem, Israel
- Listed height: 1.95 m (6 ft 5 in)

Career information
- NBA draft: 2016: undrafted
- Playing career: 2012–present

Career history
- 2012–2015: Hapoel Jerusalem
- 2015–2016: Eisbären Bremerhaven
- 2016: Hapoel Holon
- 2016–2018: Maccabi Ashdod
- 2018–2020: Maccabi Rishon LeZion
- 2020–2022: Hapoel Jerusalem
- 2022–2023: Hapoel Tel Aviv
- 2023–2026: Maccabi Ramat Gan
- 2026–present: Ironi Ness Ziona

Career highlights
- Israeli League All-Star (2022); Israeli League Cup winner (2018); Israeli League champion (2015)

Adam Ariel (Hebrew: אדם אריאל; born December 10, 1994) is an Israeli-German professional basketball player for Ironi Ness Ziona of the Israeli Basketball Premier League.

Playing at the shooting guard and small forward positions, he has spent the majority of his professional career in Israel, winning an Israeli Basketball Premier League championship with Hapoel Jerusalem in 2015 and an Israeli League Cup with Maccabi Rishon LeZion in 2018, while also earning an Israeli Basketball All-Star selection in 2022.

Internationally, Ariel represents the Israel senior national basketball team, having competed in FIBA Basketball World Cup and FIBA EuroBasket qualification campaigns since making his senior debut in 2018. He also represented Israel at the youth level in the FIBA Europe Under-18 and Under-20 Championships.

== Early life ==
Ariel was born in Jerusalem and played for the Hapoel Jerusalem youth team.

== Professional career ==
=== Hapoel Jerusalem ===
In 2012, Ariel joined the Hapoel Jerusalem senior team , with which he played three seasons. In 2012-13, at the age of 17, he played in 10 games and averaged 3.0 minutes a game. In 2013-14, he played in 44 games and averaged 8.8 minutes and 2.6 points per game, while shooting 48.2% from the floor and 81.5% from the free throw line.

In his third year, in 2014-15, he played in 41 games and averaged 9.3 minutes, 2.4 points, and 1.2 rebounds per game, and with the team won the 2015 Israeli League Championship.

=== Eisbären Bremerhaven ===
On July 7, 2015, Ariel signed with German club Eisbären Bremerhaven for the 2015–16 season under head coach Muli Katzurin. In 8 games he averaged 7.1 minutes and 2.0 points per game. On January 6, 2016, Ariel parted ways with Bremerhaven to join Hapoel Holon for the remainder of the season.

=== Hapoel Holon ===
On January 6, 2016, Ariel signed with Hapoel Holon. In 2016 with the team, in 19 games he averaged 14.8 minutes, 2.8 points, and 1.7 rebounds per game,

=== Maccabi Ashdod ===
On July 12, 2016, Ariel signed with Maccabi Ashdod for the 2016–17 season. In 2016-17 with the team, he played 23 games and averaged 22.1 minutes, 6.4 points, 2.4 rebounds, and 1.3 assists, while shooting 86.4% from the free throw line.

On July 24, 2017, Ariel signed a one-year contract extension with Ashdod, and became the team's captain. In 31 games played during the 2017–18 season, he averaged 20.0 minutes, 6.8 points, 2.9 rebounds, and 1.0 assists per game, while shooting 41.6 percent from three-point range. Ariel helped Ashdod reach the 2018 Israeli League Playoffs, where they were eliminated by Hapoel Tel Aviv in the Quarterfinals.

=== Maccabi Rishon LeZion ===
On July 3, 2018, Ariel signed a two-year deal with Maccabi Rishon LeZion. On May 13, 2019, Ariel recorded a season-high 19 points, shooting 5-of-6 from three-point range, in a 102–105 loss to Hapoel Holon. Ariel won the 2018 Israeli League Cup title with Rishon LeZion, as well as reaching the 2019 Israeli League Finals, where they eventually fell short to Maccabi Tel Aviv. In 38 games played during the 2018–19 season, he averaged 22.2 minutes, 7.4 points, 2.4 rebounds, and 0.9 assists per game, while shooting 85.0% from the free throw line.

On November 29, 2019, Ariel recorded 15 points, including a game-winner three-pointer with 0.6 seconds left to give Rishon LeZion a 77–74 win over Hapoel Tel Aviv. On February 3, 2020, Ariel recorded a career-high 21 points in an 80–72 win over Hapoel Be'er Sheva. In 42 games played during the 2019–20 season, he averaged 20.9 minutes, 8.4 points, 2.3 rebounds, and 0.9 assists per game.

=== Return to Hapoel Jerusalem ===
In August 2020, Ariel signed a one-year contract to return to Jerusalem. In July 2021, Ariel signed a two-year extension with the club, and two months later was named the team's captain. In 2020-21 he was second in the Israel Basketball Premier League in three-point field goal percentage (46.2 per cent). In 38 games played during the season, he also averaged 21.5 minutes, 8.4 points, and 2.3 rebounds per game.

In 2021-22 with the team he played 43 games and averaged 19.3 minutes, 6.7 points, and 2.0 rebounds per game. He was voted to the Israeli League All-Star Game.

=== Hapoel Tel Aviv ===
In August 2022, Ariel signed with Hapoel Tel Aviv. In 2022-23 with the team he played 36 games and averaged 11.2 minutes, 3.9 points, and 1.0 rebounds per game.

=== Ironi Ramat Gan ===
In 2023-24 with Ironi Ramat Gan he played 34 games and averaged 27.8 minutes, 10.8 points, 3.8 rebounds , and 1.5 assists per game.

In 2024-25 with the team he played 42 games and averaged 27.8 minutes, 12.0 points, 3.5 rebounds, and 1.7 assists per game, while shooting 48.4% from the floor.

In 2025-26 with the team he played 30 games and averaged 32.6 minutes, 14.2 points, 4.8 rebounds, 2.2 assists, and 1.0 steals per game, all career season highs.

=== Ironi Ness Ziona ===
In the summer of 2026, he signed with Ironi Ness Ziona of the Israeli Basketball Premier League. He was sidelined with a fracture of the acetabular rim in his hip joint, suffered in September 2026, which forced him to miss the start of the 2026–27 Israeli Basketball Premier League season.

== National team career ==
Ariel is a member of the Israel national basketball team. On September 13, 2018, he made his first appearance for the Israeli team in an 80–85 loss against Georgia, recording nine points and five rebounds off the bench.

Ariel was also a member of the Israeli Under-18 and Under-20 national teams.

== See also ==
- Sports in Israel
