= Erez Markovich =

Israeli basketball player

Erez Markovich ארז מרקוביץ
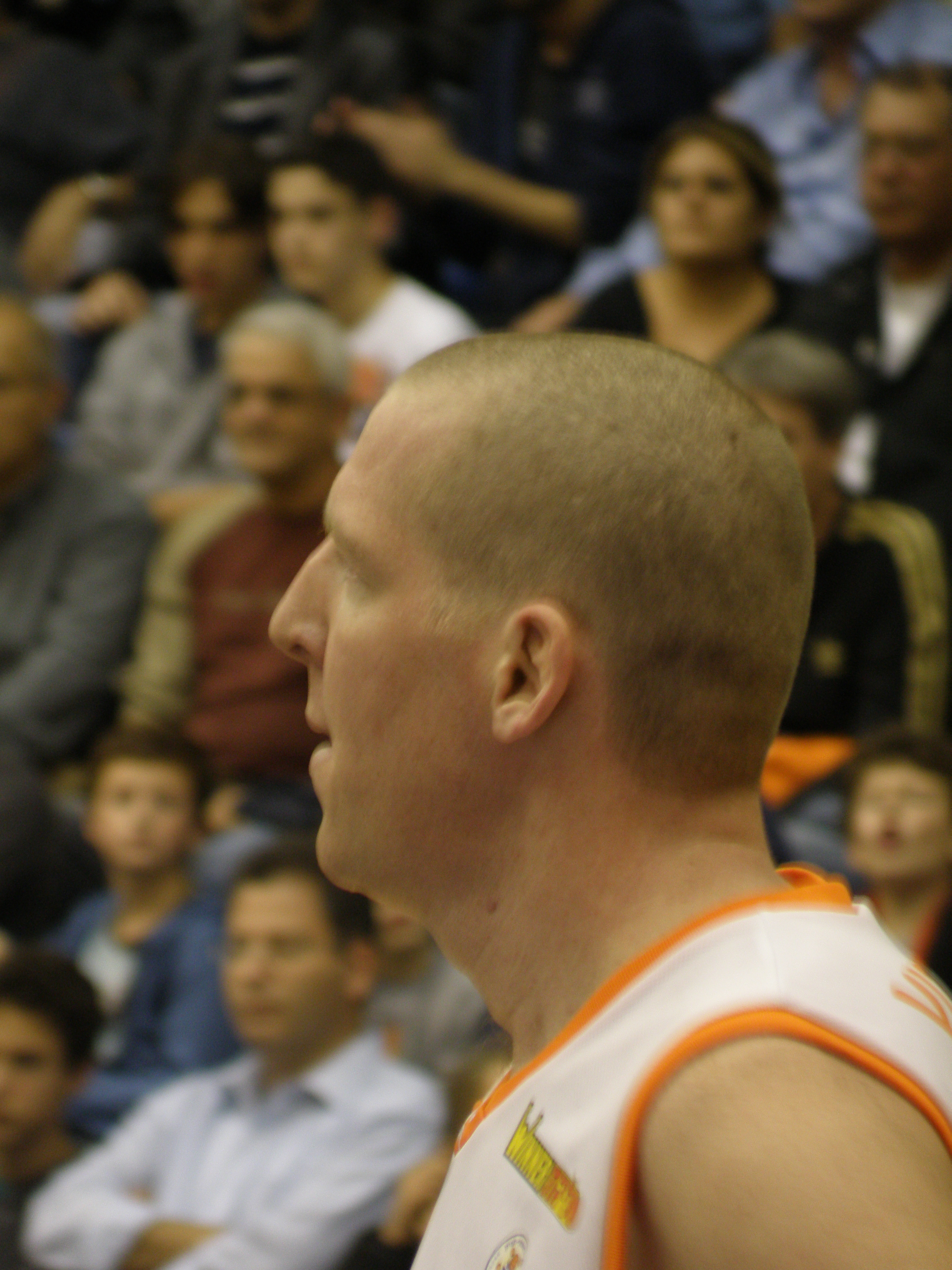

Personal information
- Born: July 10, 1978 (age 48) Eilat, Israel
- Listed height: 2.03 m (6 ft 8 in)

Erez Markovich (Hebrew: ארז מרקוביץ; born July 10, 1978) is an Israeli former basketball player who played the center position. He played in the Jeep Élite league, in the Israeli Basketball Premier League, and for the Israeli national basketball team.

== Biography ==
Markovich was born in Eilat, Israel. He is 6 feet 8 inches (203 cm) tall.

He played basketball for Paris Racing Basket of the Pro A league, and in the Israeli Basketball Premier League for Maccabi Rishon LeZion, Maccabi Ramat Gan, Elitzur Ashkelon, Maccabi Ironi Nahariya, and Hapoel Jerusalem. Markovich played in the 2003 Israeli Basketball All-Star Game, and on the 2005 FIBA EuroCup All-Star Day.

Markovich also played for the Israeli national basketball team as a junior in the 1996 European Championship for Men 22 and Under, and as a senior in the 2003 European Championship for Men, 2005 EuroBasket, 2007 EuroBasket, and 2009 EuroChallenge.
