= Elishay Kadir =

Israeli basketball player

Elishay Kadir אלישי כדיר
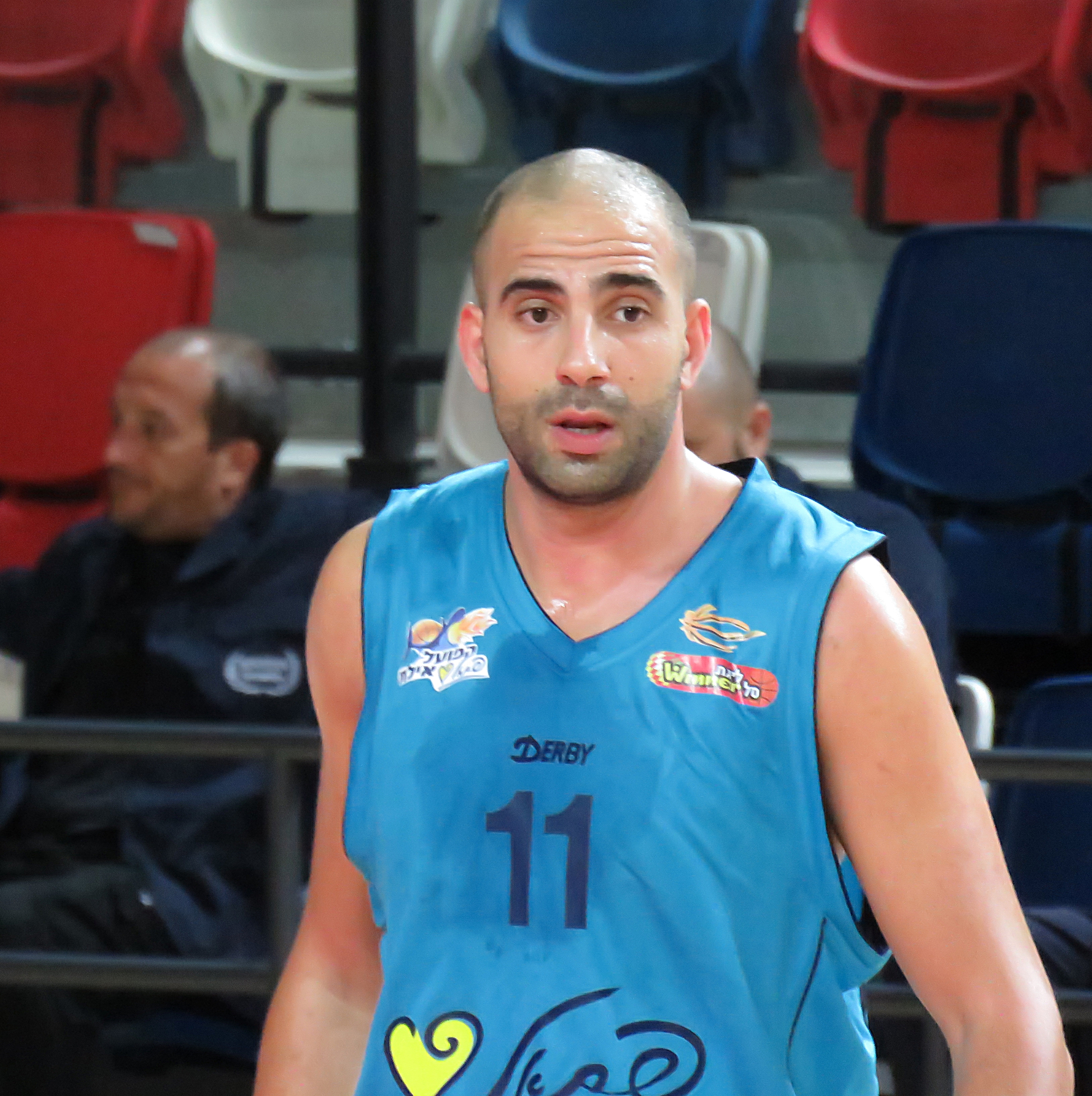
- Kadir with Hapoel Eilat in 2015

Bnei Herzliya
- Title: Assistant coach
- League: Israeli Basketball Premier League

Personal information
- Born: November 4, 1987 (age 39) Yavne, Israel
- Listed height: 6 ft 8 in (2.03 m)
- Listed weight: 245 lb (111 kg)

Career information
- Playing career: 2005–2022
- Position: Power forward / center

Career history

Playing
- 2005–2008: Ironi Ramat Gan
- 2008–2010: Hapoel Gilboa Galil
- 2010: Maccabi Tel Aviv
- 2010–2011: Maccabi Haifa
- 2011–2013: Hapoel Jerusalem
- 2013–2016: Hapoel Eilat
- 2016–2017: Maccabi Rishon LeZion
- 2017–2019: Ironi Nes Ziona
- 2019–2020: Hapoel Tel Aviv
- 2020–2021: Bnei Herzliya

Coaching
- 2024–present: Bnei Herzliya

Career highlights
- Israeli League Champion (2010); Israeli League MVP (2010); All-Israeli League First Team (2010); 5× Israeli League All-Star (2011–2012, 2015–2016, 2018)

Elishay Kadir (Hebrew: אלישי כדיר; born November 4, 1987) is an Israeli coach, and former professional basketball player. He played the power forward position, and was named the Israeli League MVP in 2010. Kadir currently serves as an assistant coach for Bnei Herzliya of the Israeli Basketball Premier League.

== Professional career ==
Elishay born and raised in Yavne. He started playing in the youth team of Ironi Ramat Gan simultaneously with his high school team. He has been promoted to the pro team during 2004–05 season, playing four games for the team, who played in the Second League. In the same year, Kadir led his high school team to the national final averaging 30 points and 5 rebounds per game.

In the summer he participated in the FIBA Europe Under-18 Championship and led the Israeli team to 7th place, averaging 15.9 points and 7.1 rebounds per game.

Before 2005–06 season, Kadir signed a three-year contract with his childhood club Ironi Ramat Gan. Kadir gained some playing minutes, but didn't help the team to avoid relegation from the 2005–06 Israeli Basketball Super League.

During 2006–07 season, Elishay became a starting five player promoting with his team back to Ligat HaAl and qualifying to the State Cup semifinals.

Kadir finished his second year in the first league with averages of 7.5 points and 3.1 rebounds in 17 minutes per game. In the end of that year Kadir decided to leave Ramat Gan and signed for two years with Hapoel Gilboa Galil.

In his first year with the team they qualified to the 2008–09 Israeli Final Four.

In his second year with Galil Gilboa, Kadir led the team to winning the championship with averages of 14.2 points and 5.9 rebounds. In the end of that year he was named League's MVP.

In June 2010 Kadir signed for three years with Maccabi Tel Aviv. Five months later he was loaned to Maccabi Haifa for the remainder of the season due to lack of playing minutes.

In the end of the season Kadir was officially released from Maccabi Tel Aviv and signed a two years contract with Hapoel Jerusalem.

In the middle of 2013–14 season Kadir left Jerusalem after the team signed Lior Eliyahu in his position. He has signed with Hapoel Eilat.

On July 17, 2017, Kadir signed a two-year deal with Ironi Nes Ziona. In his second season with Nes Ziona, he helped the team reach the 2019 Israeli League Playoffs, where they eventually were eliminated by his former team Hapoel Eilat.

On August 11, 2019, Kadir joined Hapoel Tel Aviv, signing a one-year deal with an option for another one.

== Israeli national team ==
Kadir has represented Israel in Eurobasket 2011, Eurobasket 2013 and Eurobasket 2015.
