= 2010–11 Israeli Basketball Super League =

2010–2011 Israeli Basketball Premier League season
- League: Israeli Basketball Premier League
- Sport: Basketball
- Duration: 17 October 2010 - 26 May 2011
- Games: 135 (regular season)
- Teams: 10
- TV partner(s): Sport 5, Channel 1

Regular Season
- Season champions: Maccabi Tel Aviv
- Runners-up: Hapoel Gilboa Galil
- Season MVP: Gal Mekel
- Top scorer: Lee Nailon
- Relegated to Ligat Leumit: Ironi Ashkelon

Final Four
- Champions: Maccabi Tel Aviv
- Runners-up: Hapoel Gilboa Galil
- Finals MVP: David Blu

Israeli Basketball Super League seasons
- ← 2009–2010 2011–2012 →

The 2010–2011 Israeli Basketball Premier League (Officially known as the Ligat Loto for sponsorship reasons) was the 57th season of the Israel Basketball Premier League, the highest level of basketball in Israel. The season began on 17 October 2010 and ended on 26 May 2011.

== Format ==
Each of the 10 participating clubs played 18 regular league games, one home game and one away game against the other teams. After that, there is third round in which every team play against each other team once. The top eight teams advance to the playoffs, where they play a best-of-5 series decided by the rankings at the end of the regular season (first against eighth, second against seventh and so on). The series winners play in the Final Four to determine the championship. The two 9th and 10th ranked teams compete in a best-of-5 series relegation playoff, with the loser being relegated to the Liga Leumit for the 2011-12 season.

== Team information ==
Teams 2010-11

=== Teams and locations ===
| Team | Home city | Stadium | Capacity |
|---|---|---|---|
| Barak Netanya | Netanya | Yeshurun Hall | 1,000 |
| Bnei HaSharon | Ra'anana, Herzliya | HaYovel Herzliya | 1,750 |
| Hapoel Gilboa Galil Elyon | Gilboa Regional Council | Gan Ner Sports Hall | 2,400 |
| Hapoel Holon | Holon | Holon City Arena | 2,850 |
| Hapoel Jerusalem | Jerusalem | Malha Arena | 3,000 |
| Ironi Ashkelon | Ashkelon | Ashkelon Sport Arena | 3,000 |
| Maccabi Ashdod | Ashdod | HaKiriya Arena | 1,260 |
| Maccabi Haifa | Haifa | Romema Arena | 3,000 |
| Maccabi Rishon LeZion | Rishon LeZion | Beit Maccabi | 2,500 |
| Maccabi Tel Aviv | Tel Aviv | Menora Mivtachim Arena | 10,383 |

=== Head coaches ===
| Team | Head coach | Seasons as head coach |
|---|---|---|
| Barak Netanya | Eric Alfasi | 2 |
| Bnei HaSharon | Dan Shamir | 2 |
| Hapoel Gilboa Galil Elyon | Lior Lubin | 1 |
| Hapoel Holon | Danny Franco | 2 |
| Hapoel Jerusalem | Oded Kattash | 1 |
| Ironi Ashkelon | Eli Rabbi | 1 |
| Maccabi Ashdod | Ofer Berkovich | 1 |
| Maccabi Haifa | Mickey Gorka | 1 |
| Maccabi Rishon LeZion | Effi Birnbaum | 2 |
| Maccabi Tel Aviv | David Blatt | 3 |

== Regular season ==
| | Team | Pld | W | L | PF | PA | Diff | Pts | Qualification or relegation |
|---|---|---|---|---|---|---|---|---|---|
| 1. | Maccabi Tel Aviv | 27 | 26 | 1 | 2523 | 2014 | 509 | 53 | 2011–12 Euroleague Group stage |
| 2. | Hapoel Gilboa Galil Elyon | 27 | 17 | 10 | 2177 | 2126 | 51 | 44 | |
| 3. | Hapoel Jerusalem | 27 | 16 | 11 | 2272 | 2220 | 52 | 43 | 2011–12 Eurocup Group stage |
| 4. | Bnei HaSharon | 27 | 16 | 11 | 2275 | 2229 | 46 | 43 | |
| 5. | Maccabi Rishon LeZion | 27 | 13 | 14 | 2131 | 2215 | –84 | 40 | |
| 6. | Maccabi Ashdod | 27 | 13 | 14 | 2216 | 2243 | –27 | 40 | |
| 7. | Hapoel Holon | 27 | 11 | 16 | 2056 | 2198 | –142 | 38 | |
| 8. | Barak Netanya | 27 | 9 | 18 | 2087 | 2206 | –119 | 36 | |
| 9. | Maccabi Haifa | 27 | 8 | 19 | 2212 | 2303 | –91 | 35 | |
| 10. | Ironi Ashkelon | 27 | 6 | 21 | 2106 | 2301 | –195 | 33 | |

| Qualification to Playoffs |
| Qualification to Relegation Playoffs |

Pld – Played; W – Won; L – Lost; PF – Points for; PA – Points against; Diff – Difference; Pts – Points.

=== Rounds 1-2 ===
| | BNT | BNS | HPG | HPH | HPJ | IAS | MAS | MHA | MRL | MTA | Rec. |
| Barak Netanya | | 77–66 | 66-72 | 80–65 | 93-103 | 60–58 | 85-59 | 72–77 | 96–99 | 71-85 | 4–5 |
| Bnei HaSharon | 89–68 | | 80–95 | 80–79 | 81–76 | 96-75 | 85–90 | 93–89 | 89–75 | 67-113 | 6–3 |
| Hapoel Gilboa Galil Elyon | 83–66 | 69–48 | | 74-69 | 73-74 | 83–73 | 83–89 | 85–65 | 74–76 | 61–82 | 4–5 |
| Hapoel Holon | 63–79 | 86-69 | 91–93 | | 76–65 | 84–80 | 70-86 | 81–84 | 88-81 | 74-88 | 4–5 |
| Hapoel Jerusalem | 91–75 | 102–93 | 94–86 | 80-86 | | 105-75 | 98–83 | 95-90 | 75–66 | 73-84 | 7–2 |
| Ironi Ashkelon | 74-76 | 91–80 | 76-80 | 78-89 | 68–75 | | 83–86 | 99-91 | 88-89 | 87–104 | 2–7 |
| Maccabi Ashdod | 87–84 | 78-81 | 90-93 | 69–77 | 98–75 | 79–69 | | 75–72 | 76–79 | 62–84 | 4–5 |
| Maccabi Haifa | 91-83 | 97-100 | 77–83 | 73-77 | 76–93 | 86–88 | 95-81 | | 82-91 | 86-100 | 2–7 |
| Maccabi Rishon LeZion | 75–67 | 60–86 | 78-68 | 85–87 | 83-80 | 73–83 | 78-77 | 96-85 | | 68–89 | 5–4 |
| Maccabi Tel Aviv | 117–69 | 88–91 | 102–75 | 102–63 | 75–55 | 88–66 | 99-82 | 101–92 | 88-74 | | 8–1 |
| Record | 2–7 | 5–4 | 6–3 | 5–4 | 4–5 | 2–7 | 4–5 | 2–7 | 5–4 | 9–0 | |

The home team is listed on the left-hand column.
The rightmost column and the bottom row list the teams' home and away records respectively.
^{1}The match between Maccabi Haifa and Maccabi Rishon LeZion was postponed because of the 2010 Mount Carmel forest fire. It was played on January 13.
^{2}The match between Maccabi Haifa and Hapoel Holon was postponed at Maccabi Haifa's request. It was played on January 27.

=== Round 3 ===
==== 1st Week ====
| Home | | Away | |
| Team | Pts. | Pts. | Team |
|---|---|---|---|
| Hapoel Gilboa Galil | 82 | 70 | Maccabi Haifa |
| Maccabi Rishon LeZion | 80 | 76 | Maccabi Ashdod |
| Bnei HaSharon | 88 | 66 | Barak Netanya |
| Maccabi Tel Aviv | 85 | 79 | Hapoel Holon |
| Hapoel jerusalem | 107 | 89 | Ironi Ashkelon |

==== 2nd Week ====
| Home | | Away | |
| Team | Pts. | Pts. | Team |
|---|---|---|---|
| Maccabi Ashdod | 100 | 99 | Hapoel Gilboa Galil |
| Ironi Ashkelon | 79 | 89 | Bnei HaSharon |
| Barak Netanya | 102 | 88 | Maccabi Rishon LeZion |
| Maccabi Tel Aviv | 107 | 66 | Hapoel Jerusalem |
| Hapoel Holon | 88 | 67 | Maccabi Haifa |

==== 3rd Week ====
| Home | | Away | |
| Team | Pts. | Pts. | Team |
|---|---|---|---|
| Hapoel Jerusalem | 102 | 68 | Hapoel Holon |
| Hapoel Gilboa Galil | 85 | 76 | Barak Netanya |
| Maccabi Haifa | 73 | 66 | Maccabi Ashdod |
| Bnei HaSharon | 88 | 90 | Maccabi Tel Aviv |
| Maccabi Rishon LeZion | 67 | 76 | Ironi Ashkelon |

==== 4th Week ====
| Home | | Away | |
| Team | Pts. | Pts. | Team |
|---|---|---|---|
| Maccabi Tel Aviv | 80 | 72 | Maccabi Rishon LeZion |
| Hapoel Holon | 51 | 91 | Maccabi Ashdod |
| Ironi Ashkelon | 65 | 89 | Hapoel Gilboa Galil |
| Barak Netanya | 84 | 80 | Maccabi Haifa |
| Hapoel Jerusalem | 99 | 90 | Bnei HaSharon |

==== 5th Week ====
| Home | | Away | |
| Team | Pts. | Pts. | Team |
|---|---|---|---|
| Maccabi Ashdod | 97 | 89 | Barak Netanya |
| Maccabi Rishon LeZion | 75 | 87 | Hapoel Jerusalem |
| Bnei HaSharon | 82 | 73 | Hapoel Holon |
| Hapoel Gilboa Galil | 68 | 79 | Maccabi Tel Aviv |
| Maccabi Haifa | 74 | 72 | Ironi Ashkelon |

==== 6th Week ====
| Home | | Away | |
| Team | Pts. | Pts. | Team |
|---|---|---|---|
| Hapoel Holon | 82 | 75 | Barak Netanya |
| Maccabi Tel Aviv | 98 | 95 | Maccabi Haifa |
| Hapoel Jerusalem | 82 | 84 | Hapoel Gilboa Galil |
| Bnei HaSharon | 81 | 88 | Maccabi Rishon LeZion |
| Ironi Ashkelon | 84 | 104 | Maccabi Ashdod |

==== 7th Week ====
| Home | | Away | |
| Team | Pts. | Pts. | Team |
|---|---|---|---|
| Maccabi Ashdod | 78 | 107 | Maccabi Tel Aviv |
| Maccabi Haifa | 79 | 58 | Hapoel Jerusalem |
| Maccabi Rishon LeZion | 81 | 71 | Hapoel Holon |
| Hapoel Gilboa Galil | 86 | 78 | Bnei HaSharon |
| Barak Netanya | 87 | 56 | Ironi Ashkelon |

==== 8th Week ====
| Home | | Away | |
| Team | Pts. | Pts. | Team |
|---|---|---|---|
| Maccabi Tel Aviv | 92 | 60 | Barak Netanya |
| Bnei HaSharon | 92 | 90 | Maccabi Haifa |
| Maccabi Rishon LeZion | 84 | 88 | Hapoel Gilboa Galil |
| Hapoel Jerusalem | 78 | 86 | Maccabi Ashdod |
| Hapoel Holon | 64 | 82 | Ironi Ashkelon |

==== 9th Week ====
| Home | | Away | |
| Team | Pts. | Pts. | Team |
|---|---|---|---|
| Hapoel Gilboa Galil | 87 | 75 | Hapoel Holon |
| Maccabi Haifa | 76 | 70 | Maccabi Rishon LeZion |
| Ironi Ashkelon | 92 | 96 | Maccabi Tel Aviv |
| Maccabi Ashdod | 71 | 92 | Bnei HaSharon |
| Barak Netanya | 81 | 84 | Hapoel Jerusalem |

== Playoff ==
The higher ranked team hosts games 1, 3 and 5 (if necessary). The lower ranked team hosts games 2 and 4 (if necessary).

| Team #1 | Agg. | Team #2 | Game 1 April 26–28 | Game 2 April 30 May 4–5 | Game 3 May 11–12 | Game 4 May 15 |
|---|---|---|---|---|---|---|
| Maccabi Tel Aviv (1) | 3–0 | (8) Barak Netanya | 94-72 | 92-78 | 92-78 | |
| Hapoel Gilboa Galil (2) | 3–1 | (7) Hapoel Holon | 77-59 | 67-68 | 89-73 | 82-75 |
| Hapoel Jerusalem (3) | 3–0 | (6) Maccabi Ashdod | 90-66 | 69-68 | 86-76 | |
| Bnei HaSharon (4) | 1–3 | (5) Maccabi Rishon LeZion | 91-82 | 79-81 | 75-82 | 95-105 |

== Final four ==
Semifinals; 24 May
Maccabi Tel Aviv | 100
Maccabi Rishon LeZion | 77
Hapoel Gilboa Galil | 98
Hapoel Jerusalem | 80

Final; 26 May
Maccabi Tel Aviv | 91
Hapoel Gilboa Galil | 64
Third place
Hapoel Jerusalem | 94
Maccabi Rishon LeZion | 74

== Relegation Playoff ==
The higher ranked team hosts games 1, 3 and 5 (if necessary). The lower ranked team hosts games 2 and 4 (if necessary).

| Team #1 | Agg. | Team #2 | Game 1 April 28 | Game 2 May 5 | Game 3 May 12 | Game 4 May 15 |
|---|---|---|---|---|---|---|
| Maccabi Haifa (9) | 3–1 | Ironi Ashkelon (10) | 74-67 | 57-62 | 91-72 | 96-89 |

Ironi Ashkelon was relegated to the Liga Leumit.

== 2011 BSL All-Star Game ==
On December 8, the BSL League Administration announced the re-establishment of the BSL All-Star Game, which played on January 12, 2011. The main event was the game between the Israeli All-Stars (coached by Effi Birnbaum and Oded Kattash) and the International All-Stars (coached by David Blatt and Dan Shamir). The players were chosen by online voting.

== Stats Leaders ==
As of March 21

=== Efficiency ===
| Rank | Name | Team | Efficiency | Games | EPG |
|---|---|---|---|---|---|
| 1. | (United States) Shawn James | Bnei HaSharon | 567 | 21 | 27 |
| 2. | (United States) Rahshon Turner | Ironi Ashkelon | 490 | 21 | 23.33 |
| 3. | (United States) Doron Perkins | Maccabi Tel Aviv | 478 | 22 | 21.73 |
| 4. | (United States) Marco Killingsworth | Hapoel Gilboa Galil | 443 | 22 | 20.14 |
| 5. | (United States) Dwayne Mitchell | Maccabi Rishon LeZion | 440 | 22 | 20 |

=== Points ===
| Rank | Name | Team | Points | Games | PPG |
|---|---|---|---|---|---|
| 1. | (United States) Lee Nailon | Bnei HaSharon | 384 | 21 | 18.29 |
| 2. | (United States) Ramel Bradley | Maccabi Ashdod | 318 | 18 | 17.67 |
| 3. | (United States) Marco Killingsworth | Hapoel Gilboa Galil | 369 | 22 | 16.77 |
| 4. | (United States) Josh Carter | Maccabi Ashdod | 366 | 22 | 16.64 |
| 5. | (United States) Rahshon Turner | Ironi Ashkelon | 349 | 21 | 16.62 |

=== Rebounds ===
| Rank | Name | Team | Rebounds | Games | RPG |
|---|---|---|---|---|---|
| 1. | (United States) Shawn James | Bnei HaSharon | 234 | 21 | 11.14 |
| 2. | (United States) Elton Brown | Barak Netanya | 197 | 22 | 8.95 |
| 3. | (United States) Rahshon Turner | Ironi Ashkelon | 173 | 21 | 8.24 |
| 4. | (United States) Josh Duncan | Maccabi Ashdod | 139 | 19 | 7.32 |
| 5. | (United States) Marco Killingsworth | Hapoel Gilboa Galil | 158 | 22 | 7.18 |

=== Assists ===
| Rank | Name | Team | Assists | Games | APG |
|---|---|---|---|---|---|
| 1. | (Israel) Shmulik Brener | Barak Netanya | 130 | 21 | 6.19 |
| 2. | (Israel) Gal Mekel | Hapoel Gilboa Galil | 136 | 22 | 6.18 |
| 3. | (Israel) Moran Roth | Hapoel Holon | 109 | 18 | 6.06 |
| 4. | (Israel) Meir Tapiro | Maccabi Ashdod | 131 | 22 | 5.95 |
| 5. | (United States) Jeremy Pargo | Maccabi Tel Aviv | 126 | 22 | 5.73 |

== Game records ==
| Stat | Player | | Team | | Game | |
|---|---|---|---|---|---|---|
| Points | 34 | Rahshon Turner (Ironi Ashkelon) | 117 | Maccabi Tel Aviv | 199 | Hapoel Gilboa Galil 99–100 Maccabi Ashdod |
| Rebounds | 21 | Elton Brown (Barak Netanya) | 57 | Barak Netanya | 97 | Maccabi Ashdod vs. Barak Netanya |
| Defensive Rebounds | 15 | Shawn James (Bnei HaSharon) | 37 | Hapoel Holon | 66 | Hapoel Holon vs. Maccabi Rishon LeZion |
| Offensive Rebounds | 10 | Elton Brown (Barak Netanya) | 27 | Barak Netanya | 39 | Maccabi Ashdod vs. Barak Netanya |
| Assists | 14 | Will Solomon (Hapoel Jerusalem) | 32 | Maccabi Tel Aviv | 54 | Maccabi Tel Aviv vs. Maccabi Haifa |
| Steals | 8 | Ramel Bradley (Maccabi Ashdod) | 17 | Maccabi Ashdod | 27 | Barak Netanya vs. Maccabi Rishon LeZion |
| Steals | 8 | Ramel Bradley (Maccabi Ashdod) | 17 | Maccabi Ashdod | 27 | Maccabi Tel Aviv vs. Maccabi Rishon LeZion |
| Blocks | 7 | Richard Hendrix (Maccabi Tel Aviv) | 9 | Hapoel Jerusalem | 12 | Maccabi Ashdod vs. Ironi Ashkelon |
| Blocks | 7 | Richard Hendrix (Maccabi Tel Aviv) | 9 | Bnei HaSharon | 12 | Hapoel Jerusalem vs. Maccabi Rishon LeZion |
| Blocks | 7 | Richard Hendrix (Maccabi Tel Aviv) | 9 | Bnei HaSharon | 12 | Bnei HaSharon vs. Maccabi Tel Aviv |
| Efficiency | 47 | Rahshon Turner (Ironi Ashkelon) | 159 | Maccabi Tel Aviv | 253 | Hapoel Holon vs. Hapoel Gilboa Galil |
| Turnovers | 9 | Frank Robinson (Maccabi Haifa) | 24 | Hapoel Gilboa Galil | 43 | Bnei HaSharon vs. Maccabi Ashdod |
| Turnovers | 9 | Dwayne Mitchell (Maccabi Rishon LeZion) | 24 | Hapoel Gilboa Galil | 43 | Bnei HaSharon vs. Maccabi Ashdod |
| Free throws | 12/12 | Doron Perkins (Maccabi Tel Aviv) | 14/15 | Bnei HaSharon | 42/47 | Maccabi Ashdod vs. Maccabi Tel Aviv |
| Free throws | 12/12 | Richard Melzer (Hapoel Holon) | 14/15 | Bnei HaSharon | 42/47 | Maccabi Ashdod vs. Maccabi Tel Aviv |
| Field goals | 9/9 | Elton Brown (Barak Netanya) | 46/69 | Maccabi Tel Aviv | 73/130 | Maccabi Tel Aviv vs. Maccabi Haifa |
| Field goals | 9/9 | Rahshon Turner (Ironi Ashkelon) | 46/69 | Maccabi Tel Aviv | 73/130 | Maccabi Tel Aviv vs. Maccabi Haifa |
| Field goals | 9/9 | Nitzan Hanochi (Maccabi Rishon LeZion) | 46/69 | Maccabi Tel Aviv | 73/130 | Maccabi Tel Aviv vs. Maccabi Haifa |
| 2-point field goals | 10/10 | Milan Mačvan (Maccabi Tel Aviv) | 30/38 | Maccabi Tel Aviv | 44/66 | Ironi Ashkelon vs. Maccabi Rishon LeZion |
| 3-point field goals | 4/4 | Nitzan Hanochi (Maccabi Rishon LeZion) | 18/27 | Hapoel Jerusalem | 23/43 | Hapoel Jerusalem vs. Maccabi Haifa |

== Awards ==
| Month | Weeks | Best player Best coach | Team | Efficiency W-L |
|---|---|---|---|---|
| October | 1–3 | (United States) Shawn James | Bnei HaSharon | 28 |
| October | 1–3 | (Israel) Dan Shamir | Bnei HaSharon | 3-0 |
| November | 4-7 | (Israel) Yogev Ohayon | Hapoel Jerusalem | 15 |
| November | 4-7 | (Israel) Oded Kattash | Hapoel Jerusalem | 4-0 |
| December | 8-11 | (Israel) Meir Tapiro | Maccabi Ashdod | 12.5 |
| December | 8-11 | (Israel) Ofer Berkovich | Maccabi Ashdod | 3-1 |
| January | 12-16 | (Israel) Nitzan Hanochi | Maccabi Rishon LeZion | 13.4 |
| January | 12-16 | (Israel) Effi Birnbaum | Maccabi Rishon LeZion | 4-1 |
| February | 17-19 | (Israel) Moran Roth | Hapoel Holon | 15.7 |
| February | 17-19 | (Israel) Danny Franco | Hapoel Holon | 2-1 |
| March | 20-23 | (Israel) Shay Doron | Elitzur Ramla | - |
| March | 20-23 | (Israel) Adan Inbar | Elitzur Ramla | - |

== See also ==
- Israeli Basketball State Cup 2010-11
- Israeli Basketball League Cup 2010
