= Justin Lewis (basketball) =

American basketball player (born 2002)

No. 11 – Maccabi Ramat Gan
- Position: Power forward / small forward
- League: Israeli Basketball Premier League

Personal information
- Born: April 12, 2002 (age 24) Baltimore, Maryland, U.S.
- Listed height: 6 ft 7 in (2.01 m)
- Listed weight: 240 lb (109 kg)

Career information
- High school: Baltimore Poly (Baltimore, Maryland)
- College: Marquette (2020–2022)
- NBA draft: 2022: undrafted
- Playing career: 2023–present

Career history
- 2023: Windy City Bulls
- 2023–2024: Salt Lake City Stars
- 2024: Calgary Surge
- 2024: Salt Lake City Stars
- 2025: Delaware Blue Coats
- 2025–2026: Limoges CSP
- 2026–present: Maccabi Ramat Gan

Career highlights
- First-team All-Big East (2022); Big East Most Improved Player (2022)
- Stats at NBA.com
- Stats at Basketball Reference

Justin Keith Lewis (born April 12, 2002) is an American professional basketball player for Maccabi Ramat Gan of the Israeli Basketball Premier League. He played college basketball for the Marquette Golden Eagles.

== Early life ==
Lewis was born and grew up in Baltimore, Maryland and initially attended Calvert Hall College High School. He transferred to the Baltimore Polytechnic Institute after his freshman year. As a junior, Lewis averaged 17.3 points and 9.2 rebounds per game with 16 double doubles and was named first team All-Metro and second team All-Maryland by USA Today as Baltimore Polytechnic won the state championship. As a senior, he averaged 19.3 points, 13.4 rebounds and 4.4 blocks per game and was named the Metro Co-player of the Year and first-team All-Maryland while leading the team to a second straight state championship. A four-star recruit, Lewis committed to playing college basketball for Marquette over offers from UConn and Virginia Tech, among others.

== College career ==
Lewis came off (and on) the bench for Marquette as a freshman. He averaged 7.8 points and 5.4 rebounds per game. On January 26, 2022, Lewis scored a career-high 33 points as well as nine rebounds and six assists in a 73–63 win against Seton Hall. He was named to the First Team All-Big East, as well as Big East Most Improved Player.

== Professional career ==
=== Windy City Bulls (2023) ===
After becoming undrafted in the 2022 NBA draft, Lewis signed a two-way contract with the Chicago Bulls on July 7, 2022 and afterwards joined them in the 2022 NBA Summer League. In his Summer League debut, Lewis scored eight points and five rebounds in a 100–99 win against the Dallas Mavericks. Justin Lewis tore his ACL and was later waived on October 15 while he rehabbed the injury.

On March 7, 2023, Lewis signed another two-way contract with the Chicago Bulls, but was waived on December 16, after appearing in 12 games with the Windy City Bulls. Two days later, he returned to Windy City.

=== Salt Lake City Stars (2023–2024) ===
On December 27, 2023, Lewis was traded to the Salt Lake City Stars.

=== Calgary Surge (2024) ===
On May 1, 2024, Lewis signed with the Calgary Surge of the Canadian Elite Basketball League. However, he was waived on July 22.

=== Return to Salt Lake City (2024) ===
On October 13, 2024, Lewis signed with the Utah Jazz, but was waived three days later. On October 28, he rejoined the Salt Lake City Stars.

=== Delaware Blue Coats (2025) ===
On February 20, 2025, Lewis was acquired by the Delaware Blue Coats in exchange for player rights of Rob Edwards as well as a 2025 second-round pick in the NBA G League draft.

=== Limoges CSP (2025–present) ===
On August 7, 2025, he signed with Limoges CSP of the LNB Pro A.

== Career statistics ==
Legend
GP	Games played	GS	Games started	MPG	Minutes per game
FG%	Field goal percentage	3P%	3-point field goal percentage	FT%	Free throw percentage
RPG	Rebounds per game	APG	Assists per game	SPG	Steals per game
BPG	Blocks per game	PPG	Points per game	**Bold**	Career high

=== College ===
Year	Team	GP	GS	MPG	FG%	3P%	FT%	RPG	APG	SPG	BPG	PPG
2020–21	Marquette	21	1	21.0	.417	.219	.577	5.4	.8	.4	.7	7.8
2021–22	Marquette	32	32	32.2	.440	.345	.761	7.9	1.7	1.1	.6	16.8
