= Mor Metro-West High School =

Location
- Ra'anana; Israel

Information
- Established: 1991; 34 years ago

Metro-West High School was established in 1991, in the city of Ra'anana, Israel, and was the second high school to be opened in the city after 30 years in which the only high school in Ra'anana was Ostrovsky. The school is named after the Jewish Federation of Greater MetroWest community in New Jersey, which built strong connections with the city of Ra'anana. The school was the first step towards building "Kiryat Ha'hinuch" (suburb of education) that includes also the "Metro-West" sports hall, Amit "Renanim" school and the art center. The name MOR is the Hebrew name of the school, having a double meaning: Acronym of Metro-West-Ra'annana in Hebrew, and after ריח המור (smell of the "mor" in Hebrew).

The school's basketball team plays in "Orbit" League (the premiere high school national basketball league). The team has won the league three times in the past; 1999–00, 2003–04 and 2014–15. The team is well known for its group of fanatical supporters "U.M.W" (Ultra Metro West), who also refer to themselves as "The Alligators". "U.M.W" was founded in 2002 by Tal Geva, a student who attended Metro West High School. The team is widely supported by the school's long-serving principal Amnon Bar Natan. Many past individual players advanced to a professional career; among those most notable are Yotam Halperin, Nitzan Hanochi, Michael Brisker (son of American-Israeli basketball player Mark Brisker), and Mazor Mauda.
