= Marco Killingsworth =

American basketball player

Personal information
- Born: February 21, 1982 (age 44) Montgomery, Alabama, U.S.
- Listed height: 6 ft 8 in (2.03 m)
- Listed weight: 235 lb (107 kg)

Career information
- High school: Freedom Life Christian Academy (Montgomery, Alabama); Sidney Lanier (Montgomery, Alabama); Central Park Christian Academy (Birmingham, Alabama)
- College: Auburn (2001–2004); Indiana (2005–2006)
- NBA draft: 2006: undrafted
- Playing career: 2006–2017
- Position: Power forward / center

Career history
- 2006: Darüşşafaka
- 2006–2007: Jeonju KCC Egis
- 2007–2008: Scafati
- 2008–2009: Brindisi
- 2009–2010: Barak Netanya
- 2010–2011: Maccabi Haifa
- 2011: Hapoel Gilboa Galil
- 2011: Atléticos de San Germán
- 2011–2012: Ironi Ashkelon
- 2012–2013: Barak Netanya
- 2013–2014: Donetsk
- 2014: Academic Sofia
- 2014–2015: Ural Yekaterinburg
- 2015: Monaco
- 2015–2016: Maccabi Kiryat Gat
- 2016: BC Kalev
- 2016: Maccabi Kiryat Gat
- 2016–2017: Ironi Ramat Gan

Career highlights
- 3× Israeli league All-Star (2011–2012, 2016); AP Honorable mention All-American (2006); Second-team All-SEC – Coaches (2004); Third-team All-SEC – AP (2004)

Marco Bernard Killingsworth (born February 21, 1982) is an American former professional basketball player. He played in three different high schools in Alabama, spending his senior year at Central Park Christian Academy, where he was one of the top players in the nation in the class of 2001. He went on to play three years of college basketball at Auburn, and then transferred to Indiana where he played his senior year. He went undrafted in the 2006 NBA draft and started his professional career in Europe with Turkish team Darüşşafaka. He has played several years in Israel, where he earned three All-Star selections. Throughout his career he has played in Estonia, France, Israel, Italy, Puerto Rico, Russia, South Korea, Turkey and Ukraine.

== High school career ==
Killingsworth was born in Montgomery, Alabama to father John and mother Johnnie Mae (née Hooks). As a freshman he attended Freedom Life Christian Academy in Montgomery, a private school, and for his sophomore season he transferred to Sidney Lanier High School, where as a junior he averaged 18 points, 16 rebounds and 6 blocks per game. In July 2000, the summer before his senior year, he participated in the ABCD Camp, a camp for the best high school players in the United States. In the summer of 2000 Killingsworth enrolled at Emmanuel Christian Academy in Durham, North Carolina, where his father lived after he had divorced from Killingsworth's mother, planning to attend the prep school for his senior year; however, the school closed before the start of the basketball season, and Killingsworth moved back to Montgomery, where he enrolled at Central Park Christian Academy in Birmingham, Alabama.

In his senior season at Central Park, Killingsworth averaged 30 points, 13 rebounds and 7 blocks per game while shooting 67% from the field. Central Park reached the championship game of the National Christian School Championship, where they lost to Mount Zion Christian Academy despite Killingsworth's 37 points and 19 rebounds. He was named in the All-State First Team and he was ranked the second best player in the state of Alabama behind Ousmane Cisse of St. Jude Educational Institute. He was ranked as one of the best players in the nation by several recruiting services: he was the 12th best player overall by ESPN.com, which also ranked him the 3rd best power forward behind Kwame Brown and Ousmane Cisse. Hoop Scoop ranked him 40th overall, and he was the 53rd best player of his class according to the Recruiting Services Consensus Index (RSCI).

== College career ==
=== Auburn ===
Killingsworth was heavily recruited and earned interest by several major NCAA Division I programs. He received offers from Alabama, Auburn, Cincinnati, Florida, Georgia Tech, Indiana, LSU, Tennessee and UConn. He restricted his choice between Auburn, LSU and Florida, and then signed a National Letter of Intent to Auburn on November 11, 2000. In a 2019 interview, Killingsworth stated that he originally wanted to sign with Indiana, but changed his mind in 2000 after he learned of the 1997 incident when Indiana coach Bob Knight was accused of choking player Neil Reed.

Killingsworth chose to wear jersey number 4 at Auburn, and head coach Cliff Ellis gave him considerable playing time in his freshman year. He debuted on November 16, 2001, in the season opener against High Point, playing 23 minutes and recording 8 points, 5 rebounds and 4 assists. He had a season-high 9 rebounds against LSU, and he scored a season high 17 points on December 20, 2001, against UNC Asheville in 16 minutes of playing time. He started 14 of 28 games, averaging 7.8 points and 4.2 rebounds, and led the team in field goal percentage with 52.9%.

Killingsworth entered the starting lineup in his sophomore season. He made his season debut on November 22, 2002, against Wofford, and posted a double-double with 13 points and 10 rebounds. He posted a new career high during the season with 24 points against Georgia State (November 26), and scored more than 20 points in two more occasions: 21 against Western Kentucky (December 1) and 23 against Rutgers (December 8). At the end of the season he had started 33 out of 34 games, and he was second on the team in scoring behind senior guard Marquis Daniels with 13.3 points per game, and first in rebounding with 6.4 per game. He led the SEC in field goal percentage, shooting 55% from the field. Killingsworth also appeared for the first time in his career in the NCAA tournament. During the 2003 Tournament he played three games, debuting on March 21 against St. Joseph's, scoring 15 points in 36 minutes. He then followed scored 11 against Wake Forest, and 2 in the loss against Syracuse.

Killingsworth's junior season at Auburn saw him selected in the preseason All-SEC Second Team. He posted 18 points and 7 rebounds on November 21, 2003, against Western Kentucky, 19 points against Colorado State (December 1) and Georgia State (December 22) and 20 points against LSU on February 18, 2004. On February 14 he scored 23 points, 1 shy of his career high, against Ole Miss. At the end of the season he was the team leader in points (13.7) and rebounds (6.9), and he was the conference leader in field goal percentage for the second consecutive season at 58.7%. He was selected in the All-SEC Second Team by the coaches, and in the Third Team by Associated Press. He was the 10th player in Auburn history to reach 1,000 points and 500 rebounds in three seasons.

=== Indiana ===
After the 2003–04 season, head coach Cliff Ellis was fired from Auburn. In the summer of 2004, Killingsworth declared himself eligible for the 2004 NBA draft as an early entrant, but he did not hire an agent and later withdrew his name. Not wanting to play at Auburn without Ellis, Killingsworth decided to transfer to Indiana. He had to sit out the whole 2004–05 season due to NCAA transfer rules, and was eligible again to play his senior year for the 2005–06 season. Killingsworth chose to wear jersey number 5 at Indiana, where he was listed at 268 pounds (122 kg), up from his 235 pounds (107 kg) playing weight in his junior season at Auburn.

Under head coach Mike Davis, Killingsworth started all the 31 games of the season. On November 30, 2005, Killingsworth scored 34 points and posted 10 rebounds against #1 Duke, being defended by highly regarded player Shelden Williams during the ACC–Big Ten Challenge. Killingsworth was one of the key players of the Hoosiers team that season, leading the team in scoring (17.1 points), rebounding (7.8) and field goal percentage (54.2%). On February 11, 2006, against Iowa, Killingsworth recorded a career high in rebounds with 17 (4 offensive and 13 defensive). He scored 20 or more points on 10 occasions, with his career high of 34 in the aforementioned game against Duke, and 4 other games where he scored more than 26 points. He also had 10 games where he posted 10 or more rebounds. That year he was 7th in the Big Ten in points per game, and 5th in rebounds per game. He also had the chance to play in the NCAA Tournament for the second time in his career, and started both games (against San Diego State and Gonzaga). He was named an Honorable mention All-American by the Associated Press at the end of the season.

=== College statistics ===
Year	Team	GP	GS	MPG	FG%	3P%	FT%	RPG	APG	SPG	BPG	PPG
2001–02	Auburn	28	14	19.6	.529	.200	.521	4.2	0.9	0.3	0.4	7.8
2002–03	Auburn	34	33	27.5	.550	.361	.685	6.4	1.0	0.5	0.3	13.3
2003–04	Auburn	27	25	27.9	.587	.400	.642	6.9	1.0	0.8	0.6	13.7
2004–05	Indiana	Did not play – transfer										
2005–06	Indiana	31	31	28.5	.542	.190	.607	7.8	1.9	0.7	0.7	17.1
Career		120	103	26.0	.552	.306	.625	6.4	1.2	0.6	0.5	13.1

== Professional career ==
After the end of his senior season, Killingsworth was automatically eligible for the 2006 NBA draft. At the 2006 NBA Draft Combine, he was measured at 6 ft 5.5 in (1.97 m) without shoes, 6 ft 6.75 in (2.00 m) with shoes, weighing 266 pounds (121 kg) and a 7 ft 3 in (2.21 m) wingspan. He was not selected by an NBA franchise, and in July 2006 he signed with the Orlando Magic to compete in the NBA Summer League. During the Summer League in Orlando, Florida Killingsworth played 4 games, averaging 2 points and 0.8 rebounds in 9.5 minutes per game. He then moved to Europe and started his professional career with Turkish team Darüşşafaka. During the 2006–07 Turkish Basketball League he played 11 games, and averaged 17 points, 8.2 rebounds and 0.8 assists in 30.4 minutes per game. He then finished the 2006–07 season in South Korea, playing for KBL team Jeonju KCC Egis. He played 32 games in the 2006–07 KBL season, averaging 21.3 points, 11.1 rebounds and 2.1 assists in 32.4 minutes of playing time.

In July 2007 Killingsworth went back to Europe, and signed with Scafati Basket, a team of the Lega Basket Serie A in Italy. In 28 games he posted averages of 13.9 points, 6.3 rebounds and 1.8 steals per game in the 2007–08 season. In July 2008 he signed for New Basket Brindisi, a team of LegaDue, the second tier of Italian basketball. He played 30 games, posting averages of 19.3 points, 9 rebounds and 0.9 assists in 32.5 minutes per game.

Killingsworth joined Israeli team Barak Netanya in 2009, and spent there the 2009–10 Israeli Basketball Super League season. He averaged 18.4 points and 8.3 rebounds over 21 appearances that year. He then moved to Maccabi Haifa, where he played 20 games in the first half of the 2010–11 season, earning his first All-Star selection with averages of 17.1 points and 7.3 rebounds. He also participated in the 2010–11 FIBA EuroChallenge with Maccabi. He then transferred to Hapoel Gilboa Galil where he played 7 games (13.4 points, 6.3 rebounds per game). In 2011 he signed for Atléticos de San Germán of the Puerto Rican Baloncesto Superior Nacional, playing 1 regular season game and 2 playoff games. He then went back to Israel, signing with Ironi Ashkelon, where he spent the full 2011–12 season, averaging 16.2 points and 7.4 rebounds and earning his second All-Star game appearance. In 2012 Killingsworth transferred to Barak Netanya again, playing his second season with the team. In 27 games he averaged 17.4 points (his career high in Israel) and 7.8 rebounds during the 2012–13 Israeli Basketball Super League season.

In 2013 Killingsworth signed with Ukrainian team Donetsk, and played in two competitions with the team: the Ukrainian Basketball SuperLeague and the VTB United League. He established a VTB United League record for highest field goal percentage in a season with 66.9% during the 2013–14 VTB United League. He averaged 16.4 points and 6.8 rebounds in the Ukrainian league, and 17.2 points and 6.2 rebounds in the VTB United League. He then played in Bulgaria with PBC Academic Sofia, and joined Ural Yekaterinburg back in Ukraine. In 2015 he left Ukraine for France, and joined LNB Pro B team AS Monaco Basket, playing five games with averages of 8 points and 4.4 rebounds in 18 minutes per game. He later returned to Israel and played 23 games with Maccabi Kiryat Gat during the 2015–16 Israeli Basketball Super League, averaging 15.6 points and a career-high 8.5 rebounds in Israel, earning his third All-Star selection. He played during the 2015–16 VTB United League with BC Kalev, and also appeared during the 2015–16 FIBA Europe Cup. After playing for Maccabi Kiryat Gat in 5 games of the 2016–17 Israeli Basketball Super League, he retired in 2017 after three games in the Liga Leumit, the second level of basketball in Israel, with Ironi Ramat Gan.
