= Itzik Ohanon =

Israeli basketball player

Itzik Ohanon איציק אוחנון
Personal information
- Born: February 15, 1980 (age 46) Bat Yam, Israel
- Listed height: 6 ft 9 in (2.06 m)

Career information
- College: Saint Louis (2002–2005)
- NBA draft: 2005: undrafted
- Playing career: 1999–2011
- Position: Power forward

Career history
- 1999–2000: Hapoel Galil Elyon
- 2000–2001: Bnei Herzliya
- 2001–2002, 2005–2006: Hapoel Jerusalem
- 2006–2007: Ironi Ramat Gan
- 2007–2009: Leuven Bears
- 2009–2011: Ironi Ramat Gan
Medals
Men's basketball
Representing Israel
FIBA Europe Under-20 Championship
Silver medal – second place	2000 FIBA Europe Under-20 Championship	Israeli National Basketball Team

Yitzhak "Itzik" Ohanon (Hebrew: יצחק "איציק" אוחנון; born February 15, 1980) is an Israeli retired basketball player. Being 6 ft 9 in (2.06 m) tall, Ohanon had played the power forward and center positions.

He's the eldest brother of Israeli basketball players Eliav Ohanon and Liel Ohanon (who is a woman basketballer).

Nowadays he works as a senior administrator in an Israeli internet company.

== Early career ==
Ohanon grew up in Bat Yam to a family of Moroccan Jewish heritage and began playing basketball in a relatively late part of his teens. He played junior basketball for Maccabi Ra'anana, but made a name for himself when he signed with Hapoel Galil Elyon where he made his debut in the Israeli Premier League in the 1999/2000 season.

Ohanon was also part of the Israel national under-20 basketball team who defeated Pau Gasol's Spain and won the Silver Medal in the 2000 FIBA Europe Under-20 Championship. Some even compared the young Ohanaon to Tracy McGrady.

In the 2000/2001 season Ohanon had played for Bnei Herzliya, and in the 2001/2002 he signed a long-term contract with Hapoel Jerusalem B.C., where he reached the Semi-Finals of the European Saporta Cup with the team.

== College ball career ==
Ohanon was recruited by Brad Soderberg to Saint Louis University in 2002 and moved to the United States to compete for them in the Conference USA. Part of his studies was funded by a scholarship.

Ohanon made a news media noise in America and Israel when he spoke, at the beginning of his freshman year, against the possibility of the US attacking Iraq and the Persian Gulf as this may result in these countries attacking Israel as a response as Muslims view his homeland as "the messenger of America in the Middle East". He finished his first season with SLU with being defeated at the 1st round of the 2003 National Invitation Tournament.

In his second season with SLU he reached the 2nd round of the 2004 National Invitation Tournament.

In his third and last season with the University of Saint Louis (2004/05) he was announced the team's MVP and was honored in a ceremony held for him on campus. He led his team that year in rebounds per game (5.4) and was second in scoring (11.8 ppg), but his team finished in the third place in the conference that year.

Due to graduating college at 25 years of age, Ohanon, who was not NBA draft-able due to his age, decided to pursue a career in European basketball instead of trying making his way to the NBA through tryouts.

== Professional career ==
Upon graduating, Ohanon had negotiations with the Greek Basketball Premier Division club Makedonikos B.C. but this move was terminated by Hapoel Jerusalem (coached by Erez Edelstein) who had him signed from his last season in Israel with a commitment he would only play for them once he was done with his degree. He joined the team for the 2005/06 season but was forced to be a bench-warmer due to Arkadi Gaydamak's sponsorship to the club which brought both Israeli League top-guns (Meir Tapiro, Ido Kozikaro, Matan Naor and Erez Markovitch) and European-tier leading American players (Horace Jenkins, Mario Austin, Roger Mason Jr. and Tamar Slay) into the team who ended the year with reaching the 2006 ULEB Cup Semi-Finals and being the finalist for the Israeli Basketball Cup and Israeli Basketball Championship, where they lost both titles to the Euroleague power house, Maccabi Tel Aviv B.C.

Prior to 2006/07 Ohanon decided that his little playing time in Jerusalem was enough and signed with Ironi Ramat Gan of the rookie coach, Rubi Balinko, where he managed very well with a season which ended with 10.6 ppg and 4.3 rpg in 22 games in which the low-budget team managed to survive in the Premier League.

In the following summer of 2007 Ohanon was in the center of a media outrage led by the Israeli National Basketball Team coach at the time, Zvika Sherf, and the head of the Israel Basketball Association at the time, Irmi Ulmert, who accused Ohanon in ditching the National Team 2007 FIBA Europe Championship campaign because he preferred to join his wife as her protector in a modeling trip to South Africa.

On July 19, 2007, Ohanon had signed with the Basketball League Belgium Division I club Leuven Bears, that was coached by the Israeli Yaacov Jino, for two years. In his first year with the Bears, Ohanon was a notable player but his team finished the league in 9th place. His second season there was less successful and he participated in 21 games. However, his team finished the season in sixth place.

In the summer of 2009 Ohanon had decided to return to Israel and had signed again with Ironi Ramat Gan whom he favored due to his previous time there. The team was led by Dani Gut (Maccabi Tel Aviv B.C.'s head scout in the past) and had struggled in the league, till they've finished in the last place and were demoted to the Liga Leumit (2nd division). Ohanon had decided not to abandon the team and tried to help the club make its way back to the Premier League but was injured during the season. After the 2010/2011 season was over with his team not making it back to the top division, Ohanon had decided to retire from professional basketball after 9 years, at the age of 31, due to a recurrent injury.

== Personal life ==
While attending Saint Louis, Ohanon met Mala Bryan, a Caribbean-born African-American tall international model (1.80 m), who will become his first wife. The two had divorced and Ohanon is now married to an Israeli and lives in Karkur and now works in Hi-Tech.
