= Chris Watson (basketball) =

American-Israeli basketball player

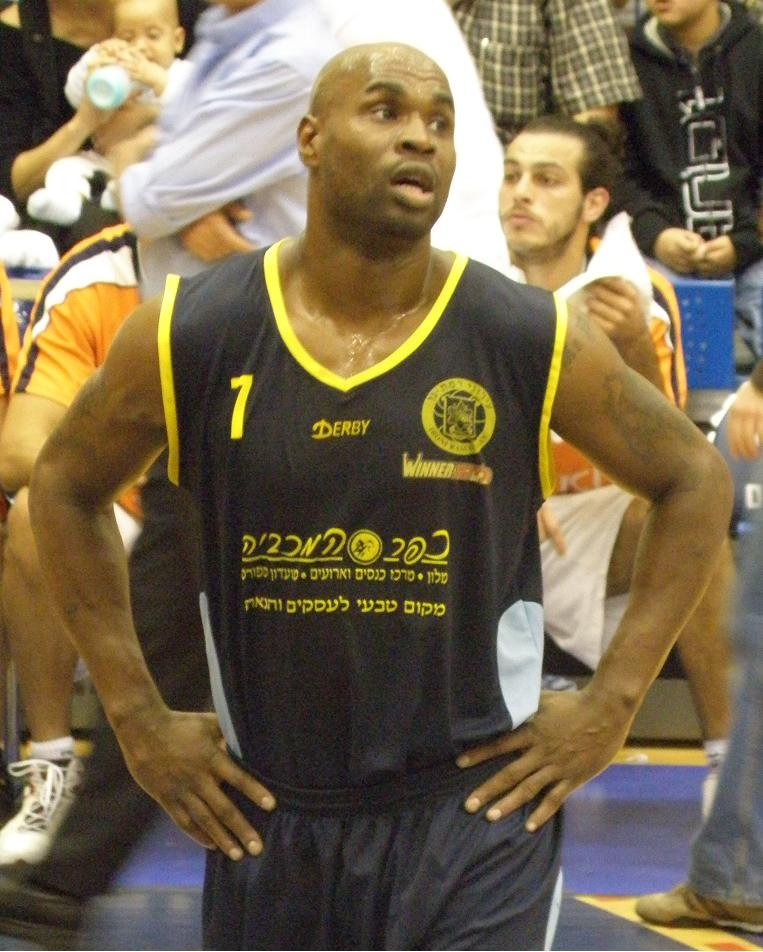

Personal information
- Born: July 16, 1975 (age 51)
- Listed height: 6 ft 7 in (2.01 m)

Career information
- High school: White Plains (White Plains, New York); Archbishop Stepinac (White Plains, New York)
- College: Niagara (1993–1997)
- NBA draft: 1997: undrafted
- Position: Power forward / center

Chris Watson (Hebrew: כריס ווטסון; born July 16, 1975) is an American–Israeli former basketball player, who has played on the Israel national basketball team, and whose positions have been power forward and center. He is 6 ft 7 in (201 cm) tall.

He attended Niagara University, where he led the Conference in 2-point field goals (165) in 1995–1996. He was inducted into the Niagara University Hall of Fame.

Watson has played professional basketball for two decades. He has played primarily in Israel (with Hapoel Tel Aviv, Hapoel Holon, Ironi Ramat Gan, GreenTops Netanya, and Ironi Ashkelon). Watson won the Israeli Championship with Hapoel Holon in 2007–2008, and again in 2008–2009. He was selected to the Israeli Basketball Premier League All-Star Game in 2011. Watson has twice played on the Israel national basketball team.

== Personal life ==
Watson was born in White Plains, New York. Watson attended White Plains High School, and then transferred to Archbishop Stepinac High School ('93). He married an Israeli woman, Roni, and in 2003 he became an Israeli citizen. He and his wife have a daughter, Dream.

== College ==
He attended Niagara University, where he played for the Purple Eagles basketball team in the Metro Atlantic Athletic Conference. He led the team in scoring in his final three seasons, and was third in the Conference in scoring in both his junior (16.8 points per game) and senior (17.4 points per game, as he led the Conference with a .568 field goal percentage) seasons. He also led the Conference in 2-point field goals (165) in 1995–1996, was second in 2-point field goals (167) in 1996–1997 His 16 field goals in a game against Siena on February 19, 1996, are tied for the most ever in a Conference game. He earned All-MAAC Tournament honors in both 1996 and 1997. He earned All-MAAC Second Team honors during the 1994–95 season, and was All-MAAC First Team in the 1995–96 season.

He finished his college career with 1,711 career points, fourth at the time in Niagara history. He graduated in 1996. In 2016 he was inducted into the Niagara University Hall of Fame.

== Professional basketball ==
Watson has played professional basketball for two decades. He has played in Belgium (Leuven Bears), Sweden, the United Kingdom (Birmingham Bullets), Uruguay, and Israel (Hapoel Tel Aviv, Hapoel Holon, Ironi Ramat Gan, GreenTops Netanya, and Ironi Ashkelon).

He played two seasons in Uruguay where he was the second-leading scorer of the Uruguayan League, two seasons in Sweden (KFUM Jamtland), and half a season in England.

Coming to Israel, he played in Hadera and then for Hapoel Tel Aviv. The following season Watson played for Migdal Ha'emek.

Watson won the Israeli Championship with Hapoel Holon in 2007–2008, and again in 2008–2009. He represented Israel at the Qualifications to European Championships 2009.

He played for Ironi Ramat Gan in the National League in 2009–2010. Watson was selected to the Israeli Basketball Premier League All-Star Game in 2011.

In 2013–14 Watson played for Ironi Kiryat Ata. He played for Hapoel Be'er Sheva in the Israel National League from 2014 to 2016.

Watson also played on the Israel national basketball team.
