= Shmulik Brener =

Israeli basketball player and coach (born 1981)

Shmulik Brener שמוליק ברנר
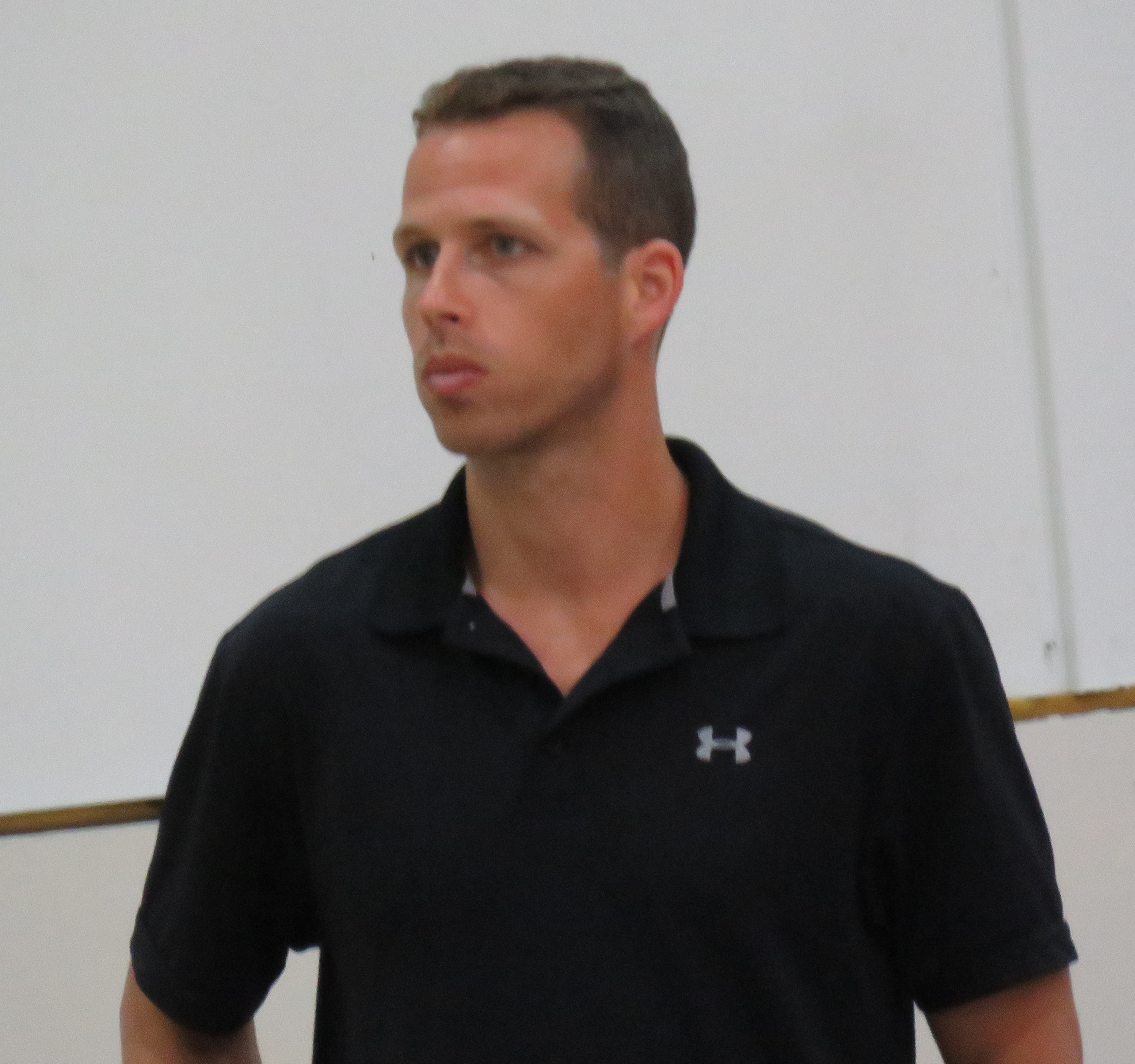

Personal information
- Born: March 8, 1981 (age 45)
- Listed height: 6 ft 2 in (1.88 m)
- Position: Point guard

Career highlights
- Israeli Basketball Premier League Quintet (2010)

Shmulik Brener (Hebrew: שמוליק ברנר; also romanized as Shmuel Brener; born March 8, 1981) is an Israeli former professional basketball player and coach. He played the point guard position. In 2010 Brener was named to the Israeli Basketball Premier League Quintet.

== Biography ==
Brener played for Hapoel Galil Elyon, Ironi Kiryat Ata, Haifa, Ironi Ramat Gan, Elitzur Netanya, BC Habikaa, and Hapoel Gilboa Galil.

In 2010, Brener was named to the Israeli Basketball Premier League Quintet. He played in the 2011 BSL All-Star Game.

After his playing career, Brener became head coach of Maccabi Rishon LeZion and Ironi Ramat Gan.
