= Jeremy Pargo =

American basketball player (born 1986)

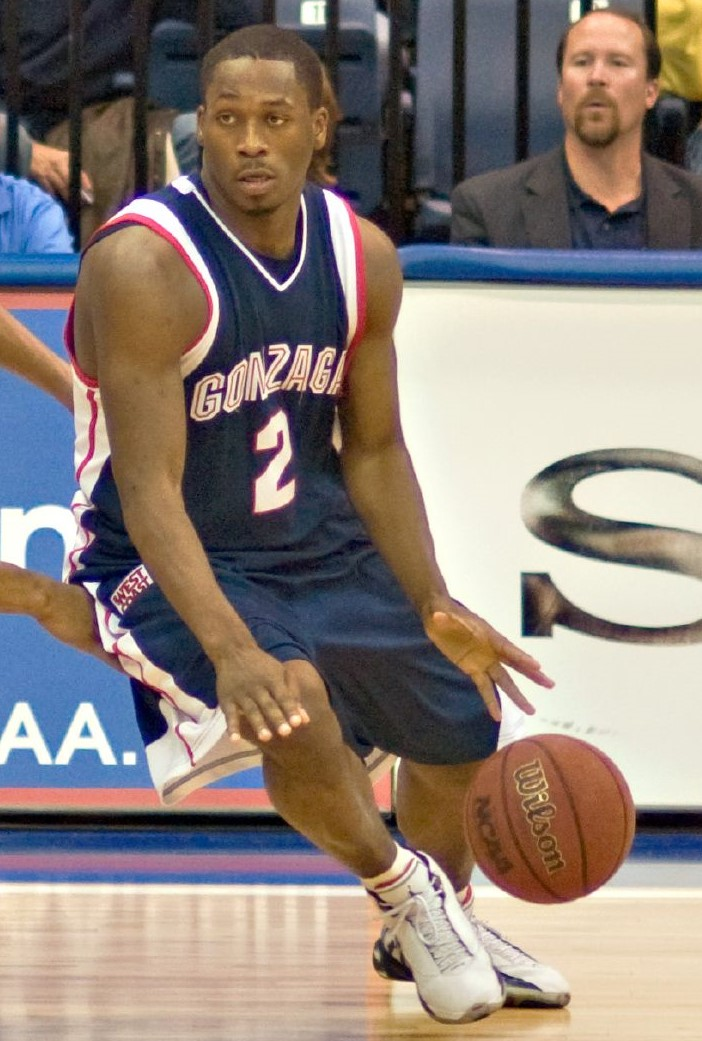
- Pargo playing for Gonzaga in 2008

No. 2 – Grindavík
- Position: Point guard
- League: Úrvalsdeild karla

Personal information
- Born: March 17, 1986 (age 40) Chicago, Illinois, U.S.
- Listed height: 6 ft 2 in (1.88 m)
- Listed weight: 219 lb (99 kg)

Career information
- High school: Paul Robeson (Chicago, Illinois)
- College: Gonzaga (2005–2009)
- NBA draft: 2009: undrafted
- Playing career: 2009–present

Career history
- 2009–2010: Hapoel Gilboa Galil
- 2010–2011: Maccabi Tel Aviv
- 2011–2012: Memphis Grizzlies
- 2012–2013: Cleveland Cavaliers
- 2013: Philadelphia 76ers
- 2013–2014: CSKA Moscow
- 2014–2015: Maccabi Tel Aviv
- 2015–2016: Zhejiang Lions
- 2016: Reyer Venezia Mestre
- 2016–2017: Shenzhen Leopards
- 2017–2018: Nanjing Monkey King
- 2018: Santa Cruz Warriors
- 2018: Champville SC
- 2018–2019: Maccabi Tel Aviv
- 2020: Golden State Warriors
- 2020: Santa Cruz Warriors
- 2020: Hapoel Jerusalem
- 2021: Maccabi Rishon LeZion
- 2021–2022: Napoli Basket
- 2022–2023: Windy City Bulls
- 2023: Real Betis
- 2023–2024: NBA G League Ignite
- 2025–present: Grindavík

Career highlights
- All-EuroLeague Second Team (2011); Russian League champion (2014); VTB League champion (2014); 4× Israeli League champion (2010, 2011, 2018, 2019); Israeli League assists leader (2015); 3x Israeli League Cup winner (2010, 2011, 2015); Israeli League Cup MVP (2010); 3x Israeli Cup champion (2010, 2011, 2015); Icelandic League champion (2026); Úrvalsdeild Playoffs MVP (2026); Israeli League slam dunk champion (2011); CBA assists leader (2016); WCC Player of the Year (2008); 2× First-team All-WCC (2007, 2008)
- Stats at NBA.com
- Stats at Basketball Reference
Medals
Men's basketball
Representing United States
FIBA AmeriCup
| Bronze medal – third place | 2022 Brazil |

Jeremy Raymon Pargo (born March 17, 1986) is an American professional basketball player. He played college basketball for the Gonzaga Bulldogs. In 2011 he reached the EuroLeague Final with Maccabi Tel Aviv, earning an All-EuroLeague Second Team selection in the process. He was the 2015 Israeli Basketball Premier League Assists Leader, and the 2016 Chinese Basketball Association assists leader. In 2026, he won the Icelandic championship and was named the Úrvalsdeild Playoffs MVP.

Pargo was a member of the United States national team during the 2022 FIBA AmeriCup where he won bronze.

He is the younger brother of former NBA player Jannero Pargo.

== Early life ==
Pargo attended Chicago's Paul Robeson High School.

== College career ==
Pargo played four seasons of college basketball for Gonzaga University's Gonzaga Bulldogs. In 2008 in his junior season, he was voted the WCC Player of the Year. The following year, he was featured on the cover of Sports Illustrated magazine for the 2009 March Madness issue.

During his collegiate career, Pargo averaged 9.3 points, 3.4 rebounds, and 4.3 assists per game. The Bulldogs were very successful during Pargo's time at the school, qualifying for the 2006, 2007, 2008 and 2009 NCAA tournaments.

== Professional career ==
=== 2009–10 season ===
After going undrafted in the 2009 NBA draft, Pargo participated in the 2009 Las Vegas NBA Summer League, as a member of the Detroit Pistons' summer league squad, alongside former Gonzaga teammate Austin Daye. He also played in the Orlando Pro Summer League for the Orlando Magic's summer league squad. He did not secure a contract, however.

In his first professional year, Pargo played for Hapoel Gilboa Galil Elyon of the Israeli Basketball Super League, averaging 14.1 points, 2.9 rebounds, 4.5 assists, and 2.7 turnovers per game. He was a home crowd favorite because of his electrifying dunks over bigger defenders. He won the 2009-10 Israeli Super League championship.

=== 2010–11 season ===
In 2010, Pargo participated in the Orlando Pro Summer League for the Charlotte Bobcats, and then later in the Las Vegas NBA Summer League, as a member of the Minnesota Timberwolves. On August 26, 2010, Pargo replaced Mikhail Torrance, who was suffering from a heart condition, signing a one-year contract with EuroLeague giants Maccabi Tel Aviv. After a promising start, he emerged as one of the team's main players, especially after Doron Perkins's season-ending injury. He helped Maccabi to reach the EuroLeague Final, earning an All-EuroLeague Second Team selection in the process. His team lost in the EuroLeague Finals to Panathinaikos, by a score of 78–70.

=== 2011–12 season ===
On May 24, 2011, Pargo signed a new two-year contract extension with Maccabi. However, he broke the contract, and on December 10, 2011, he signed a two-year contract with the NBA's Memphis Grizzlies, with his successful EuroLeague season not having gone unnoticed.

=== 2012–13 season ===
On July 25, 2012, he was traded to the Cleveland Cavaliers, along with a 2014 second round draft pick, in exchange for D. J. Kennedy.

On January 22, 2013, Pargo was waived by the Cavaliers.

On February 7, 2013, Pargo was signed to a ten-day contract by the Philadelphia 76ers. On February 18, 2013, Pargo was signed by the 76ers for the rest of the 2012–13 season. He was waived on April 1, 2013, when the team signed Justin Holiday.

=== 2013–14 season ===
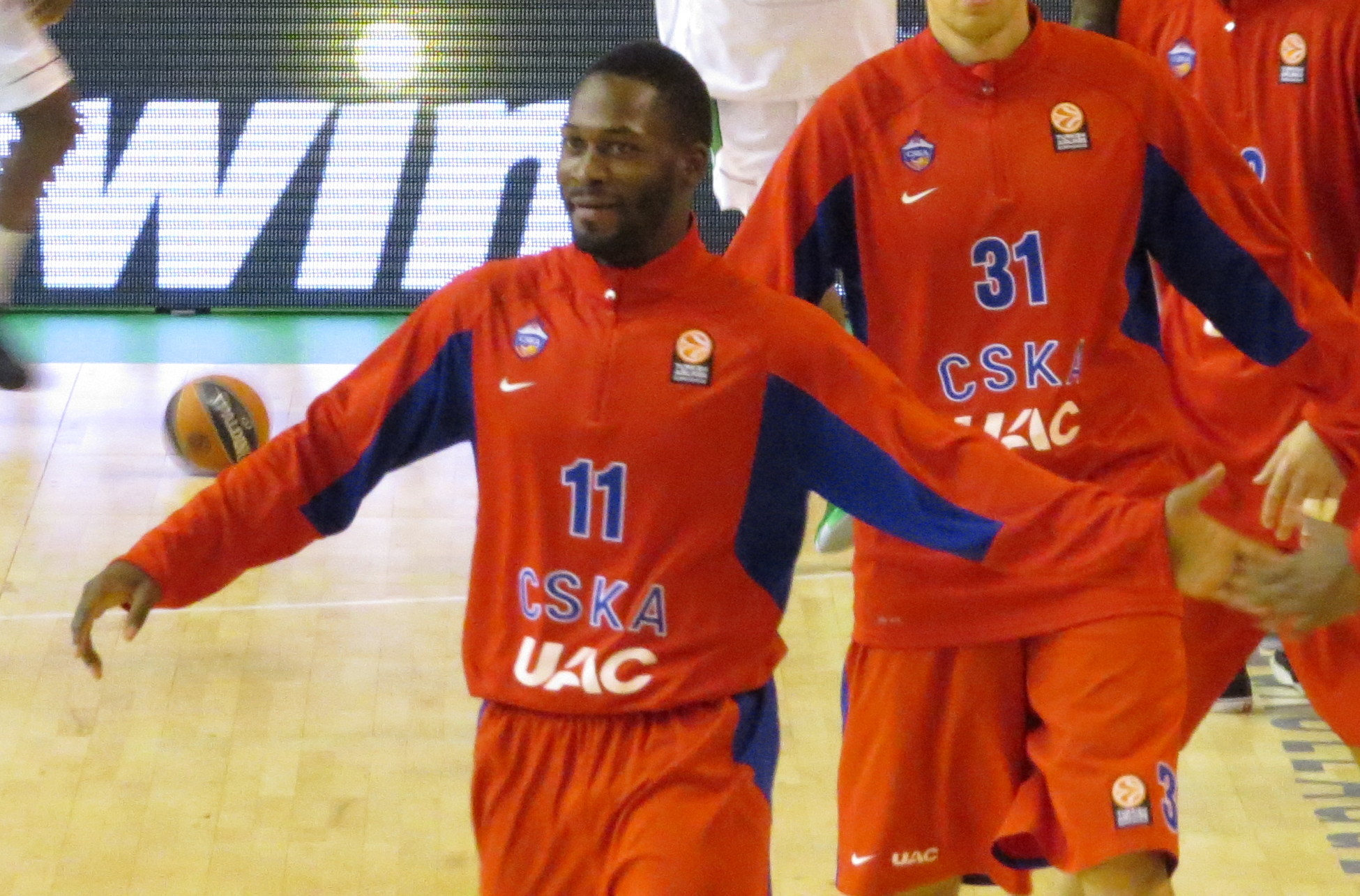
Pargo with CSKA Moscow, 2013

In June 2013, he signed a two-year contract worth $5.2 million net income (€4 million) with the Russian club CSKA Moscow.

=== 2014–15 season ===
On July 24, 2014, Pargo and CSKA Moscow reached an agreement to part ways. Later that day, Pargo signed a two-year deal with his former club Maccabi Tel Aviv.

=== 2015–16 season ===
On July 4, 2015, he parted ways with Maccabi, signing with the Chinese club Zhejiang Lions for the 2015–16 CBA season. On April 27, 2016, Pargo joined the Italian club Reyer Venezia, for the remainder of the 2015–16 season.

=== 2016–17 season ===
In July 2016, Pargo signed with the Chinese club Shenzhen Leopards.

=== 2017–18 season ===
On December 12, 2017, Pargo signed with the Chinese club Nanjing Monkey King.

On February 26, 2018, Pargo joined the Santa Cruz Warriors of the NBA G League. One month later, Pargo signed with the Lebanese team Champville SC.

On April 25, 2018, Pargo returned for a third stint in Maccabi Tel Aviv, signing for the rest of the season. On May 17, 2018, Pargo recorded 26 points, scoring 20 points in the fourth quarter, along with four rebounds and four assists, leading Maccabi to a 98–95 win over Ironi Nes Ziona. He was subsequently named Israeli League Round 32 MVP. On June 8, 2018, Pargo was named 2018 Israeli League Quarterfinals MVP. Pargo made a key contribution to Maccabi's 2018 Israeli League Championship title.

=== 2018–19 season ===
On July 11, 2018, Pargo signed a one-year contract extension with Maccabi Tel Aviv. Pargo won the 2019 Israeli League Championship with Maccabi, winning the Israeli League title for two consecutive years.

=== 2019–20 season ===
On November 7, 2019, Pargo joined the Santa Cruz Warriors of the NBA G League for a second stint. He scored 37 points against the South Bay Lakers on December 10.

On February 8, 2020, Pargo signed a 10-day contract with the Golden State Warriors. In his debut the same day against the Los Angeles Lakers, Pargo appeared in an NBA game for the first time in six years, 316 days — the sixth-longest gap between game appearances in NBA history. Pargo posted 15 points in a 112–106 loss to the Phoenix Suns.

=== 2020–21 season ===
On June 3, 2020, Pargo signed with Hapoel Jerusalem.

On February 15, 2021, he signed with Maccabi Rishon LeZion of the Israeli Premier League.

=== 2021–22 season ===
On November 1, 2021, Pargo signed with Napoli Basket of the Italian Lega Basket Serie A (LBA). On January 10, 2022, he was traded from the Santa Cruz Warriors to the Windy City Bulls. Napoli and Pargo mutually parted ways on January 25, allowing him to return to the USA. He averaged 9.6 points and 3.6 assists per game in his tenure with the Italian team.

=== 2022–23 season ===
On January 1, 2023, Pargo was reacquired by the Windy City Bulls. On April 11, 2023, he signed with Real Betis of the Liga ACB.

=== 2023–24 season ===
On August 28, 2023, Pargo signed with the NBA G League Ignite.

=== Grindavík (2025–present) ===
In January 2025, Pargo signed with Grindavík of the Úrvalsdeild karla. In his debut, he scored 25 point in a 95–104 win against Þór Þorlákshöfn. He appeared in six regular season games where he averaged 25.7 points, 4.3 rebounds and 7.3 assists. In the first round of the playoffs, he helped Grindavík knock out reigning national champions Valur, 3–1.

After not starting the 2025–2026 season with Grindavík, he rejoined the team in January 2026, replacing Khalil Shabazz. He played the final six games of the regular season, helping Grindavík to the best record in the league. On 18 May 2026, he won the Icelandic championship and was named the Playoffs MVP after Grindavík defeated Tindastóll 3-1 in the Úrvalsdeild finals. With starters Ólafur Ólafsson, Deandre Kane and Daniel Mortensen out due to injures, Pargo scored 48 points in the championship clinching game, making 10 of 16 three point shots.

In September 2026, it was announced that Pargo would return to Grindavík for one more season.

=== The Basketball Tournament ===
In the summer of 2017, Pargo played in The Basketball Tournament (TBT)—a single-elimination winner-take-all tournament—for team Few Good Men (Gonzaga alumni). He averaged 13.3 points per game (PPG) and helped take the team to the Super 16 round of TBT 2017, where they lost to Team Challenge ALS, 77–60. In TBT 2018, Pargo played for Overseas Elite, the three-time defending champion. In six games, he averaged 7.7 PPG, 3.3 assists per game and 2.3 rebounds per game. Overseas Elite reached the championship game and defeated Eberlein Drive, 70–58, for their fourth consecutive TBT title. In TBT 2019, Pargo and Overseas Elite advanced to the semifinals where they suffered their first-ever defeat, losing to Carmen's Crew, 71–66.

=== 3-on-3 basketball ===
In 2026, Pargo joined Boston Ball Hogs of the BIG3.

On 22nd August 2026, Pargo hit a 4-Point shot to overcome a 2-point deficit and win the BIG3 Championship.

== National team career ==
Pargo played for the United States national team during the 2022 FIBA AmeriCup where the team finished third. He appeared in 6 games, averaging 8.8 points and 5.7 assists per game.

== Career statistics ==
Legend
| GP | Games played | GS | Games started | MPG | Minutes per game |
| FG% | Field-goal percentage | 3P% | 3-point field-goal percentage | FT% | Free-throw percentage |
| RPG | Rebounds per game | APG | Assists per game | SPG | Steals per game |
| BPG | Blocks per game | PPG | Points per game | PIR | Performance index rating |
| **Bold** | Career high |

=== NBA ===
==== Regular season ====
| Year | Team | GP | GS | MPG | FG% | 3P% | FT% | RPG | APG | SPG | BPG | PPG |
|---|---|---|---|---|---|---|---|---|---|---|---|---|
| 2011–12 | Memphis | **44** | 5 | 9.6 | .333 | .263 | .596 | .8 | 1.3 | .3 | .0 | 2.9 |
| 2012–13 | Cleveland | 25 | **11** | **17.9** | **.401** | .316 | **.683** | **1.3** | 2.6 | **.5** | .1 | 7.8 |
| 2012–13 | Philadelphia | 14 | 0 | 14.9 | .381 | .412 | .667 | 1.2 | 2.0 | .1 | .0 | 4.9 |
| 2019–20 | Golden State | 3 | 0 | 14.7 | .500 | **.429** | .000 | 1.0 | **2.7** | .3 | .0 | **8.3** |
| Career | | 86 | 16 | 13.1 | .379 | .319 | .644 | 1.0 | 1.8 | .3 | .0 | 4.8 |

=== EuroLeague ===
| * | Led the league |

| Year | Team | GP | GS | MPG | FG% | 3P% | FT% | RPG | APG | SPG | BPG | PPG | PIR |
|---|---|---|---|---|---|---|---|---|---|---|---|---|---|
| 2010–11 | Maccabi | 22 | 22* | 30.0 | **.463** | **.363** | .676 | **3.5** | 4.3 | **1.0** | .0 | 13.0 | 12.5 |
| 2013–14 | CSKA Moscow | **27** | 10 | 15.4 | .452 | .257 | .652 | 1.0 | 1.4 | .4 | **.1** | 5.0 | 3.4 |
| 2014–15 | Maccabi | **27** | **24** | **32.0*** | .402 | .282 | **.759** | 3.2 | **5.4** | .2 | **.1** | **13.7** | **13.0** |
| 2018–19 | Maccabi | 11 | 2 | 19.2 | .238 | .216 | .583 | 1.7 | 2.7 | .3 | **.1** | 5.5 | 1.0 |
| Career | | 87 | 58 | 24.7 | .411 | .293 | .698 | 2.4 | 3.5 | .5 | .1 | 9.8 | 8.3 |
