= Nitzan Hanochi =

Israeli basketball player (born 1986)

Nitzan Hanochi ניצן חנוכי
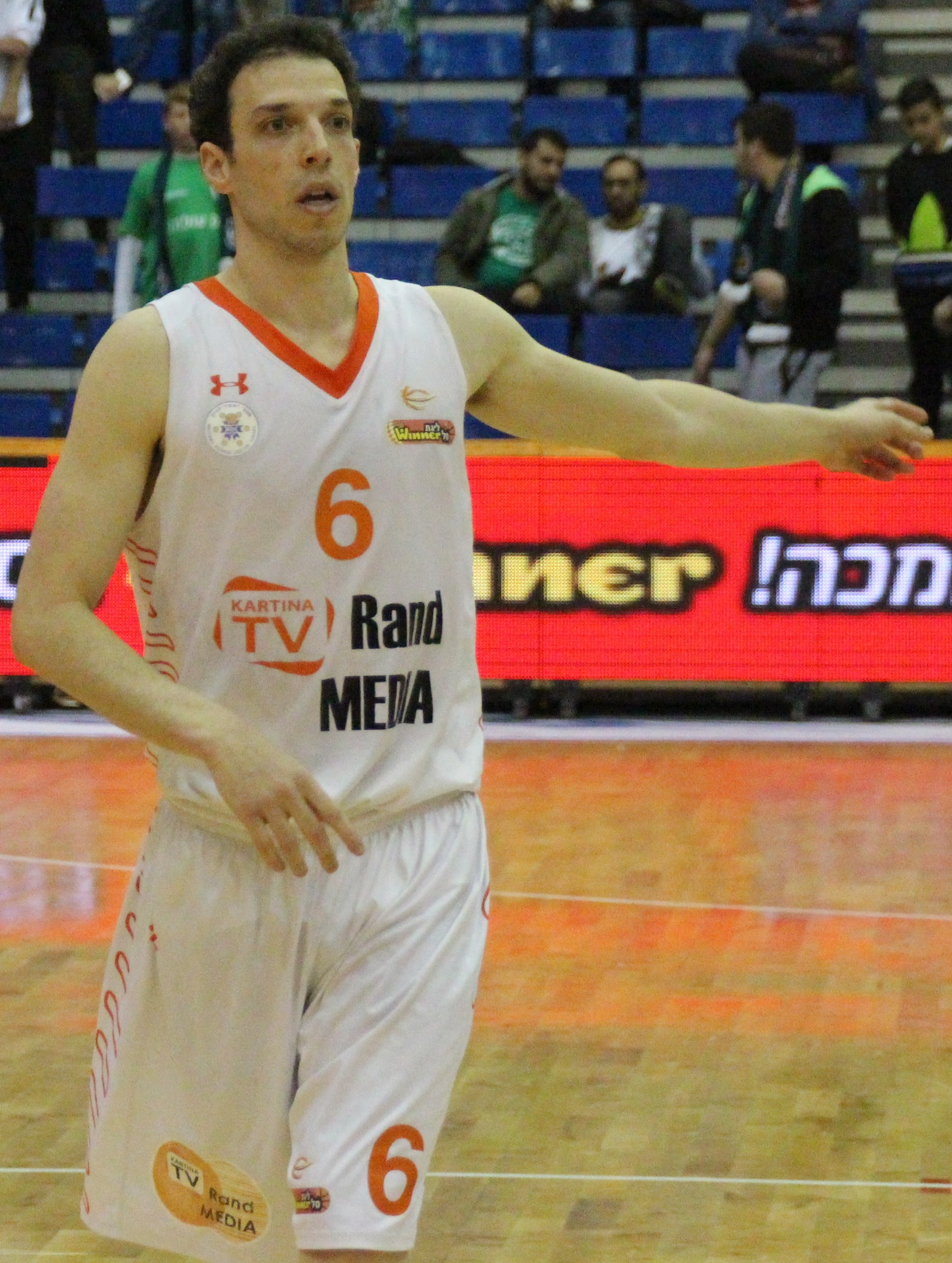
- Hanochi playing for Rishon LeZion in March 2017

Free Agent
- Position: Shooting guard

Personal information
- Born: 10 June 1986 (age 40) Ra'anana, Israel
- Listed height: 1.94 m (6 ft 4 in)

Career information
- High school: Metro West, Ra'anana
- Playing career: 2004–present

Career history
- 2004–2008: Bnei Hasharon
- 2004–2005: →Maccabi Giva'at Shmuel
- 2008–2009: Ironi Nahariya
- 2009–2010: Hapoel Afula
- 2010–2013: Maccabi Rishon LeZion
- 2013–2014: Hapoel Eilat
- 2014–2018: Maccabi Rishon LeZion
- 2018–2021: Bnei Herzliya

Career highlights
- Israeli League champion (2016); Israeli League Defensive Player of the Year (2012); Israeli League Most Improved Player (2011); 2× Israeli League All-Star (2012, 2013)

Nitzan Yehuda Hanochi (Hebrew: ניצן יהודה חנוכי; born 10 June 1986) is an Israeli professional basketball player who last played for Bnei Herzliya of the Israeli Basketball Premier League. He was named the Israeli Basketball Premier League Most Improved Player in 2011, and the Israeli Basketball Premier League Defensive Player of the Year in 2012.

== Early life ==
Hanochi was born in Ra'anana, he played for Maccabi Ra'anana youth teams.

Hanochi also played high school basketball for Metro West High School team in Ra'anana and led them to win the national championship in the 2003–04 season.

== Professional career ==
In 2004, Hanochi started his professional career with Bnei Hasharon, but later was loaned to Maccabi Giva'at Shmuel.

On 27 July 2006, Hanochi signed a two-year contract extension with Bnei Hasharon.

On 5 July 2008, Hanochi signed with Ironi Nahariya for the 2008–09 season, joining his former head coach Yakov Gino.

On 13 August 2009, Hanochi signed with Hapoel Afula for the 2009–10 season.

On 5 July 2010, Hanochi signed a three-year deal with Maccabi Rishon LeZion, under head coach Effi Birnbaum. On 12 February 2011, Hanochi was named Player of the Month for games played in January. On 19 May 2011, Hanochi was named Most Improved Player of the 2010–11 Israeli League season. In his second season with Rishon LeZion, Hanochi became the team's captain and later was named Israeli League All-Star and the Defensive Player of the Year.

On 9 July 2013, Hanochi signed with Hapoel Eilat for the 2013–14 season.

On 9 July 2014, Hanochi returned for a second stint in Maccabi Rishon LeZion, signing a two-year contract.

On 14 March 2016, Hanochi signed a two-year contract extension with Rishon LeZion. That season, Hanochi helped Rishon LeZion to win the 2016 Israeli League Championship.

On 18 December 2017, Hanochi missed Rishon LeZion's game against Bnei Herzliya due to injury, Hanochi's absence ended his streak of consecutive games played at 242—the longest longest streak in the history of the Israeli Basketball Premier League.

On 12 July 2018, Hanochi returned to Bnei Herzliya for a second stint, signing a three-year deal.

== Israeli national team ==
Hanochi was a member of the Israeli national team at the Eurobasket 2013.

Hanochi was also a member of the Israeli Under-18 and Under-20 national teams.
