= Guy Pnini =

Israeli basketball player (born 1983)

Guy Pnini גיא פניני
- Pnini with Maccabi Tel Aviv in September 2026

Maccabi Tel Aviv
- Title: Assistant coach
- League: Ligat HaAl; EuroLeague

Personal information
- Born: September 4, 1983 (age 43) Tel Aviv, Israel
- Listed height: 2.01 m (6 ft 7 in)
- Listed weight: 94 kg (207 lb)

Career information
- NBA draft: 2005: undrafted
- Playing career: 2001–2023
- Position: Small forward
- Number: 10, 22

Career history

Playing
- 2001–2002: Maccabi Ra'anana
- 2002–2006: Bnei Hasharon
- 2006–2008: Hapoel Jerusalem
- 2008–2009: FMP
- 2009: Keravnos
- 2009–2017: Maccabi Tel Aviv
- 2017–2022: Hapoel Holon
- 2022–2023: Maccabi Tel Aviv

Coaching
- 2023–present: Maccabi Tel Aviv (assistant)

Career highlights
- EuroLeague champion (2014); 4× Israeli League champion (2011, 2012, 2014, 2022); 11× Israeli Cup winner (2007, 2008, 2010–2018); All-Israeli League First Team (2010); All-Israeli League Second Team (2019); Israeli League Sixth Man of the Year (2021); 4× Israeli League All-Star (2011, 2013–2014, 2019)

Guy Pnini (Hebrew: גיא פניני; born September 4, 1983) is an Israeli former professional basketball player and basketball coach, currently serving as an assistant coach for Maccabi Tel Aviv of the Israeli Basketball Premier League and the EuroLeague. Standing at a height of 6 ft 7 in (2.01 m) tall, he played at the small forward position.

== Early life ==
Pnini is Jewish, and was born in Israel.

== Professional career ==
=== Maccabi Ra'anana / Bnei Hasharon (2001–2006) ===
After the 2001 season, Pnini began his professional career, by playing with Maccabi Ra'anana in the Israeli Super League.

Maccabi Rannana merged with Bnei Herzeliya and became Bnei Hasharon. Pnini became the captain of the team in the 2004–05 season, and in 2006, he was chosen to the Israeli Super League's "All Israeli League Team".

At the 2005 Maccabiah Games, Pnini was named tournament MVP as Team Israel won a gold medal in men's basketball.

=== Hapoel Jerusalem (2006–2008) ===
In the 2006–07 season, Pnini signed with Hapoel Jerusalem, and with them, he won two Israeli State Cups – one in 2007, after beating his former team, Bnei Hasharon, in the final, and the other in 2008, after beating Maccabi Tel Aviv. In Jerusalem, Pnini became one of the most dominant Israeli players in the league.

=== Serbia / Cyprus (2008–2009) ===
Before the 2008–09 season, with one year remaining on his contract with Hapoel Jerusalem, Pnini signed a 3-year contract with Maccabi Tel Aviv, starting from the 2009–10 season. Hapoel Jerusalem appealed against the agreement to the IBA court, claiming that it was an unsportsmanlike situation that their player had a signed contract with their league opponents. The IBA court determined that Pnini had to spend the 2008–09 season playing outside of the Israeli Super League.

After the verdict, Pnini signed with the Serbian team KK FMP. In January 2009, Pnini left KK FMP, and signed with the Cypriot team Keravnos, where he reached the Cyprus Basketball Division final, where his team lost 3:1 to APOEL Nicosia.

=== Maccabi Tel Aviv (2009–2017) ===
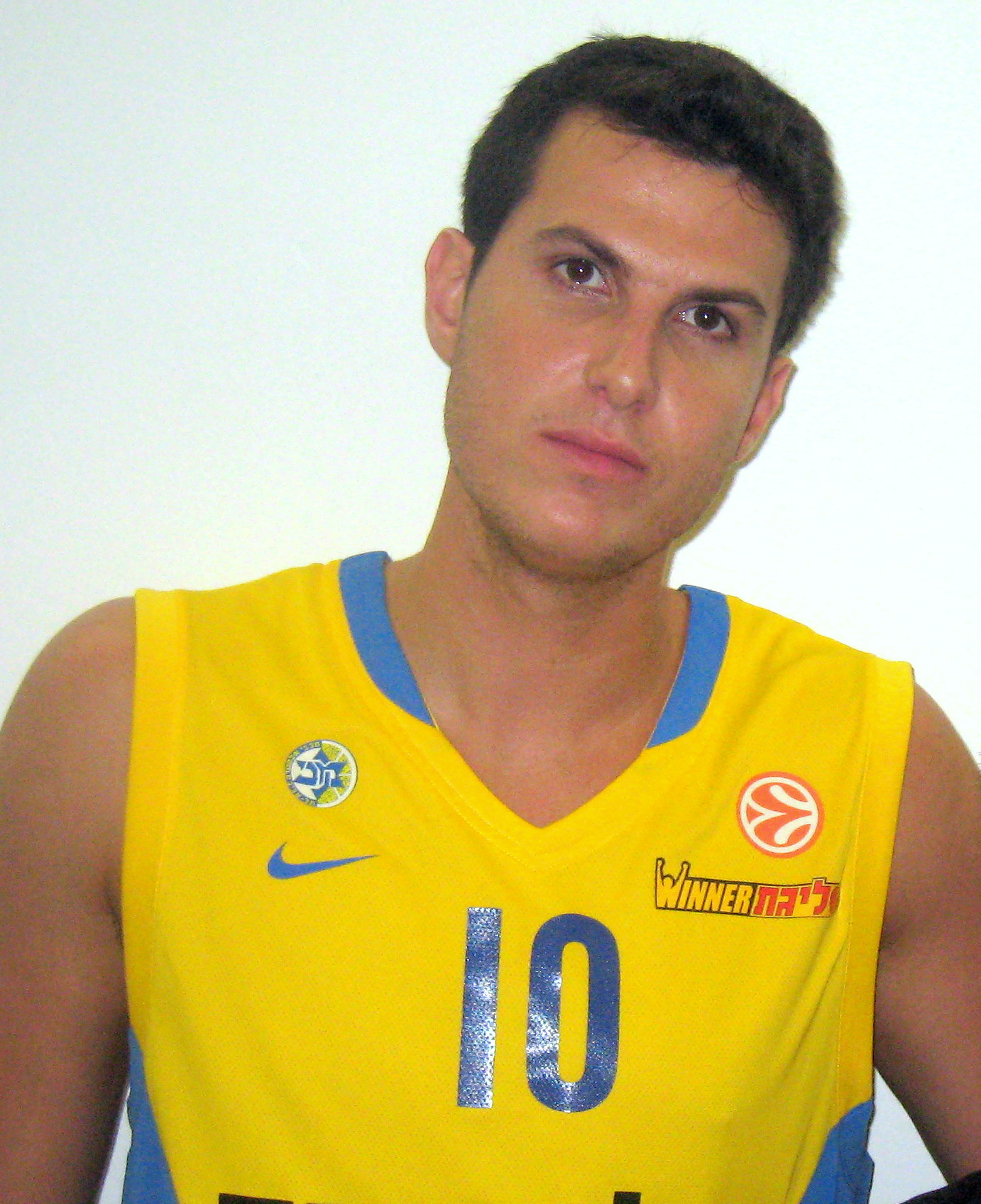
Guy Pnini

After spending a season abroad, Pnini was allowed to fulfill his 3-year contract with Maccabi Tel Aviv, and he joined the team for the 2009–10 season. In December 2012, he was fined NIS 100,000, stripped of his role as the team's captain, and suspended, as the result of a Nazi slur that he used against another player, during a game.

On July 1, 2017, after 8 seasons with the club, Maccabi Tel Aviv have parted ways with Pnini.

=== Hapoel Holon (2017–2022) ===
On July 3, 2017, Pnini signed a two-year deal with Hapoel Holon. On February 15, 2018, Pnini recorded 15 points, along with 2 rebounds and 2 assists and helped Holon to win the 2018 Israeli State Cup after an 88–86 win over his former team Maccabi Tel Aviv in the final match, becoming the first player who won the Israeli State Cup with three different teams. On March 1, 2018, Pnini was named Israeli Player of the Month for games played in February.

On January 3, 2019, Pnini signed a two-year contract extension with Hapoel Holon. On April 4, 2019, Pnini was named Israeli Player of the Month after averaging 12.4 points and 5.2 assists, shooting 46 percent from three-point range in four games played in March. On April 12, 2019, Pnini won the three-point shootout during the 2019 Israeli All-Star Event.

=== Maccabi Tel Aviv (2022–2023) ===
On June 23, 2022, Pnini signed with Maccabi Tel Aviv of the Israeli Premier League and the EuroLeague.

On August 7, 2023, Pnini announced his retirement from professional basketball and joined Maccabi's coaching staff, under head coach Oded Kattash.

== National team career ==
Pnini is a member of the Israeli National Team, he participated at the 2007, 2009, 2011, 2013 and 2017 EuroBasket tournaments.

== Career statistics ==
Legend
GP	Games played	GS	Games started	MPG	Minutes per game
FG%	Field-goal percentage	3P%	3-point field-goal percentage	FT%	Free-throw percentage
RPG	Rebounds per game	APG	Assists per game	SPG	Steals per game
BPG	Blocks per game	PPG	Points per game	PIR	Performance index rating
**Bold**	Career high

=== EuroLeague ===
†	Denotes seasons in which Pnini won the EuroLeague

Year	Team	GP	GS	MPG	FG%	3P%	FT%	RPG	APG	SPG	BPG	PPG	PIR
2009–10	Maccabi	20	11	15.2	.414	.400	.680	1.8	.9	.5	**.1**	4.7	3.1
2010–11	Maccabi	22	5	19.8	.486	.458	.778	1.7	1.1	.4	0	7.2	6.0
2011–12	Maccabi	19	0	12.6	.367	.317	**.889**	1.3	1.1	.4	**.1**	3.4	3.3
2012–13	Maccabi	23	2	13.4	.431	.302	.810	1.2	1	.3	**.1**	4.0	3.7
2013–14†	Maccabi	27	**20**	18.4	.424	.413	.583	1.8	**1.8**	.4	**.1**	5.6	5.2
2014–15	Maccabi	4	1	**20.7**	**.565**	**.467**	.625	**2.0**	1.5	**.8**	—	**9.5**	**7.5**
2015–16	Maccabi	10	2	15.4	.472	**.467**	.833	1.1	1.0	.4	—	5.3	4.6
2016–17	Maccabi	**29**	1	12.7	.365	.277	.533	1.6	1.2	.3	—	2.6	3.1
Career		154	42	15.5	.430	.387	.704	1.5	1.2	.4	.0	4.7	4.2
