= 2009–10 Israeli Basketball Super League =

2009–2010 Israeli Basketball Super League season
- League: Israeli Basketball Super League
- Sport: Basketball
- Duration: 24 October 2009 – 27 May 2010
- Games: 158
- Teams: 12
- TV partner(s): Sport 5, Israel 10

Regular Season
- League champions: Maccabi Tel Aviv
- Runners-up: Hapoel Jerusalem
- Top scorer: Justin Dentmon (Hapoel Afula)
- Relegated to Ligat Leumit: Ironi Nahariya, Hapoel Afula ironi Ramat Gan

Final four
- Champions: Gilboa/Galil
- Runners-up: Maccabi Tel Aviv

Israeli Basketball Super League seasons
- ← 2008–2009 2010–2011 →

The 2009–2010 Israeli Basketball Super League (Also known as Ligat Winner) was the 56th season of the top basketball league in Israel. The season began on 24 October 2009. The final four event was played on 25–27 May 2010.

Gilboa/Galil won its second Israeli championship.

== Format ==
Each out of the 12 participating teams played 22 regular league games, one home game and one away game against each other team. The top eight teams qualified to the playoff, where they play best-of-5 series decided by the rankings at the end of the regular season (first against eighth, second against seventh and so on).

The four last ranked team competed in a best-of-5 series relegation playoff (9th VS 12th, 10th VS 11th) and the two losers were relegated to Liga Leumit 2010–11.

== Regular season ==
	Team	Pld	W	L	PF	PA	Diff	Pts	Qualification or relegation
1.	Maccabi Tel Aviv	22	21	1	2075	1692	383	43	2010–11 Euroleague Group stage
2.	Hapoel Jerusalem	22	14	8	1913	1827	86	36	2010–11 ULEB Eurocup Qualifying Round
3.	Hapoel Gilboa Galil Elyon	22	14	8	1842	1717	125	36	2010-11 Euroleague First qualifying round
4.	Maccabi Haifa	22	14	8	1758	1649	109	36	2010-11 EuroChallenge Qualifying Round
5.	Elitzur Maccabi Netanya	22	14	8	1795	1831	−36	36	2010-11 EuroChallenge Group stage
6.	Ironi Ashkelon	22	11	11	1753	1784	−31	33	
7.	Maccabi Rishon LeZion	22	10	12	1758	1796	−38	32	
8.	Bnei HaSharon	22	9	13	1712	1705	+7	31	
9.	Ironi Nahariya	22	7	15	1672	1779	−107	29	Relegation to the 2010-11 Liga Leumit
10.	Hapoel Afula	22	7	15	1811	1979	−168	29	Relegation to the 2010-11 Liga Leumit
11.	Ironi Ramat Gan	22	6	16	1703	1906	−203	28	Relegation to the 2010-11 Liga Leumit
12.	Hapoel Holon	22	6	16	1690	1817	−127	28	

Qualification to Playoffs
Qualification to Relegation Playoffs

Pld – Played; W – Won; L – Lost; PF – Points for; PA – Points against; Diff – Difference; Pts – Points.

== Playoff ==
The higher ranked team hosts games 1, 3 and 5 (if necessary). The lower ranked team hosts games 2 and 4 (if necessary).

Team #1	Agg.	Team #2	Game 1 2–3 May	Game 2 5–6 May	Game 3 9–10 May	Game 4 13 May	Game 5 17 May
Maccabi Tel Aviv (1)	3–2	Bnei HaSharon (8)	79–89	91–58	104–82	81–91	71–69
Hapoel Jerusalem (2)	3–1	Maccabi Rishon LeZion (7)	73–69	75–64	78–87 (OT)	62–56	
Galil/Gilboa (3)	3–0	Ironi Ashkelon (6)	92–81	84–73	94–76		
Maccabi Haifa (4)	1–3	Elitzur Maccabi Netanya (5)	76–88	75–73	75–77	71–75	

== Final four ==
Semifinals; 25 May
Hapoel Jerusalem	69
Gilboa/Galil	79
Maccabi Tel Aviv	104
Elitzur Maccabi Netanya	78

Final; 27 May
Gilboa/Galil	90
Maccabi Tel Aviv	77
Third place
Hapoel Jerusalem	95
Elitzur Maccabi Netanya	82

== Relegation playoff ==
The higher ranked team hosts games 1, 3 and 5 (if necessary). The lower ranked team hosts games 2 and 4 (if necessary).

Team #1	Agg.	Team #2	Game 1 2–3 May	Game 2 5–6 May	Game 3 9–10 May	Game 4 13 May	Game 5 16–17 May
Ironi Nahariya (9)	2–3	Hapoel Holon (12)	73–68	70–76	82–76	55–71	64–75
Hapoel Afula (10)	3–2	Ironi Ramat Gan (11)	71–75	84–91	96–92	79–71	86–81

Ironi Ramat Gan and Ironi Nahariya were relegated to Liga Leumit.

== See also ==
- 2009–10 Israeli Basketball State Cup
- Winner Cup 2009
