= Dwayne Mitchell =

American basketball player

Personal information
- Born: August 24, 1982 (age 44) New Orleans, Louisiana, U.S.
- Listed height: 6 ft 5 in (1.96 m)
- Listed weight: 210 lb (95 kg)

Career information
- High school: John F. Kennedy (New Orleans, Louisiana)
- College: Auburn (2001–2002); Louisiana (2003–2006)
- NBA draft: 2006: undrafted
- Playing career: 2006–2018
- Position: Shooting guard

Career history
- 2006–2007: Paris Basket Racing
- 2007–2008: Iowa Energy
- 2008: Brose Baskets Bamberg
- 2008–2009: Los Angeles D-Fenders
- 2009–2010: Hapoel Holon
- 2010–2011: Maccabi Rishon LeZion
- 2011–2012: Ironi Ashkelon
- 2012–2013: MBC Mykolaiv
- 2013: Maccabi Rishon LeZion
- 2014: Bucaneros de La Guaira
- 2014: Westchester Knicks
- 2014–2015: Jämtland Basket
- 2016: Seoul SK Knights
- 2016: Nauticos de Mazatlán
- 2016: Tijuana Zonkeys
- 2017: Club Atlético Olimpia
- 2017: Garra Cañera de Navolato
- 2017–2018: Shahrdari Gorgan
- 2018: Al-Ahli Benghazi

Career highlights
- 2× CIBACOPA All-Star (2016, 2017); Ligat HaAl All-Star (2011); NBA D-League All-Star (2008); First-team All-Sun Belt (2006)

Dwayne Mitchell (born August 24, 1982) is an American professional basketball player. He played college basketball for Auburn University and the University of Louisiana at Lafayette.

== Professional career ==
Mitchell went undrafted in the 2006 NBA draft. In October 2006, he signed with Paris Basket Racing of France for the 2006–07 season.

In July 2007, Mitchell joined the Miami Heat for the 2007 NBA Summer League. On November 1, 2007, he was selected by the Iowa Energy with the 13th overall pick in the 2007 NBA D-League draft. On February 22, 2008, he terminated his contract with the Energy. Later that month, he signed with Brose Baskets Bamberg of Germany for the rest of the 2007–08 season.

In July 2008, Mitchell joined the Los Angeles Lakers for the 2008 NBA Summer League. On August 1, 2008, he signed with the Lakers. However, he was later waived by the Lakers on October 8, 2008. On November 1, 2008, he was reacquired by the Iowa Energy. Ten days later, he was traded to the Los Angeles D-Fenders in exchange for Patrick Sanders.

In July 2009, Mitchell joined the Portland Trail Blazers for the 2009 NBA Summer League. On August 29, 2009, he signed with Hapoel Holon of Israel for the 2009–10 season. On April 1, 2010, he was released by Holon after he sustained a knee injury which required surgery.

In October 2010, Mitchell signed with Maccabi Rishon LeZion for the 2010–11 season.

On July 31, 2011, Mitchell signed with Ironi Ashkelon for the 2011–12 season.

On August 21, 2012, Mitchell signed with MBC Mykolaiv of Ukraine for the 2012–13 season.

On July 27, 2013, Mitchell signed with Maccabi Rishon LeZion for the 2013–14 season, returning to the club for a second stint. However, after just two games, he was released by Maccabi on October 22, 2013. On December 14, 2013, he signed with Bucaneros de La Guaira of Venezuela for the 2014 LPB season.

On November 1, 2014, Mitchell was selected by the Westchester Knicks in the sixth round of the 2014 NBA Development League Draft. On November 21, 2014, he was waived by the Knicks after appearing in one game.
