= Maccabi Ironi Ramat Gan =

- Leagues: Israeli Basketball Premier League
- Founded: 1946; 80 years ago
- Arena: Zisman Arena
- Capacity: 1,400
- Location: Ramat Gan
- Team colors: White, Blue
- President: Hen Shniderman
- Head coach: Elad Hasin
- Ownership: Municipality of Ramat Gan
Home	Away

Maccabi Ironi Ramat Gan (Hebrew: מכבי עירוני רמת גן, formerly Ironi Ramat Gan) is a professional basketball club based in Ramat Gan in the Tel Aviv District. The team currently plays in the Israeli Basketball Premier League, the top division of Israeli basketball. It plays at the Shalom Zisman Municipal sports Arena, which has a seating capacity for 1,400.

== History ==
Maccabi Ramat Gan basketball club was formed in 1946. Since 1968, it has been permanent in the first league.

In 1972, it lost in the cup final to Maccabi Tel Aviv, 108–99, with Ramat Gan's star, Belgium-born Kamil Dirks, scoring a still-unbroken cup final record of 43 points.

In the seasons 1971–72 and 1972–73, it finished second in the league. The same happened in the 1982–83 season.

The club also took its first steps in the European Cup in the 1973–74 season. A notable game was its victory over Sinudyne Bologna. With one of the club's founders, Samuel Jacobson, as the coach and stars such as Larry Gordon and Bob Griffin, Ramat Gan gained a surprising victory in the result 114–94.

Its all-time leading scorer, Doron Jamchi, made his first steps in the club in 1978; he left to Maccabi Tel Aviv in 1985 after incredible years, with him being the league leading scorer for several seasons. Jamchi Is the all-time leading scorer in the history of the Israeli Premier League.

In 1987–88, led by head coach Effi Birnbaum, the club lost again to Maccabi Tel Aviv in the cup final at 107–85.

In December 1989 Ramat Gan won the Israeli Basketball League Cup title after winning Hapoel Tel Aviv 83:80 at the final game with Milton Wagner scoring 30 pts.

In the 1996–97 season, after increasing pressure from the city mayor, Maccabi Ramat Gan merged with another team, Beitar Ramat Gan, and is now called Maccabi Ironi Ramat Gan.

In 2001–02, it finished the season only second to Maccabi Tel Aviv, the champion.

In 2009–10, the team dropped to Liga Leumit after losing the relegation playoff in the Super League.

After a 13 years absence, Ramat Gan returned to the first league at the end of the 2022–2023 season, led by its former captain, now coach, Shmulik Brener .

Ramat Gan Return was a big success, it finished the 2023–24 season in the 3rd place and score its place in the BCL for the 2024–25 season.

== Players ==
=== Current roster ===
Note: Flags indicate national team eligibility at FIBA-sanctioned events. Players may hold other non-FIBA nationalities not displayed.

Maccabi Ironi Ramat Gan roster
Players
Coaches

Pos.	No.	Nat.	Name	Ht.	Age
G	0	(United States)	Allen, Justin	1.93 m (6 ft 4 in)	24 – 23 July 2002
PG	1	(Israel)	Beni, Gil (c)	1.80 m (5 ft 11 in)	27 – 27 October 1998
F/C	2	(United States)	Washington, Bryce	2.03 m (6 ft 8 in)	30 – 25 January 1996
G	3	(United States)	Adams, Jaylen	1.88 m (6 ft 2 in)	30 – 4 May 1996
G/F	5	(Israel) (Argentina)	Szuchman, Joaquin	1.91 m (6 ft 3 in)	31 – 29 January 1995
G	6	(Israel)	Paretsky, Roy	1.94 m (6 ft 4 in)	24 – 24 July 2002
PG	7	(United States)	Caver, Ahmad	1.88 m (6 ft 2 in)	30 – 12 September 1996
C	8	(Israel)	Atias, Yonatan	2.05 m (6 ft 9 in)	25 – 26 January 2001
G	9	(Israel)	Berkowitz, Ariel	1.85 m (6 ft 1 in)	17 – 29 October 2008
SF	10	(Israel)	Carreira, Lior	1.96 m (6 ft 5 in)	29 – 14 August 1997
PF	11	(United States)	Lewis, Justin	2.01 m (6 ft 7 in)	24 – 12 April 2002
G/F	14	(Israel)	Abouloff, Yonatan	1.95 m (6 ft 5 in)	21 – 9 September 2005
SF	30	(United States) (Dominican Republic)	Figueroa, L. J.	1.98 m (6 ft 6 in)	28 – 28 March 1998
G	35	(Israel)	Gabay, Eilay	1.91 m (6 ft 3 in)	18 – 6 August 2008

Head coach

- (Israel) Elad Hasin

Assistant coach(es)

- (Israel) Yoni Pont
- (Israel) Liad Schneider

Legend

- (C) Team captain
- Injured

- Roster
Updated: 1 October 2026

=== Depth chart ===
Pos.	Starting 5	Bench 1	Bench 2
C	Yonatan Atias	Bryce Washington
PF	Justin Lewis	Lior Carreira	Yonatan Abouloff
SF	L. J. Figueroa	Justin Allen	Roy Paretsky
SG	Joaquin Szuchman	Jaylen Adams	Eilay Gabal
PG	Ahmad Caver	Gil Beni	Ariel Berkowitz

- The Israeli league rule requires every team to have at least one Israeli on the court at any time.
- There should be maximum 5 foreigners on a 12-men game sheet.

== Notable players ==
Note: Flags indicate national team eligibility at FIBA-sanctioned events. Players may hold other non-FIBA nationalities not displayed.

Criteria

To appear in this section a player must have either:

- Set a club record or won an individual award while at the club
- Played at least one official international match for their national team at any time
- Played at least one official NBA match at any time.

- (Israel) Doron Jamchi
- (Israel) Haim Starkman
- (Israel) Shmulik Brener
- (Israel) Ben Altit
- (Israel) Dror Cohen
- (Israel) Nir Cohen
- (Israel) Itzik Ohanon
- (Israel) Mike Carter
- (Israel) Erez Markovich
- (North Macedonia) Ruan Stik
- (Nigeria) Tunji Awojobi
- (South Sudan) (United States) Nuni Omot
- (United States) (United Kingdom) Danny Lewis
- (United States) (Israel) Bob Griffin
- (United States) (Israel) Mark Brisker
- (United States) (Israel) Joe Dawson
- (United States) (Israel) Sean Labanowski
- (United States) (Israel) Isaac Rosefelt
- (United States) (Israel) Chris Watson
- (United States) (Israel) David Bernsley
- (United States) Harold Keeling
- (United States) Milt Wagner
- (United States) Rodney Alexander
- (United States) Erick Barkley
- (United States) Earl Williams
- (United States) J.J Eubanks
- (United States) James Gulley
- (United States) Andy Hill
