= Ef'al =

Ef'al (Hebrew: אפעל) may refer to:

- Ef'al Regional Council, a defunct regional council in Israel.
- Ef'al, a defunct kibbutz which became the Ramat Ef'al neighbourhood of Ramat Gan.
