= Omri Ronen =

Israeli lawyer, politician and social activist

- עמרי רונן
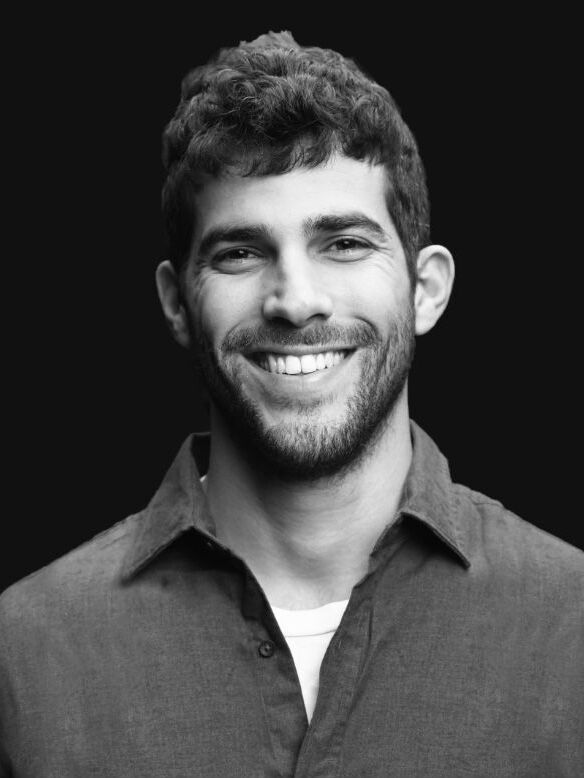
- Ronen in 2024

Faction represented in the Knesset
- 2026–: The Democrats

Personal details
- Born: 24 May 1992 (age 34) Kfar Aza, Israel
- Children: 2
- Known for: Social activism • Brothers and Sisters in Arms

Omri Ronen (Hebrew: עמרי רונן; born 24 May 1992) is an Israeli politician who serves as a member of the Knesset for The Democrats. He is also a lawyer and social activist, who is one of the leaders of the Brothers and Sisters in Arms protest. Ronen has participated in demonstrations, speeches, and media interviews, including on the American program "60 Minutes", where he emphasized the importance of the Supreme Court as the last line of defense of Israeli democracy.

== Biography ==
Ronen was born in Kfar Aza to Zlil and Idit Ronen. As a child, his family moved to Kokhav Ya'ir Tzur Yigal and he completed his high school education at Ami Assaf School. Ronen volunteered for a year of service through the Kibbutz Movement at the Neve Eyal boarding school, which cares for children with disabilities. In the army, he served in the Maglan unit. In 2014, he graduated with honors from the officers' course at the 1st Infantry Division. As part of his military service, he served as a team commander in Operation Shuvu Achim, Operation Protective Edge, and the Iron Swords War. He studied law at Tel Aviv University, which he graduated from in 2021. He interned at the State Attorney's Office in the economic department dealing with government corruption, security offenses, and white-collar offenses. In 2024, he was selected to the list of 40 most promising young people under the age of 40 by TheMarker.

== Social activism ==
Ronen is a graduate of the prestigious StandWithUs Israel Fellowship Program, the flagship program that trains leading students to promote Israel's image in the world. In 2022, he and friends founded the "Yahav-Educators for Zionism" association, which aims to inspire and deepen Zionist identity among young groups through education, ideological clarification, and social action.

In 2023, he began his activities as part of the protest against the judicial reform. He first did so by organizing internally with his military and reserve comrades, and then joined the Brothers and Sisters in Arms organization and became one of its leaders.

During the protest, Ronen announced that he would suspend his volunteering for the reserves if the thirty-seventh Israeli government completed the enactment of the judicial coup laws. In practice, he continued to report for the reserves.

In 2024, Ronen filed a defamation lawsuit against MK Galit Distel-Atbaryan, after she published inflammatory and false statements against him on social media, including claims that he had shed the blood of those murdered on 7 October and that he was an outsider. During that year, Ronen filed other lawsuits against people who made similar statements.

== The 7 October massacre and rebuilding ==
When the October 7 attacks broke out in 2023, Ronen alerted his team before they received a report order and went down to fight in the Gaza perimeter. He arrived with his team to Nir Oz. At the same time, Ronen waited for a sign of life from his grandmother Nira Ronen, who lived in Kfar Aza. Two days later, Ronen was informed that his grandmother had been murdered by Hamas terrorists along with her caregiver in her home. The terrorists left a letter declaring their intentions. He continued to serve in the reserves for an additional 230 days.

=== Reconstruction project in Kfar Aza ===
Ronen initiated the first Zionist-Pioneering construction project since the 7 October attacks, the renovation and reconstruction of 16 housing units in Kibbutz Kfar Aza. The project was carried out voluntarily by thousands of volunteers and donors who are citizens of the State of Israel and was handed over to the kibbutz in April 2025. The project is a joint initiative of the kibbutz together with "Rebuilding", which is a social implementation arm of Brothers and Sisters in Arms.

== Political activity ==
On 16 February 2026, Ronen announced his joining The Democrats led by Yair Golan. In the primary elections held on 20 July 2026, ahead of the 2026 Israeli legislative election, Ronen came in at number seven on the slate, and was elected as the Democrats won eight seats.

== Personal life ==
Ronen is married to Tamar, and is the father of two children. The family lives in the central district of Israel.
