= Tsafrir =

Tsafrir is a Hebrew surname which may refer to:

- Eliezer Tsafrir, Israeli author and former employee of Mossad
- Yoram Tsafrir, Israeli archeologist
