= Eyal Naveh =

Israeli social and political activist

- איל נוה
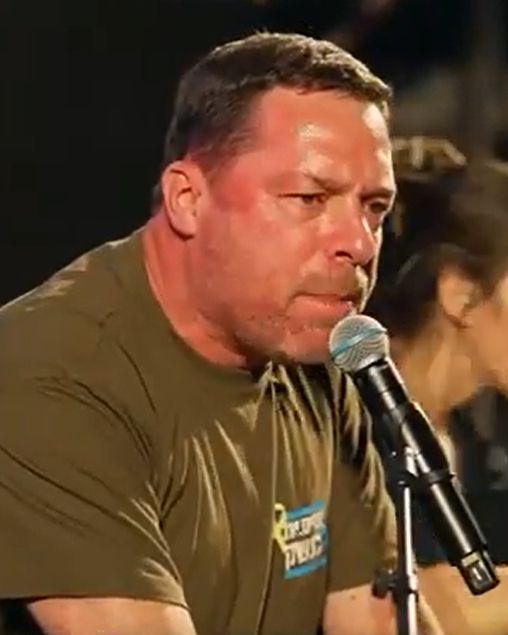
- Eyal Naveh, 2024
- Born: January 26, 1976 (age 50); Yavne, Israel
- Organization: Brothers and Sisters in Arms (Hebrew: אחים לנשק)
- Known for: Social activism

Eyal Naveh (Hebrew: איל נוה; born January 26, 1976) is an Israeli businessman and entrepreneur in the fields of real estate and high-tech, one of the founders of the Brothers and Sisters in Arms organization, and an Israeli social activist.

== Biography ==
Eyal Naveh was born in Haifa and raised in Yavne. He served in the army as a soldier and as a commander in the IDF's Special Operations Command. He then completed his bachelor's degree in law and business administration.

Early in his professional career, he served as a strategic consultant and project manager at the Gitam and Morel advertising agency. He later advanced to the position of VP and board member at leading companies in Israel, including HOT and Delek Israel. In 2016, he founded the "MIXER" coworking space network, which he manages. The company operates five coworking space complexes in Tel Aviv, Herzliya, and Ra'anana, which provide services to hundreds of high-tech companies, venture capital funds, and independent businesses.

Naveh volunteers at the Haredi "Haverim Le'Refuah" association, which provides medication to those who cannot afford it.

== Brothers and Sisters in Arms and the Civilian Task Force ==
In January 2023, following the announcement of the "judicial reform," which Naveh refers to as a legal coup, Naveh founded the protest organization "Brothers and Sisters in Arms," together with his Sayeret Matkal comrades, Ron Scherf and Eitan Herzel. In their view, the judicial reform was expected to cause serious damage to democracy in Israel. During the first months of its activity, the organization stood at the forefront of the public struggle against the judicial reform and focused on protest actions, information campaigns, organizing demonstrations, and other proactive actions.

=== Iron Swords War ===
Upon learning of the massacres on October 7, the organization's leaders announced an immediate cessation of protest activities and called on all reserve soldiers to report to defend the state. Within a few hours, Naveh and his friends established the "Civil Support Group," a separate, apolitical body, with the goal of providing immediate assistance and support to the IDF, the residents of the Gaza peremiter, the bereaved families, and the families of the kidnapped hostages. Within a few days, the initiative in the Civil Support Group became a large civilian force, with capabilities, resources, and extensive human capital, and acted as an immediate and effective response to needs in both the civilian and military fields. The Civil Support Group managed and promoted dozens of civilian initiatives under its leadership, including, among others: transportation, the purchase of military and civilian equipment, assistance to the security forces in locating missing persons through technological means, assistance to evacuees, assistance to bereaved families, distribution of medical equipment, and more. Later, an additional goal was added to it, building a model society in Israel the day after the war.

Led by Naveh and his friends, the first phase of the "Green Floors" neighborhood rehabilitation project in Kfar Aza, carried out by some 9,000 volunteer citizens from the "Rebuild" project of the Brothers and Sisters in Arms organization, was completed in April 2025. It is the first neighborhood ready for occupancy in the Gaza Envelope since the massacre, after undergoing extensive renovation. Additional renovations are planned to begin soon on the northern border, in the Moshavs Shtula and Netua, and also in Kiryat Shmona.

In November 2024, Defense Minister Yoav Galant was dismissed by Benjamin Netanyahu and replaced by Israel Katz. A few days later, Katz ordered the termination of the reserve service of Ron Scherf, and then also of his partner Eyal Naveh, due to their protest against the government, and a declaration – over a year earlier – that they would stop volunteering for service if "dictatorship laws" were passed. In response, Naveh criticized the defense minister, claiming that his actions were tearing the army apart.

That same year, after a mediation process, journalist Yinon Magal withdrew a defamation lawsuit he had filed against Naveh, over the extent of Magal's reserve service. Naveh responded, "The culture of lies is eroding democracy, this is a victory for truth and freedom of expression."

On June 6, 2024, Reichman University awarded Naveh an honorary doctorate, in recognition of his contributions to Israeli society in general, and in particular since the October 7 massacre.

=== Elections Task Force ===
In July 2025, Naveh, Ran Harnevo, and partners from various protest groups established the Elections Task Force, which aims to "return Israel to the path of a Jewish, liberal democracy, in the spirit of the Declaration of Independence!". The Elections Task Force is divided into three areas of activity: awareness raising, including monitoring and refuting fake news and conspiracy theories; election purity, including legal, technological, and logistical handling that will ensure the integrity of the elections and protect the Central Elections Committee; and motivation for action, including recruiting volunteers, organizing home groups, and operating an aid system on Election Day. Naveh is responsible for logistics and administrative support for all sections of the project. The Elections Task Force also includes Michal Beinish, Naveh's partner in the "Rebuilding" initiative, which has rebuilt entire neighborhoods in the Gaza parameter; Shiral Hogeg from the "Kumu" movement, founded by the October 7 families; Prof. Yaniv Rozenai, a member of the Law Lecturers for Democracy Forum; Prof. Karin Nahon, dean of the School of Communication at Reichman University; and Hadas Klein, a key witness in Netanyahu's cases who leads legal battles against online defamation. According to the founders, the Task Force is a non-political body designed to ensure, through civil means, that elections exist and that they are free, fair, and equitable.

== Personal life ==
Neve lives in Herzliya, is married and has six children.

== See also ==
- Brothers and Sisters in Arms
