= Eitan Herzel =

- איתן הרצל
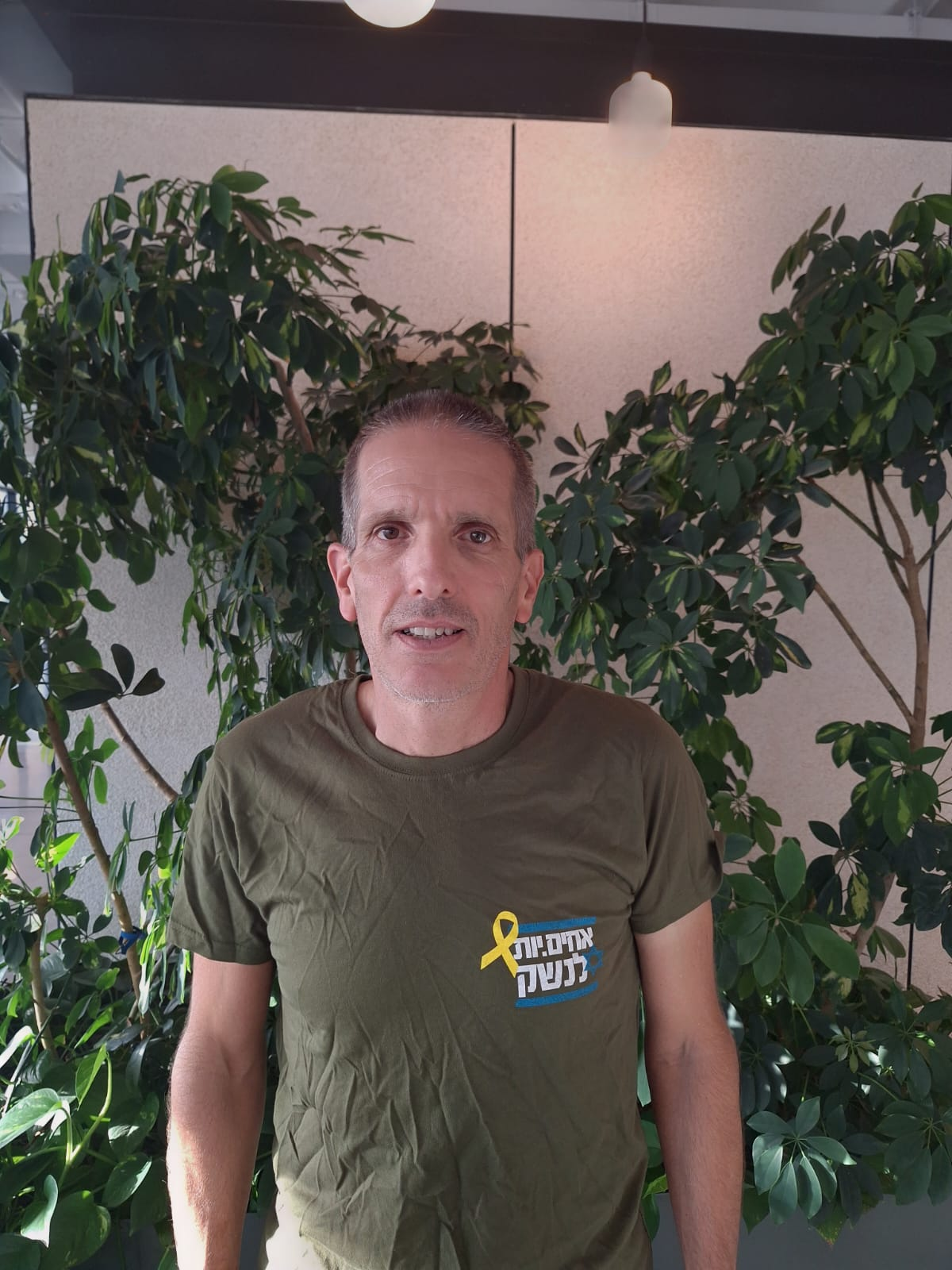
- Born: January 12, 1968; Sa'ad, Israel
- Education: Hadassah Academic College
- Known for: Leading 2023 Israeli judicial reform protests
- Title: Founder and CEO of Brothers in Arms

Eitan Herzel (Hebrew: איתן הרצל; born 12 January 1968) is the founder and CEO of Brothers in Arms, a political movement that was established as part of the protests against the judicial reform.

== Biography ==
Eitan was born and raised in Kibbutz Sa'ad to Chaim Herzel, a Holocaust survivor, Talmud teacher and Bnei Akiva member. His mother, Deborah Herzel, worked as an educator in the kibbutz.

Eitan studied at Kvutzat Yavne High School and enlisted in the Israel Defense Forces in 1986, serving as a fighter in Sayeret Matkal. After military service, he studied at Hadassah Academic College, earning a degree in physics with a specialization in electro-optics. He later held various management roles at KLA Corporation.

== Activism ==
In January 2023, Eitan heard about Yariv Levin's judicial reform. in response, he established a team of people (that included Ron Scherf and Eyal Naveh) to protest against the plan and seek its cancellation. The team, led by Eitan, initiated a three-day campaign calling on reservists to join the protest to amplify public opposition to the perceived "coup d'état", and to strengthen the Supreme Court of Israel as an essential and independent authority.

Eitan initiated and led protest activities in front of members of the Knesset, including Prime Minister Benjamin Netanyahu.

On 27 June 2023, he was arrested after demonstrating in front of the home of the Minister of Justice, Yariv Levin, but was released by a court that determined the arrest was arbitrary.

On 20 May 2024, Eitan was arrested after protesting against the new conscription law. The case was closed without charges being filed.

In June 2024, the Presidential Award for Volunteerism (formerly the “Presidential Award for Volunteers”) was awarded by the President of the State of Israel, Isaac Herzog, to the Civil Defense Force that the organization operated during the Gaza war.

== Civil assistance ==
Following the attack of Hamas on Israel in 2023, Eitan, together with Dror Erez and other activists from the organization, established the Beit Kama Command. This initiative rescued thousands of residents from border Kibbutzim and the towns of Netivot, Sderot, and Ofakim. Additionally, the command provided tens of thousands of hot meals and essential equipment to both soldiers and evacuees of the affected communities.

In the immediate aftermath of the war's outbreak, Herzel mobilized the movement's volunteer system to support farmers in agricultural communities near he border, led by Ronnie Piper.

In early November 2023, Herzel, joined by high-tech protest leaders Ziv Krupp and Dr. Lia Moran Gilad, went to Eilat at the invitation of Shlomo Mendelovitz, the Ministry of Health's mental health project director. There, they established and oversaw a psychological assistance system for the evacuees who had been sent to the city.

== Personal life ==
Eitan is married and has 3 children. He lives in the Jezreel Valley.
