= Lansing Community College =

Public college in Lansing, Michigan, US

- Motto: Where Success Begins
- Type: Public community college
- Established: 1957
- President: Steve Robinson
- Faculty: 1764 [citation needed]
- Administrative staff: 628 [citation needed]
- Students: 18,551 [citation needed]
- Location: Lansing, Michigan, United States; 42.7388°N 84.5525°W
- Campus: Urban, multiple campuses
- Colors: Blue and Gray
- Nickname: Stars
- Mascot: Lance the Astronaut [citation needed]
- Website: lcc.edu

Lansing Community College is a public community college with its main campus in Lansing, Michigan. Founded in 1957, the college's main campus is located on an urban, 42-acre (0.17 km^{2}) site in downtown Lansing spanning seven city blocks approximately two blocks from the state capitol. A West Campus opened in 2004 in Delta Township, southwest of Lansing. There is also an East Campus located in the Eyde Plaza in East Lansing.

At one time, the school was the third largest community college in Michigan by enrollment, with a fall 2013 enrollment of 18,551, a decrease from 20,394 in 2008.

== History ==
The college was founded in 1957 by Philip Gannon who served as president between 1957 and 1989.

== Academics ==
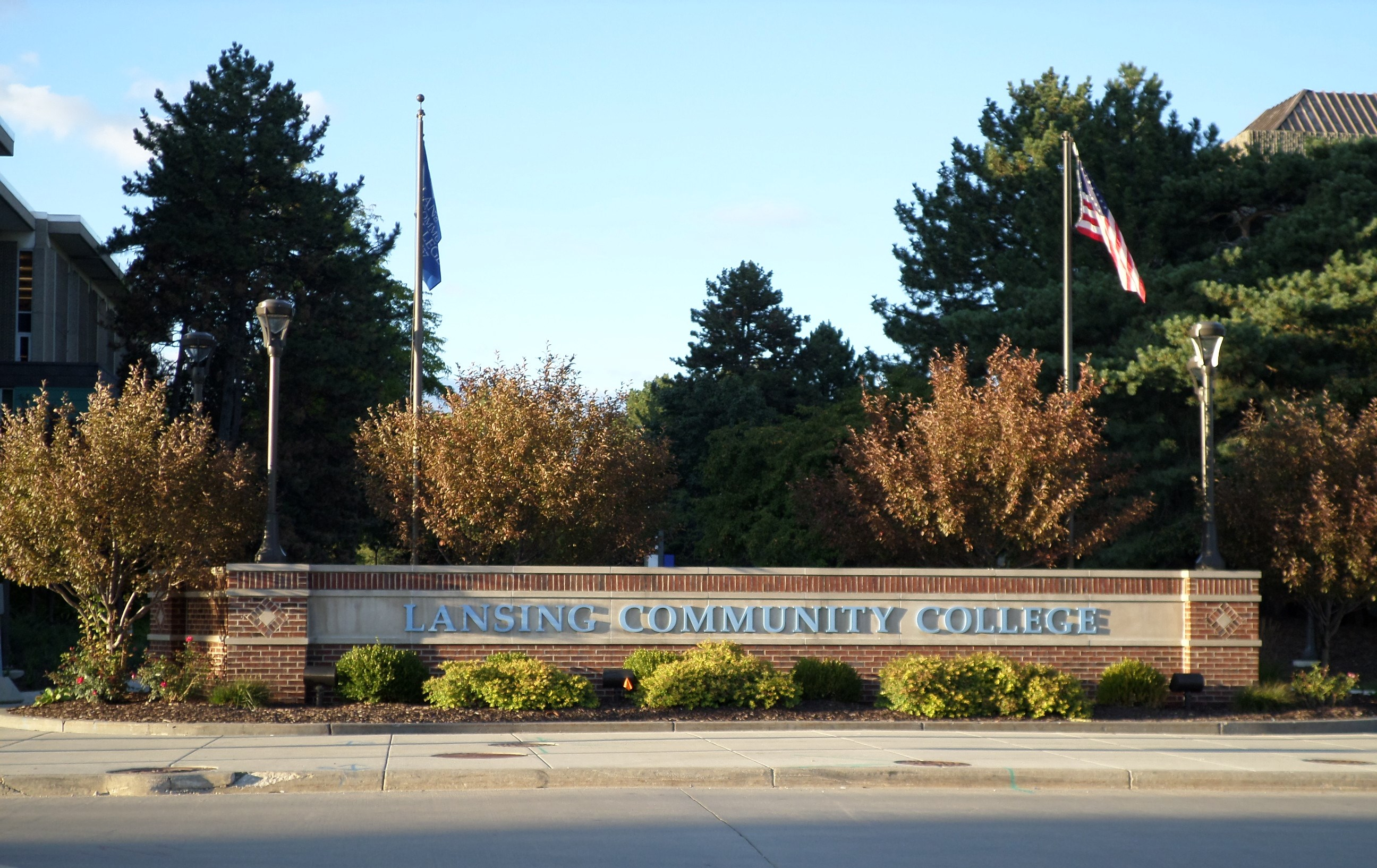
The front entrance along Shiawassee Street

Lansing Community College (LCC) offers 230 associate degree and certificate programs while offering approximately 1,150 courses each academic year. It is accredited by the Higher Learning Commission.

LCC is also a National Alternative Fuels Training Consortium Training Center. Most of the classes in this center are located at the college's West Campus.

== Athletics ==
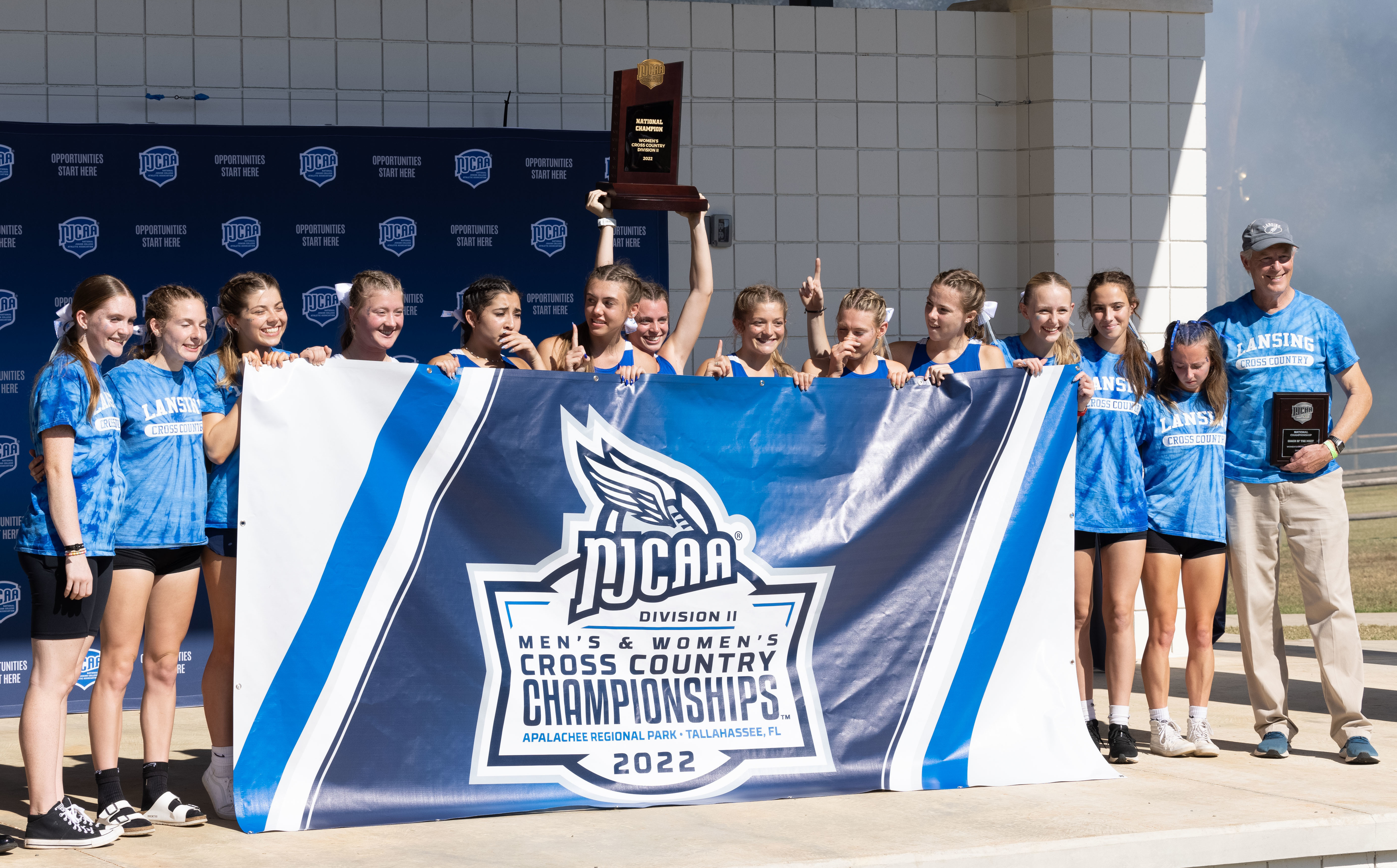
The Stars women's cross country team celebrating a national championship in 2022

The LCC Athletic Department fields nine intercollegiate teams. The Lansing Community College Stars play in the Michigan Community College Athletic Association, and is a member of the National Junior College Athletic Association.

Lansing Community College intercollegiate sports include:

- Fall - Men's and Women's Cross Country, Women's Volleyball
- Winter - Men's and Women's Basketball
- Spring - Men's and Women's Track and Field, Softball, Baseball

LCC also has a competitive club hockey team that participates in the American Collegiate Hockey Association and the Michigan Collegiate Hockey Conference.

== Notable alumni ==
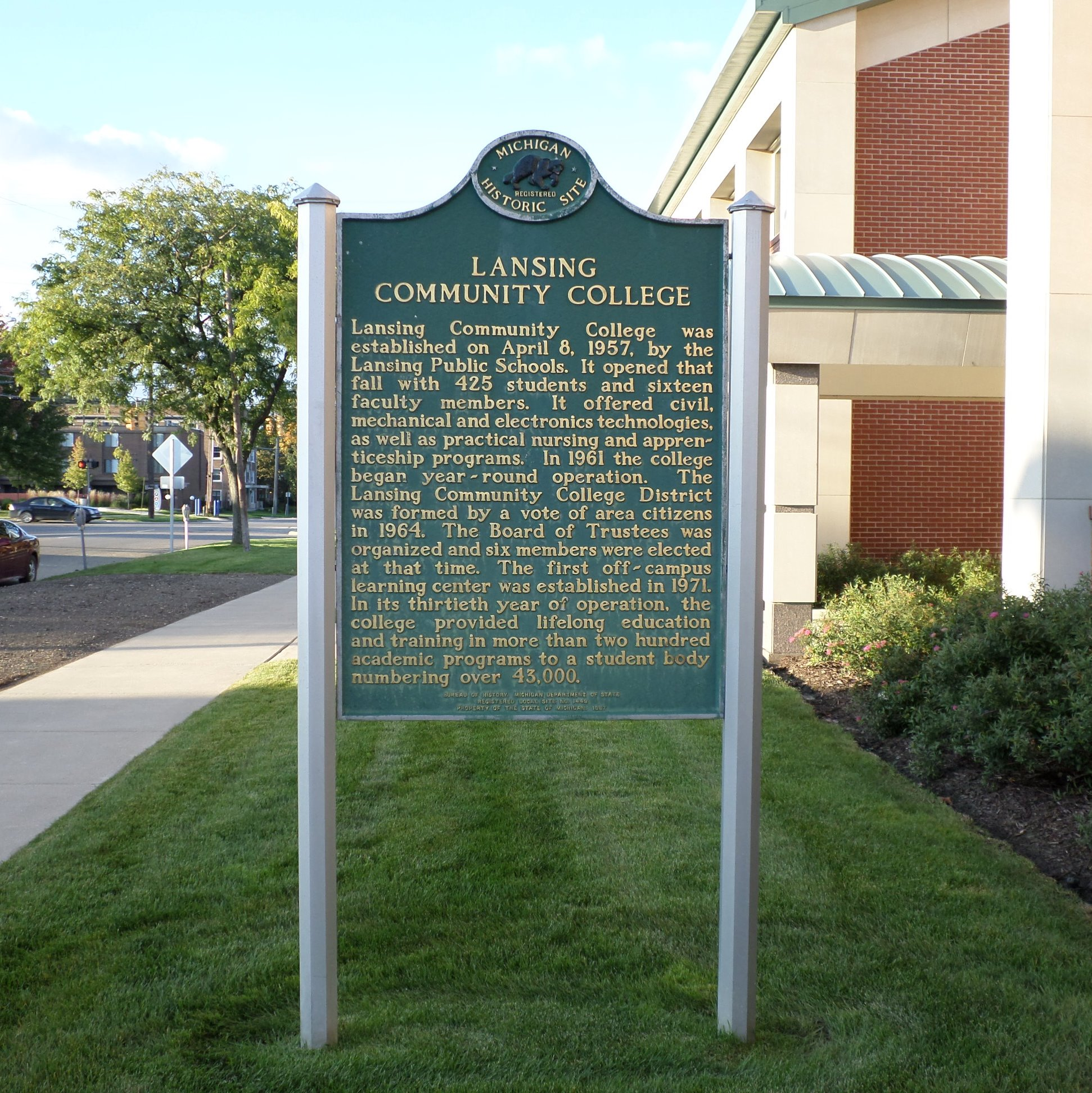
An historic marker for Lansing Community College

- Lingg Brewer, politician and educator
- Pamela Ditchoff, author
- Thom Hartmann, talk show host, author, businessman, and progressive political commentator
- Nate Huffman, professional basketball player, 2001 Israeli Basketball Premier League MVP
- Sabah Khoury, international basketball player
- Lisa McClain, politician
- Marcus Norris (born 1974), basketball player, 2003-04 Israeli Basketball Premier League Defensive Player of the Year
- Paul Michael Stoll (born 1985), American-Mexican basketball player
