= German Giltman =

Israeli military officer

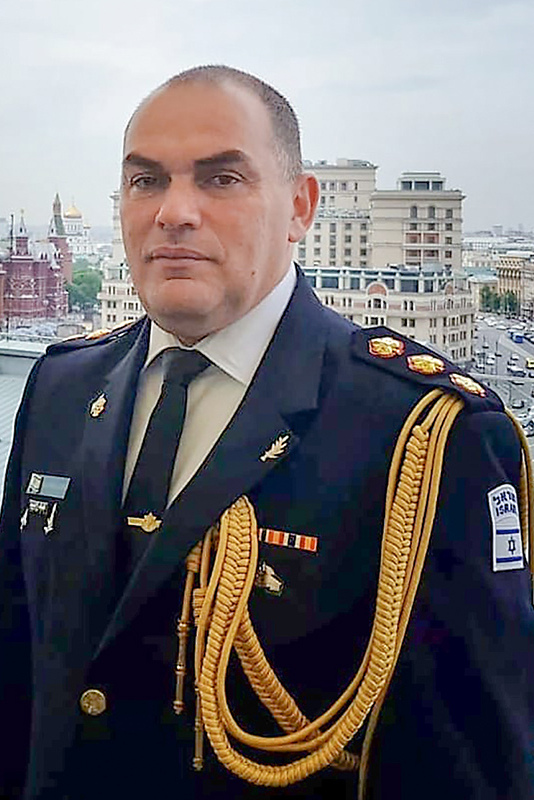
- Native name: גרמן גילטמן
- Born: Ukraine
- Allegiance: Israel
- Service: Israeli Ground Forces
- Conflicts: Gaza war

German Giltman (Hebrew: גרמן גילטמן) is an Israeli military officer.

== Early life ==
Giltman was born in Ukraine and emigrated to Israel at the age of 18. He attended Reichman University in Herzliya, Israel, graduating with a Bachelor of Arts in Business Administration & Information Technology in June 2004.

== Military career ==
In 2017, Gitlman was assigned as Israel's defense attaché to Russia.

=== Blocked promotion ===
In 2025, Giltman was recommended for promotion to brigadier general to lead the headquarters of the Israeli Ground Forces Command. Defense Minister Israel Katz blocked the promotion, citing Giltman's involvement with Brothers and Sisters in Arms, a protest group opposing the government's judicial overhaul, and claiming that he supported refusal to serve, which Giltman denies.
