= Guy Palatin =

Israeli basketball player

Guy Palatin גיא פלטין
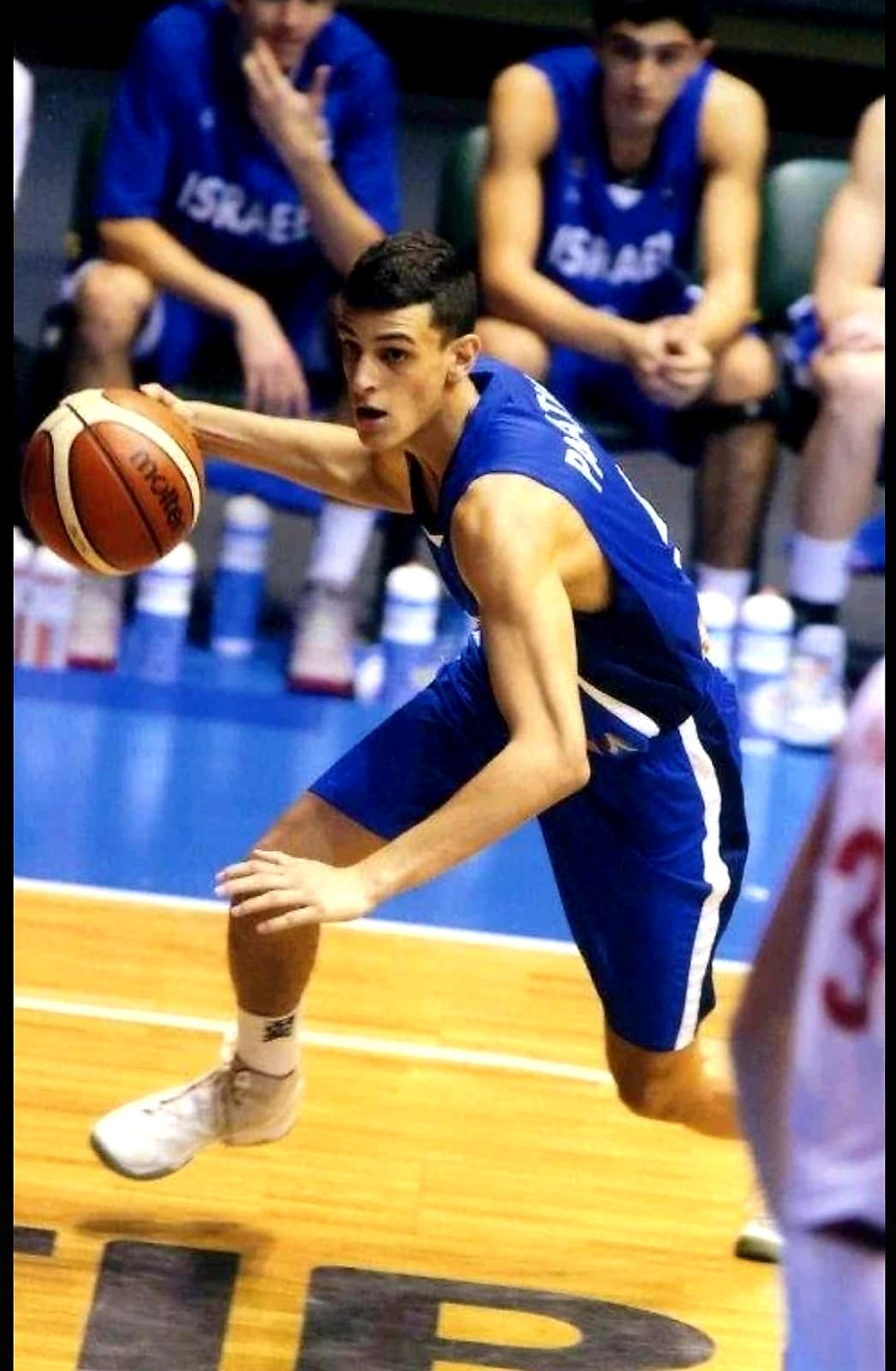

No. 9 – Hapoel Tel Aviv
- Position: Point guard / shooting guard
- League: Israeli Basketball Premier League; EuroLeague

Personal information
- Born: 25 September 2000 (age 26) Kfar Azar, Israel
- Listed height: 6 ft 4 in (1.93 m)
- Listed weight: 195 lb (88 kg)

Career information
- Playing career: 2018–present

Career history
- 2018–2020: Hapoel Holon
- 2020–2021: Hapoel Ramat Gan Givatayim
- 2021–2022: Maccabi Rishon LeZion
- 2023–2024: Ironi Kiryat Ata
- 2024–present: Hapoel Tel Aviv

Career highlights
- EuroCup champion (2025); Israeli Premier League Defensive Player of the Year (2024)

Guy Palatin (Hebrew: גיא פלטין; born 25 September 2000) is an Israeli professional basketball player for Hapoel Tel Aviv of the Israeli Basketball Premier League and the EuroLeague. He plays at the shooting guard position. He was named the 2024 Israeli Basketball Premier League Defensive Player of the Year.

== Early life ==
Guy Palatin was born in Kfar Azar, Israel. He was the first-born of Amir and Alonit Palantin, and grew up in Holon, Israel, where he played for the Holon youth team from the age of 8.

== Professional career ==
In the 2014/15 season, Palatin led the Hapoel Holon boys' team to a historic double, winning the championship and the cup. At the end of that season, Palatin was invited to the academy of the Israeli Basketball Association, at the Wingate Institute. Palatin played in the 2015/16 season as a point guard in the academy team with 11th and 12th grade students while he was still a 10th grade student.

From 2018 to 2020, starting when he was 18 years of age, Palatin played for Hapoel Holon. In those two seasons he played 13 games for the team.

In the 2019/20 season, Palatin was loaned to Hapoel Ramat Gan-Givataim from the Israeli National League, where he played as a point guard. In the 2020/21 season he chose to stay with Hapoel Ramat Gan-Givataim, and was signed again for a year as team captain. In May 2021, he was voted the 'breakthrough of the season' by the basketball association.

At the beginning of July 2021, prior to the 2021/2022 season, Palatin signed a two-year contract with Maccabi Rishon LeZion, which played in the Israeli Basketball Premier League. In 2021-22 for the team, in 20 games he averaged 15.9 minutes, 2.8 points, and 2.5 rebounds per game, while shooting 85.0% from the free throw line. His first season at Maccabi Rishon LeZion ended with the team's relegation to the National League, and the dismissal of coach Guy Goodes.

In June 2023, Palatin signed with Ironi Kiryat Ata. In the 2023/2024 season, Palatin averaged the highest steals in the Israeli Basketball Premier League (2.5 per game) In 2023-24 for the team, in 34 games he also averaged 23.3 minutes, 6.8 points, 3.0 rebounds, and 2.3 assists per game. He was a significant factor in the team's first playoff qualification in their history. At the end of the regular season, Palatin was voted the 2024 Israeli Basketball Premier League Defensive Player of the Year.

On 21 June 2024, he signed with Hapoel Tel Aviv of the Israeli Basketball Premier League. In 2024-25 for the team, in 49 games he averaged 12.5 minutes, 3.7 points, and 1.5 rebounds per game, while shooting 42.5% from three-point range. On 11 April 2025, Palatin won the EuroCup championship with Hapoel Tel Aviv for the first time in its history, which led the team to play in Europe's top competition in the 2025/26 Euro League season.

In 2025-26 for the team, in 47 games he averaged 13.1 minutes, 3.1 points, and 1.5 rebounds per game, while shooting 83.3% from the free throw line.

== National team and 3x3 career ==
In the summer of 2016, Palatin played on the cadet team (U16s) in the European Championship held in Bulgaria (Tier B). The team advanced to the final where they lost to the Russian team and won the silver medal.

Palatin also played for the Israeli national team during the 2016 FIBA U16 European Championship, 2017 FIBA U18 European Championship, and 2018 FIBA U18 European Championship.

3x3 tournament

In the summer of 2017, Palatin played for the Israeli team in the World Championship in China, in the 3x3 tournament. The Israeli team reached 9th place.

In the summer of 2021, Palatin played with the Israeli 3x3 team in the 3x3 European Championship qualifying tournament held in Tel Aviv. Palatin participated in two age categories (adults and U23s),and qualified with both in 1st place for the European Nations Championship. In the 2021 Nations League (U23) tournament, Palatin played for the Israeli national team which won the final.
