= First Line Med =

Health charity organization

- בצרה קראת ואחלצך
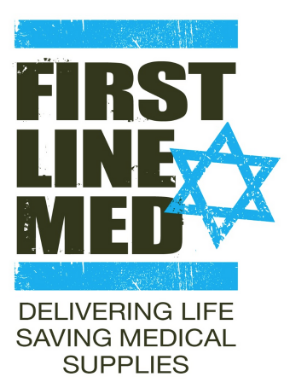
- Formation: October 2023; 2 years ago
- Founders: Professor Sharon Perlman
- Location: Israel
- Services: Providing medicine; providing medical supplies; mental health care
- Website: first-line-med.com

First Line Med is an Israeli organization with the purpose of providing medicine and medical supplies to military doctors on the front lines. It was founded in 2023 by Professor Sharon Perlman following the October 7th attack by Hamas on Israel and the subsequent outbreak of war in 2023.

== History ==
First Line Med, founded in October 2023 by Professor Sharon Perlman, a senior medical doctor in the ultrasound department at Beilinson Hospital and former doctor in the Israeli Air Force, following the October 7th attack by Hamas on Israel and the subsequent Gaza war. The initial basis for the establishment of First Line Med began out of BeTzara Karat VeAchaltzecha (Hebrew: בצרה קראת ואחלצך; In Trouble You Called and I Rescued You), an organization led by Sarai Fang Segev for the medical and mental health treatment of protesters against the judicial reform, which itself sprouted out of organizations like Brothers in Arms (Hebrew: אחים לנשק) and The White Robes (Hebrew: החלוקים הלבנים).

Initially, Perlman began to amass medical supplies at her home while rounding up friends and co-workers for the task. Her operation quickly grew and took on an international scope when the first plane of medical supplies, specifically for her operation, landed in Israel. According to Perlman, donations and medical supplies arrive from The United States, Canada, Europe, and Australia.

Within a few weeks, many volunteers joined the organization, many with previous military medical experience, who used their contacts abroad to help raise funds via donations and purchasing medical supplies and equipment which were then provided to army units, clinics on the home front as well as security teams.

In March 2025, the organization was forced to suspend services to secondary victims due to insufficient funding and plead for public support.
