= Brian Randle =

American basketball player and coach (born 1985)

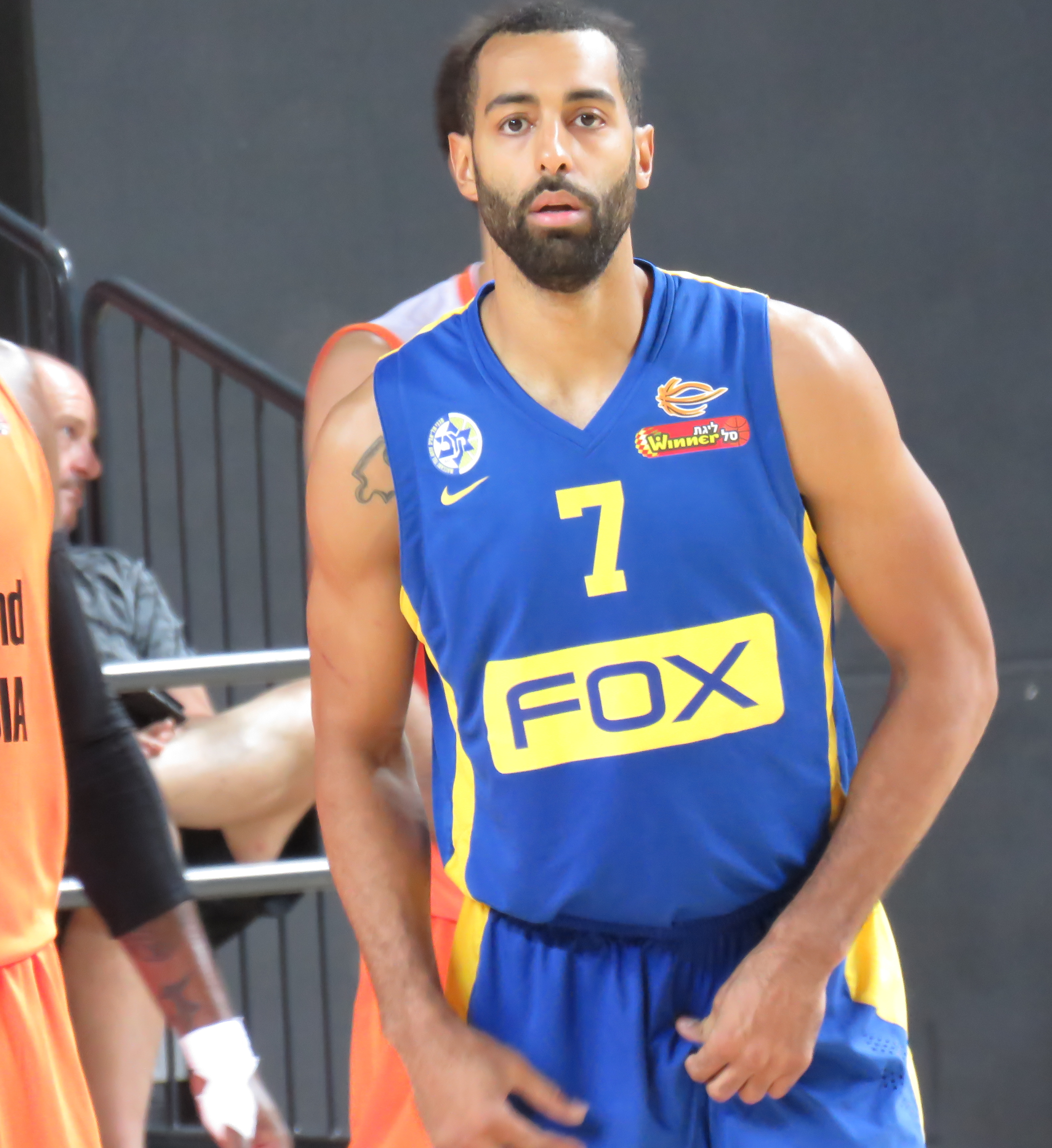

Phoenix Suns
- Position: Assistant coach
- League: NBA

Personal information
- Born: February 8, 1985 (age 41) Peoria, Illinois, U.S.
- Listed height: 6 ft 8 in (2.03 m)
- Listed weight: 220 lb (100 kg)

Career information
- High school: Peoria Notre Dame (Peoria, Illinois)
- College: Illinois (2003–2008)
- NBA draft: 2008: undrafted
- Playing career: 2008–2017
- Number: 7, 11, 15, 42, 95
- Coaching career: 2019–present

Career history

Playing
- 2008–2010: Hapoel Gilboa Galil Elyon
- 2010–2012: Hapoel Jerusalem
- 2012–2013: Alba Berlin
- 2013: Hapoel Tel Aviv
- 2013–2014: Maccabi Haifa
- 2014–2016: Maccabi Tel Aviv
- 2017: Hapoel Jerusalem
- 2017: Enel Brindisi

Career highlights
- Israeli League champion (2010); 2× Israeli Cup winner (2015, 2016); Israeli League Finals MVP (2010); All-Israeli League Team (2010); 3× Israeli League Defensive Player of the Year (2009, 2014, 2015)

Brian Charles Randle (born February 8, 1985) is an American assistant coach for the Phoenix Suns of the National Basketball Association (NBA). He played college basketball at the University of Illinois. He is a former professional basketball player. He was a three-time Israeli Basketball Premier League Defensive Player of the Year, and was the 2010 Israeli Basketball Premier League Finals MVP.

== Early life ==
Randle graduated from Peoria Notre Dame High School in 2003 and had an outstanding senior season averaging 22.9 points, 12.8 rebounds, 5.2 blocks, and 3.1 assists. He finished fourth in voting for Illinois Mr. Basketball in his senior season, and was recruited by Bill Self. He was selected to the State Farm Holiday Classic all-tournament team in three consecutive seasons, from 2000 to 2002.

== College career ==
In the 2003–04 season, Randle played in 32 games – including starting 9 games. Randle averaged 2.7 points and 3.3 rebounds per game. On December 30, 2003, Randle had his best statistical game, grabbing 11 rebounds and 9 points against UIC.

He took a medical redshirt during the 2004-05 NCAA tournament run season after punching a wall in frustration during practice and breaking his hand.

In the 2005-06 college basketball season, Randle was one of three team captains for the Fighting Illini, along with Dee Brown and James Augustine. Randle had his best game playing Wisconsin on the road on January 31, 2006, with a double-double. Against the Badgers, Randle scored 12 points and pulled down 13 rebounds helping the Illini to a 66–51 victory. Randle was named to the All-Big Ten Defensive Team, and ranked ninth in the Big Ten in field goal percentage.

In the 2006-07 college basketball season, Randle once again was looked to as a leader for the Fighting Illini, along with Warren Carter, Jamar Smith, Rich McBride, and Shaun Pruitt. He had an early season groin injury that caused him to miss most of the non-conference schedule.

Randle graduated with a bachelor's degree in agri-finance and a master's in sports management.

== Professional career ==
Randle has signed with Hapoel Gilboa Galil Elyon of Israel prior to 2008–09 season. In his second season with the club he led them to the Israeli Championship, beating Maccabi Tel Aviv in the finals of the Israeli Final Four. He was the 2010 Israeli Basketball Premier League Finals MVP.

In the summer of 2010 Randle left Galil Elyon and signed with Hapoel Jerusalem on a two-year contract.

On October 10, 2012, he signed on a two-month trial contract (with an extension until the end of the season) with the German team Alba Berlin. In February 2013, he returned to Israel and signed with Hapoel Tel Aviv.

On August 15, 2013, Randle signed with Maccabi Haifa of Israel for the 2013–14 season.

On July 25, 2014, he signed a two-year deal with Maccabi Tel Aviv. He was a three-time Israeli Basketball Premier League Defensive Player of the Year (2009, 2014, and 2015),

On July 25, 2015, he left Maccabi and signed with Lokomotiv Kuban Krasnodar, but he was released from the team after failing physical tests. On September 1, 2015, he re-signed with Maccabi Tel Aviv for the 2015–16 season.

On January 21, 2017, Randle returned to his former club Hapoel Jerusalem. In March 2017, he got injured and missed the remainder of the season.

On August 21, 2017, Randle signed with the Italian team Enel Brindisi for the 2017–18 season. In November 2017, he retired from professional basketball.

== Coaching career ==
On September 21, 2018, Randle was announced to be a part of the Minnesota Timberwolves' coaching staff as an assistant video coordinator, effectively confirming his retirement as a player. Randle was later promoted to a player development coaching role with the Timberwolves on June 27, 2019.

On September 8, 2020, Randle was named a part of the Phoenix Suns' coaching staff as a proper assistant coach. In his first season with the Suns, he not only helped the team reach the NBA playoffs for the first time since 2010, but also the NBA Finals for the first time since 1993.

On July 10, 2024, Randle became an assistant coach for the Washington Wizards.

After a season with the Wizards, Randle would return to the Phoenix Suns once again, this time being an assistant coach under new head coach Jordan Ott, their fourth head coach in four seasons.

== Career statistics ==
Legend
| GP | Games played | GS | Games started | MPG | Minutes per game |
| FG% | Field-goal percentage | 3P% | 3-point field-goal percentage | FT% | Free-throw percentage |
| RPG | Rebounds per game | APG | Assists per game | SPG | Steals per game |
| BPG | Blocks per game | PPG | Points per game | PIR | Performance index rating |
| **Bold** | Career high |

=== EuroLeague ===
| Year | Team | GP | GS | MPG | FG% | 3P% | FT% | RPG | APG | SPG | BPG | PPG | PIR |
|---|---|---|---|---|---|---|---|---|---|---|---|---|---|
| 2012–13 | Alba Berlin | 2 | 0 | 13.9 | .250 | .000 | .500 | 4.0 | .0 | .0 | .5 | 3.0 | 2.0 |
| 2014–15 | Maccabi Tel Aviv | **25** | **25** | **28.7** | **.595** | .240 | .655 | **5.6** | **2.0** | **1.5** | **1.2** | **12.0** | **15.4** |
| 2015–16 | Maccabi Tel Aviv | 8 | 8 | 22.4 | .577 | **.400** | **.700** | 2.5 | 1.0 | 0.6 | 0.8 | 8.5 | 7.1 |
| Career | | 35 | 33 | 26.5 | .582 | .267 | .659 | 4.8 | 1.7 | 1.2 | 1.1 | 10.7 | 12.7 |
