= Pamela Ditchoff =

American novelist

- Born: Pamela Jane Reed; September 21, 1950 (age 75); East Lansing, Michigan, U.S.
- Education: Lansing Community College (AA, 1979); Michigan State University (BA, 1982; MA, 1985)
- Occupation: Writer

Pamela Jane Ditchoff (born September 21, 1950) is an American novelist.

== Life and work ==
Pamela Jane Reed was born on September 21, 1950, in East Lansing, Michigan, to Beatrice Watson (Porter) and Ronald Ernest Reed. She attended Fairview School and later East Lansing High School before graduating from Lansing Community College (associate degree, 1979). In a 2016 interview with the student newspaper at Lansing Community College, she described her work on the school newspaper and the resources made available to her while she attended the community college. After Lansing Community College, she moved to Michigan State University where she earned a B.A. in 1982 and an M.A. in 1985.

In the mid-1980s, her early fiction and poetry was published in various literary magazines.

Ditchoff's first novel, The Mirror of Monsters and Prodigies (Coffee House Press, 1995) is a semi-fictional oral history of dwarves, giants, conjoined twins and bearded women. The book was reviewed on NPR's All Things Considered and The New York Times. Giving the novel one out of four stars, Rebecca E. Roberts wrote for Detroit Free Press that Mirror "ultimately amounts to snippets of history, thinly coated with imagined dialogue and fiddled events". It was considered "well researched and well written" when reviewed by ALA Booklist as a debut novel.

Ditchoff's second novel Seven Days & Seven Sins (2003) was published by Shaye Areheart and reviewed by The Washington Post. Set in Lansing, the novel is composed of chapters that each function as standalone short stories.

Ditchoff's third novel, Mrs. Beast (Stay Thirsty Press, 2009), is about the lives of the Grimm's Fairy Tales princesses after marriage. Ditchoff's sequel to Mrs. Beast entitled Princess Beast was published by Stay Thirsty Press in September 2010. Ditchoff's fifth novel, Phoebe's Way (ECW Press, 2014), is the story of a Saint John Ambulance therapy dog.

Ditchoff recorded an oral history interview for Michigan State's Michigan Writers Series.

== Works ==
=== Novels ===
- The Mirror of Monsters and Prodigies, 1995
- Seven Days & Seven Sins, 2003
- Mrs. Beast, 2009
- Princess Beast, 2010
- Phoebe's Way, 2014
- Beatrice Penny Survived 2021

=== Non-fiction ===
- Poetry: One, Two, Three, 1989
- Lexigram Learns America’s Capitals, 1992

== Awards ==
- Michigan Addy Award for Excellence as producer/director of Artpeace, 1984
- John Ciardi Scholar, Bread Loaf Writers' Conference, 1991
- Winner, Chicago Review Award in Fiction awarded to Ditchoff for her work Prodigies, 1991
- Walter Dakin Fellow, Sewanee Writers' Conference, 1998
