= Kfar Azar =

Kfar Azar כְּפַר אֲזָ״ר
- Neighborhood of Ramat Gan
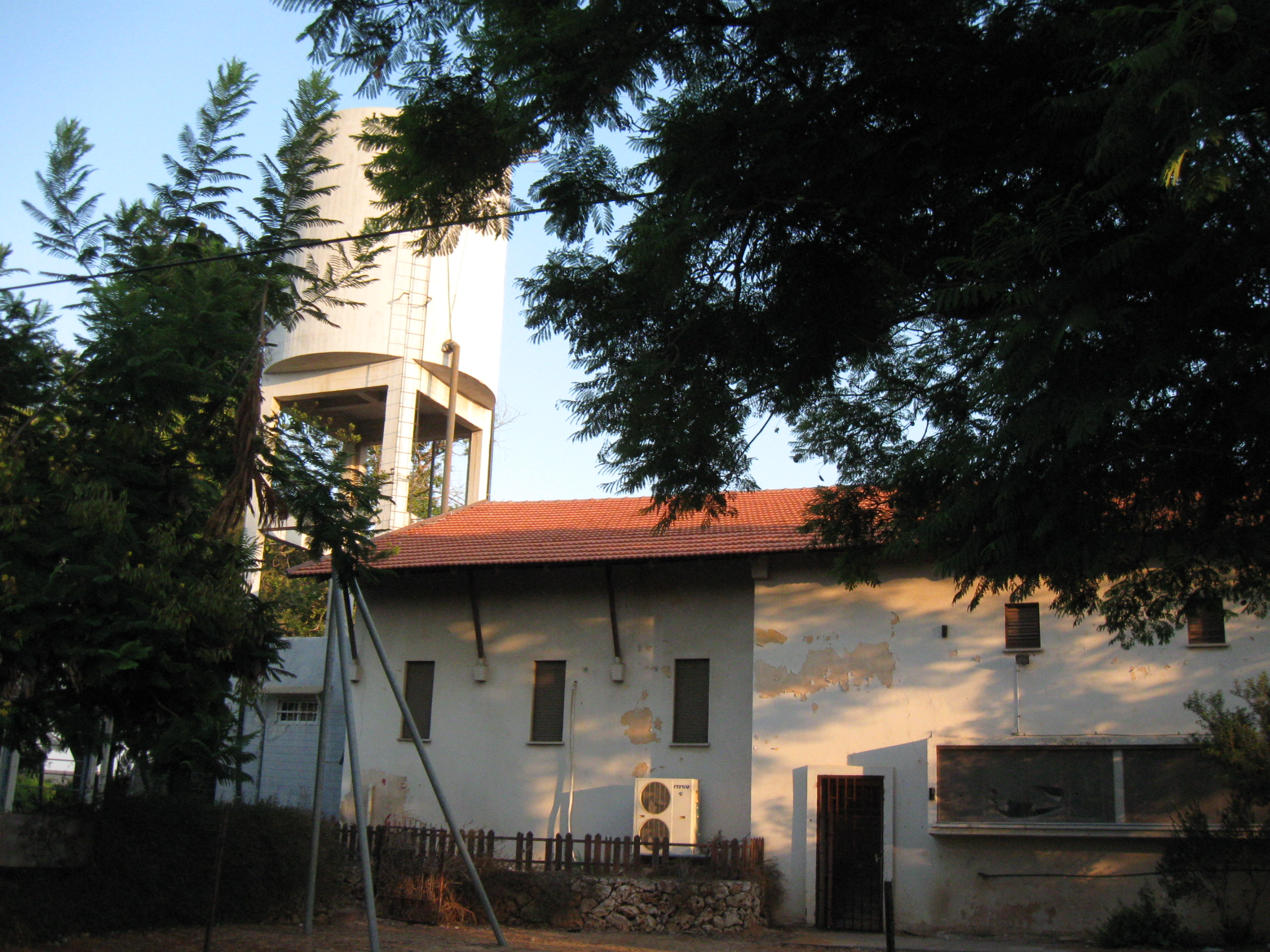

- Location within Central Israel
- Coordinates: 32°3′54″N 34°50′12″E
- Country: Israel
- City: Ramat Gan

Kfar Azar (Hebrew: כְּפַר אֲזָ״ר) is a moshav ovdim located in the Ono Valley in central Israel. Previously part of Ef'al Regional Council, in 2007 it was transferred to the municipality of Ramat Gan together with Ramat Ef'al. With an area of around 1,000 acres (4.0 km^{2}), its population is around 500.

The moshav was established in December 1932 by two pioneer groups, Brenner and Ma'ash. Land was purchased adjacent to the Arab village al-Khayriyya, and was later supplemented by more land bought by the Jewish National Fund. The name "Azar" was given to the moshav as an acronym for Alexander Ziskind Rabinovitz, a Jewish Russian writer, who celebrated his eightieth birthday in the year the moshav was established.

The population at the end of 1951 was 375.

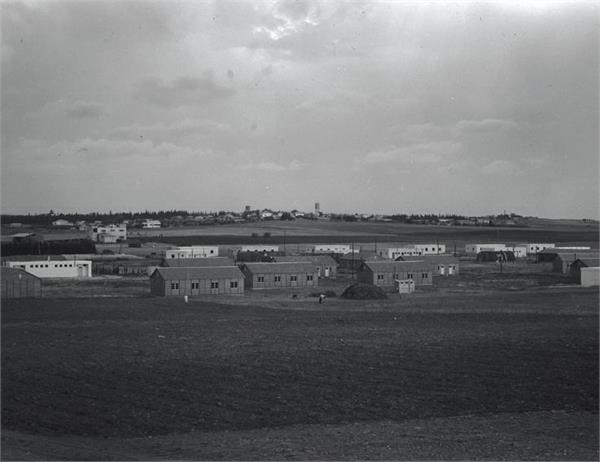
Kfar Azar 1947

== Notable people ==
- Guy Palatin ( born 2000), basketball player for Hapoel Tel Aviv in the Israeli Basketball Premier League
- Yoram Tsafrir, archaeologist
