= Marcus Norris =

American basketball player (born 1974)

Personal information
- Born: August 20, 1974 (age 52) Jackson, Michigan, U.S.
- Listed height: 6 ft 1 in (1.85 m)

Career information
- High school: Jackson High School
- College: Lansing Community College; Ball State University
- Position: Guard

Career highlights
- Israeli League Defensive Player of the Year (2004)

Marcus Anthony Norris (born August 20, 1974) is an American former basketball player, who played for 17 years in Europe, in the guard position. He was the 2003–2004 Israeli Basketball Premier League Defensive Player of the Year.

== Early life and education ==
Norris was born in Jackson, Michigan, in 1974, playing basketball at Jackson High School. He attended Lansing Community College and Ball State University.

== Career ==
Norris played basketball in Tampere, Finland, for Pyrbasket from 1996 to 1998. From 1998 to 2000, he played in Croatia for Svjetlost Brod. From 2000 to 2003, Norris went to Portugal to play for Portugal Telecom.

From 2003 to 2004, he played in Israel for Beni Hasharon, a team in the suburb of Tel Aviv. He was the 2003–2004 Israeli Basketball Premier League Defensive Player of the Year.

From 2004 to 2005, Norris played in Kyiv, Ukraine, for BC Kyiv, a team owned by Olexandr Volkov. From 2005 to 2010, Norris went to CB Gran Canaria, Las Palmas Spain in the ACB. In 2010–2011, Norris went to Turkey for four months to play for Erdimir in the TBL Turkish League.

In the 2011–2012 season, Norris went to Lleida, Spain, and in February signed in Portugal with Benfica, before retiring in 2012.
