= Erez Katz =

Israeli basketball player

Erez Katz ארז כץ
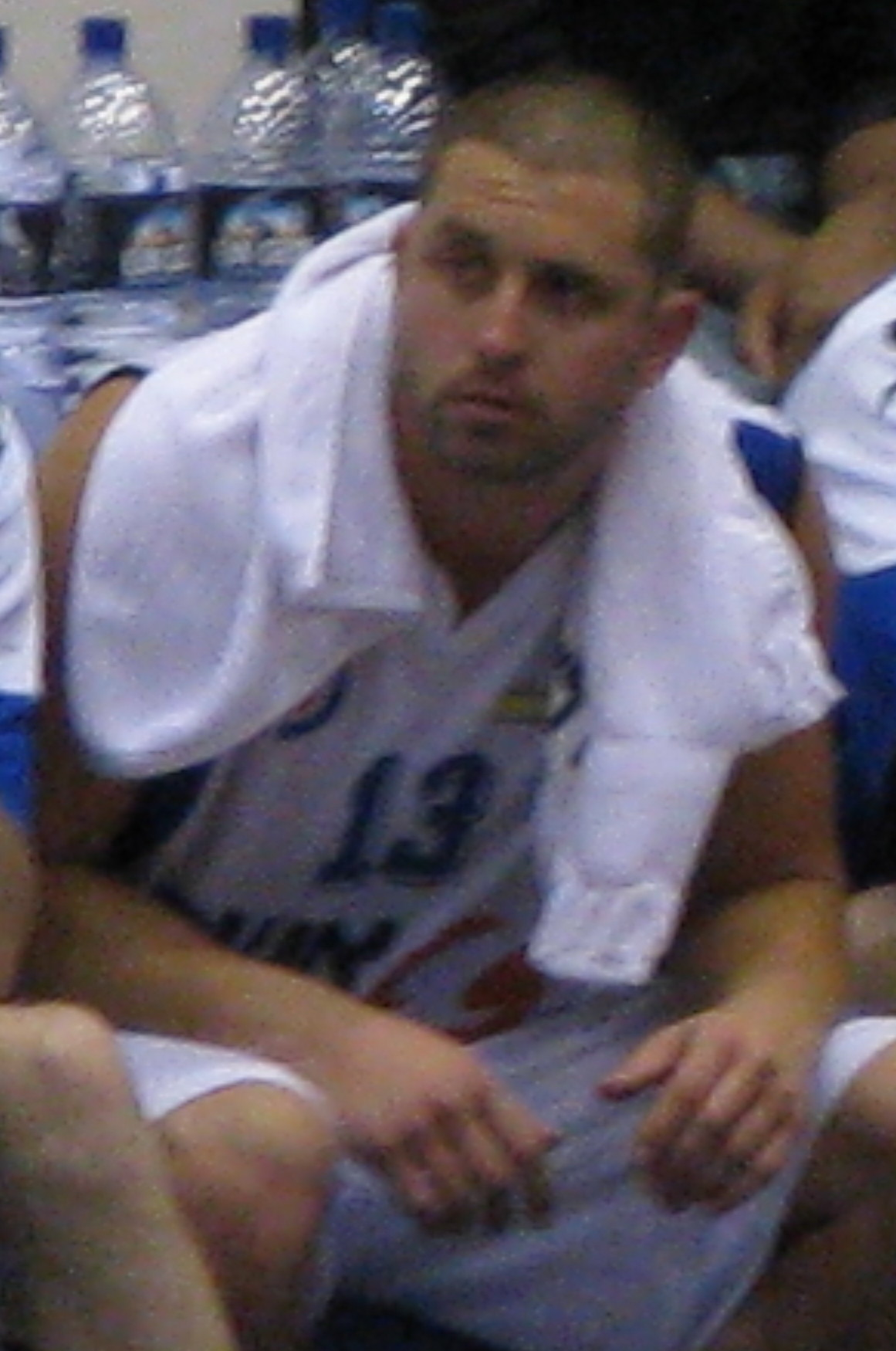

Personal information
- Born: April 9, 1980 (age 46)
- Listed height: 6 ft 4 in (1.93 m)

Career information
- Playing career: 1998–2012
- Position: Point guard

Career highlights
- Israeli Basketball Premier League Defensive Player of the Year (2004-05)

Erez Katz (Hebrew: ארז כץ; born April 9, 1980) is an Israeli former basketball player. He played the point guard position. He played for Hapoel Jerusalem, Ironi Ashkelon, Hapoel Tel Aviv, Bnei Herzliya, and the Israel men's national basketball team. He was the 2004-05 Israeli Basketball Premier League Defensive Player of the Year.

== Biography ==
Katz. He grew up playing for the Hapoel Jerusalem junior basketball team.

Katz played for Hapoel Jerusalem from 1998 to 2004 in the Euroleague and the Eurocup, for Ironi Ashkelon in 2004–05, for Hapoel Tel Aviv in 2005–06, and for Bnei Herzliya from 2006 to 2012 in the Eurocup and the Israeli BSL. In 2004–05, he was the Israeli Basketball Premier League Defensive Player of the Year.

He was a member of the Israeli U-18, U-20, and U-21 National Basketball Teams. In 1998, Katz played in the FIBA U18 Euro Championship A. With them, he won the silver medal at the 2000 European U-20 Championship, and played in the 2001 World U-21 Championship. He was also a member of and captain of the Israel men's national basketball team, and played at the 2003 European Championship.
