= Brothers and Sisters in Arms =

Israeli protest movement, advocacy group, and aid organization

- אחים ואחיות לנשק
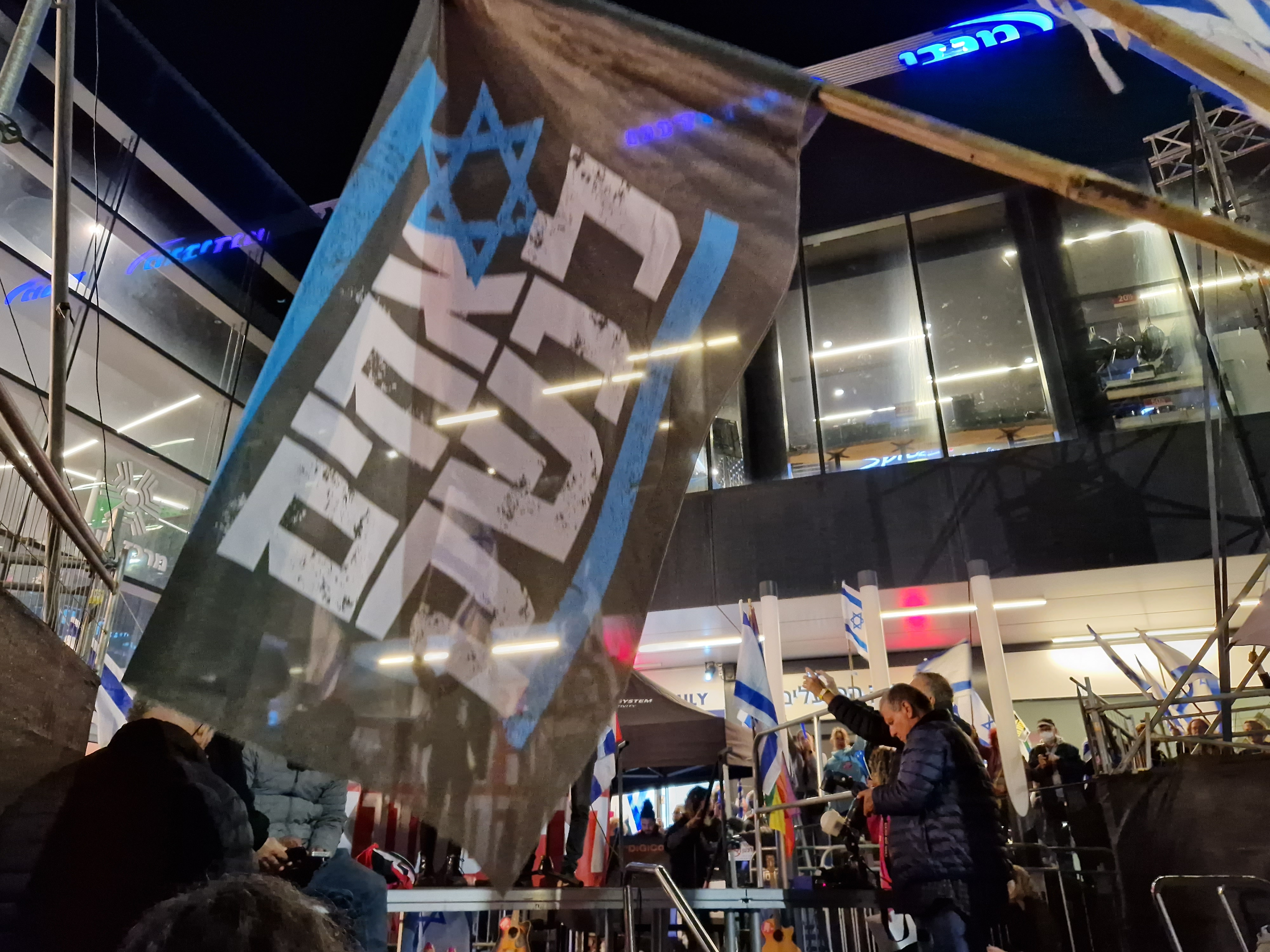
- Activists of the "Brothers and Sisters in Arms" organization during a demonstration as part of a protest against the judicial reform, March 23, 2023
- Formation: 2023
- Founders: Ron Scherf; Eyal Naveh; Eitan Herzel
- Purpose: Opposition to the Thirty-seventh government of Israel; aid to victims of Hamas and Hezbollah attacks
- Location: Israel
- Services: Advocacy; Protest activities
- Website: https://www.bnsia.org

Brothers and Sisters in Arms (Hebrew: אחים ואחיות לנשק), also known as Achim Laneshek and Brothers in Arms (Hebrew: אחים לנשק), is an organization of reserve men and women from various units of the IDF, operating within the protest movement against the judicial reforms promoted by the thirty-seventh government of Israel headed by Prime Minister Benjamin Netanyahu.

On October 7, 2023, the day Hamas invaded southern Israel, the organization suspended all political and protest activities and began devoting itself full-time to aid and relief under the name Brothers and Sisters for Israel.

In mid-2024, the organization resumed its protest activities across the country, calling for new elections and the Haredi conscription, currently exempt from military service in the IDF.

In June 2024, the Brothers and Sisters in Arms received The Presidential Award for Volunteerism (formerly the “Presidential Award for Volunteers”) from the President of the State of Israel, Isaac Herzog.

== Formation ==
The organization was founded in January 2023 by reserve Lieutenant-Colonel Ron Scherf, reserve Sergeant-Major Eyal Naveh, and reserve Sergeant-Major Eitan Herzel, former members of the Sayeret Matkal IDF unit, following a speech by Justice Minister Yariv Levin in which he announced the judicial reforms planned by the government. Members of Brothers and Sisters in Arms, together with many other Israelis, recognized that these measures would cause severe harm to democracy in Israel.

From the beginning, the goals of the organization were to prevent these measures and strengthen Israeli democracy. The organization operated in various ways, including demonstrations in front of the homes of ministers and members of the Knesset, "vigils" that included discussion positions, advocacy in Israel and abroad, and disruption and protest actions such as hanging giant anti-judicial reform signs on cliffs, blocking roads and blocking entry to the offices or websites of organizations regarded as being responsible for the government program (such as the Kohelet Policy Forum) or symbolize areas of life that are expected to be severely affected as a result (such as the Ministry of Defense and the Tel Aviv Stock Exchange). Another central activity was the signing of statements by reservists that they would cease volunteering for service until the planned legislative measures are stopped. The organization's operations are funded through donations from the public as well as the sale of branded equipment of the organization (shirts and hats).

The organization operates on several levels: A steering committee of seven people, each of whom is responsible for one area (strategy, operations, foreign relations, communications, intelligence, etc.). Beneath them, the staff that carries out the tasks, the administrative headquarters, several departments, and about 300 people. In addition, there are tens of thousands of members in the organization's WhatsApp groups who receive updates from the organization. Some of the activities are secret, while others are open to the general public. All the activity is voluntary. The organization's methods of operation are military-based and include, for example, compartmentalization and incident investigation. Most of the members of the executive committee come from the General Staff Reconnaissance Unit, more commonly known as Sayeret Matkal, but the organization includes veterans of various military units.

The organization began in a WhatsApp group that Eitan Herzel started with some members of Sayeret Matkal and gained momentum in a three-day march, which began on February 8, 2023, from Latrun to the Supreme Court in Jerusalem, which the initiators defined as a journey to preserve democracy in Israel. The march was joined by veterans of combat units and senior officials in the defense community. As the days went by, the number of participants grew from about 1,000 people on the first day to about 2,500 on the second and about 10,000 on the third. Like other activities of the organization, non-reservist citizens who support the goals of the organization and its actions, joined the march.

On March 28, 2024, the leaders of the organization declared that they were suspending the protest following Prime Minister Benjamin Netanyahu's announcement that the government had decided to delay further action on the legislation in order to try and reach a negotiated agreement but that they would be "one minute away" from calling for a resumption of the protests if the negotiations failed. During this period, the activists continued to participate in dialogue activities and hold regular demonstrations. Shortly after the suspension, the organization returned to full protest activity after members of the government explicitly declared that they are continuing to promote the judicial reform.

== Activities ==
=== Protest and disruption actions ===
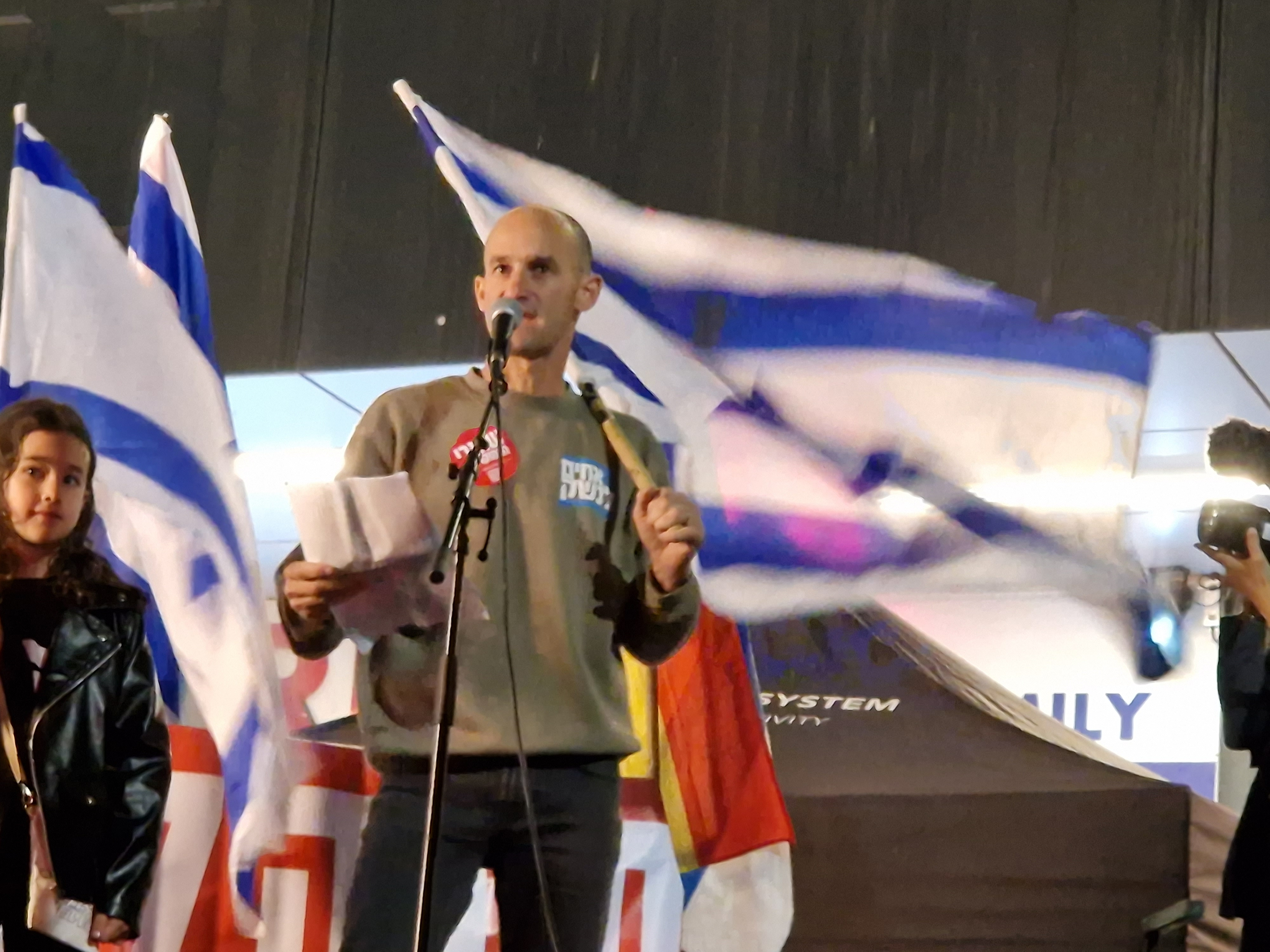
Lt. Col. Ron Scherf, co-founder of the "Brothers in Arms" Movement, speaks at a demonstration in Haifa at Horev Square against the judicial reform, March 25, 2023

The organization's activists operate demonstration centers, some of them permanent, in front of the homes of ministers and key Knesset members including Minister of Defense Yoav Gallant, Minister of Agriculture Avi Dichter, Minister of Justice Yariv Levin, Minister of Economy and Industry Nir Barkat, Member of Knesset and Knesset National Security Committee Chairman Zvika Fogel, and Minister of Immigration and Absorption (formerly Ministry of Aliyah and Integration) Ofir Sofer. They also take part in major demonstrations throughout the country, Including reinforcing protest points where demonstrators have experienced violence from the supporters of the judicial reform. Furthermore, various protest and disruption actions have been conducted, some of which are detailed below:

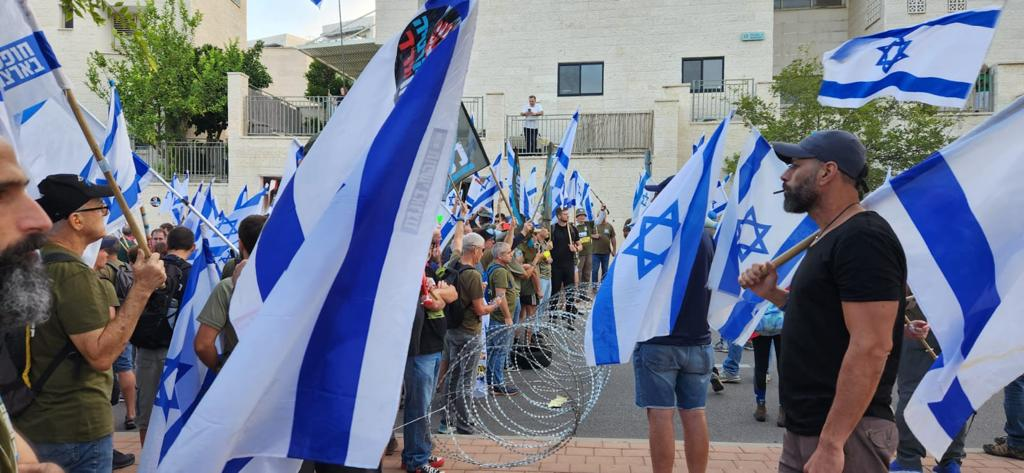
Demonstration of "Brothers in Arms" in front of the home of Justice Minister Yariv Levin in Modi'in, June 27, 2023

- Blocking Highway 1 in the Sha'ar HaGai area and establishing a symbolic border crossing between democracy and dictatorship, as part of the protest organizations' "Day of Disruption" on March 1, 2023.
- Blocking the entrance to the offices of Kohelet Policy Forum, an association that has a dominant influence on the advancement of the government's legislative measures, using barbed wire and sandbags, as part of a "day of disruption" on March 9, 2023. The leaders of the organization said that they are "sealing the rift that divisiveness creates in the nation. Everyone has already understood that divisiveness harms the state's economy and the security of the state". Six activists were arrested during the activity, including Ron Scherf, one of the founders of the organization. On the same day, dozens of the organization's activists, including former navy commanders Ami Ayalon and David Ben-Besht, blocked the port of Haifa with flares and boats, for about two hours, under the title "There is no freedom of movement in a dictatorship".
- The establishment of a symbolic recruitment office in front of the Bnei Brak municipality in a call for equality in burden (of military service), as part of a "day of disruption" on March 16, 2023. On the same day, the organization's activists hung a 200-meter sign at the Eliakim junction "The dictatorship is tearing the people apart".
- The arrival of a group of activists from the sea, in kayaks and swimming, at Prime Minister Benjamin Netanyahu's house in Caesarea on March 17, with the aim of conveying to him the message that he must intervene and "stop the coup". On June 11, hundreds of activists protested in front of the daycare center in Caesarea with a display that included a 15-meter-high tree, a ladder, and a huge dismissal letter, under the title "Bibi Get Down from the Tree!" calling for the dismissal of the Minister of Justice Yariv Levin.
- Hanging a 600-meter sign on the sides of Highway 1, showing Gallant, Dichter, and Barkat as the famous sculpture in the form of the three monkeys, on March 19. On March 23, the organization's signage campaign went up throughout the country "Your finger will lead to a civil war" targeting the ten Knesset members from the Likud who did not express a firm position against the legislative measures.

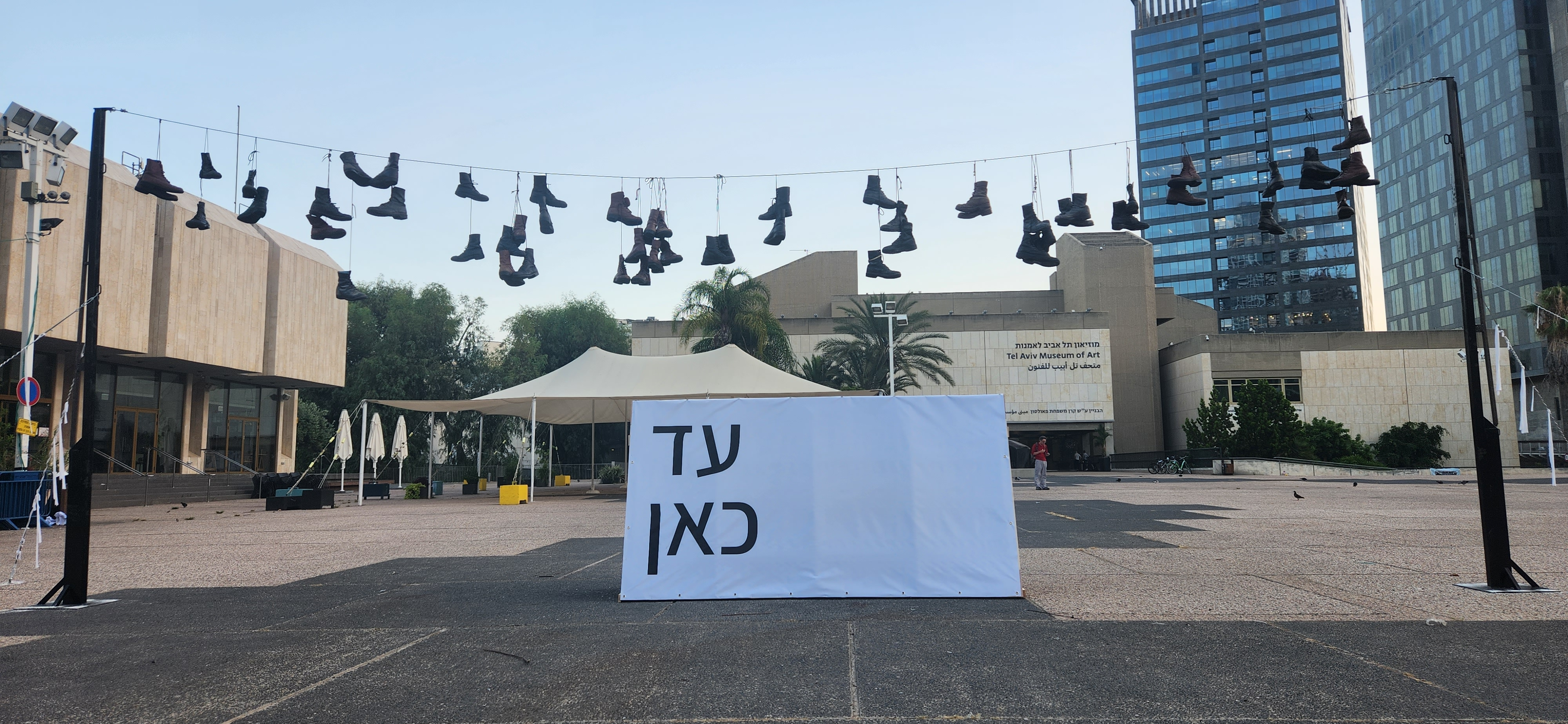
The Tel Aviv Museum plaza in preparation for an event announcing the suspension of volunteering for the reserves organized by the organization

- Demonstration by hundreds of activists outside the Israel Museum at the conference held on March 22. The speeches of government ministers Yitzhak Goldknopf and Miri Regev were interrupted and Netanyahu canceled his arrival at the conference.
- Demonstration of hundreds of protesters outside the Religious Zionist Party's cup-raising event in Petah Tikva, held in the presence of the Chairman of the Constitution, Law and Justice Committee Simcha Rothman, on March 24 as part of "National Paralysis Day". Levin's car was hit by protesters. Several protesters were arrested.
- A demonstration at the entrance of the Kiryat Arba settlement, where the Minister of National Security Itamar Ben-Gvir lives, and a call for him to resign from his position, under the slogan "It's simply too much for you", on March 26. According to them, "it is not given to someone who was not drafted into the IDF because of his extreme positions and violent past to wreak havoc in the State of Israel and endanger the security of the state". On April 14, two huge signs were hung on the roads of the country, referring to the minister and criticizing him for his conduct in the face of the wave of terrorism. Another demonstration was held on May 4 in front of Ben-Gvir's house in Kiryat Arba. A display was set up dealing with the murders in Arab community and the murder of women and a sign was hung that read "3 months, 78 murdered - one guilty!" On the day of the budget approval in the Knesset, May 23, activists hung signs against the minister on the way to the Knesset: "Ben-Gvir zero abilities in the budget", "Ben-Gvir zero abilities in front of Smotrich", "Ben-Gvir zero concern for the police".
- A demonstration during the speech of the Chairman of the Constitution Committee Simcha Rothman, as part of the conference of the Jewish Federations of North America, which was held at the exhibition grounds in Tel-Aviv on April 24.
- On the 75th Independence Day of the State of Israel on April 26, the activists of the organization hung a sign with the inscription "Democracy" on a cliff in Masada and the Israeli flag and the Declaration of Independence in Nahal Qumran. The activists said that "Masada will not fall a second time and Israeli democracy will never fall. Long live the State of Israel". In addition, activists from the navy held a flotilla along the coast of Tel Aviv in about 150 yachts and a small plane carried the sign "Free in our country". The inscription "Israel democratic since 1948" was written on the pumping station building at Sha'ar HaGai. Also, Israeli flags were hung near the houses of the Knesset members of United Torah Judaism in Bnei Brak.
- A demonstration of support with the participation of hundreds of the organization's activists outside the home of former Supreme Court judge Aharon Barak, in front of about 50 demonstrators supporting the legislative measures, on April 30.
- As part of the National Equality Day, on May 4, demonstrations were held against the non-conscription of yeshiva members near the home of Rabbi Gershon Edelstein and a symbolic "recruitment office" was opened in front of the Ponevezh Yeshiva, calling for the ultra-Orthodox to sign a new contract with the state and take part in the burden of service. For example, a morning prayer was held in collaboration with the "Religious, Zionist, Democrat" protest organization in front of the home of Minister Bezalel Smotrich in Kedumim with the chant "True religious Zionism carries the burden, does not perpetuate the state". In addition, there was a support demonstration of hundreds of people in front of the house of retired Chief Justice Aharon Barak, in front of a counter-demonstration of hundreds of supporters of the legislation.
- A demonstration of dozens of activists in front of the house of Minister Yitzhak Goldknopf in Jerusalem on May 16. The demonstrators set up a display of Louis Vuitton bags and threw bills on the floor, protesting the transfer of coalition funds to the ultra-Orthodox and the property tax fund. On May 17, a demonstration was held in Bnei Brak, near the home of the Chairman of the Finance Committee, MK Moshe Gafni, under the title "The Siege of Bnei Brak - A Rage March Against a Miserer of Public Money", against the property tax bill and the expected distribution of the budget to the ultra-Orthodox public.
- On Jerusalem Day, which fell on May 18, the organization's activists hung signs on the walls of the Old City that read "Democratic and Liberal Jerusalem".
- A demonstration of hundreds of activists outside Netanyahu's house on May 25 on the claim that he weakens and isolates Israel from the world in general and the United States in particular, and the Iranian enemy that recognizes its weakness rushes to an atomic bomb without hindrance.
- With the return of ministers and Knesset members from New York on June 6, "Brothers in Arms" activists placed a huge sign visible from the air with the inscription - "We the People - SOS Democracy" - in order to remind the ministers" in what state is the country they are returning to". On the same day, activists staged a protest using a vessel, at the ribbon-cutting ceremony at the Achziv Sea Reserve, with the participation of the Minister of the Environment Idit Silman.
- Activists of the organization disrupted Knesset member Nissim Vaturi's speech at the cultural Friday event at the Mash'an sheltered housing in Ramat Ef'al on June 23 and accused him of "sending soldiers to the gallows"
- Blocking access to the street in the city of Modi'in where Justice Minister Yariv Levin lives, with wire fences, and the display of sausages "This is how the salami works", on June 27.
- As part of a day of protest held on July 3, activists blocked the entrance to Port of Haifa. They brought with them a container full of Polish salami sausages and said that these "represent the dictatorial model that Prime Minister Yariv Levin is trying to import from Poland".
- On July 6, the "Night of the Conspirators" took place, as part of which thousands of activists went out to demonstrate in front of the houses of the coalition members.
- On July 9, hundreds of activists held a "white night" in front of the Defense Minister's house, during which former senior officials in the defense establishment gave speeches and called on Gallant not to let the legislation continue.
- A huge sign "There is no people's army in a dictatorship" was hung in Kfar Daniel in order to remind the decision-makers of what is at stake if the legislation continues.
- On a protest day on July 18, dozens of activists chained themselves to the Kariya Gate on Kaplan Street, Tel Aviv, in order to create awareness of the danger in which the State of Israel is in. Also, hundreds of protesters blocked all entrances to the stock exchange in Ramat Gan. The demonstrators hung huge signs with the inscription "Saving the economy" and another sign on the scoreboard with the data on the damage to pensions since the judicial reform legislation began.

=== Advocacy, negotiation and rapprochement actions ===
Throughout the period of the protest, the founders of the organization and its key activists have been speaking at demonstrations throughout the country, including from the main stage of the protest on Kaplan Street in Tel Aviv. They are often interviewed by the media in Israel and attract the interest of the foreign media as well. The organization's activists have set up speakers' corners outside the homes of ministers and members of Knesset and have held talks with rabbis from Religious Zionism movement aimed at generating dialogue and bringing home the message that the Israeli army as "the army of the people" is falling apart due to the government's legislative measures. A tent has also been set up near the recruitment office at the Tel Hashomer army base to conduct dialogues with the ultra-Orthodox youth who come there to receive their exemptions from military service. The tent has been operating in shifts since March 20, 2024. The members of the organization have also produced a series of informational videos ("The Lighthouse") featuring some of the leaders of Israeli society. Other activities of the organization include:

- A joint prayer for the unity of the nation near the Rose Garden in Jerusalem, on March 22, in collaboration with other organizations.
- Distribution of hundreds of bouquets of flowers during Passover at various police stations throughout the country in gratitude for the hard work of the police.
- A campaign launched on April 22, 2024 to pin notices on hundreds of bulletin boards calling on the ultra-Orthodox to share the burden of military or civilian service under the slogan "without conscription, there is no reconciliation". On April 30, a digital and outdoor sign campaign repeated the call to the Israeli government to fairly distribute the burden of service. In Safed, signs were hung to mark the seventy-fifth anniversary of the breaking of the siege of Safed by the 3rd Battalion of the Palmach on May 5.
- A march in Jerusalem on May 16 in conjunction with the "March of Flags" in Jerusalem with the aim of "appropriating the moderate right-wing community and the uncommitted elements of religious Zionism."
- Meetings with lawyers on May 22 to explain the organization's position ahead of the elections to the Bar Association.
- Participation in the pride parade in Jerusalem.
- Participation of dozens of activists in the salute ceremony for the liberators of the Western Wall that took place on June 5 outside the Western Wall Plaza in Jerusalem (after the Western Wall Heritage Foundation refused permission to hold it in the square).

=== Cessation of volunteering for the reserves ===
On March 21, the leaders of the organization announced the beginning of a petition to be signed by reserve soldiers who pledged to stop volunteering for reserve military duty if the planned legislative measures for judicial reform were passed. In the days that followed, the number of signatories began to grow.

The organization's activists continued to warn that there would be irreversible harm to the army if the legislation was not stopped.[95] On July 19, members of the organization gathered at the Tel Aviv Museum Square and declared a halt to volunteering for the reserves to preserve the IDF's moral values. In the following days, the organization's activists demanded that Chief of Staff, Lieut.-General Herzi Halevi, "Knock on the table and tell the government in a loud and clear voice: 'You are dissolving the people's army! Your legislation is dangerous for the security of the country!'

On July 22, at the end of a mass protest march to Jerusalem, organization activists distributed copies of the petition calling on reserve soldiers to stop volunteering for military duty. The petition was worded as a personal letter in which signatories wrote: "I am not ready to serve a government that does not respect the values of Israel as a democratic state and acts contrary to the principles and spirit of the IDF. This statement is written with great pain, out of my moral and conscientious duty. I will continue to fight in legitimate civil ways to keep Israel democratic, free, and equal. A people's army only exists in a democracy". That evening, the organization held a press conference with representatives of dozens of units and announced that 10,000 people would stop volunteering for the reserves if the legislation moved forward.

=== Activity during 2023 Israel–Gaza war ===
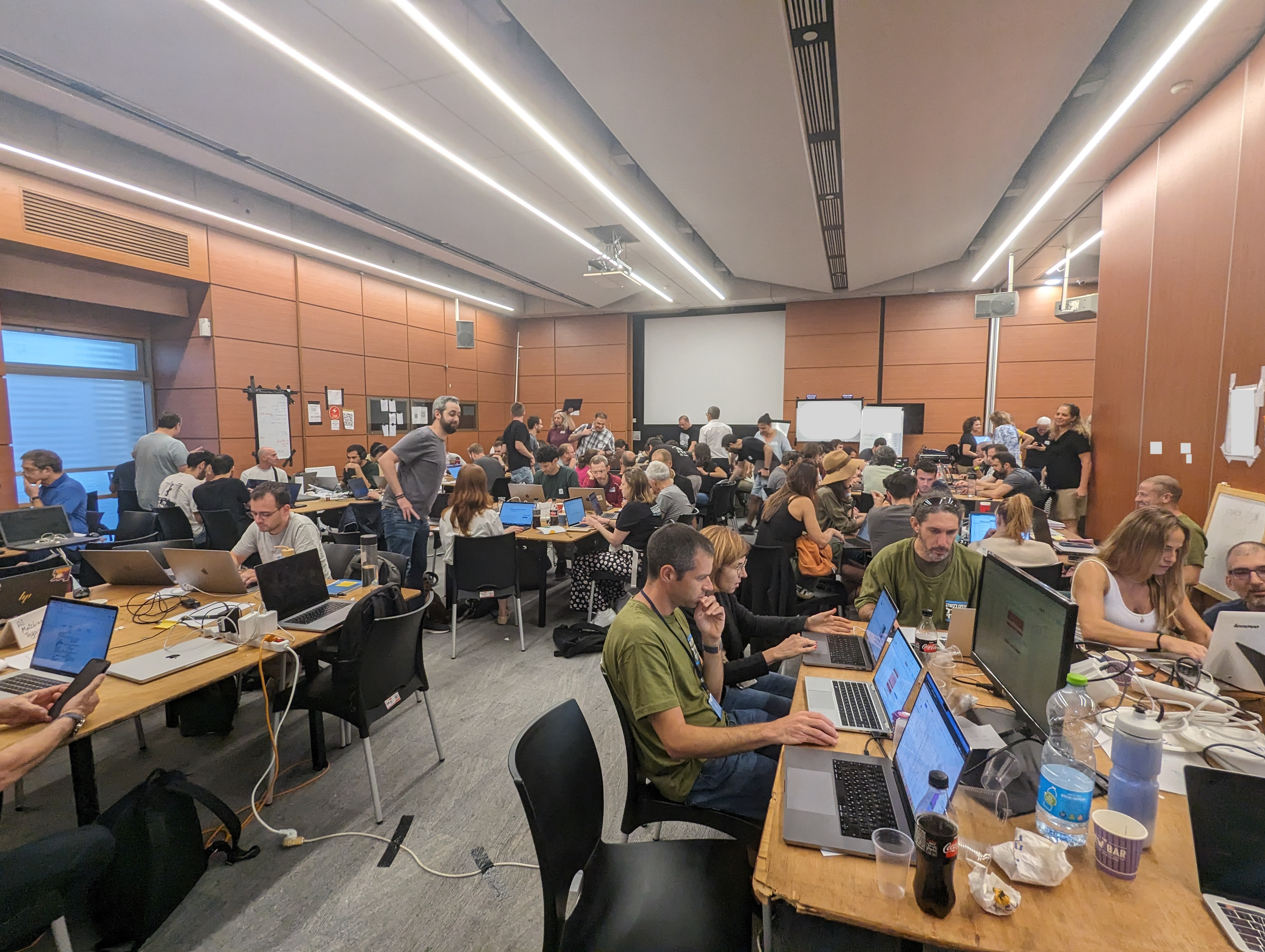
Brothers in Arms Control center for locating missing individuals. October 2023, Tel Aviv

On the morning of October 7, 2023, following the surprise rocket attack, invasion, and massacre by Hamas in the south of Israel, the leaders of the organization announced an immediate halt to all protest activities. They issued a call to reserve soldiers to immediately step up in defense of the country. On the same day, the infrastructure previously used by Brothers and Sisters in Arms for its protest activities was converted into assisting the security forces and providing aid to survivors of the massacre. The organization established dedicated logistic centers in Tel Aviv and Beit Kama, where many aid initiatives were coordinated with the help of tens of thousands of volunteers across the country.

Among the initiatives was the evacuation of some 2,500 families from the conflict zones to safe areas while the IDF forces were engaged in combat. Efforts were made to find housing solutions for displaced families and to provide support to security forces trying to locate missing individuals, using advanced technological resources for this purpose. A support network was established to assist the families of killed, missing, or kidnapped individuals. Further, a transportation system was created to facilitate the movement of reserve soldiers and their families.

Another initiative, First Line Med, was established to collect donations and purchase medical supplies and equipment for army units on the front lines as well as for clinics and security personnel on the home front. The organization also focused on dispensing mental health care treatment for those in need.

Other initiatives have included providing hot meals for the families of the wounded and rescue animals left behind in the conflict zones. Equipment kits have been distributed to grieving families, and a memorial site has been established with information about the fallen soldiers and civilian victims.

On October 12, 2023, US Secretary of State Antony Blinken visited the logistics center at Expo Tel Aviv and expressed his support for this initiative. He later tweeted "I had a chance to visit a donation center in Tel Aviv for the victims of Hamas’ terrorist attack. We are inspired by the solidarity of the Israeli people. America will always be by Israel's side".

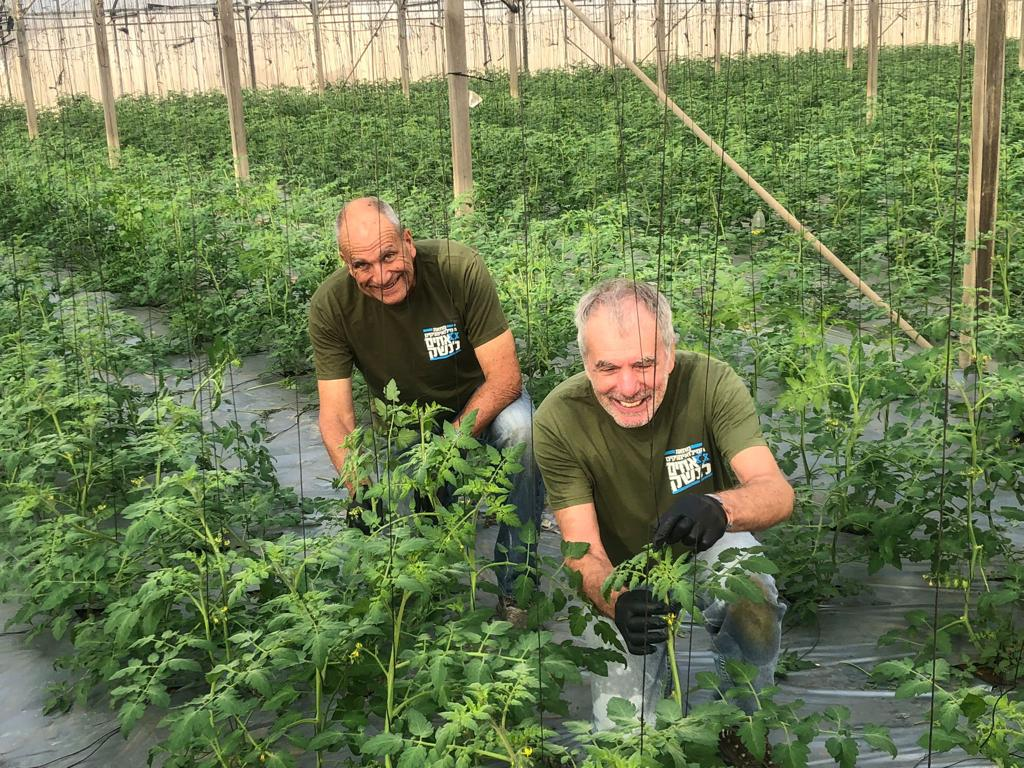
Brothers in Arms volunteers working in an agricultural farm near Gaza border

On October 20, 2023, Brothers and Sisters in Arms volunteers began providing assistance to 24 farms in 11 localities near the border with Gaza, which were suffering from a lack of working hands. In the following days this project grew dramatically, connecting farmers in need with a network of tens of thousands of volunteers.

== Criticism ==
On April 22, Knesset Minister Itamar Ben-Gvir sent a warning letter to "Brothers and Sisters in Arms" following the organization's claim that he had evaded military service. Ben-Gvir called the organization's campaign "a complete lie" and demanded an apology and financial compensation in the amount of ten million shekels. Ben-Gvir said he had wanted to enlist but the IDF turned him down because of his political views.

Yotam Zamri, a panelist on the program "The Patriots" on Channel 14, attacked the organization saying, "I don't understand why their signs are written in Hebrew and not in the original language, German. I recommend that they grow a small moustache." In response, on May 23, 2023, Zamri was sent a warning preceding a lawsuit to be filed on behalf of the organization.

On June 26, 2023, Cabinet Minister Bezalel Smotrich called the organization's activists "trolls" following their announcement that they would revive the threat to stop volunteering for military service. He called on the heads of the security establishment to deal with them severely.

On June 27, 2023, after activists blocked the entrance to the street where he lives, Minister Yariv Levin called the protesters a "violent group" and said that "fortunately or miraculously, they 'limited themselves' this time to burning tires on the road and blocking the street and the entrance to the building parking lot instead of burning down an apartment in the building".

On July 18, 2023, Chief of Staff Lieut.-Gen. Herzi Halevi attacked the organization and said that "anyone who calls for refusing to report for duty these days is harming the IDF, and harming the security of the state." Brothers and Sisters in Arms published the following response: "The Chief of Staff is firing in the wrong direction. The people really responsible for the threat of refusing to volunteer for military duty sit in the government offices and Knesset corridors, tearing the nation apart, tearing the army apart and endangering Israel's security. Israeli patriots are the ones in the streets today, defending Israel as a Jewish and democratic state because a people's army exists only in a democracy."

Prime Minister Benjamin Netanyahu also attacked the reservists for refusing to volunteer. He said, "Their refusal endangers the security of all Israeli citizens. In a democracy, the army is subordinate to the government; the government does not bend to its will. When officials in the army try to dictate the government's policy using threats, this is wrong; that is the end of democracy. Those who drag the IDF into the political debate, those who threaten refusal, should know that refusal on one side inevitably leads to refusal on the other." The organization published the following response: "Those who expected a responsible and unifying leadership on the night of Tisha B'Av received Bibi pressuring, instigating, lying, and deceiving the public. [U.S President Joe] Biden, the governor [of the Bank of Israel], [Former Attorney-General Avichai] Mandelblit, the heads of the security establishment, and the nation have all already told you - only the repeal of the dictatorship laws will save Israel because the 'reasonableness law' constitutes full-blown dictatorship. Just as we have guarded the State of Israel for decades, so we will continue to guard and protect it as a Jewish and democratic state for generations to come. The people's army exists only in a democracy".

On June 29, 2023, several operatives of the organization received messages informing them that their permits to possess a weapon had been cancelled, for what the organization described as "puzzling or incorrect reasons." In some cases, the government's decision could threaten the livelihoods of those affected.

During the main demonstration against the legislative measures in Kaplan, Tel Aviv on July 1, 2023, a violent confrontation took place between activists from Brothers and Sisters in Arms and members of an anti-government group calling itself "the Anti-occupation Bloc". In response, one of the organization's activists sprayed pepper gas on an anti-occupation bloc protester holding a Palestinian flag. A clash ensued between members of the two groups and police detained the assailant for questioning. The incident drew criticism from protest activists and other parties. In response, the organization released a statement saying, "We respect all our partners in the struggle who come from all shades of the political spectrum, from the right and the left. Our goal is one and that is the undoing of the regime coup. We condemn any manifestation of violence, and will continue to fight shoulder to shoulder for the common goal".

== Awards and recognition ==
The organization received the John McCain Award at the Halifax Conference in Canada for its defense of Israeli democracy, and its assistance in the civilian sector since the events of October 7. On November 18, 2023, the Halifax International Security Forum awarded the organization the annual Senator John McCain Award for "extraordinary leadership in the pursuit of human justice".

On January 22, 2024, the organization received the Medal of Home Front Heroes of the Zionist Council in Israel for its activities in the Israeli home front during the war.

On February 28, 2024, the female activists in the organization received the Knighthood of the Peres Center for Peace and Innovation for that year in honour of their activities in providing assistance in a variety of fields after the events of October 7.

In June 2024, the Presidential Award for Volunteerism (formerly the “Presidential Award for Volunteers”) was awarded by the President of the State of Israel, Isaac Herzog, to the logistics centers the organization operated during the Gaza war. In the same month, Reichman University awarded Eyal Naveh an honorary doctorate in recognition of the establishment of the Civil Defense Force.
