= Israeli Basketball Premier League Defensive Player of the Year =

The Israeli Basketball Premier League Defensive Player of the Year, or Israeli Basketball Super League Defensive Player of the Year, is an award given to the best defensive player of each season of the Israeli Basketball Premier League, which is the top-tier level men's professional basketball league in Israel.

== Winners ==
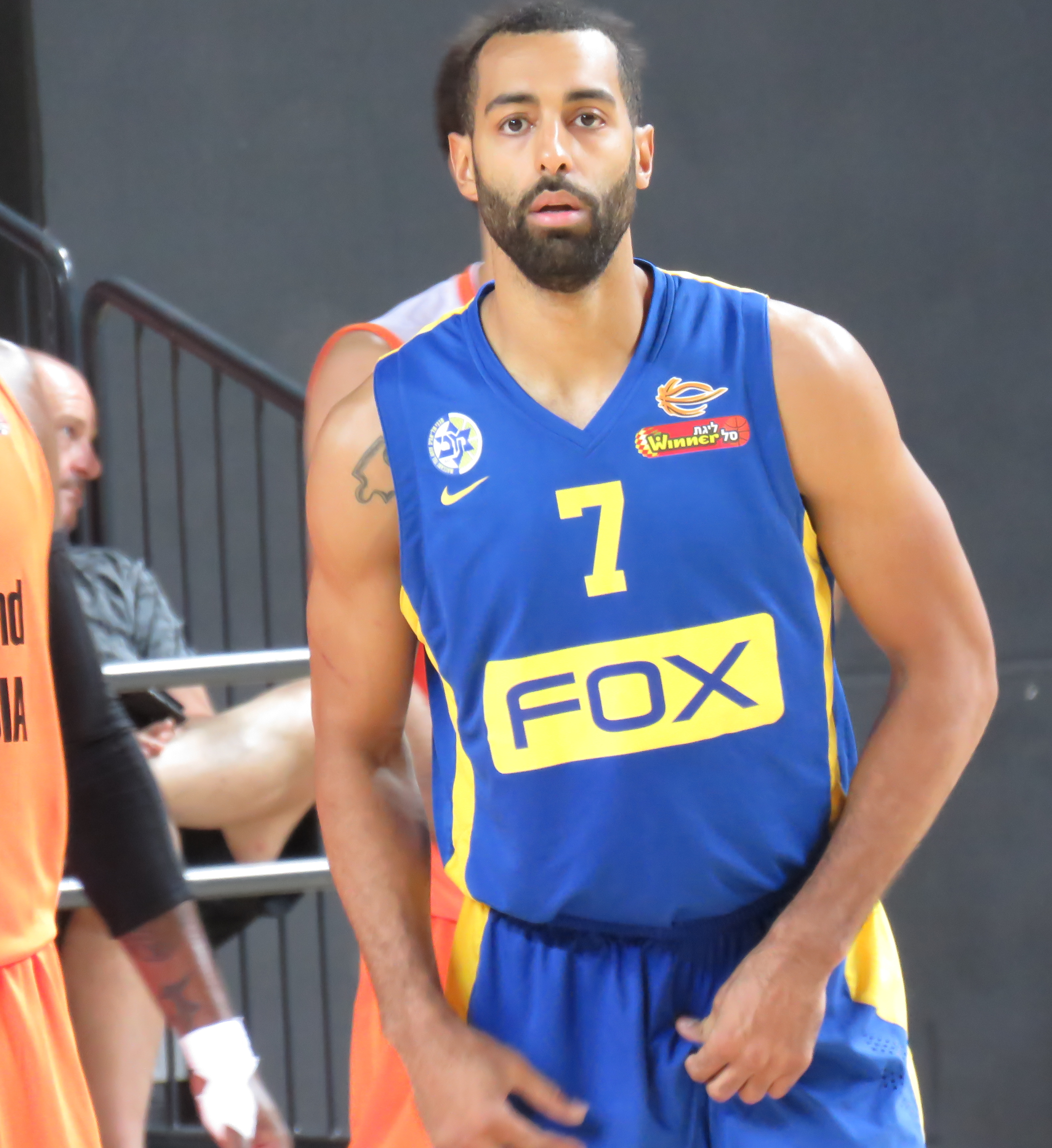
Brian Randle

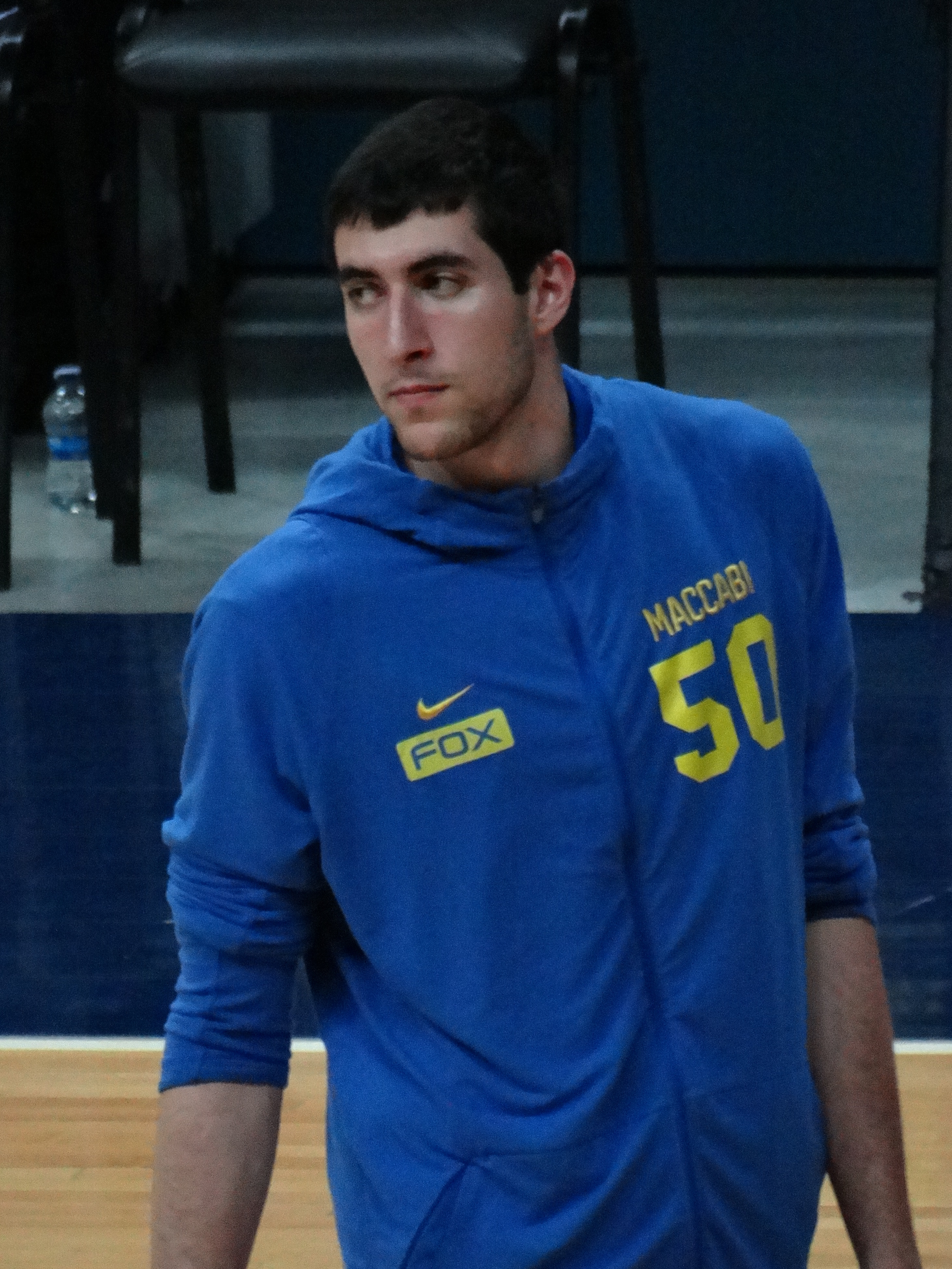
Yovel Zoosman

Season	Defensive Player of the Year	Team
2003–04	(United States) Marcus Norris	Bnei Hasharon
2004–05	(Israel) Erez Katz	Ironi Ashkelon
2005–06	(Mali) Ousmane Cisse	Bnei Hasharon
2006–07	(United States) Terence Morris	Hapoel Jerusalem
2007–08	(United States) Terence Morris (2×)	Maccabi Tel Aviv
2008–09	(United States) Brian Randle	Hapoel Gilboa Galil
2009–10	(United States) Doron Perkins	Maccabi Tel Aviv
2010–11	(United States) Doron Perkins (2×)	Maccabi Tel Aviv
2011–12	(Israel) Nitzan Hanochi	Maccabi Rishon Lezion
2012–13	(United States) Shawn James	Maccabi Tel Aviv
2013–14	(United States) Brian Randle (2×)	Maccabi Haifa
2014–15	(United States) Brian Randle (3×)	Maccabi Tel Aviv
2015–16	(Venezuela) Gregory Vargas	Maccabi Haifa
2016–17	(Venezuela) Gregory Vargas (2×)	Maccabi Haifa
2017–18	(Israel) Joaquin Szuchman	Hapoel Gilboa Galil
2018–19	(United States) TaShawn Thomas	Hapoel Jerusalem
2019–20	(Israel) Yovel Zoosman	Maccabi Tel Aviv
2020–21	(United States) Chris Johnson	Hapoel Holon
2021–22	(United States) Chris Johnson (2×)	Hapoel Holon
2022–23	(Israel) Or Cornelius	Hapoel Jerusalem
2023–24	(Israel) Guy Palatin	Ironi Kiryat Ata
2024–25	(Israel) Yovel Zoosman (2×)	Hapoel Jerusalem
2025–26	(United States) Daeshon Francis	Bnei Herzliya
