= Ef'al Regional Council =

Coordinates: 32°03′N 34°50′E

Ef'al was a regional council in Israel, in the Tel Aviv District which existed from 1950 until 2008 when it was disestablished and most of its area was annexed to the neighbouring cities of Ramat Gan, Kiryat Ono, and Or Yehuda.

Ramat Pinkas was transferred to Or Yehuda, Kfar Azar, and Ramat Ef'al to Ramat Gan, and the area north of Kfar Azar to Kiryat Ono.
