= Ron Scherf =

Israeli social and political activist

- רון שרף
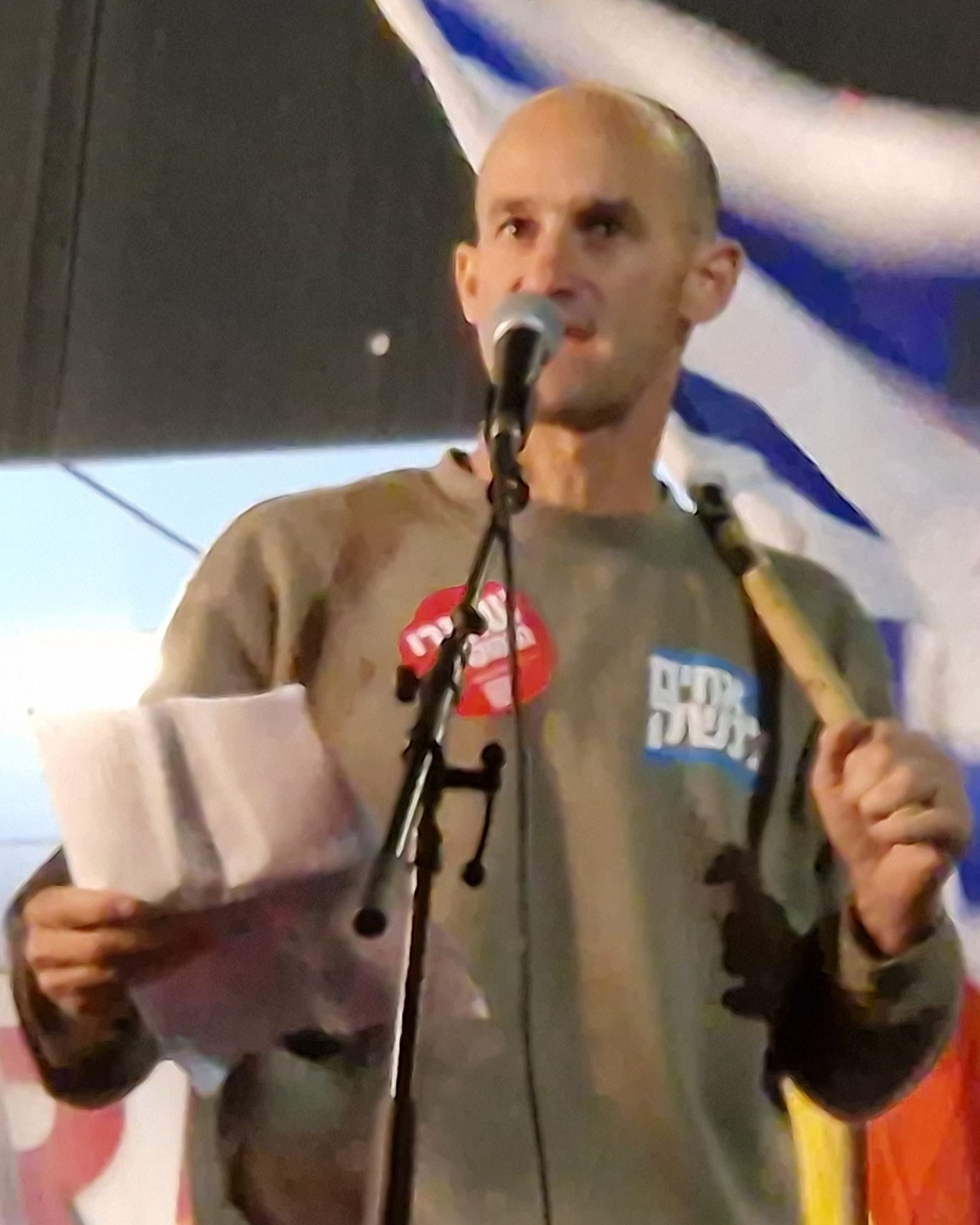
- Ron Scherf delivering a speech at a protest rally in Haifa, 25 March 2023
- Born: February 17, 1972 (age 54); Kfar Saba, Israel
- Education: Tel Aviv University; Reichman University
- Occupation: VP of company
- Organization: Brothers in Arms (Hebrew: אחים לנשק)
- Known for: Social activism

Ron Scherf (Hebrew: רון שרף; born February 17, 1972) is an Israeli social and political activist, a former Lt. Colonel in the Sayeret Matkal unit of the IDF, and one of the founding members and leaders of the "Brothers in Arms" organization standing at the forefront of the protests against judicial reform of the thirty-seventh government of Israel.

== Biography ==
Ron Scherf grew up in Kfar Saba and graduated from Katznelson high school in the city. As a child, he lived for three years in Kenya, where his father worked as an engineer.

He served in the IDF as an officer in the Sayeret Matkal IDF unit. Scherf participated in the May 1994 abduction of Mustafa Dirani, and was the commander of the corresponding rescue force team of Nir Poraz in the Nachshon Wachsman rescue operation. He was released with the rank of lieutenant colonel and since then served as one of the training commanders of the unit.

After his release from the IDF, he worked at several high-tech companies, including Better Place. Since December 2022, he has been the vice president for research and development at Stratasys.

Scherf is a graduate of Tel Aviv University in mechanical engineering and certified by the Herzliya Interdisciplinary Center in business administration.

== Brothers in Arms and the Protests Against Judicial Reform ==
In February 2023, in response to the judicial reforms being pushed by Benjamin Netanyahu's government, Scherf, along with other IDF reservists which included former IDF chief of staff, Moshe Ya'alon, and former IDF general, Tal Russo, decided to march from Latrun to Jerusalem. Scherf stated that they "arrived here on this wintery day in order to march for democracy and to echo publicly and cause everyone to go out and for the people of Israel to join us, the core of IDF reservists who are used to giving back to the country we care about so deeply." Scherf added that "Our goal is to reach the Supreme Court and to strengthen the gatekeepers at this time and to tell them that we are with them."

On March 9, 2023, Scherf was arrested and detained for questioning by police for blocking the entrance to the Givat Shaul offices of the Kohelet Policy Forum which is responsible for pushing the judicial reform. In a self-proclaimed "guerilla operation", Scherf and others from "Brothers In Arms", in a demonstration that included around a hundred people, blocked the entrance to the Kohelet offices with sandbags and barbed wire stating that "everyone knows that Kohelet is hurting the economy and the security of Israel".

In a press conference held on March 21, 2023, Scherf and other leaders from the "Reservists Protest" (Brothers in Arms) stated that if this judicial reform legislation passes, scores of reservists will stop volunteering for reserve duty.

On June 27, 2023, speaking at a protest near the home of Justice Minister, Yariv Levin, Scherf stated that the government is galloping with the legislation without any borders and restrictions and that protests will escalate and that the rage is spewing out from people.

In a radio interview on July 18, 2023, Scherf called on Israeli Defense Minister, Yoav Gallant, to show "presence and leadership" and that canceling the reasonableness clause would serve as an "opening to dictatorship, no less". He continued to state that democracy is defending itself in Israel which is undergoing an existential crisis.

On September 17, 2023, Scherf, along with fellow members of "Brothers and Sisters in Arms", was interviewed by Lesley Stahl for 60 Minutes in a segment dedicated to the protests against the judicial reform.

In June 2024, the Presidential Award for Volunteerism (formerly the “Presidential Award for Volunteers”) was awarded by the President of the State of Israel, Isaac Herzog, to the Civil Defense Force that the organization operated during the Gaza war.
