= Ramat Ef'al =

Neighborhood in Ramat Gan, Israel

Ramat Ef'al רָמַת אֶפְעַל
- Neighborhood of Ramat Gan
- Location within Central Israel
- Coordinates: 32°2′38″N 34°50′5″E
- Country: Israel
- City: Ramat Gan

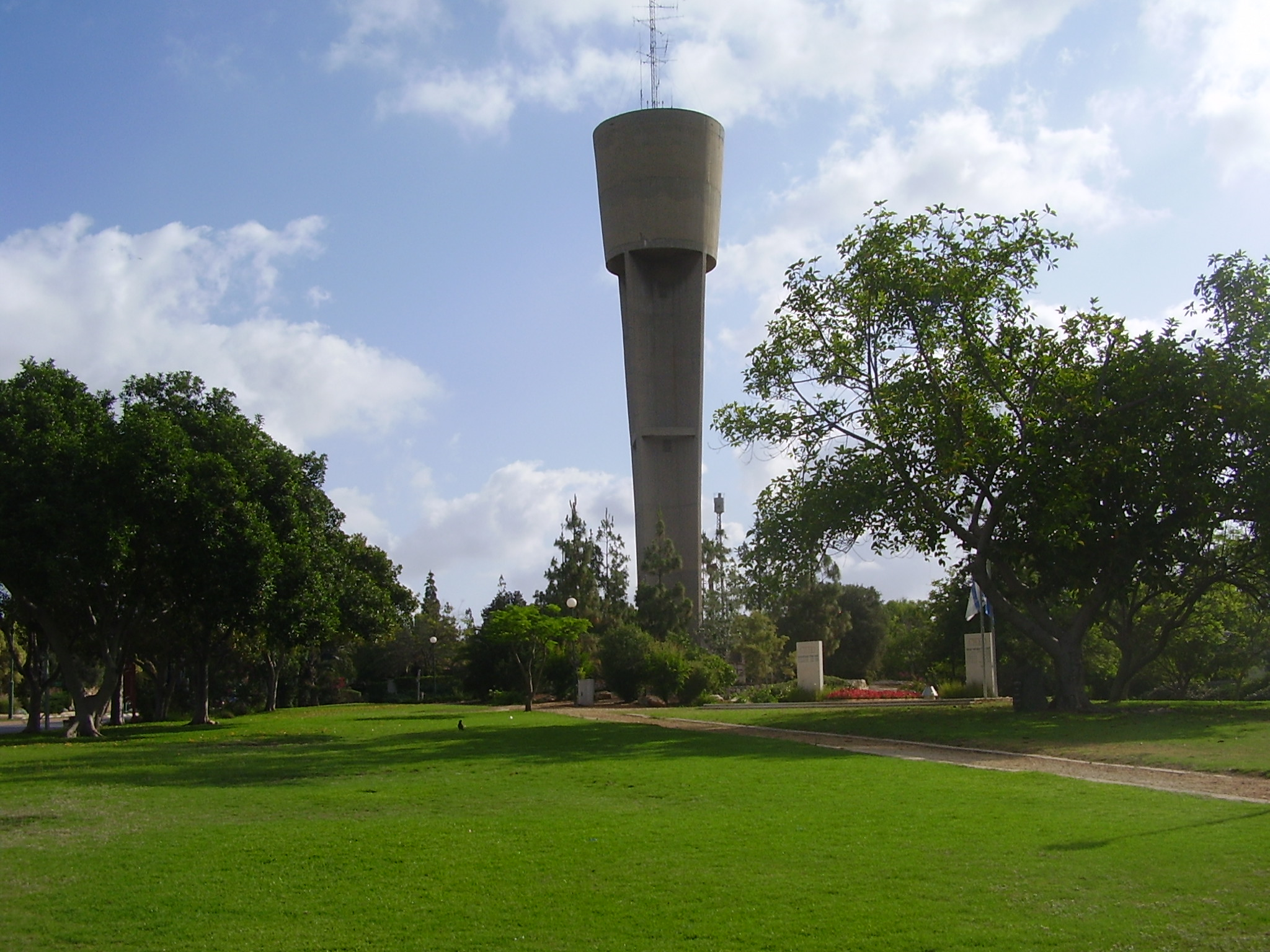
Ramat Efal water tower

Ramat Ef'al (Hebrew: רָמַת אֶפְעַל) is a neighborhood of Ramat Gan in central Israel. Previously part of Ef'al Regional Council, in 2007 it was transferred to the municipality of Ramat Gan together with Kfar Azar.

== History ==
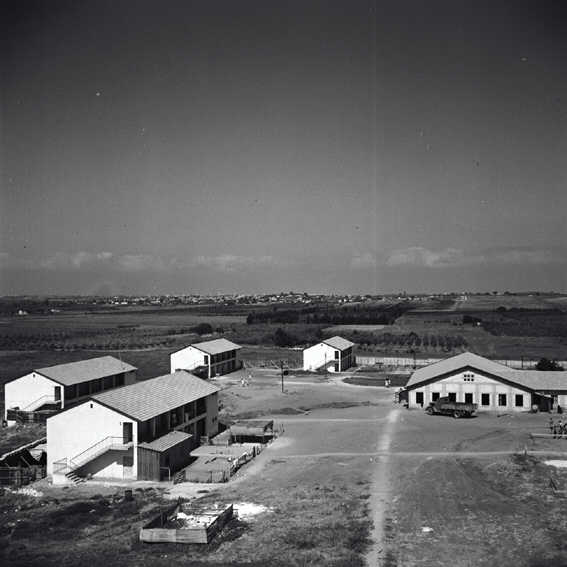
Efal 1940

Ef'al was planned as an urban kibbutz, but due to high real-estate prices it was established on 250 dunams of agricultural land purchased by the Jewish National Fund near Kfar Azar. It was the site of one of the first battles of the 1948 Arab-Israeli War. The first residents arrived in May 1947. On 4 December 1947, the kibbutz was attacked by 120 to 150 attackers from the village of Salame. Defenders, including some Palmach members, fought off the attackers. After the 1948 Arab–Israeli War the kibbutz gained another 1,000 dunams.

Despite the favourable economic situation of the kibbutz, tensions between members working in agriculture and those who worked in the city grew. The split in the HaKibbutz HaMeuhad movement was a further blow to the kibbutz, and departing residents left it weakened. In 1952 it was decided to dissolve the kibbutz.

Following its dissolution, it was proposed that a settlement for 400 immigrants from the United States be built on the land. However, they failed to arrive and instead it was converted into a neighborhood.

During the First Intifada, in 1992, following a high-speed chase, three would-be Hamas suicide bombers were arrested by police forces in Ramat Ef'al. When police inspected their car, they found it rigged with a bomb. During interrogation of the three arrested suspects, Israeli security forces learned the name of the bomb planner - Yahya Ayyash, also known as The Engineer. This was the first known bomb Ayyash made and it had many similarities to his other works.

== Landmarks ==
The Tabenkin Memorial (Yad Tabenkin) in Ramat Ef'al commemorates Yosef Tabenkin and the exploits of the Harel Brigade during the 1948 Arab–Israeli War.

== Notable residents ==
- Doron Sheffer, former professional basketball player
- Carmel Shama, former member of the Knesset
