= 2025–26 EuroLeague regular season =

International basketball club competition in Europe

The 2025–26 EuroLeague regular season began on 30 September 2025 and ended on 17 April 2026. A total of 20 teams competed in the regular season to decide the 10 places in the postseason of the 2025–26 EuroLeague.

A total of ten countries were represented in the regular season. This is the tenth season with the round-robin format, which replaces the group format used until the 2015–16 season. Dubai Basketball made its debut in European competitions, despite not being a European club.

== Format ==
The regular season began on 30 September 2025 and concluded on 17 April 2026. The 20 teams played against each other home-and-away in a round-robin format over 38 rounds, where only 10 teams advanced to the postseason. Moreover, the top six teams from regular season have received a bye to the playoffs, while the teams placed from 7th to 10th will participate in the play-in to get the last two playoff spots. At the tail end of the standings, teams placed from 11th to 20th were eliminated after the regular season.

=== Tiebreakers ===
Teams were ranked according to their win–loss record. If two or more teams were equal on win–loss record upon completion of the regular season, the following tiebreaking criteria were applied, in the order given, to determine their rankings:

1. Best record in head-to-head games between all tied teams.
2. Higher cumulative score difference in head-to-head games between all tied teams.
3. Higher cumulative score difference for the entire regular season.
4. Higher total of points scored for the entire regular season.
5. Higher sum of quotients of points in favor and points against of each match played in the regular season.

If a tiebreaker does not resolve a tie completely, a new tiebreak process is initiated with only those teams that remain tied. All points scored in extra periods will not be counted in the standings, nor for any tie-break situation.

== Schedule ==
Below is the schedule of the regular season for the 2025–26 EuroLeague.

Round	Dates
Round 1	30 September–1 October 2025
Round 2	2–3 October 2025
Round 3	8–10 October 2025
Round 4	14–15 October 2025
Round 5	16–17 October 2025
Round 6	22–24 October 2025
Round 7	28–29 October 2025
Round 8	30–31 October 2025
Round 9	6–7 November 2025
Round 10	11–12 November 2025
Round 11	13–14 November 2025
Round 12	19–21 November 2025
Round 13	25–26 November 2025
Round 14	4–5 December 2025
Round 15	11–12 December 2025
Round 16	16–17 December 2025
Round 17	18–19 December 2025
Round 18	23 & 26 December 2025
Round 19	30 December 2025 & 2 January 2026

Round	Dates
Round 20	6–7 January 2026
Round 21	8–9 January 2026
Round 22	14–16 January 2026
Round 23	20–21 January 2026
Round 24	22–23 January 2026
Round 25	27, 29 & 30 January 2026
Round 26	3–4 February 2026
Round 27	5–6 February 2026
Round 28	12–13 February 2026
Round 29	25–26 February 2026
Round 30	5–6 March 2026
Round 31	12–13 March 2026
Round 32	19–20 March 2026
Round 33	24–25 March 2026
Round 34	26–27 March 2026
Round 35	1–3 April 2026
Round 36	7–8 April 2026
Round 37	9–10 April 2026
Round 38	16–17 April 2026

== League table ==
Pos	Team	Pld	W	L	PF	PA	PD	Qualification
1	(Hellenic Basketball Federation) Olympiacos	38	26	12	3406	3144	+262	Qualification to playoffs
2	(Spanish Basketball Federation) Valencia Basket	38	25	13	3418	3243	+175	Qualification to playoffs
3	(Spanish Basketball Federation) Real Madrid	38	24	14	3342	3156	+186	Qualification to playoffs
4	(Turkish Basketball Federation) Fenerbahçe Beko	38	24	14	3114	3061	+53	Qualification to playoffs
5	(Lithuanian Basketball Federation) Žalgiris	38	23	15	3304	3125	+179	Qualification to playoffs
6	(Israeli Basketball Association) Hapoel IBI Tel Aviv	38	23	15	3329	3211	+118	Qualification to playoffs
7	(Hellenic Basketball Federation) Panathinaikos AKTOR	38	22	16	3314	3228	+86	Qualification to play-in
8	(French Federation of Basketball) Monaco	38	22	16	3417	3282	+135	Qualification to play-in
9	(Spanish Basketball Federation) Barcelona	38	21	17	3167	3147	+20	Qualification to play-in
10	(Basketball Federation of Serbia) Crvena zvezda Meridianbet	38	21	17	3287	3245	+42	Qualification to play-in
11	(United Arab Emirates Basketball Association) Dubai Basketball	38	19	19	3324	3325	−1	
12	(Israeli Basketball Association) Maccabi Rapyd Tel Aviv	38	18	20	3386	3486	−100	
13	(German Basketball Federation) Bayern Munich	38	17	21	3063	3168	−105	
14	(Italian Basketball Federation) EA7 Emporio Armani Milan	38	17	21	3246	3294	−48	
15	(Basketball Federation of Serbia) Partizan Mozzart Bet	38	16	22	3052	3242	−190	
16	(French Federation of Basketball) Paris Basketball	38	15	23	3422	3456	−34	
17	(Italian Basketball Federation) Virtus Bologna	38	14	24	3110	3285	−175	
18	(Spanish Basketball Federation) Kosner Baskonia	38	13	25	3321	3483	−162	
19	(Turkish Basketball Federation) Anadolu Efes	38	12	26	2991	3151	−160	
20	(French Federation of Basketball) LDLC ASVEL	38	8	30	2989	3270	−281	

Source: EuroLeague
Rules for classification: Regular season tiebreakers

== Round by round tables ==
=== Positions by round ===
The table lists the positions of teams after completion of each round. In order to preserve chronological evolvements, any postponed matches are not included in the round at which they were originally scheduled, but added to the full round they were played immediately afterwards.

Leader and qualification to playoffs	Qualification to playoffs	Qualification to play-in

Team ╲ Round	1	2	3	4	5	6	7	8	9	10	11	12	13	14	15	16	17	18	19	20	21	22	23	24	25	26	27	28	29	30	31	32	33	34	35	36	37	38
Olympiacos	7	13	4	8	8	2	5	4	4	3	4	2	6	7	10	11	10	7	7	8	8	7	7	5	2	2	2	2	3	3	2	2	2	2	1	1	1	1
Valencia Basket	10	2	6	9	15	12	8	6	7	6	8	7	7	4	2	2	3	2	1	2	3	4	4	7	4	5	3	3	2	2	4	5	4	4	4	2	2	2
Real Madrid	14	7	3	2	7	10	11	9	6	9	11	10	10	10	9	9	9	10	10	6	6	5	5	3	5	4	6	4	4	4	3	4	3	3	3	5	3	3
Fenerbahçe Beko	1	5	11	17	14	9	12	16	13	11	10	8	8	8	4	5	5	5	3	3	5	3	2	2	1	1	1	1	1	1	1	1	1	1	2	3	4	4
Žalgiris	9	3	1	1	5	4	2	1	1	2	3	5	4	9	6	8	7	8	8	9	9	9	9	8	10	9	9	7	6	6	7	6	6	6	6	7	6	5
Hapoel IBI Tel Aviv	2	1	5	5	2	1	1	3	3	1	1	1	1	1	1	1	1	1	2	1	1	1	1	1	3	3	5	6	5	5	5	3	5	5	5	4	5	6
Panathinaikos AKTOR	5	9	7	6	1	7	4	7	8	7	5	4	3	5	8	4	4	3	5	7	7	8	8	9	8	6	8	9	10	10	9	8	8	7	7	6	8	7
Monaco	12	4	2	7	3	8	7	5	5	5	9	6	5	2	5	6	6	6	4	4	2	2	3	6	7	10	10	8	9	9	8	7	7	10	10	8	9	8
Barcelona	19	14	9	3	6	11	9	8	9	8	6	9	9	6	3	3	2	4	6	5	4	6	6	4	6	8	4	5	8	8	10	10	10	8	8	9	10	9
Crvena zvezda Meridianbet	17	20	16	12	9	5	3	2	2	4	2	3	2	3	7	7	8	9	9	10	10	10	10	10	9	7	7	10	7	7	6	9	9	9	9	10	7	10
Dubai Basketball	3	15	19	11	10	13	13	14	15	15	13	14	13	13	12	13	13	12	13	13	13	13	13	12	13	13	12	11	11	11	11	11	11	12	12	11	11	11
Maccabi Rapyd Tel Aviv	15	19	13	19	19	17	19	18	19	19	18	19	19	19	16	14	14	14	14	14	14	14	14	14	14	14	14	13	13	13	13	13	12	11	11	12	12	12
Bayern Munich	16	10	18	15	17	19	16	12	10	13	15	16	16	18	19	19	19	19	18	16	17	16	16	15	15	15	15	14	15	15	14	14	16	15	15	14	13	13
EA7 Emporio Armani Milan	4	6	12	16	13	15	17	13	12	10	7	11	11	11	11	10	11	11	12	12	11	11	12	13	12	11	11	12	12	12	12	12	13	13	13	13	14	14
Partizan Mozzart Bet	18	16	10	14	11	14	15	17	18	16	17	18	18	16	14	17	17	18	20	20	20	20	18	17	18	18	17	19	19	17	17	16	15	14	14	15	16	15
Paris Basketball	20	17	8	4	4	3	6	10	11	14	12	13	14	14	15	18	18	15	15	15	15	17	17	18	17	17	18	16	16	16	16	17	17	17	16	16	15	16
Virtus Bologna	8	12	17	13	12	6	10	11	14	12	14	12	12	12	13	12	12	13	11	11	12	12	11	11	11	12	13	15	14	14	15	15	14	16	17	17	18	17
Kosner Baskonia	13	18	20	20	20	20	20	19	17	18	19	17	17	15	17	15	15	16	16	17	16	15	15	16	16	16	16	18	18	19	19	19	19	18	18	18	17	18
Anadolu Efes	6	11	14	10	16	18	14	15	16	17	16	15	15	17	18	16	16	17	17	18	18	18	19	19	19	19	19	17	17	18	18	18	18	19	19	19	19	19
LDLC ASVEL	11	8	15	18	18	16	18	20	20	20	20	20	20	20	20	20	20	20	19	19	19	19	20	20	20	20	20	20	20	20	20	20	20	20	20	20	20	20

Source: EuroLeague

=== Results by round ===
The table lists the results of teams in each round.

Win	Loss

Team ╲ Round	1	2	3	4	5	6	7	8	9	10	11	12	13	14	15	16	17	18	19	20	21	22	23	24	25	26	27	28	29	30	31	32	33	34	35	36	37	38
Anadolu Efes	W	L	L	W	L	L	W	L	L	L	W	W	L	L	L	W	L	L	L	L	L	L	L	L	L	W	W	W	L	L	W	L	L	L	L	W	W	L
Barcelona	L	W	W	W	L	L	W	W	L	W	W	L	W	W	W	W	W	L	L	W	W	L	W	W	L	L	W	L	L	L	L	W	W	W	L	L	L	W
Bayern Munich	L	W	L	W	L	L	W	W	W	L	L	L	L	L	L	L	L	L	W	W	L	W	L	W	W	W	W	L	L	W	L	L	L	W	W	W	W	L
Crvena zvezda Meridianbet	L	L	W	W	W	W	W	W	W	L	W	L	W	L	L	L	W	L	W	L	L	W	W	W	W	W	L	L	W	L	W	L	W	L	L	W	W	L
Dubai Basketball	W	L	L	W	W	L	L	L	L	W	W	L	W	L	W	L	W	W	L	L	W	L	L	W	L	W	W	W	W	L	W	W	L	L	W	W	L	L
EA7 Emporio Armani Milan	W	L	L	L	W	L	L	W	W	W	W	L	W	L	W	W	L	L	L	W	W	L	L	L	W	W	W	L	L	W	W	L	L	W	L	L	L	L
Fenerbahçe Beko	W	L	L	L	W	W	L	L	W	W	W	W	W	L	W	L	W	W	W	W	L	W	W	W	W	W	W	W	W	W	L	W	L	L	L	L	L	W
Hapoel IBI Tel Aviv	W	W	L	W	W	W	W	L	W	W	L	W	L	W	W	W	L	W	L	W	W	W	W	L	L	L	L	L	W	W	W	W	L	L	W	W	L	L
Kosner Baskonia	L	L	L	L	L	L	W	W	W	L	L	W	L	W	L	W	L	L	L	L	W	W	L	L	W	L	L	L	L	L	L	L	L	W	W	W	W	L
LDLC ASVEL	L	W	L	L	L	W	L	L	L	L	W	L	L	L	L	W	L	W	W	L	L	L	L	L	L	W	L	L	L	W	L	L	L	L	L	L	L	L
Maccabi Rapyd Tel Aviv	L	L	W	L	L	W	L	L	L	L	W	L	L	W	W	W	W	W	L	L	L	W	L	W	L	W	W	W	W	L	L	W	W	W	W	L	L	L
Monaco	L	W	W	L	W	L	W	W	W	L	L	W	W	W	L	L	W	W	W	W	W	W	L	L	L	L	L	W	L	L	W	W	W	L	L	W	W	W
Olympiacos	W	L	W	L	W	W	L	W	W	W	L	W	L	W	L	L	W	W	W	L	W	W	W	W	W	L	W	W	L	W	L	W	L	W	W	W	W	W
Panathinaikos AKTOR	W	L	W	W	W	L	W	L	L	W	W	W	W	L	L	W	W	W	L	L	W	L	W	L	W	W	L	L	L	L	W	W	W	W	L	W	L	W
Paris Basketball	L	W	W	W	L	W	L	L	L	L	W	L	L	L	L	L	L	W	L	W	L	L	L	L	W	L	L	W	W	W	W	L	W	L	W	L	W	L
Partizan Mozzart Bet	L	W	W	L	W	L	L	L	L	W	L	L	L	W	W	L	L	L	L	L	L	L	W	W	L	L	W	L	L	W	W	W	W	W	W	L	L	W
Real Madrid	L	W	W	W	L	L	L	W	W	L	L	W	W	W	W	L	W	L	W	W	W	W	W	W	L	L	L	W	W	W	W	L	W	W	L	L	W	W
Valencia Basket	W	W	L	L	L	W	W	W	L	W	L	W	W	W	W	W	L	W	W	W	L	L	W	L	W	L	W	W	W	W	L	L	W	L	W	W	W	W
Virtus Bologna	W	L	L	W	W	W	L	L	L	W	L	W	L	W	L	W	L	L	W	W	L	W	L	L	W	L	L	L	W	L	L	L	L	L	L	L	L	W
Žalgiris	W	W	W	L	L	W	W	W	W	L	L	L	W	L	W	L	W	L	W	L	W	L	W	W	L	W	L	W	W	L	L	W	W	W	W	L	W	W

Source: EuroLeague

== Matches ==
Times are CET or CEST, (Note: CEST (UTC+2) for dates up to 26 October 2025 (rounds 1–6) and from 29 March 2026 (rounds 35–38), and CET (UTC+1) for dates between 27 October 2025 and 28 March 2026 (rounds 7–34).) as listed by Euroleague Basketball.

=== Round 1 ===
30 September 2025	Hapoel IBI Tel Aviv (Israeli Basketball Association)	103–87	(Spanish Basketball Federation) Barcelona	Sofia (Note: From Round 1 to Round 14 of the 2025–26 EuroLeague season, Hapoel IBI Tel Aviv played their home matches in Bulgaria (Sofia and Botevgrad) due to the inability to host matches in Israel as a result of the Gaza war.)
18:00	Scoring by quarter: 26–26, 25–19, 31–25, 21–17
	Pts: Blakeney 20; Rebs: three players 4 Asts: Bryant 8 PIR: Blakeney 22	Boxscore	Pts: Clyburn 23; Rebs: Clyburn, Shengelia 7 Asts: Satoranský 4 PIR: Clyburn 30	Arena: Arena 8888 Sofia; Attendance: 8,000; Referees: Saša Pukl, Tomislav Hordov, Thomas Bissuel

30 September 2025	Dubai Basketball (United Arab Emirates Basketball Association)	89–76	(Basketball Federation of Serbia) Partizan Mozzart Bet	Dubai
18:00	Scoring by quarter: 28–18, 19–22, 21–16, 21–20
	Pts: Bertāns 20; Rebs: Petrušev 8 Asts: Wright 7 PIR: Bertāns 26	Boxscore	Pts: T. Jones 13; Rebs: Bonga 8 Asts: C. Jones 6 PIR: T. Jones 17	Arena: Coca-Cola Arena; Attendance: 6,063; Referees: Miguel Ángel Pérez, Piotr Pastusiak, Alberto Baena

30 September 2025	Anadolu Efes (Turkish Basketball Federation)	85–78	(Israeli Basketball Association) Maccabi Rapyd Tel Aviv	Podgorica (Note: Anadolu Efes' home games against Israeli teams (Maccabi and Hapoel) were relocated to Montenegro on recommendation of both Turkish and Israeli governments regarding the Gaza war.)
19:45	Scoring by quarter: 21–19, 19–25, 20–15, 25–19
	Pts: Loyd, Šmits 16; Rebs: Papagiannis 7 Asts: Larkin 5 PIR: Weiler-Babb 19	Boxscore	Pts: Hoard, Sorkin 15; Rebs: Hoard 9 Asts: Blatt 9 PIR: Hoard 22	Arena: Morača Sports Center; Attendance: 2,110; Referees: Damir Javor, Jordi Aliaga, Guido Giovannetti

30 September 2025	Crvena zvezda Meridianbet (Basketball Federation of Serbia)	82–92	(Italian Basketball Federation) EA7 Emporio Armani Milan	Belgrade
20:00	Scoring by quarter: 20–22, 21–23, 22–24, 19–23
	Pts: Nwora 19; Rebs: Moneke 8 Asts: Miller-McIntyre 6 PIR: Nwora 19	Boxscore	Pts: LeDay 21; Rebs: three players 5 Asts: Mannion 5 PIR: LeDay 25	Arena: Belgrade Arena; Attendance: 17,382; Referees: Carlos Peruga, Emilio Pérez, Seffi Shemmesh

30 September 2025	Panathinaikos AKTOR (Hellenic Basketball Federation)	87–79	(German Basketball Federation) Bayern Munich	Marousi
20:15	Scoring by quarter: 23–22, 24–19, 21–20, 19–18
	Pts: Nunn 21; Rebs: Rogkavopoulos, Yurtseven 5 Asts: Nunn 10; PIR: Nunn 29	Boxscore	Pts: Mike, Rathan-Mayes 18; Rebs: Lučić 8 Asts: Rathan-Mayes 8 PIR: Rathan-Mayes 26	Arena: Telekom Center Athens; Attendance: 18,480; Referees: Ilija Belošević, Uroš Nikolić, Maxime Boubert

30 September 2025	Baskonia (Spanish Basketball Federation)	96–102	(Hellenic Basketball Federation) Olympiacos	Vitoria-Gasteiz
20:30	Scoring by quarter: 20–27, 28–22, 22–24, 26–29
	Pts: Luwawu-Cabarrot 23; Rebs: Diop 7 Asts: Forrest 10; PIR: Luwawu-Cabarrot 25	Boxscore	Pts: Vezenkov 24; Rebs: Milutinov 14; Asts: Walkup 8 PIR: Milutinov, Vezenkov 27	Arena: Buesa Arena; Attendance: 8,572; Referees: Robert Lottermoser, Milan Nedović, Marcin Kowalski

30 September 2025	Virtus Bologna (Italian Basketball Federation)	74–68	(Spanish Basketball Federation) Real Madrid	Bologna
20:45	Scoring by quarter: 14–19, 24–16, 17–15, 19–18
	Pts: Edwards 14; Rebs: Smailagić, Niang 4 Asts: Niang 3 PIR: Niang 16	Boxscore	Pts: Hezonja 14; Rebs: Okeke 7 Asts: Campazzo 5 PIR: Campazzo, Deck 13	Arena: PalaDozza; Attendance: 5,471; Referees: Mehdi Difallah, Gytis Vilius, Steve Bittner

1 October 2025	Monaco (French Federation of Basketball)	84–89	(Lithuanian Basketball Federation) Žalgiris	Fontvieille
19:30	Scoring by quarter: 20–27, 15–18, 25–22, 24–22
	Pts: James 24; Rebs: Mirotić, Theis 6 Asts: Okobo 7 PIR: Mirotić, Theis 23	Boxscore	Pts: Wright 21; Rebs: Wright 6 Asts: Francisco 9 PIR: Wright 28	Arena: Salle Gaston Médecin; Attendance: 4,221; Referees: Emin Moğulkoç, Rain Peerandi, Igor Dragojević

1 October 2025	Fenerbahçe Beko (Turkish Basketball Federation)	96–77	(French Federation of Basketball) Paris Basketball	Istanbul
19:45	Scoring by quarter: 25–19, 18–21, 27–19, 26–18
	Pts: Hall 22; Rebs: Melli 6 Asts: Baldwin 10; PIR: Hall 23	Boxscore	Pts: Hifi 23; Rebs: Dokossi 10; Asts: Dokossi 3 PIR: Hifi 18	Arena: Ülker Sports and Event Hall; Attendance: 10,414; Referees: Juan Carlos García, Artūras Šukys, Sérgio Silva

1 October 2025	LDLC ASVEL (French Federation of Basketball)	77–80	(Spanish Basketball Federation) Valencia Basket	Villeurbanne
20:00	Scoring by quarter: 18–19, 17–15, 26–26, 16–20
	Pts: de Colo 17; Rebs: Seljaas 9 Asts: de Colo 4 PIR: de Colo 22	Boxscore	Pts: Thompson 15; Rebs: Costello 10; Asts: Moore 10; PIR: Moore 23	Arena: Astroballe; Attendance: 4,671; Referees: Sreten Radović, Miloš Koljenšić, Saulius Račys

=== Round 2 ===
2 October 2025	Partizan Mozzart Bet (Basketball Federation of Serbia)	80–78	(Italian Basketball Federation) EA7 Emporio Armani Milan	Belgrade
20:30	Scoring by quarter: 21–19, 24–14, 24–29, 11–16
	Pts: Brown 20; Rebs: Bonga 6 Asts: Jones 5 PIR: Brown 25	Boxscore	Pts: Shields 21; Rebs: Nebo 6 Asts: Gudurić 8 PIR: Shields 26	Arena: Belgrade Arena; Attendance: 19,214; Referees: Mehdi Difallah, Carlos Cortés, Kristaps Konstantinovs

2 October 2025	Bayern Munich (German Basketball Federation)	97–88	(Basketball Federation of Serbia) Crvena zvezda Meridianbet	Munich
20:30	Scoring by quarter: 24–28, 26–27, 27–16, 20–17
	Pts: Obst 31; Rebs: McCormack 5 Asts: Jović 7 PIR: Obst 30	Boxscore	Pts: Nwora 27; Rebs: Moneke 6 Asts: Miller-McIntyre 4 PIR: Nwora 29	Arena: SAP Garden; Attendance: 11,500; Referees: Oļegs Latiševs, Ioannis Foufis, Robert Vyklický

2 October 2025	Real Madrid (Spanish Basketball Federation)	89–77	(Hellenic Basketball Federation) Olympiacos	Madrid
20:45	Scoring by quarter: 19–29, 28–24, 17–16, 25–8
	Pts: Hezonja 18; Rebs: Deck 6 Asts: Campazzo 8 PIR: Hezonja 18	Boxscore	Pts: Dorsey 20; Rebs: Milutinov, Vezenkov 9 Asts: Fournier 5 PIR: Milutinov 17	Arena: Movistar Arena; Attendance: 7,920; Referees: Damir Javor, Uroš Nikolić, Dragan Porobić

3 October 2025	Žalgiris (Lithuanian Basketball Federation)	84–81	(Turkish Basketball Federation) Fenerbahçe Beko	Kaunas
19:00	Scoring by quarter: 29–20, 14–17, 22–16, 19–28
	Pts: Williams-Goss 20; Rebs: four players 4 Asts: Francisco, Ulanovas 4 PIR: Williams-Goss 23	Boxscore	Pts: Baldwin 36; Rebs: Horton-Tucker 6 Asts: Baldwin, Hall 4 PIR: Baldwin 34	Arena: Žalgirio Arena; Attendance: 15,203; Referees: Ilija Belošević, Jakub Zamojski, Anne Panther

3 October 2025	Monaco (French Federation of Basketball)	103–81	(United Arab Emirates Basketball Association) Dubai Basketball	Fontvieille
19:30	Scoring by quarter: 26–23, 24–23, 29–13, 24–22
	Pts: Mirotić 19; Rebs: Mirotić 7 Asts: James 8 PIR: Mirotić 32	Boxscore	Pts: Kabengele 16; Rebs: Petrušev 8 Asts: Kabengele, Bacon 4 PIR: Petrušev 25	Arena: Salle Gaston Médecin; Attendance: 4,137; Referees: Juan Carlos García, Eduard Udyanskyy, Vasiliki Tsaroucha

3 October 2025	Anadolu Efes (Turkish Basketball Federation)	81–87	(Israeli Basketball Association) Hapoel IBI Tel Aviv	Podgorica
19:30	Scoring by quarter: 22–21, 24–14, 13–26, 22–26
	Pts: Loyd 25; Rebs: Osmani 7 Asts: Weiler-Babb, Larkin 3 PIR: Loyd 29	Boxscore	Pts: Blakeney 17; Rebs: Oturu 9 Asts: Micić 6 PIR: Oturu 17	Arena: Morača Sports Center; Attendance: 2,788; Referees: Carlos Peruga, Joseph Bissang, Luka Kardum

3 October 2025	LDLC ASVEL (French Federation of Basketball)	102–95	(Spanish Basketball Federation) Baskonia	Décines-Charpieu
20:00	Scoring by quarter: 26–33, 22–12, 29–21, 25–29
	Pts: Seljaas 23; Rebs: Ndiaye, Vautier 5 Asts: de Colo, Lighty 4 PIR: Seljaas 25	Boxscore	Pts: Luwawu-Cabarrot 18; Rebs: Forrest, Diallo 8 Asts: Forrest 6 PIR: Forrest 20	Arena: LDLC Arena; Attendance: 8,276; Referees: Emin Moğulkoç, Borys Ryzhyk, Josip Radojković

3 October 2025	Panathinaikos AKTOR (Hellenic Basketball Federation)	96–103	(Spanish Basketball Federation) Barcelona	Marousi
20:15	Scoring by quarter: 17–26, 28–25, 24–24, 27–28
	Pts: J. Hernangómez 27; Rebs: Mitoglou, J. Hernangómez 8 Asts: Sloukas 11; PIR: J. Hernangómez 39	Boxscore	Pts: Clyburn 23; Rebs: Clyburn, W. Hernangómez 6 Asts: Laprovíttola 9 PIR: Clyburn 26	Arena: Telekom Center Athens; Attendance: 18,492; Referees: Robert Lottermoser, Milivoje Jovčić, Sašo Petek

3 October 2025	Valencia Basket (Spanish Basketball Federation)	103–94	(Italian Basketball Federation) Virtus Bologna	Valencia
20:30	Scoring by quarter: 26–23, 23–23, 26–25, 28–23
	Pts: de Larrea 23; Rebs: Pradilla 8 Asts: Moore 6 PIR: de Larrea 23	Boxscore	Pts: Morgan 24; Rebs: Niang 5 Asts: Pajola 8 PIR: Pajola 17	Arena: Roig Arena; Attendance: 14,606; Referees: Saša Pukl, Milan Nedović, Artūras Šukys

3 October 2025	Maccabi Rapyd Tel Aviv (Israeli Basketball Association)	94–101	(French Federation of Basketball) Paris Basketball	Belgrade (Note: From 2023 until the end of November 2025, Maccabi Playtika Tel Aviv played their home matches in Belgrade due to the inability to host matches in Israel as a result of the Gaza war.)
21:30	Scoring by quarter: 20–27, 21–21, 22–26, 31–27
	Pts: Walker, Dowtin 16; Rebs: Brissett, Leaf 6 Asts: Dowtin 6 PIR: Hoard, Dowtin 19	Boxscore	Pts: Hifi 21; Rebs: Dokossi 13; Asts: Dokossi, Morgan 4 PIR: Dokossi 23	Arena: Aleksandar Nikolić Hall; Attendance: 201; Referees: Emilio Pérez, Piotr Pastusiak, Tomasz Trawicki

=== Round 3 ===
8 October 2025	Hapoel IBI Tel Aviv (Israeli Basketball Association)	90–103	(Israeli Basketball Association) Maccabi Rapyd Tel Aviv	Sofia
20:05	Scoring by quarter: 25–24, 20–21, 25–27, 20–31
	Pts: Bryant 18; Rebs: Malcolm 5 Asts: Micić 4 PIR: Oturu 21	Boxscore	Pts: Walker 20; Rebs: Blatt, Brissett 4 Asts: Blatt 7 PIR: Brissett 22	Arena: Arena 8888 Sofia; Attendance: 3,595; Referees: Ilija Belošević, Uroš Nikolić, Michele Rossi

9 October 2025	Partizan Mozzart Bet (Basketball Federation of Serbia)	93–87	(Turkish Basketball Federation) Anadolu Efes	Belgrade
20:30	Scoring by quarter: 31–24, 24–19, 16–26, 22–18
	Pts: Brown 24; Rebs: T. Jones 8 Asts: C. Jones 4 PIR: T. Jones 28	Boxscore	Pts: Cordinier 24; Rebs: Weiler-Babb 6 Asts: Weiler-Babb 5 PIR: Cordinier 30	Arena: Belgrade Arena; Referees: Emilio Pérez, Saulius Račys, Amit Balak

9 October 2025	EA7 Emporio Armani Milan (Italian Basketball Federation)	79–82	(French Federation of Basketball) Monaco	Assago
20:30	Scoring by quarter: 17–22, 19–19, 26–25, 17–16
	Pts: Booker 15; Rebs: Brooks, Booker 8 Asts: Brown 7 PIR: Booker 27	Boxscore	Pts: James 18; Rebs: Theis 10; Asts: Nedović, Strazel 5 PIR: Theis 27	Arena: Unipol Forum; Attendance: 6,668; Referees: Robert Lottermoser, Milan Nedović, Stefan Ćalić

9 October 2025	Baskonia (Spanish Basketball Federation)	84–86	(Hellenic Basketball Federation) Panathinaikos AKTOR	Vitoria-Gasteiz
20:30	Scoring by quarter: 14–20, 22–22, 20–29, 28–15
	Pts: Luwawu-Cabarrot 16; Rebs: Sedekerskis 10; Asts: Forrest 6 PIR: four players 16	Boxscore	Pts: Nunn 30; Rebs: Hernangómez 10; Asts: Shorts 3 PIR: Nunn 24	Arena: Buesa Arena; Attendance: 8,662; Referees: Damir Javor, Luka Kardum, Hüseyin Çelik

9 October 2025	Paris Basketball (French Federation of Basketball)	90–79	(Italian Basketball Federation) Virtus Bologna	Paris
20:45	Scoring by quarter: 24–24, 25–16, 23–20, 18–19
	Pts: Hifi 20; Rebs: Bako 5 Asts: Hifi 6 PIR: Hifi 23	Boxscore	Pts: Morgan 21; Rebs: Niang 8 Asts: Vildoza 6 PIR: Morgan 15	Arena: Adidas Arena; Attendance: 6,525; Referees: Tomislav Hordov, Seffi Shemmesh, Adar Peer

9 October 2025	Real Madrid (Spanish Basketball Federation)	85–72	(French Federation of Basketball) LDLC ASVEL	Madrid
21:00	Scoring by quarter: 27–19, 21–18, 18–16, 19–19
	Pts: Okeke 17; Rebs: Fernando, Lyles 6 Asts: Feliz 6 PIR: Okeke 25	Boxscore	Pts: Jackson 16; Rebs: Traoré 8 Asts: Ngouama 3 PIR: Massa 17	Arena: Movistar Arena; Attendance: 7,165; Referees: Saša Pukl, Rain Peerandi, Vassilis Pitsilkas

10 October 2025	Fenerbahçe Beko (Turkish Basketball Federation)	81–86	(Basketball Federation of Serbia) Crvena zvezda Meridianbet	Istanbul
19:45	Scoring by quarter: 17–25, 13–18, 18–13, 33–30
	Pts: Colson, Horton-Tucker 19; Rebs: Melli 6 Asts: Baldwin 8 PIR: Horton-Tucker 22	Boxscore	Pts: Moneke 20; Rebs: Moneke 12; Asts: Miller-McIntyre 7 PIR: Moneke 31	Arena: Ülker Sports and Event Hall; Attendance: 12,213; Referees: Miguel Ángel Pérez, Gytis Vilius, Hugues Thépénier

10 October 2025	Olympiacos (Hellenic Basketball Federation)	86–67	(United Arab Emirates Basketball Association) Dubai Basketball	Piraeus
20:15	Scoring by quarter: 23–16, 20–15, 28–21, 15–15
	Pts: Vezenkov 25; Rebs: Milutinov, Vezenkov 11; Asts: Papanikolaou 4 PIR: Vezenkov 34	Boxscore	Pts: Petrušev 14; Rebs: Bacon 6 Asts: Wright 6 PIR: Petrušev 12	Arena: Peace and Friendship Stadium; Attendance: 11,676; Referees: Sreten Radović, Carlos Cortés, Gentian Cici

10 October 2025	Bayern Munich (German Basketball Federation)	70–98	(Lithuanian Basketball Federation) Žalgiris	Munich
20:30	Scoring by quarter: 20–26, 13–19, 24–23, 13–30
	Pts: Obst 15; Rebs: da Silva 4 Asts: Obst 4 PIR: Obst 18	Boxscore	Pts: Francisco 19; Rebs: Sleva 7 Asts: Francisco 7 PIR: Francisco 27	Arena: SAP Garden; Attendance: 11,500; Referees: Carlos Peruga, Jordi Aliaga, Josip Radojković

10 October 2025	Barcelona (Spanish Basketball Federation)	108–102	(Spanish Basketball Federation) Valencia Basket	Barcelona
20:30	Scoring by quarter: 26–25, 22–24, 30–26, 30–27
	Pts: Punter 27; Rebs: Hernangómez 6 Asts: Satoranský, Punter 7 PIR: Punter 31	Boxscore	Pts: Moore 21; Rebs: Moore, Costello 4 Asts: de Larrea 8 PIR: Moore 27	Arena: Palau Blaugrana; Attendance: 5,363; Referees: Borys Ryzhyk, Oļegs Latiševs, Mario Majkić

=== Round 4 ===
14 October 2025	Maccabi Rapyd Tel Aviv (Israeli Basketball Association)	71–92	(Spanish Basketball Federation) Barcelona	Belgrade
19:00	Scoring by quarter: 18–31, 14–29, 16–13, 23–19
	Pts: Santos 18; Rebs: Leaf 8 Asts: Clark 5 PIR: Santos 19	Boxscore	Pts: Hernangómez 19; Rebs: Hernangómez 7 Asts: Shengelia 8 PIR: Hernangómez 27	Arena: Aleksandar Nikolić Hall; Attendance: 400; Referees: Tomislav Hordov, Luka Kardum, Steve Bittner

14 October 2025	Fenerbahçe Beko (Turkish Basketball Federation)	69–93	(United Arab Emirates Basketball Association) Dubai Basketball	Istanbul
19:45	Scoring by quarter: 20–25, 11–21, 17–25, 21–22
	Pts: Colson, Baldwin 12; Rebs: Jantunen, Hall 6 Asts: Baldwin 5 PIR: Hall 17	Boxscore	Pts: Kabengele 26; Rebs: Petrušev 8 Asts: Prepelič, Wright 6 PIR: Kabengele 31	Arena: Ülker Sports and Event Hall; Attendance: 7,314; Referees: Mehdi Difallah, Rain Peerandi, Thomas Bissuel

14 October 2025	Crvena zvezda Meridianbet (Basketball Federation of Serbia)	88–79	(Lithuanian Basketball Federation) Žalgiris	Belgrade
20:00	Scoring by quarter: 23–27, 22–12, 12–19, 31–21
	Pts: Nwora 24; Rebs: Nwora 7 Asts: Yago, Miller-McIntyre 6 PIR: Nwora 34	Boxscore	Pts: Lô, Butkevičius 14; Rebs: Williams-Goss 6 Asts: Francisco 7 PIR: Francisco, Butkevičius 17	Arena: Belgrade Arena; Attendance: 18,271; Referees: Juan Carlos García, Kristaps Konstantinovs, Guido Giovannetti

14 October 2025	Olympiacos (Hellenic Basketball Federation)	78–82	(Turkish Basketball Federation) Anadolu Efes	Piraeus
20:15	Scoring by quarter: 25–28, 26–20, 16–19, 11–15
	Pts: Peters 14; Rebs: Vezenkov 7 Asts: Ward 7 PIR: Vezenkov 19	Boxscore	Pts: Swider 20; Rebs: Cordinier, Jones 7 Asts: Dozier, Larkin 3 PIR: Swider 20	Arena: Peace and Friendship Stadium; Attendance: 10,540; Referees: Oļegs Latiševs, Jakub Zamojski, Maxime Boubert

14 October 2025	Bayern Munich (German Basketball Federation)	64–53	(Italian Basketball Federation) EA7 Emporio Armani Milan	Munich
20:30	Scoring by quarter: 16–14, 12–19, 18–7, 18–13
	Pts: Lučić 15; Rebs: three players 5 Asts: Baldwin 3 PIR: Lučić 24	Boxscore	Pts: Booker 11; Rebs: Booker 12; Asts: Brown 4 PIR: Booker 27	Arena: SAP Garden; Attendance: 11,500; Referees: Miguel Ángel Pérez, Joseph Bissang, Leandro Lezcano

15 October 2025	Panathinaikos AKTOR (Hellenic Basketball Federation)	91–85	(French Federation of Basketball) LDLC ASVEL	Marousi
20:15	Scoring by quarter: 26–19, 22–20, 20–21, 23–25
	Pts: Nunn 26; Rebs: Holmes 10; Asts: Nunn 6 PIR: Holmes 33	Boxscore	Pts: de Colo 18; Rebs: three players 3 Asts: de Colo 7 PIR: de Colo 23	Arena: Telekom Center Athens; Attendance: 17,010; Referees: Carlos Peruga, Piotr Pastusiak, Christian Theis

15 October 2025	Virtus Bologna (Italian Basketball Federation)	77–73	(French Federation of Basketball) Monaco	Bologna
20:30	Scoring by quarter: 19–19, 18–15, 22–19, 18–20
	Pts: Edwards 24; Rebs: three players 6 Asts: Pajola 5 PIR: Edwards 27	Boxscore	Pts: Mirotić 16; Rebs: Mirotić, Theis 6 Asts: James 7 PIR: Mirotić 20	Arena: PalaDozza; Attendance: 5,471; Referees: Emilio Pérez, Robert Vyklický, Uroš Obrknežević

15 October 2025	Valencia Basket (Spanish Basketball Federation)	93–100	(Israeli Basketball Association) Hapoel IBI Tel Aviv	Valencia
20:30	Scoring by quarter: 18–27, 29–22, 23–31, 23–20
	Pts: Moore 22; Rebs: Thompson 6 Asts: Thompson 8 PIR: Moore 23	Boxscore	Pts: Micić 24; Rebs: Bryant 6 Asts: Jones 8 PIR: Micić 28	Arena: Roig Arena; Attendance: 0 (Note: The game was played behind closed doors for security reasons.); Referees: Robert Lottermoser, Milivoje Jovčić, Anne Panther

15 October 2025	Real Madrid (Spanish Basketball Federation)	93–86	(Basketball Federation of Serbia) Partizan Mozzart Bet	Madrid
20:45	Scoring by quarter: 24–12, 28–21, 23–23, 18–30
	Pts: Tavares 19; Rebs: Tavares 8 Asts: Campazzo 6 PIR: Tavares 27	Boxscore	Pts: Parker 23; Rebs: Osetkowski 6 Asts: Brown 3 PIR: Osetkowski 20	Arena: Movistar Arena; Attendance: 8,467; Referees: Emin Moğulkoç, Borys Ryzhyk, Ioannis Foufis

15 October 2025	Paris Basketball (French Federation of Basketball)	105–87	(Spanish Basketball Federation) Baskonia	Paris
20:45	Scoring by quarter: 30–21, 21–26, 28–24, 26–16
	Pts: Hifi 29; Rebs: Willis 12; Asts: Hifi 5 PIR: Hifi 32	Boxscore	Pts: Luwawu-Cabarrot 20; Rebs: three players 5 Asts: Nowell, Spagnolo 5 PIR: Nowell 22	Arena: Adidas Arena; Attendance: 4,976; Referees: Sreten Radović, Miloš Koljenšić, Denis Hadžić

=== Round 5 ===
16 October 2025	Dubai Basketball (United Arab Emirates Basketball Association)	83–78	(Spanish Basketball Federation) Barcelona	Dubai
18:00	Scoring by quarter: 24–15, 9–19, 25–22, 25–22
	Pts: Petrušev 23; Rebs: Kabengele 13; Asts: Wright 6 PIR: Petrušev 28	Boxscore	Pts: Shengelia, Brizuela 19; Rebs: Parra 8 Asts: Marcos 5 PIR: Shengelia 16	Arena: Coca-Cola Arena; Attendance: 6,309; Referees: Ilija Belošević, Uroš Nikolić, Michele Rossi

16 October 2025	Žalgiris (Lithuanian Basketball Federation)	78–89	(Italian Basketball Federation) EA7 Emporio Armani Milan	Kaunas
19:00	Scoring by quarter: 21–13, 21–26, 19–24, 17–26
	Pts: Butkevičius 20; Rebs: Wright 7 Asts: Francisco, Lô 6 PIR: Butkevičius 28	Boxscore	Pts: four players 15; Rebs: three players 7 Asts: Shields, Mannion 5 PIR: Gudurić 21	Arena: Žalgirio Arena; Attendance: 14,920; Referees: Damir Javor, Oļegs Latiševs, Alberto Baena

16 October 2025	Fenerbahçe Beko (Turkish Basketball Federation)	88–73	(German Basketball Federation) Bayern Munich	Istanbul
19:45	Scoring by quarter: 14–20, 23–12, 25–14, 26–27
	Pts: Jantunen 15; Rebs: Birch, Hall 5 Asts: Žagars 4 PIR: W. Baldwin 16	Boxscore	Pts: three players 13; Rebs: Gabriel 4 Asts: K. Baldwin 7 PIR: K. Baldwin 19	Arena: Ülker Sports and Event Hall; Attendance: 8,650; Referees: Milan Nedović, Carlos Cortés, Sergio Manuel

16 October 2025	Maccabi Rapyd Tel Aviv (Israeli Basketball Association)	94–95	(Hellenic Basketball Federation) Olympiacos	Belgrade
21:00	Scoring by quarter: 24–22, 24–18, 22–25, 24–30
	Pts: Dowtin 24; Rebs: Hoard 10; Asts: Blatt, Walker 3 PIR: Dowtin 27	Boxscore	Pts: Vezenkov, Milutinov 23; Rebs: Vezenkov 10; Asts: Ward 8 PIR: Vezenkov 31	Arena: Aleksandar Nikolić Hall; Attendance: 620; Referees: Juan Carlos García, Jordi Aliaga, Sašo Petek

17 October 2025	Crvena zvezda Meridianbet (Basketball Federation of Serbia)	90–75	(Spanish Basketball Federation) Real Madrid	Belgrade
19:00	Scoring by quarter: 20–25, 23–14, 24–14, 23–22
	Pts: Nwora, Miller-McIntyre 18; Rebs: Miller-McIntyre 8 Asts: Miller-McIntyre 8 PIR: Miller-McIntyre 22	Boxscore	Pts: Okeke 16; Rebs: Okeke 8 Asts: Okeke, Maledon 3 PIR: Okeke 25	Arena: Belgrade Arena; Attendance: 20,293; Referees: Mehdi Difallah, Jakub Zamojski, Saulius Račys

17 October 2025	Monaco (French Federation of Basketball)	90–84	(Spanish Basketball Federation) Valencia Basket	Fontvieille
19:30	Scoring by quarter: 27–22, 30–15, 14–25, 19–22
	Pts: Diallo 16; Rebs: Blossomgame 7 Asts: James 8 PIR: Mirotić 18	Boxscore	Pts: Badio 18; Rebs: Reuvers 10; Asts: Thompson 6 PIR: Reuvers 20	Arena: Salle Gaston Médecin; Attendance: 4,177; Referees: Tomislav Hordov, Seffi Shemmesh, Marcin Kowalski

17 October 2025	Anadolu Efes (Turkish Basketball Federation)	81–95	(Hellenic Basketball Federation) Panathinaikos AKTOR	Istanbul
19:30	Scoring by quarter: 21–22, 21–21, 10–26, 29–26
	Pts: Larkin 18; Rebs: Jones 6 Asts: Weiler-Babb, Larkin 5 PIR: Larkin 21	Boxscore	Pts: Osman 29; Rebs: Holmes 7 Asts: Sloukas 12; PIR: Osman 30	Arena: Basketball Development Center; Attendance: 9,873; Referees: Miguel Ángel Pérez, Artūras Šukys, Eduard Udyanskyy

17 October 2025	LDLC ASVEL (French Federation of Basketball)	83–90	(Italian Basketball Federation) Virtus Bologna	Villeurbanne
20:00	Scoring by quarter: 24–21, 18–19, 22–21, 19–29
	Pts: Watson 24; Rebs: Ndiaye 7 Asts: Vautier 3 PIR: Watson 22	Boxscore	Pts: Edwards 36; Rebs: Jallow 8 Asts: Vildoza 7 PIR: Edwards 28	Arena: Astroballe; Attendance: 5,361; Referees: Sreten Radović, Tomasz Trawicki, Dragan Porobić

17 October 2025	Paris Basketball (French Federation of Basketball)	88–89	(Israeli Basketball Association) Hapoel IBI Tel Aviv	Paris
20:45	Scoring by quarter: 25–26, 19–19, 26–21, 18–23
	Pts: Hifi 23; Rebs: Faye 10; Asts: Hifi 5 PIR: Willis 17	Boxscore	Pts: Oturu 18; Rebs: Oturu 9 Asts: Malcolm 5 PIR: Oturu 29	Arena: Adidas Arena; Attendance: 3,352; Referees: Emin Moğulkoç, Sérgio Silva, Igor Dragojević

17 October 2025	Baskonia (Spanish Basketball Federation)	79–91	(Basketball Federation of Serbia) Partizan Mozzart Bet	Vitoria-Gasteiz
20:45	Scoring by quarter: 20–22, 20–26, 24–18, 15–25
	Pts: Diallo 20; Rebs: Sedekerskis 5 Asts: Nowell 7 PIR: Diallo 24	Boxscore	Pts: Jones 18; Rebs: Parker 9 Asts: Jones 10; PIR: Jones 23	Arena: Buesa Arena; Attendance: 8,724; Referees: Saša Pukl, Gytis Vilius, Vasiliki Tsaroucha

=== Round 6 ===
22 October 2025	Maccabi Rapyd Tel Aviv (Israeli Basketball Association)	92–91	(Spanish Basketball Federation) Real Madrid	Belgrade
20:05	Scoring by quarter: 17–27, 40–21, 19–26, 16–17
	Pts: Walker 27; Rebs: Sorkin 6 Asts: Blatt 9 PIR: Sorkin 30	Boxscore	Pts: Hezonja 24; Rebs: Lyles 10; Asts: Campazzo 5 PIR: Lyles 29	Arena: Aleksandar Nikolić Hall; Attendance: 526; Referees: Damir Javor, Milan Nedović, Uroš Obrknežević

23 October 2025	LDLC ASVEL (French Federation of Basketball)	85–79	(United Arab Emirates Basketball Association) Dubai Basketball	Décines-Charpieu
19:30	Scoring by quarter: 21–24, 23–20, 15–24, 26–11
	Pts: de Colo 24; Rebs: Ndiaye 8 Asts: Watson, de Colo 5 PIR: de Colo 27	Boxscore	Pts: Bacon 22; Rebs: Petrušev 10; Asts: Wright 6 PIR: Petrušev 22	Arena: LDLC Arena; Attendance: 8,185; Referees: Emin Moğulkoç, Luka Kardum, Vasiliki Tsaroucha

23 October 2025	Hapoel IBI Tel Aviv (Israeli Basketball Association)	85–77	(French Federation of Basketball) Monaco	Sofia
20:05	Scoring by quarter: 27–18, 17–16, 18–29, 23–14
	Pts: Micić 22; Rebs: Bryant 8 Asts: Bryant 7 PIR: Micić 23	Boxscore	Pts: James 20; Rebs: Theis 8 Asts: Okobo 8 PIR: James 22	Arena: Arena 8888 Sofia; Attendance: 3,285; Referees: Carlos Peruga, Piotr Pastusiak, Rain Peerandi

23 October 2025	Barcelona (Spanish Basketball Federation)	73–88	(Lithuanian Basketball Federation) Žalgiris	Barcelona
20:30	Scoring by quarter: 14–26, 25–26, 15–23, 19–13
	Pts: Parra 17; Rebs: Veselý 7 Asts: Shengelia 3 PIR: Parra 20	Boxscore	Pts: Lô 20; Rebs: Wright 7 Asts: Lô 5 PIR: Lô 21	Arena: Palau Blaugrana; Attendance: 4,125; Referees: Sreten Radović, Jakub Zamojski, Maxime Boubert

23 October 2025	EA7 Emporio Armani Milan (Italian Basketball Federation)	100–103	(Spanish Basketball Federation) Valencia Basket	Assago
20:30	Scoring by quarter: 18–24, 30–30, 26–31, 26–18
	Pts: Bolmaro 31; Rebs: Brooks 6 Asts: Shields 7 PIR: Bolmaro 37	Boxscore	Pts: Montero 18; Rebs: Taylor 5 Asts: three players 3 PIR: Montero, Pradilla 17	Arena: Unipol Forum; Attendance: 6,545; Referees: Ilija Belošević, Gytis Vilius, Sérgio Silva

23 October 2025	Crvena zvezda Meridianbet (Basketball Federation of Serbia)	90–72	(Spanish Basketball Federation) Baskonia	Belgrade
21:00	Scoring by quarter: 21–20, 19–23, 32–15, 18–14
	Pts: Miller-McIntyre 20; Rebs: Moneke 8 Asts: Nwora 6 PIR: Nwora 26	Boxscore	Pts: Luwawu-Cabarrot 24; Rebs: Diakite, Sedekerskis 6 Asts: Nowell 5 PIR: Luwawu-Cabarrot 23	Arena: Belgrade Arena; Attendance: 19,795; Referees: Robert Lottermoser, Oļegs Latiševs, Steve Bittner

24 October 2025	Anadolu Efes (Turkish Basketball Federation)	69–79	(Turkish Basketball Federation) Fenerbahçe Beko	Istanbul
19:30	Scoring by quarter: 24–18, 19–26, 15–14, 11–21
	Pts: Weiler-Babb 17; Rebs: Šmits 5 Asts: Larkin 9 PIR: Larkin 19	Boxscore	Pts: Hall, Wilbekin 12; Rebs: Baldwin 7 Asts: Baldwin 8 PIR: Hall, Baldwin 15	Arena: Basketball Development Center; Attendance: 8,672; Referees: Juan Carlos García, Miloš Koljenšić, Alberto Baena

24 October 2025	Virtus Bologna (Italian Basketball Federation)	92–75	(Hellenic Basketball Federation) Panathinaikos AKTOR	Bologna
20:00	Scoring by quarter: 19–15, 29–20, 21–18, 23–22
	Pts: Edwards 22; Rebs: Pajola 10; Asts: Pajola 7 PIR: Pajola 21	Boxscore	Pts: Nunn 19; Rebs: four players 4 Asts: Sloukas 3 PIR: Shorts 17	Arena: PalaDozza; Attendance: 5,471; Referees: Saša Pukl, Jordi Aliaga, Hugues Thépénier

24 October 2025	Partizan Mozzart Bet (Basketball Federation of Serbia)	83–101	(French Federation of Basketball) Paris Basketball	Belgrade
20:30	Scoring by quarter: 26–26, 20–22, 14–23, 23–30
	Pts: Brown 25; Rebs: Bonga 9 Asts: Washington 5 PIR: Bonga 27	Boxscore	Pts: Hifi 21; Rebs: Faye 7 Asts: three players 4 PIR: Hifi 29	Arena: Belgrade Arena; Attendance: 20,024; Referees: Miguel Ángel Pérez, Artūras Šukys, Tomasz Trawicki

24 October 2025	Bayern Munich (German Basketball Federation)	71–96	(Hellenic Basketball Federation) Olympiacos	Munich
20:45	Scoring by quarter: 15–23, 14–24, 23–22, 19–27
	Pts: Obst 15; Rebs: da Silva 7 Asts: Jović 4 PIR: Obst, da Silva 14	Boxscore	Pts: Dorsey 19; Rebs: Hall 8 Asts: Walkup 8 PIR: Hall 25	Arena: SAP Garden; Attendance: 11,500; Referees: Mehdi Difallah, Emilio Pérez, Thomas Bissuel

=== Round 7 ===
28 October 2025	Žalgiris (Lithuanian Basketball Federation)	86–65	(Italian Basketball Federation) Virtus Bologna	Kaunas
19:00	Scoring by quarter: 25–11, 17–22, 16–17, 28–15
	Pts: Francisco 23; Rebs: Wright 8 Asts: Francisco 10; PIR: Francisco 35	Boxscore	Pts: Morgan 19; Rebs: Jallow 9 Asts: Pajola 5 PIR: Smailagić 20	Arena: Žalgirio Arena; Attendance: 14,512; Referees: Carlos Peruga, Piotr Pastusiak, Sérgio Silva

28 October 2025	Crvena zvezda Meridianbet (Basketball Federation of Serbia)	79–65	(French Federation of Basketball) LDLC ASVEL	Belgrade
19:00	Scoring by quarter: 21–17, 18–8, 23–15, 17–25
	Pts: Moneke 24; Rebs: Moneke 7 Asts: Miller-McIntyre, Yago 7 PIR: Moneke 35	Boxscore	Pts: Ajinça 13; Rebs: Massa, Traoré 4 Asts: Atamna 5 PIR: Ndiaye 16	Arena: Belgrade Arena; Attendance: 16,872; Referees: Emilio Pérez, Seffi Shemmesh, Marcin Kowalski

28 October 2025	Bayern Munich (German Basketball Federation)	90–84	(Spanish Basketball Federation) Real Madrid	Munich
20:00	Scoring by quarter: 27–25, 17–32, 25–10, 21–17
	Pts: Mike 29; Rebs: da Silva 10; Asts: Jović 6 PIR: Mike 30	Boxscore	Pts: Lyles 20; Rebs: Tavares 7 Asts: Maledon 4 PIR: Tavares 24	Arena: SAP Garden; Attendance: 11,500; Referees: Ilija Belošević, Igor Dragojević, Gytis Vilius

28 October 2025	Panathinaikos AKTOR (Hellenic Basketball Federation)	99–85	(Israeli Basketball Association) Maccabi Rapyd Tel Aviv	Marousi
20:15	Scoring by quarter: 24–25, 23–24, 21–17, 31–19
	Pts: Nunn 22; Rebs: Yurtseven 13; Asts: Shorts, Sloukas 6 PIR: Yurtseven 26	Boxscore	Pts: Hoard 15; Rebs: Hoard, Leaf 9 Asts: Blatt 6 PIR: Leaf 24	Arena: Telekom Center Athens; Attendance: 18,540; Referees: Sreten Radović, Oļegs Latiševs, Carlos Cortés

28 October 2025	Barcelona (Spanish Basketball Federation)	74–72	(Italian Basketball Federation) EA7 Emporio Armani Milan	Barcelona
20:30	Scoring by quarter: 14–19, 22–22, 28–20, 10–11
	Pts: Clyburn 17; Rebs: three players 5 Asts: Satoranský 7 PIR: Clyburn, Satoranský 16	Boxscore	Pts: Brooks 15; Rebs: Ricci 5 Asts: Bolmaro 4 PIR: Brooks 16	Arena: Palau Blaugrana; Attendance: 5,561; Referees: Mehdi Difallah, Borys Ryzhyk, Thomas Bissuel

28 October 2025	Baskonia (Spanish Basketball Federation)	92–85	(United Arab Emirates Basketball Association) Dubai Basketball	Vitoria-Gasteiz
20:30	Scoring by quarter: 26–20, 15–22, 23–18, 28–25
	Pts: Luwawu-Cabarrot 25; Rebs: Diallo 8 Asts: Simmons, Spagnolo 5 PIR: Luwawu-Cabarrot 23	Boxscore	Pts: Petrušev 22; Rebs: Petrušev 7 Asts: Wright 5 PIR: Petrušev 34	Arena: Buesa Arena; Attendance: 7,621; Referees: Tomislav Hordov, Ioannis Foufis, Tomasz Trawicki

28 October 2025	Paris Basketball (French Federation of Basketball)	80–90	(Turkish Basketball Federation) Anadolu Efes	Paris
20:45	Scoring by quarter: 21–17, 18–29, 21–23, 20–21
	Pts: Hifi, Herrera 17; Rebs: Willis 7 Asts: Hifi, Robinson 5 PIR: Herrera 17	Boxscore	Pts: Larkin 19; Rebs: Osmani 6 Asts: Weiler-Babb 5 PIR: Osmani 21	Arena: Adidas Arena; Attendance: 8,202; Referees: Damir Javor, Luka Kardum, Anne Panther

28 October 2025	Valencia Basket (Spanish Basketball Federation)	94–79	(Turkish Basketball Federation) Fenerbahçe Beko	Valencia
21:00	Scoring by quarter: 27–13, 24–22, 25–21, 18–23
	Pts: Taylor 17; Rebs: Taylor 6 Asts: Montero 5 PIR: Taylor 20	Boxscore	Pts: Biberović 18; Rebs: Jantunen, Horton-Tucker 5 Asts: Baldwin 5 PIR: Baldwin, Horton-Tucker 22	Arena: Roig Arena; Attendance: 11,267; Referees: Saša Pukl, Artūras Šukys, Eduard Udyanskyy

29 October 2025	Hapoel IBI Tel Aviv (Israeli Basketball Association)	97–84	(Basketball Federation of Serbia) Partizan Mozzart Bet	Sofia
19:00	Scoring by quarter: 25–19, 18–23, 27–21, 27–21
	Pts: Malcolm 17; Rebs: Bryant 9 Asts: Micić, Malcolm 4 PIR: Malcolm 27	Boxscore	Pts: Brown 19; Rebs: Jones 10; Asts: Washington 6 PIR: Jones 20	Arena: Arena 8888 Sofia; Attendance: 7,647; Referees: Juan Carlos García, Jakub Zamojski, Sergio Manuel

29 October 2025	Olympiacos (Hellenic Basketball Federation)	87–92	(French Federation of Basketball) Monaco	Piraeus
20:15	Scoring by quarter: 20–16, 18–21, 22–27, 27–28
	Pts: Dorsey 23; Rebs: Milutinov 8 Asts: Dorsey 5 PIR: Dorsey 26	Boxscore	Pts: Diallo 27; Rebs: Theis 7 Asts: James 10; PIR: Diallo 32	Arena: Peace and Friendship Stadium; Attendance: 12,607; Referees: Milivoje Jovčić, Saulius Račys, Alberto Baena

=== Round 8 ===
30 October 2025	Žalgiris (Lithuanian Basketball Federation)	96–59	(French Federation of Basketball) LDLC ASVEL	Kaunas
19:00	Scoring by quarter: 26–15, 22–20, 25–9, 23–15
	Pts: Francisco 15; Rebs: Wright 7 Asts: Francisco 7 PIR: Francisco 22	Boxscore	Pts: Watson 14; Rebs: Massa 7 Asts: Seljaas, Atamna 3 PIR: Seljaas 8	Arena: Žalgirio Arena; Attendance: 14,790; Referees: Ilija Belošević, Miloš Koljenšić, Robert Vyklický

30 October 2025	Maccabi Rapyd Tel Aviv (Israeli Basketball Association)	92–99	(Basketball Federation of Serbia) Crvena zvezda Meridianbet	Belgrade
20:05	Scoring by quarter: 26–33, 22–25, 23–19, 21–22
	Pts: Hoard 20; Rebs: Leaf, Hoard 6 Asts: three players 4 PIR: Walker 17	Boxscore	Pts: Miller-McIntyre 23; Rebs: Moneke 8 Asts: Miller-McIntyre 12; PIR: Miller-McIntyre 26	Arena: Aleksandar Nikolić Hall; Attendance: 778; Referees: Miguel Ángel Pérez, Gytis Vilius, Sérgio Silva

30 October 2025	Valencia Basket (Spanish Basketball Federation)	80–78	(United Arab Emirates Basketball Association) Dubai Basketball	Valencia
20:30	Scoring by quarter: 23–20, 15–21, 22–23, 20–14
	Pts: Taylor 19; Rebs: Sako 8 Asts: Montero 7 PIR: Taylor 24	Boxscore	Pts: Ellis 18; Rebs: Kabengele 8 Asts: Wright 6 PIR: Petrušev 24	Arena: Roig Arena; Attendance: 10,462; Referees: Borys Ryzhyk, Igor Dragojević, Josip Radojković

30 October 2025	Bayern Munich (German Basketball Federation)	86–70	(Italian Basketball Federation) Virtus Bologna	Munich
20:30	Scoring by quarter: 18–15, 23–23, 20–17, 25–15
	Pts: Obst 21; Rebs: Voigtmann 6 Asts: Jović 8 PIR: Mike 24	Boxscore	Pts: Smailagić 17; Rebs: Jallow 9 Asts: Vildoza 5 PIR: Smailagić, Jallow 17	Arena: SAP Garden; Attendance: 11,500; Referees: Damir Javor, Joseph Bissang, Vasiliki Tsaroucha

30 October 2025	EA7 Emporio Armani Milan (Italian Basketball Federation)	86–77	(French Federation of Basketball) Paris Basketball	Assago
20:30	Scoring by quarter: 23–15, 24–12, 20–26, 19–24
	Pts: Booker 13; Rebs: Ricci 10; Asts: Ellis 8 PIR: Booker 22	Boxscore	Pts: Hifi 24; Rebs: Hifi 6 Asts: Robinson 3 PIR: Hifi 18	Arena: Unipol Forum; Attendance: 7,005; Referees: Carlos Peruga, Jordi Aliaga, Rain Peerandi

30 October 2025	Real Madrid (Spanish Basketball Federation)	84–58	(Turkish Basketball Federation) Fenerbahçe Beko	Madrid
21:00	Scoring by quarter: 25–16, 24–6, 15–13, 20–23
	Pts: Maledon 15; Rebs: Tavares 9 Asts: Campazzo 6 PIR: Maledon, Tavares 23	Boxscore	Pts: Baldwin 14; Rebs: Horton-Tucker 6 Asts: Baldwin 3 PIR: Colson 11	Arena: Movistar Arena; Attendance: 9,076; Referees: Tomislav Hordov, Oļegs Latiševs, Sašo Petek

31 October 2025	Monaco (French Federation of Basketball)	92–84	(Hellenic Basketball Federation) Panathinaikos AKTOR	Fontvieille
19:00	Scoring by quarter: 27–20, 23–21, 18–17, 24–26
	Pts: Okobo 15; Rebs: Theis 6 Asts: James 8 PIR: Okobo, James 17	Boxscore	Pts: Nunn 26; Rebs: Osman 8 Asts: Grant 4 PIR: Nunn 24	Arena: Salle Gaston Médecin; Attendance: 5,000; Referees: Emilio Pérez, Luka Kardum, Steve Bittner

31 October 2025	Olympiacos (Hellenic Basketball Federation)	62–58	(Israeli Basketball Association) Hapoel IBI Tel Aviv	Piraeus
20:15	Scoring by quarter: 18–21, 15–18, 11–4, 18–15
	Pts: Vezenkov 14; Rebs: Milutinov 13; Asts: Fournier, Walkup 5 PIR: Milutinov 25	Boxscore	Pts: Blakeney 13; Rebs: Bryant 8 Asts: Bryant, Micić 3 PIR: Malcolm 20	Arena: Peace and Friendship Stadium; Attendance: 12,277; Referees: Sreten Radović, Carlos Cortés, Artūras Šukys

31 October 2025	Partizan Mozzart Bet (Basketball Federation of Serbia)	76–78	(Spanish Basketball Federation) Barcelona	Belgrade
20:30	Scoring by quarter: 17–18, 24–15, 15–25, 20–20
	Pts: Washington 21; Rebs: Jones 13; Asts: Jones 7 PIR: Jones 29	Boxscore	Pts: Shengelia 24; Rebs: Shengelia, Satoranský 5 Asts: Shengelia 5 PIR: Shengelia 42	Arena: Belgrade Arena; Attendance: 20,003; Referees: Emin Moğulkoç, Seffi Shemmesh, Adar Peer

31 October 2025	Baskonia (Spanish Basketball Federation)	86–75	(Turkish Basketball Federation) Anadolu Efes	Vitoria-Gasteiz
20:30	Scoring by quarter: 22–11, 21–28, 22–19, 21–17
	Pts: Luwawu-Cabarrot 20; Rebs: Luwawu-Cabarrot 5 Asts: Spagnolo 6 PIR: Spagnolo 28	Boxscore	Pts: Larkin 23; Rebs: Osmani, Weiler-Babb 6 Asts: Osmani 7 PIR: Weiler-Babb 23	Arena: Buesa Arena; Attendance: 7,708; Referees: Mehdi Difallah, Kristaps Konstantinovs, Uroš Obrknežević

=== Round 9 ===
5 November 2025	Crvena zvezda Meridianbet (Basketball Federation of Serbia)	86–68	(Hellenic Basketball Federation) Panathinaikos AKTOR	Belgrade
20:00	Scoring by quarter: 20–12, 26–20, 21–8, 19–28
	Pts: Moneke, Miller-McIntyre 14; Rebs: Miller-McIntyre 9 Asts: Miller-McIntyre 7 PIR: Moneke 19	Boxscore	Pts: Sloukas 16; Rebs: Osman 5 Asts: Nunn 5 PIR: Sloukas 14	Arena: Belgrade Arena; Attendance: 20,787; Referees: Carlos Peruga, Jakub Zamojski, Saulius Račys

6 November 2025	Fenerbahçe Beko (Turkish Basketball Federation)	81–67	(French Federation of Basketball) LDLC ASVEL	Istanbul
18:45	Scoring by quarter: 18–10, 27–24, 14–14, 22–19
	Pts: Baldwin 14; Rebs: Melli 9 Asts: Baldwin 7 PIR: Baldwin 19	Boxscore	Pts: Traoré 18; Rebs: Traoré 5 Asts: Watson 5 PIR: Traoré 25	Arena: Ülker Sports and Event Hall; Attendance: 7,216; Referees: Milan Nedović, Carlos Cortés, Tomasz Trawicki

6 November 2025	Dubai Basketball (United Arab Emirates Basketball Association)	97–109	(Israeli Basketball Association) Hapoel IBI Tel Aviv	Sarajevo (Note: Dubai Basketball's home game against Hapoel Tel Aviv was relocated to Bosnia and Herzegovina on recommendation of both Emirati and Israeli governments regarding the Gaza war.)
19:00	Scoring by quarter: 26–25, 22–22, 19–35, 30–27
	Pts: Bacon 36; Rebs: Bacon 5 Asts: Kondić 5 PIR: Bacon 34	Boxscore	Pts: Bryant 25; Rebs: Malcolm 8 Asts: Micić 6 PIR: Bryant 36	Arena: Juan Antonio Samaranch Olympic Hall; Referees: Mehdi Difallah, Sérgio Silva, Dragan Porobić

6 November 2025	Baskonia (Spanish Basketball Federation)	87–76	(Italian Basketball Federation) Virtus Bologna	Vitoria-Gasteiz
20:30	Scoring by quarter: 23–14, 23–20, 19–23, 22–19
	Pts: Luwawu-Cabarrot 16; Rebs: Diallo, Diop 6 Asts: Simmons 8 PIR: Luwawu-Cabarrot 18	Boxscore	Pts: Niang 18; Rebs: Niang 12; Asts: Pajola 6 PIR: Niang 35	Arena: Buesa Arena; Attendance: 7,534; Referees: Emin Moğulkoç, Miloš Koljenšić, Maxime Boubert

6 November 2025	Paris Basketball (French Federation of Basketball)	82–86	(German Basketball Federation) Bayern Munich	Paris
21:00	Scoring by quarter: 19–22, 23–31, 26–11, 14–22
	Pts: Robinson 22; Rebs: Cavalière 7 Asts: Robinson 5 PIR: Robinson 22	Boxscore	Pts: Rathan-Mayes 16; Rebs: four players 5 Asts: Dinwiddie 5 PIR: Lučić 21	Arena: Adidas Arena; Attendance: 5,043; Referees: Juan Carlos García, Borys Ryzhyk, Alberto Baena

6 November 2025	Maccabi Rapyd Tel Aviv (Israeli Basketball Association)	107–112(OT)	(French Federation of Basketball) Monaco	Belgrade
21:00	Scoring by quarter: 26–22, 23–24, 27–25, 20–25, Overtime: 11–16
	Pts: Walker 19; Rebs: Hoard 10; Asts: Clark 8 PIR: Leaf 25	Boxscore	Pts: James 34; Rebs: Theis 9 Asts: James, Okobo 7 PIR: James 37	Arena: Aleksandar Nikolić Hall; Attendance: 212; Referees: Tomislav Hordov, Ioannis Foufis, Vasiliki Tsaroucha

7 November 2025	Anadolu Efes (Turkish Basketball Federation)	93–97(OT)	(Italian Basketball Federation) EA7 Emporio Armani Milan	Istanbul
18:30	Scoring by quarter: 16–16, 20–17, 12–26, 25–14, Overtime: 11–11, 9–13
	Pts: Dozier 34; Rebs: Osmani 7 Asts: Larkin 9 PIR: Dozier 34	Boxscore	Pts: LeDay 25; Rebs: Gudurić, Booker 8 Asts: Bolmaro 5 PIR: Shields 30	Arena: Turkcell Basketball Development Center; Attendance: 8,921; Referees: Miguel Ángel Pérez, Milivoje Jovčić, Marcin Kowalski

7 November 2025	Žalgiris (Lithuanian Basketball Federation)	86–77	(Spanish Basketball Federation) Valencia Basket	Kaunas
19:00	Scoring by quarter: 18–17, 20–18, 23–23, 25–19
	Pts: Francisco 15; Rebs: Wright 10; Asts: Francisco 7 PIR: three players 19	Boxscore	Pts: Pradilla, Montero 15; Rebs: Pradilla 5 Asts: Moore, de Larrea 4 PIR: Taylor 17	Arena: Žalgirio Arena; Attendance: 15,154; Referees: Damir Javor, Oļegs Latiševs, Thomas Bissuel

7 November 2025	Olympiacos (Hellenic Basketball Federation)	80–71	(Basketball Federation of Serbia) Partizan Mozzart Bet	Piraeus
20:15	Scoring by quarter: 20–20, 18–19, 15–19, 27–13
	Pts: Walkup 15; Rebs: Milutinov 10; Asts: Walkup 4 PIR: Milutinov 21	Boxscore	Pts: Washington 20; Rebs: Jones, Bonga 7 Asts: Milton 5 PIR: Jones 25	Arena: Peace and Friendship Stadium; Attendance: 12,750; Referees: Robert Lottermoser, Jordi Aliaga, Piotr Pastusiak

7 November 2025	Barcelona (Spanish Basketball Federation)	92–101	(Spanish Basketball Federation) Real Madrid	Barcelona
20:30	Scoring by quarter: 24–34, 24–24, 21–27, 23–16
	Pts: Clyburn 19; Rebs: Shengelia 6 Asts: Shengelia 7 PIR: Clyburn 23	Boxscore	Pts: Lyles 29; Rebs: Tavares 10; Asts: Maledon, Campazzo 5 PIR: Lyles 32	Arena: Palau Blaugrana; Attendance: 7,294; Referees: Sreten Radović, Artūras Šukys, Kristaps Konstantinovs

=== Round 10 ===
11 November 2025	Dubai Basketball (United Arab Emirates Basketball Association)	102–86	(Basketball Federation of Serbia) Crvena zvezda Meridianbet	Dubai
17:00	Scoring by quarter: 29–21, 22–26, 18–18, 33–21
	Pts: Kamenjaš 20; Rebs: Kamenjaš 9 Asts: Petrušev, Wright 6 PIR: Kamenjaš 29	Boxscore	Pts: Izundu 16; Rebs: three players 4 Asts: Yago, Miller-McIntyre 5 PIR: Izundu 20	Arena: Coca-Cola Arena; Attendance: 5,169; Referees: Juan Carlos García, Seffi Shemmesh, Vassilis Pitsilkas

11 November 2025	Fenerbahçe Beko (Turkish Basketball Federation)	84–75	(Israeli Basketball Association) Maccabi Rapyd Tel Aviv	Munich (Note: Fenerbahçe Beko's home games against Israeli teams (Maccabi and Hapoel) were relocated to Germany on recommendation of both Turkish and Israeli governments regarding the Gaza war.)
18:45	Scoring by quarter: 20–15, 20–15, 25–26, 19–19
	Pts: Baldwin 17; Rebs: Jantunen, Hall 6 Asts: Baldwin 4 PIR: Baldwin 16	Boxscore	Pts: Sorkin 22; Rebs: Hoard 10; Asts: Blatt 7 PIR: Sorkin 27	Arena: SAP Garden; Attendance: 2,541; Referees: Damir Javor, Saulius Račys, Leandro Lezcano

11 November 2025	Hapoel IBI Tel Aviv (Israeli Basketball Association)	114–89	(Spanish Basketball Federation) Baskonia	Sofia
20:05	Scoring by quarter: 26–24, 32–24, 28–26, 28–15
	Pts: Bryant 24; Rebs: Bryant 9 Asts: Bryant 4 PIR: Bryant 38	Boxscore	Pts: Luwawu-Cabarrot 19; Rebs: Sedekerskis, Spagnolo 3 Asts: Howard, Spagnolo 4 PIR: Luwawu-Cabarrot 19	Arena: Arena 8888 Sofia; Attendance: 2,920; Referees: Ilija Belošević, Thomas Bissuel, Gentian Cici

11 November 2025	Partizan Mozzart Bet (Basketball Federation of Serbia)	78–76	(French Federation of Basketball) Monaco	Belgrade
20:30	Scoring by quarter: 19–20, 17–12, 28–17, 14–27
	Pts: Washington 22; Rebs: Jones 8 Asts: Brown, Milton 4 PIR: Pokuševski 15	Boxscore	Pts: Mirotić 17; Rebs: Mirotić 8 Asts: James 5 PIR: Mirotić 17	Arena: Belgrade Arena; Attendance: 19,747; Referees: Carlos Peruga, Carlos Cortés, Robert Vyklický

11 November 2025	Virtus Bologna (Italian Basketball Federation)	99–89	(Turkish Basketball Federation) Anadolu Efes	Bologna
20:30	Scoring by quarter: 28–24, 20–21, 28–28, 23–16
	Pts: Edwards 21; Rebs: Diouf 6 Asts: Pajola, Vildoza 7 PIR: Vildoza 24	Boxscore	Pts: Larkin 25; Rebs: Osmani 6 Asts: Weiler-Babb 6 PIR: Larkin 30	Arena: PalaDozza; Attendance: 5,471; Referees: Milan Nedović, Alberto Baena, Ioannis Tiganis

11 November 2025	Valencia Basket (Spanish Basketball Federation)	89–76	(Spanish Basketball Federation) Real Madrid	Valencia
20:30	Scoring by quarter: 22–21, 23–17, 22–22, 22–16
	Pts: Moore 16; Rebs: Costello, Moore 5 Asts: Taylor 5 PIR: Moore 18	Boxscore	Pts: Lyles 23; Rebs: Lyles 9 Asts: Campazzo 7 PIR: Lyles 24	Arena: Roig Arena; Attendance: 14,922; Referees: Emin Moğulkoç, Milivoje Jovčić, Hugues Thépénier

11 November 2025	Paris Basketball (French Federation of Basketball)	95–101	(Hellenic Basketball Federation) Panathinaikos AKTOR	Paris
20:45	Scoring by quarter: 28–27, 15–25, 29–20, 23–29
	Pts: Robinson 22; Rebs: Cavalière, Faye 6 Asts: Robinson 4 PIR: Robinson 21	Boxscore	Pts: Nunn 20; Rebs: Faried 10; Asts: Sloukas 7 PIR: Mitoglou 28	Arena: Accor Arena; Attendance: 11,015; Referees: Miguel Ángel Pérez, Gytis Vilius, Arnau Padrós

12 November 2025	Olympiacos (Hellenic Basketball Federation)	95–78	(Lithuanian Basketball Federation) Žalgiris	Piraeus
20:15	Scoring by quarter: 28–14, 22–22, 24–17, 21–25
	Pts: Dorsey 30; Rebs: Hall 9 Asts: three players 4 PIR: Milutinov 29	Boxscore	Pts: Francisco 15; Rebs: Wright 10; Asts: Francisco, Ulanovas 3 PIR: Wright 18	Arena: Peace and Friendship Stadium; Attendance: 12,177; Referees: Tomislav Hordov, Jakub Zamojski, Tomasz Trawicki

12 November 2025	Bayern Munich (German Basketball Federation)	74–75	(Spanish Basketball Federation) Barcelona	Munich
20:30	Scoring by quarter: 15–20, 17–23, 25–18, 17–14
	Pts: Dinwiddie, da Silva 17; Rebs: da Silva 9 Asts: three players 3 PIR: da Silva 25	Boxscore	Pts: Satoranský 13; Rebs: Shengelia 5 Asts: Satoranský, Shengelia 4 PIR: Satoranský 22	Arena: SAP Garden; Attendance: 11,500; Referees: Oļegs Latiševs, Luka Kardum, Kerem Baki

12 November 2025	EA7 Emporio Armani Milan (Italian Basketball Federation)	80–72	(French Federation of Basketball) LDLC ASVEL	Assago
20:30	Scoring by quarter: 18–9, 22–23, 16–19, 24–21
	Pts: Brooks 23; Rebs: Bolmaro 8 Asts: Ellis 10; PIR: Brooks 20	Boxscore	Pts: Watson 25; Rebs: Massa, Seljaas 7 Asts: Watson 7 PIR: Watson 26	Arena: Unipol Forum; Attendance: 6,113; Referees: Sreten Radović, Artūras Šukys, Eduard Udyanskyy

=== Round 11 ===
13 November 2025	Fenerbahçe Beko (Turkish Basketball Federation)	74–68	(Israeli Basketball Association) Hapoel IBI Tel Aviv	Munich
20:00	Scoring by quarter: 13–13, 14–15, 27–16, 20–24
	Pts: Horton-Tucker 15; Rebs: Melli 10; Asts: Baldwin 3 PIR: Hall, Horton-Tucker 15	Boxscore	Pts: Bryant 19; Rebs: Oturu 9 Asts: Bryant, Micić 3 PIR: Bryant 28	Arena: SAP Garden; Attendance: 3,040; Referees: Carlos Peruga, Miloš Koljenšić, Mario Majkić

13 November 2025	Crvena zvezda Meridianbet (Basketball Federation of Serbia)	91–79	(French Federation of Basketball) Monaco	Belgrade
20:00	Scoring by quarter: 23–25, 19–21, 23–18, 26–15
	Pts: Dobrić 22; Rebs: Kalinić 7 Asts: Miller-McIntyre 10; PIR: Dobrić 26	Boxscore	Pts: James 18; Rebs: Blossomgame 7 Asts: James 7 PIR: James 20	Arena: Belgrade Arena; Attendance: 19,458; Referees: Emin Moğulkoç, Rain Peerandi, Kristaps Konstantinovs

13 November 2025	Real Madrid (Spanish Basketball Federation)	77–87	(Hellenic Basketball Federation) Panathinaikos AKTOR	Madrid
20:45	Scoring by quarter: 16–22, 22–30, 21–21, 18–14
	Pts: Tavares 20; Rebs: Tavares 10; Asts: Maledon 3 PIR: Tavares 30	Boxscore	Pts: Shorts 19; Rebs: Hernangómez 11; Asts: Sloukas 7 PIR: Shorts 24	Arena: Movistar Arena; Attendance: 10,176; Referees: Ilija Belošević, Joseph Bissang, Piotr Pastusiak

13 November 2025	Paris Basketball (French Federation of Basketball)	90–86	(Spanish Basketball Federation) Valencia Basket	Paris
20:45	Scoring by quarter: 15–14, 22–35, 30–22, 23–15
	Pts: Hifi 17; Rebs: Faye 6 Asts: three players 5 PIR: Willis 22	Boxscore	Pts: Thompson, Taylor 13; Rebs: Pradilla 7 Asts: Thompson, Montero 4 PIR: Thompson, Taylor 15	Arena: Adidas Arena; Attendance: 4,845; Referees: Milan Nedović, Ioannis Foufis, Nick Van den Broeck

13 November 2025	Maccabi Rapyd Tel Aviv (Israeli Basketball Association)	89–83	(Spanish Basketball Federation) Baskonia	Belgrade
21:00	Scoring by quarter: 25–18, 28–25, 18–25, 18–15
	Pts: Leaf 19; Rebs: Hoard 11; Asts: Sorkin 6 PIR: Leaf 26	Boxscore	Pts: Luwawu-Cabarrot 19; Rebs: Luwawu-Cabarrot 6 Asts: Luwawu-Cabarrot 5 PIR: Luwawu-Cabarrot 22	Arena: Aleksandar Nikolić Hall; Attendance: 100; Referees: Robert Lottermoser, Milivoje Jovčić, Hüseyin Çelik

14 November 2025	Dubai Basketball (United Arab Emirates Basketball Association)	95–89	(Lithuanian Basketball Federation) Žalgiris	Dubai
17:00	Scoring by quarter: 24–34, 21–14, 28–16, 22–25
	Pts: Kabengele 21; Rebs: Kabengele 10; Asts: Wright 9 PIR: Avramović 27	Boxscore	Pts: Tubelis 22; Rebs: Butkevičius 7 Asts: Francisco 9 PIR: Tubelis 24	Arena: Coca-Cola Arena; Attendance: 5,341; Referees: Saša Pukl, Michele Rossi, Marko Juras

14 November 2025	Anadolu Efes (Turkish Basketball Federation)	74–72	(German Basketball Federation) Bayern Munich	Antalya (Note: Anadolu Efes' home game against Bayern was relocated to Antalya as part of Anadolu Efes’ wider strategic initiative to expand the club’s reach beyond Istanbul.)
18:30	Scoring by quarter: 19–14, 23–20, 18–13, 14–25
	Pts: Cordinier 26; Rebs: three players 5 Asts: Weiler-Babb 8 PIR: Cordinier 29	Boxscore	Pts: Mike 15; Rebs: Lučić 7 Asts: Jović 5 PIR: Mike 16	Arena: Antalya Sports Hall; Attendance: 10,000; Referees: Jordi Aliaga, Igor Dragojević, Sergio Manuel

14 November 2025	LDLC ASVEL (French Federation of Basketball)	88–87	(Basketball Federation of Serbia) Partizan Mozzart Bet	Villeurbanne
20:00	Scoring by quarter: 26–20, 16–16, 24–27, 22–24
	Pts: Watson, Seljaas 18; Rebs: Massa 5 Asts: Watson 6 PIR: Seljaas 23	Boxscore	Pts: Brown 20; Rebs: Pokuševski 7 Asts: Brown, Calathes 4 PIR: Brown 22	Arena: Astroballe; Attendance: 5,560; Referees: Miguel Ángel Pérez, Guido Giovannetti, Noam Gordon

14 November 2025	Barcelona (Spanish Basketball Federation)	88–81	(Italian Basketball Federation) Virtus Bologna	Barcelona
20:30	Scoring by quarter: 20–19, 25–24, 16–24, 27–14
	Pts: Punter 17; Rebs: Shengelia 7 Asts: Satoranský 6 PIR: Veselý 16	Boxscore	Pts: Morgan 17; Rebs: three players 6 Asts: Pajola 5 PIR: Morgan 15	Arena: Palau Blaugrana; Attendance: 5,264; Referees: Borys Ryzhyk, Sérgio Silva, Amit Balak

14 November 2025	EA7 Emporio Armani Milan (Italian Basketball Federation)	88–87	(Hellenic Basketball Federation) Olympiacos	Assago
20:30	Scoring by quarter: 27–21, 20–22, 20–13, 21–31
	Pts: Ellis 16; Rebs: Bolmaro 8 Asts: Ellis 5 PIR: Ellis 22	Boxscore	Pts: Peters 27; Rebs: Vezenkov 7 Asts: Walkup 6 PIR: Dorsey 28	Arena: Unipol Forum; Attendance: 10,237; Referees: Mehdi Difallah, Emilio Pérez, Oļegs Latiševs

=== Round 12 ===
19 November 2025	LDLC ASVEL (French Federation of Basketball)	52–84	(French Federation of Basketball) Monaco	Décines-Charpieu
20:00	Scoring by quarter: 11–14, 10–20, 19–30, 12–20
	Pts: three players 7 Rebs: Massa 8 Asts: three players 2 PIR: Watson 9	Boxscore	Pts: James, Mirotić 12; Rebs: Blossomgame 10; Asts: James 7 PIR: Blossomgame 17	Arena: LDLC Arena; Attendance: 8,603; Referees: Oļegs Latiševs, Piotr Pastusiak, Michele Rossi

20 November 2025	Anadolu Efes (Turkish Basketball Federation)	74–73	(Spanish Basketball Federation) Barcelona	Istanbul
18:30	Scoring by quarter: 18–19, 17–27, 23–9, 16–18
	Pts: Cordinier 14; Rebs: Osmani, Weiler-Babb 6 Asts: Weiler-Babb 8 PIR: Osmani, Weiler-Babb 19	Boxscore	Pts: Veselý 16; Rebs: Veselý 8 Asts: Satoranský 5 PIR: Veselý 23	Arena: Turkcell Basketball Development Center; Attendance: 9,814; Referees: Ilija Belošević, Saulius Račys, Vassilis Pitsilkas

20 November 2025	Panathinaikos AKTOR (Hellenic Basketball Federation)	103–82	(United Arab Emirates Basketball Association) Dubai Basketball	Marousi
20:15	Scoring by quarter: 25–24, 20–24, 30–14, 28–20
	Pts: Nunn 22; Rebs: Hernangómez 6 Asts: Sloukas 5 PIR: Nunn 26	Boxscore	Pts: Kabengele 18; Rebs: Petrušev 6 Asts: Wright 9 PIR: Petrušev 20	Arena: Telekom Center Athens; Attendance: 18,913; Referees: Carlos Peruga, Rain Peerandi, Tomasz Trawicki

20 November 2025	EA7 Emporio Armani Milan (Italian Basketball Federation)	83–105	(Israeli Basketball Association) Hapoel IBI Tel Aviv	Assago
20:30	Scoring by quarter: 25–25, 20–24, 19–27, 19–29
	Pts: Bolmaro 16; Rebs: four players 4 Asts: Ellis 6 PIR: Bolmaro 20	Boxscore	Pts: Oturu, Blakeney 20; Rebs: Oturu 7 Asts: Jones 10; PIR: Bryant 23	Arena: Unipol Forum; Attendance: 7,779; Referees: Juan Carlos García, Carlos Cortés, Kristaps Konstantinovs

20 November 2025	Real Madrid (Spanish Basketball Federation)	100–99	(Lithuanian Basketball Federation) Žalgiris	Madrid
20:45	Scoring by quarter: 22–16, 21–21, 19–25, 38–37
	Pts: Maledon 25; Rebs: Tavares 11; Asts: Maledon 5 PIR: Maledon 34	Boxscore	Pts: Francisco 33; Rebs: Tubelis 5 Asts: Francisco 11; PIR: Francisco 37	Arena: Movistar Arena; Attendance: 9,152; Referees: Robert Lottermoser, Miloš Koljenšić, Marcin Kowalski

21 November 2025	Olympiacos (Hellenic Basketball Federation)	98–86	(French Federation of Basketball) Paris Basketball	Piraeus
20:15	Scoring by quarter: 21–29, 37–20, 17–20, 23–17
	Pts: Fournier 18; Rebs: Milutinov 9 Asts: Walkup 6 PIR: Milutinov 18	Boxscore	Pts: Robinson 35; Rebs: Faye 8 Asts: Morgan 5 PIR: Robinson 39	Arena: Peace and Friendship Stadium; Attendance: 12,750; Referees: Damir Javor, Luka Kardum, Eduard Udyanskyy

21 November 2025	Virtus Bologna (Italian Basketball Federation)	99–89	(Israeli Basketball Association) Maccabi Rapyd Tel Aviv	Bologna
20:30	Scoring by quarter: 26–24, 30–21, 24–21, 19–23
	Pts: Edwards 26; Rebs: Alston 7 Asts: Pajola 7 PIR: Edwards 20	Boxscore	Pts: Santos 19; Rebs: Lavy, Brissett 5 Asts: Clark 9 PIR: Santos, DiBartolomeo 18	Arena: PalaDozza; Attendance: 3,631; Referees: Emin Moğulkoç, Jakub Zamojski, Anne Panther

21 November 2025	Partizan Mozzart Bet (Basketball Federation of Serbia)	87–99	(Turkish Basketball Federation) Fenerbahçe Beko	Belgrade
20:30	Scoring by quarter: 11–24, 28–32, 29–19, 19–24
	Pts: Brown 27; Rebs: Bonga 8 Asts: Milton 4 PIR: Brown 26	Boxscore	Pts: Jantunen 19; Rebs: Melli 6 Asts: Baldwin 8 PIR: Baldwin 21	Arena: Belgrade Arena; Attendance: 19,561; Referees: Mehdi Difallah, Emilio Pérez, Amit Balak

21 November 2025	Baskonia (Spanish Basketball Federation)	95–73	(German Basketball Federation) Bayern Munich	Vitoria-Gasteiz
20:30	Scoring by quarter: 14–26, 28–15, 25–18, 28–14
	Pts: Luwawu-Cabarrot 18; Rebs: Sedekerskis 7 Asts: Nowell 8 PIR: Sedekerskis, Nowell 20	Boxscore	Pts: Obst 14; Rebs: Dinwiddie 6 Asts: Jović, Hollatz 3 PIR: Jessup 17	Arena: Buesa Arena; Attendance: 8,113; Referees: Tomislav Hordov, Milan Nedović, Hugues Thépénier

21 November 2025	Valencia Basket (Spanish Basketball Federation)	76–73	(Basketball Federation of Serbia) Crvena zvezda Meridianbet	Valencia
21:00	Scoring by quarter: 26–26, 23–13, 11–21, 16–13
	Pts: Badio 16; Rebs: Taylor 6 Asts: Moore 7 PIR: Taylor 17	Boxscore	Pts: Miller-McIntyre 23; Rebs: Miller-McIntyre, Kalinić 8 Asts: Moneke 4 PIR: Miller-McIntyre 22	Arena: Roig Arena; Attendance: 12,114; Referees: Borys Ryzhyk, Artūras Šukys, Maxime Boubert

=== Round 13 ===
25 November 2025	Dubai Basketball (United Arab Emirates Basketball Association)	90–89	(French Federation of Basketball) Paris Basketball	Dubai
17:00	Scoring by quarter: 17–32, 29–13, 13–21, 31–23
	Pts: Wright 24; Rebs: Kabengele 7 Asts: Prepelič 9 PIR: Wright 30	Boxscore	Pts: Willis 22; Rebs: Willis 7 Asts: Robinson 9 PIR: Willis 27	Arena: Coca-Cola Arena; Attendance: 5,117; Referees: Borys Ryzhyk, Jordi Aliaga, Mario Majkić

25 November 2025	Fenerbahçe Beko (Turkish Basketball Federation)	66–64	(Italian Basketball Federation) Virtus Bologna	Istanbul
18:45	Scoring by quarter: 15–17, 15–14, 20–16, 16–17
	Pts: Baldwin 18; Rebs: Melli 6 Asts: Colson 4 PIR: Baldwin 20	Boxscore	Pts: Morgan 13; Rebs: Diouf 12; Asts: Pajola, Vildoza 5 PIR: three players 13	Arena: Ülker Sports and Event Hall; Attendance: 7,932; Referees: Ilija Belošević, Thomas Bissuel, Sašo Petek

25 November 2025	Žalgiris (Lithuanian Basketball Federation)	82–67	(Spanish Basketball Federation) Kosner Baskonia	Kaunas
19:00	Scoring by quarter: 18–24, 19–18, 17–12, 28–13
	Pts: Francisco 23; Rebs: Tubelis 7 Asts: Francisco 11; PIR: Francisco 32	Boxscore	Pts: Luwawu-Cabarrot 18; Rebs: Diop 7 Asts: Nowell 5 PIR: Simmons 12	Arena: Žalgirio Arena; Attendance: 14,755; Referees: Emin Moğulkoç, Kristaps Konstantinovs, Manuel Attard

25 November 2025	Hapoel IBI Tel Aviv (Israeli Basketball Association)	74–75	(Spanish Basketball Federation) Real Madrid	Botevgrad
19:00	Scoring by quarter: 18–22, 18–17, 22–21, 16–15
	Pts: Jones, Blakeney 14; Rebs: Oturu 9 Asts: Micić 5 PIR: Bryant, Blakeney 15	Boxscore	Pts: Hezonja 19; Rebs: Tavares 7 Asts: Campazzo 4 PIR: Hezonja 24	Arena: Arena Botevgrad; Attendance: 3,420; Referees: Sreten Radović, Artūras Šukys, Maxime Boubert

25 November 2025	Panathinaikos AKTOR (Hellenic Basketball Federation)	91–69	(Basketball Federation of Serbia) Partizan Mozzart Bet	Marousi
20:15	Scoring by quarter: 27–31, 21–13, 25–6, 18–19
	Pts: Nunn 26; Rebs: Hernangómez 15; Asts: Sloukas 10; PIR: Nunn 39	Boxscore	Pts: Brown 16; Rebs: Bonga 4 Asts: Milton 5 PIR: Washington 12	Arena: Telekom Center Athens; Attendance: 18,933; Referees: Robert Lottermoser, Oļegs Latiševs, Alberto Baena

25 November 2025	Valencia Basket (Spanish Basketball Federation)	90–64	(German Basketball Federation) Bayern Munich	Valencia
20:30	Scoring by quarter: 19–21, 22–16, 27–12, 22–15
	Pts: Badio 16; Rebs: Puerto 7 Asts: Thompson 4 PIR: Badio 21	Boxscore	Pts: Dinwiddie 12; Rebs: Mike 8 Asts: Jović 5 PIR: Giffey 11	Arena: Roig Arena; Attendance: 11,340; Referees: Mehdi Difallah, Piotr Pastusiak, Vasiliki Tsaroucha

26 November 2025	Maccabi Rapyd Tel Aviv (Israeli Basketball Association)	88–102	(Italian Basketball Federation) EA7 Emporio Armani Milan	Belgrade
18:00	Scoring by quarter: 25–27, 23–27, 14–25, 26–23
	Pts: Walker 21; Rebs: Brissett, Walker 4 Asts: Clark 5 PIR: Walker 21	Boxscore	Pts: Shields 26; Rebs: Shields 7 Asts: Shields, Ellis 6 PIR: Shields 39	Arena: Aleksandar Nikolić Hall; Attendance: 185; Referees: Carlos Peruga, Gytis Vilius, Marcin Kowalski

26 November 2025	Crvena zvezda Meridianbet (Basketball Federation of Serbia)	91–80	(Hellenic Basketball Federation) Olympiacos	Belgrade
19:30	Scoring by quarter: 21–15, 16–23, 22–27, 32–15
	Pts: Nwora 23; Rebs: Moneke 11; Asts: Miller-McIntyre 9 PIR: Nwora 23	Boxscore	Pts: Vezenkov 29; Rebs: Vezenkov 8 Asts: Walkup 8 PIR: Vezenkov 28	Arena: Belgrade Arena; Attendance: 19,921; Referees: Miguel Ángel Perez, Carlos Cortés, Saulius Račys

26 November 2025	Monaco (French Federation of Basketball)	102–66	(Turkish Basketball Federation) Anadolu Efes	Fontvieille
19:30	Scoring by quarter: 25–22, 25–21, 20–10, 32–13
	Pts: Theis 17; Rebs: Mirotić 7 Asts: James 6 PIR: Strazel 21	Boxscore	Pts: Cordinier 16; Rebs: Šmits 5 Asts: Loyd 5 PIR: Cordinier 19	Arena: Salle Gaston Médecin; Attendance: 3,978; Referees: Juan Carlos García, Seffi Shemmesh, Miloš Koljenšić

26 November 2025	Barcelona (Spanish Basketball Federation)	88–78	(French Federation of Basketball) LDLC ASVEL	Barcelona
20:30	Scoring by quarter: 20–19, 25–25, 23–21, 20–13
	Pts: Punter 24; Rebs: Hernangómez, Shengelia 6 Asts: Punter 7 PIR: Punter 33	Boxscore	Pts: de Colo 22; Rebs: Massa 9 Asts: de Colo 9 PIR: de Colo 34	Arena: Palau Blaugrana; Attendance: 5,418; Referees: Tomislav Hordov, Ioannis Foufis, Franko Gracin

=== Round 14 ===
4 December 2025	Anadolu Efes (Turkish Basketball Federation)	75–81	(Spanish Basketball Federation) Real Madrid	Istanbul
18:15	Scoring by quarter: 17–17, 24–20, 18–23, 16–21
	Pts: Šmits 21; Rebs: Loyd 5 Asts: Weiler-Babb 9 PIR: Šmits 24	Boxscore	Pts: Hezonja 22; Rebs: Garuba 7 Asts: Campazzo 6 PIR: Hezonja 20	Arena: Turkcell Basketball Development Center; Attendance: 9,982; Referees: Tomislav Hordov, Milivoje Jovčić, Luka Kardum

4 December 2025	Žalgiris (Lithuanian Basketball Federation)	65–83	(Israeli Basketball Association) Maccabi Rapyd Tel Aviv	Kaunas
19:00	Scoring by quarter: 14–22, 16–29, 16–9, 19–23
	Pts: Francisco 13; Rebs: Tubelis 8 Asts: Francisco 7 PIR: Francisco 15	Boxscore	Pts: Walker 23; Rebs: Hoard, Leaf 9 Asts: three players 4 PIR: Hoard, Walker 19	Arena: Žalgirio Arena; Attendance: 14,873; Referees: Saša Pukl, Joseph Bissang, Hüseyin Çelik

4 December 2025	Monaco (French Federation of Basketball)	125–104	(French Federation of Basketball) Paris Basketball	Fontvieille
19:30	Scoring by quarter: 35–29, 23–17, 33–24, 34–34
	Pts: Okobo 26; Rebs: Blossomgame 7 Asts: Okobo 8 PIR: Okobo 39	Boxscore	Pts: Robinson 24; Rebs: Faye 9 Asts: Hifi 3 PIR: Robinson 24	Arena: Salle Gaston Médecin; Attendance: 4,302; Referees: Robert Lottermoser, Carlos Cortés, Josip Radojković

4 December 2025	Hapoel IBI Tel Aviv (Israeli Basketball Association)	87–80	(French Federation of Basketball) LDLC ASVEL	Botevgrad
20:05	Scoring by quarter: 27–17, 20–24, 17–23, 23–16
	Pts: Oturu 18; Rebs: Bryant, Oturu 7 Asts: Micić 6 PIR: Oturu 18	Boxscore	Pts: de Colo 20; Rebs: Traoré 8 Asts: Watson 6 PIR: de Colo 22	Arena: Arena Botevgrad; Attendance: 780; Referees: Emilio Pérez, Saulius Račys, Vasiliki Tsaroucha

4 December 2025	Partizan Mozzart Bet (Basketball Federation of Serbia)	92–85	(German Basketball Federation) Bayern Munich	Belgrade
20:45	Scoring by quarter: 16–22, 20–21, 28–15, 28–27
	Pts: Washington 22; Rebs: Jones 10; Asts: Washington 6 PIR: Washington 31	Boxscore	Pts: Dinwiddie 25; Rebs: Voigtmann 18; Asts: Voigtmann 7 PIR: Voigtmann 29	Arena: Belgrade Arena; Attendance: 17,249; Referees: Miguel Ángel Pérez, Artūras Šukys, Thomas Bissuel

5 December 2025	Crvena zvezda Meridianbet (Basketball Federation of Serbia)	79–89	(Spanish Basketball Federation) Barcelona	Belgrade
20:00	Scoring by quarter: 17–21, 22–25, 18–17, 22–26
	Pts: Miller-McIntyre 19; Rebs: Moneke 9 Asts: Butler, Miller-McIntyre 5 PIR: Moneke 19	Boxscore	Pts: Clyburn 22; Rebs: Veselý 7 Asts: Punter 6 PIR: Clyburn 24	Arena: Belgrade Arena; Attendance: 20,610; Referees: Emin Moğulkoç, Marcin Kowalski, Guido Giovannetti

5 December 2025	Panathinaikos AKTOR (Hellenic Basketball Federation)	79–89	(Spanish Basketball Federation) Valencia Basket	Marousi
20:15	Scoring by quarter: 22–19, 22–19, 17–27, 18–24
	Pts: Nunn 23; Rebs: Hernangómez 8 Asts: Sloukas, Grant 7 PIR: Shorts 23	Boxscore	Pts: Thompson 19; Rebs: Thompson 8 Asts: Thompson 6 PIR: Thompson 28	Arena: Telekom Center Athens; Attendance: 18,911; Referees: Ilija Belošević, Milan Nedović, Gytis Vilius

5 December 2025	Virtus Bologna (Italian Basketball Federation)	79–78	(United Arab Emirates Basketball Association) Dubai Basketball	Bologna
20:30	Scoring by quarter: 26–17, 13–27, 15–12, 25–22
	Pts: Edwards 23; Rebs: Diouf 9 Asts: Vildoza 5 PIR: Edwards 20	Boxscore	Pts: Anderson 16; Rebs: Bertāns 8 Asts: Wright 8 PIR: Kamenjaš 20	Arena: Virtus Arena; Attendance: 8,107; Referees: Sreten Radović, Sérgio Silva, Can Mavisu

5 December 2025	Kosner Baskonia (Spanish Basketball Federation)	88–78	(Italian Basketball Federation) EA7 Emporio Armani Milan	Vitoria-Gasteiz
20:30	Scoring by quarter: 23–20, 26–22, 21–12, 18–24
	Pts: Luwawu-Cabarrot 21; Rebs: Diop 8 Asts: Kurucs 5 PIR: Luwawu-Cabarrot 24	Boxscore	Pts: Bolmaro, Brooks 16; Rebs: Shields 7 Asts: Bolmaro, Ellis 4 PIR: Bolmaro 17	Arena: Buesa Arena; Attendance: 8,097; Referees: Borys Ryzhyk, Piotr Pastusiak, Dragan Porobić

17 March 2026	Olympiacos (Hellenic Basketball Federation)	104–87	(Turkish Basketball Federation) Fenerbahçe Beko	Piraeus
20:15	Scoring by quarter: 23–29, 25–17, 26–21, 30–20
	Pts: Fournier 36; Rebs: Milutinov 7 Asts: Walkup 11; PIR: Fournier 36	Boxscore	Pts: Horton-Tucker 30; Rebs: Horton-Tucker 6 Asts: Baldwin 8 PIR: Horton-Tucker 31	Arena: Peace and Friendship Stadium; Attendance: 12,747; Referees: Carlos Peruga, Oļegs Latiševs, Hugues Thépénier
Note: Originally scheduled for 4 December 2025, the game was postponed due to flooding of the venue.

=== Round 15 ===
11 December 2025	Maccabi Rapyd Tel Aviv (Israeli Basketball Association)	92–84	(French Federation of Basketball) LDLC ASVEL	Tel Aviv
20:05	Scoring by quarter: 21–19, 26–28, 22–18, 23–19
	Pts: Walker 29; Rebs: Walker 9 Asts: Blatt 5 PIR: Walker 33	Boxscore	Pts: Watson 21; Rebs: Seljaas, Ndiaye 6 Asts: de Colo 7 PIR: de Colo 20	Arena: Menora Mivtachim Arena; Attendance: 10,169; Referees: Emin Moğulkoç, Jakub Zamojski, Miloš Koljenšić

11 December 2025	Valencia Basket (Spanish Basketball Federation)	94–82	(Turkish Basketball Federation) Anadolu Efes	Valencia
20:30	Scoring by quarter: 22–20, 23–19, 26–20, 23–23
	Pts: Taylor 20; Rebs: Costello, Taylor 5 Asts: Montero, Moore 5 PIR: Taylor 24	Boxscore	Pts: Cordinier, Loyd 18; Rebs: Šmits 5 Asts: Weiler-Babb 4 PIR: Cordinier 18	Arena: Roig Arena; Attendance: 10,835; Referees: Mehdi Difallah, Ioannis Foufis, Stefan Ćalić

11 December 2025	EA7 Emporio Armani Milan (Italian Basketball Federation)	96–89	(Hellenic Basketball Federation) Panathinaikos AKTOR	Assago
20:30	Scoring by quarter: 21–26, 33–18, 26–15, 16–30
	Pts: Brooks 26; Rebs: Nebo, Brooks 5 Asts: Ellis 8 PIR: Brooks 25	Boxscore	Pts: Sloukas 19; Rebs: Faried, Mitoglou 8 Asts: Sloukas 7 PIR: Sloukas 27	Arena: Unipol Forum; Attendance: 10,396; Referees: Miguel Ángel Pérez, Artūras Šukys, Steve Bittner

11 December 2025	Paris Basketball (French Federation of Basketball)	105–108	(Lithuanian Basketball Federation) Žalgiris	Paris
20:45	Scoring by quarter: 29–28, 27–20, 17–32, 32–28
	Pts: Hifi 27; Rebs: Dokossi, Faye 7 Asts: Robinson 6 PIR: Hifi 26	Boxscore	Pts: Francisco 26; Rebs: Tubelis 11; Asts: Williams-Goss 10; PIR: Francisco 28	Arena: Adidas Arena; Attendance: 6,764; Referees: Borys Ryzhyk, Tomislav Hordov, Michele Rossi

11 December 2025	Real Madrid (Spanish Basketball Federation)	94–87	(Spanish Basketball Federation) Kosner Baskonia	Madrid
21:00	Scoring by quarter: 24–23, 18–16, 29–21, 23–27
	Pts: Hezonja 17; Rebs: Okeke 8 Asts: Campazzo 5 PIR: Campazzo 22	Boxscore	Pts: Howard 22; Rebs: Diakite, Luwawu-Cabarrot 5 Asts: Forrest 7 PIR: Howard, Luwawu-Cabarrot 21	Arena: Movistar Arena; Attendance: 8,141; Referees: Saša Pukl, Oļegs Latiševs, Tomasz Trawicki

12 December 2025	Dubai Basketball (United Arab Emirates Basketball Association)	89–88	(German Basketball Federation) Bayern Munich	Dubai
17:00	Scoring by quarter: 24–23, 18–23, 16–20, 31–22
	Pts: Wright 22; Rebs: Abass 7 Asts: Wright 7 PIR: Wright 28	Boxscore	Pts: Obst 21; Rebs: Voigtmann 6 Asts: Dinwiddie, Lučić 6 PIR: Voigtmann 19	Arena: Coca-Cola Arena; Attendance: 6,017; Referees: Milan Nedović, Sašo Petek, Guido Giovannetti

12 December 2025	Monaco (French Federation of Basketball)	86–92	(Turkish Basketball Federation) Fenerbahçe Beko	Fontvieille
19:30	Scoring by quarter: 21–14, 25–24, 23–22, 17–32
	Pts: James 20; Rebs: Mirotić 7 Asts: Mirotić 6 PIR: Diallo 22	Boxscore	Pts: Horton-Tucker 24; Rebs: Melli 10; Asts: Baldwin 7 PIR: Horton-Tucker 22	Arena: Salle Gaston Médecin; Attendance: 4,487; Referees: Juan Carlos García, Milivoje Jovčić, Rain Peerandi

12 December 2025	Virtus Bologna (Italian Basketball Federation)	74–79	(Israeli Basketball Association) Hapoel IBI Tel Aviv	Bologna
20:30	Scoring by quarter: 24–21, 18–15, 15–14, 17–29
	Pts: Morgan 21; Rebs: Diouf 8 Asts: Vildoza 10; PIR: Morgan, Diouf 18	Boxscore	Pts: Bryant 22; Rebs: Oturu 10; Asts: Jones 5 PIR: Oturu 30	Arena: Virtus Arena; Attendance: 5,112; Referees: Damir Javor, Gytis Vilius, Jordi Aliaga

12 December 2025	Partizan Mozzart Bet (Basketball Federation of Serbia)	79–76	(Basketball Federation of Serbia) Crvena zvezda Meridianbet	Belgrade
20:30	Scoring by quarter: 15–18, 20–21, 14–21, 30–16
	Pts: Washington 25; Rebs: Bonga 11; Asts: Calathes, Milton 3 PIR: Jones 30	Boxscore	Pts: Nwora, Butler 20; Rebs: Nwora 7 Asts: Miller-McIntyre 6 PIR: Nwora 20	Arena: Belgrade Arena; Attendance: 21,854; Referees: Carlos Peruga, Emilio Pérez, Kristaps Konstantinovs

12 December 2025	Barcelona (Spanish Basketball Federation)	98–85	(Hellenic Basketball Federation) Olympiacos	Barcelona
20:30	Scoring by quarter: 21–22, 21–17, 30–17, 26–29
	Pts: Clyburn 28; Rebs: three players 6 Asts: Satoranský, Veselý 4 PIR: Clyburn 33	Boxscore	Pts: Vezenkov 22; Rebs: Hall 8 Asts: Walkup 10; PIR: Vezenkov 25	Arena: Palau Blaugrana; Attendance: 5,572; Referees: Sreten Radović, Saulius Račys, Maxime Boubert

=== Round 16 ===
16 December 2025	Dubai Basketball (United Arab Emirates Basketball Association)	95–97	(Israeli Basketball Association) Maccabi Rapyd Tel Aviv	Dubai
17:00	Scoring by quarter: 30–23, 22–28, 14–28, 29–18
	Pts: Wright 26; Rebs: Wright 7 Asts: Wright 10; PIR: Wright 42	Boxscore	Pts: Hoard 21; Rebs: Hoard 6 Asts: Clark 7 PIR: Hoard 23	Arena: Coca-Cola Arena; Attendance: 0 (Note: Dubai Basketball's home game against Maccabi Rapyd Tel Aviv was played behind closed doors for security reasons.); Referees: Ilija Belošević, Jordi Aliaga, Hugues Thépénier

16 December 2025	Fenerbahçe Beko (Turkish Basketball Federation)	77–81	(Hellenic Basketball Federation) Panathinaikos AKTOR	Istanbul
18:45	Scoring by quarter: 16–17, 21–24, 20–9, 20–31
	Pts: Horton-Tucker 22; Rebs: Melli, Horton-Tucker 6 Asts: Baldwin 7 PIR: Horton-Tucker 22	Boxscore	Pts: Nunn 25; Rebs: Faried 7 Asts: Sloukas 7 PIR: Nunn 22	Arena: Ülker Sports and Event Hall; Attendance: 12,813; Referees: Sreten Radović, Piotr Pastusiak, Maxime Boubert

16 December 2025	Hapoel IBI Tel Aviv (Israeli Basketball Association)	84–78	(Basketball Federation of Serbia) Crvena zvezda Meridianbet	Jerusalem
20:05	Scoring by quarter: 21–21, 19–16, 21–22, 23–19
	Pts: Bryant 28; Rebs: Malcolm 11; Asts: Bryant 5 PIR: Bryant 37	Boxscore	Pts: Butler 27; Rebs: Izundu 6 Asts: Butler 8 PIR: Butler 29	Arena: Pais Arena; Attendance: 6,230; Referees: Mehdi Difallah, Ioannis Foufis, Alberto Baena

16 December 2025	Olympiacos (Hellenic Basketball Federation)	92–99	(Spanish Basketball Federation) Valencia Basket	Piraeus
20:15	Scoring by quarter: 27–25, 20–24, 29–18, 16–32
	Pts: Vezenkov 24; Rebs: Milutinov, Vezenkov 8 Asts: Walkup 8 PIR: Milutinov 31	Boxscore	Pts: Reuvers 21; Rebs: Moore, Key 5 Asts: Montero 8 PIR: Thompson 20	Arena: Peace and Friendship Stadium; Attendance: 10,897; Referees: Saša Pukl, Luka Kardum, Amit Balak

16 December 2025	EA7 Emporio Armani Milan (Italian Basketball Federation)	89–82	(Spanish Basketball Federation) Real Madrid	Milan
20:30	Scoring by quarter: 23–21, 27–18, 16–21, 23–22
	Pts: Gudurić 22; Rebs: Gudurić 5 Asts: Shields, Gudurić 3 PIR: Gudurić 21	Boxscore	Pts: Campazzo 25; Rebs: Lyles, Okeke 7 Asts: Lyles 3 PIR: Campazzo 28	Arena: Allianz Cloud Arena; Attendance: 3,503; Referees: Emin Moğulkoç, Saulius Račys, Sašo Petek

16 December 2025	Paris Basketball (French Federation of Basketball)	69–85	(Spanish Basketball Federation) Barcelona	Paris
20:45	Scoring by quarter: 13–30, 16–22, 23–16, 17–17
	Pts: Hifi 16; Rebs: Dokossi 9 Asts: Robinson 5 PIR: Dokossi 24	Boxscore	Pts: Punter 21; Rebs: Clyburn 12; Asts: Satoranský 5 PIR: Clyburn 33	Arena: Adidas Arena; Attendance: 7,933; Referees: Damir Javor, Gytis Vilius, Hüseyin Çelik

17 December 2025	Žalgiris (Lithuanian Basketball Federation)	64–87	(Turkish Basketball Federation) Anadolu Efes	Kaunas
19:00	Scoring by quarter: 17–28, 18–9, 16–26, 13–24
	Pts: Williams-Goss 11; Rebs: Tubelis, Ulanovas 6 Asts: Francisco 5 PIR: Ulanovas 17	Boxscore	Pts: Swider 18; Rebs: Poirier 6 Asts: Weiler-Babb 13; PIR: Weiler-Babb 21	Arena: Žalgirio Arena; Attendance: 14,506; Referees: Robert Lottermoser, Milan Nedović, Josip Radojković

17 December 2025	LDLC ASVEL (French Federation of Basketball)	76–74	(German Basketball Federation) Bayern Munich	Décines-Charpieu
20:00	Scoring by quarter: 15–22, 27–16, 9–24, 25–12
	Pts: Heurtel 15; Rebs: Traoré 6 Asts: Watson 6 PIR: Watson 20	Boxscore	Pts: Dinwiddie 15; Rebs: four players 4 Asts: Dinwiddie, Voigtmann 5 PIR: Jović 17	Arena: LDLC Arena; Attendance: 8,422; Referees: Carlos Peruga, Seffi Shemmesh, Leandro Lezcano

17 December 2025	Partizan Mozzart Bet (Basketball Federation of Serbia)	68–86	(Italian Basketball Federation) Virtus Bologna	Belgrade
20:30	Scoring by quarter: 19–24, 18–16, 15–23, 16–23
	Pts: Brown 15; Rebs: Fernando 7 Asts: Calathes 5 PIR: Bonga 16	Boxscore	Pts: Edwards 20; Rebs: Jallow 6 Asts: Morgan 5 PIR: Alston 21	Arena: Belgrade Arena; Attendance: 16,435; Referees: Juan Carlos García, Borys Ryzhyk, Eduard Udyanskyy

17 December 2025	Kosner Baskonia (Spanish Basketball Federation)	85–73	(French Federation of Basketball) Monaco	Vitoria-Gasteiz
20:30	Scoring by quarter: 17–14, 26–20, 19–21, 23–18
	Pts: Luwawu-Cabarrot 19; Rebs: Diop 8 Asts: Forrest 5 PIR: Forrest 27	Boxscore	Pts: James 21; Rebs: Theis 7 Asts: James 5 PIR: James 21	Arena: Buesa Arena; Attendance: 7,234; Referees: Tomislav Hordov, Artūras Šukys, Marcin Kowalski

=== Round 17 ===
18 December 2025	Maccabi Rapyd Tel Aviv (Israeli Basketball Association)	85–82	(Spanish Basketball Federation) Valencia Basket	Jerusalem
19:00	Scoring by quarter: 19–21, 28–20, 23–20, 15–21
	Pts: Walker 14; Rebs: Hoard 7 Asts: Lundberg 7 PIR: Lundberg 21	Boxscore	Pts: Taylor 15; Rebs: Taylor 8 Asts: Montero, Thompson 5 PIR: Taylor, Costello 19	Arena: Pais Arena; Attendance: 9,054; Referees: Milivoje Jovčić, Kristaps Konstantinovs, Guido Giovannetti

18 December 2025	Panathinaikos AKTOR (Hellenic Basketball Federation)	93–82	(Israeli Basketball Association) Hapoel IBI Tel Aviv	Marousi
20:15	Scoring by quarter: 22–17, 23–29, 20–16, 28–20
	Pts: Nunn 19; Rebs: Faried 11; Asts: Grant 6 PIR: Nunn 19	Boxscore	Pts: Ennis 16; Rebs: Oturu 11; Asts: Jones 6 PIR: Jones, Bryant 17	Arena: Telekom Center Athens; Attendance: 18,930; Referees: Emin Moğulkoç, Carlos Cortés, Thomas Bissuel

18 December 2025	EA7 Emporio Armani Milan (Italian Basketball Federation)	72–87	(Turkish Basketball Federation) Fenerbahçe Beko	Milan
20:30	Scoring by quarter: 11–19, 21–21, 23–16, 17–31
	Pts: Brooks 18; Rebs: Shields 6 Asts: Ellis 5 PIR: Ellis 18	Boxscore	Pts: Horton-Tucker 23; Rebs: Melli 7 Asts: Baldwin 6 PIR: Horton-Tucker 25	Arena: Allianz Cloud Arena; Attendance: 3,853; Referees: Ilija Belošević, Miloš Koljenšić, Alberto Baena

18 December 2025	Real Madrid (Spanish Basketball Federation)	95–90	(French Federation of Basketball) Paris Basketball	Madrid
20:45	Scoring by quarter: 24–21, 25–29, 21–24, 25–16
	Pts: Maledon 21; Rebs: Okeke 8 Asts: Lyles 6 PIR: Maledon 27	Boxscore	Pts: Rhoden 19; Rebs: Dokossi 9 Asts: Hifi 5 PIR: Rhoden 26	Arena: Movistar Arena; Attendance: 7,923; Referees: Sreten Radović, Sérgio Silva, Stefan Ćalić

19 December 2025	Anadolu Efes (Turkish Basketball Federation)	76–80	(United Arab Emirates Basketball Association) Dubai Basketball	Istanbul
18:30	Scoring by quarter: 20–17, 17–13, 20–22, 19–28
	Pts: three players 12; Rebs: Osmani, Weiler-Babb 5 Asts: Weiler-Babb 5 PIR: Weiler-Babb 16	Boxscore	Pts: Kabengele 20; Rebs: Kabengele 7 Asts: Wright 15; PIR: Wright 35	Arena: Turkcell Basketball Development Center; Attendance: 9,121; Referees: Carlos Peruga, Michele Rossi, Uroš Obrknežević

19 December 2025	Žalgiris (Lithuanian Basketball Federation)	109–68	(Basketball Federation of Serbia) Partizan Mozzart Bet	Kaunas
19:00	Scoring by quarter: 28–15, 25–15, 29–18, 27–20
	Pts: Francisco 22; Rebs: Ulanovas 8 Asts: Lô 6 PIR: Wright 27	Boxscore	Pts: Washington 17; Rebs: Fernando, Bonga 4 Asts: Calathes 8 PIR: Fernando 20	Arena: Žalgirio Arena; Attendance: 14,627; Referees: Mehdi Difallah, Rain Peerandi, Vasiliki Tsaroucha

19 December 2025	Monaco (French Federation of Basketball)	103–77	(German Basketball Federation) Bayern Munich	Fontvieille
19:30	Scoring by quarter: 18–17, 29–22, 35–16, 21–22
	Pts: Okobo 18; Rebs: Diallo 7 Asts: Diallo 7 PIR: Okobo, Diallo 24	Boxscore	Pts: da Silva 13; Rebs: da Silva, Mike 4 Asts: Dinwiddie 3 PIR: da Silva, Jović 10	Arena: Salle Gaston Médecin; Attendance: 4,258; Referees: Emilio Pérez, Gytis Vilius, Dragan Porobić

19 December 2025	Olympiacos (Hellenic Basketball Federation)	107–84	(French Federation of Basketball) LDLC ASVEL	Piraeus
20:15	Scoring by quarter: 26–14, 18–20, 31–22, 32–28
	Pts: Dorsey 22; Rebs: Peters 7 Asts: Dorsey 6 PIR: Vezenkov 28	Boxscore	Pts: Harrison 11; Rebs: Harrison, Ndiaye 5 Asts: Heurtel 8 PIR: Ndiaye 15	Arena: Peace and Friendship Stadium; Attendance: 11,027; Referees: Miguel Ángel Pérez, Igor Dragojević, Kerem Baki

19 December 2025	Barcelona (Spanish Basketball Federation)	134–124(OT)	(Spanish Basketball Federation) Kosner Baskonia	Barcelona
20:30	Scoring by quarter: 17–26, 30–27, 23–22, 27–22, Overtime: 9–9, 16–16, 12–2
	Pts: Punter 43; Rebs: Hernangómez, Satoranský 8 Asts: Satoranský 6 PIR: Punter 40	Boxscore	Pts: Howard 33; Rebs: Frisch 9 Asts: Forrest 8 PIR: Howard 35	Arena: Palau Blaugrana; Attendance: 5,462; Referees: Robert Lottermoser, Milan Nedović, Manuel Attard

19 December 2025	Crvena zvezda Meridianbet (Basketball Federation of Serbia)	90–89	(Italian Basketball Federation) Virtus Bologna	Belgrade
20:45	Scoring by quarter: 23–15, 22–31, 25–24, 20–19
	Pts: Miller-McIntyre 21; Rebs: Moneke 7 Asts: Miller-McIntyre 10; PIR: Miller-McIntyre 23	Boxscore	Pts: Edwards 29; Rebs: three players 4 Asts: Vildoza 9 PIR: Vildoza 27	Arena: Belgrade Arena; Attendance: 14,232; Referees: Oļegs Latiševs, Jakub Zamojski, Tomasz Trawicki

=== Round 18 ===
23 December 2025	Dubai Basketball (United Arab Emirates Basketball Association)	99–92	(Italian Basketball Federation) EA7 Emporio Armani Milan	Dubai
17:00	Scoring by quarter: 31–20, 25–29, 16–22, 27–21
	Pts: Bacon 25; Rebs: Kabengele, Bacon 8 Asts: Wright 9 PIR: Wright 30	Boxscore	Pts: Nebo 15; Rebs: Gudurić 7 Asts: Gudurić 7 PIR: LeDay 19	Arena: Coca-Cola Arena; Attendance: 5,653; Referees: Robert Lottermoser, Oļegs Latiševs, Hüseyin Çelik

23 December 2025	Fenerbahçe Beko (Turkish Basketball Federation)	72–71	(Spanish Basketball Federation) Barcelona	Istanbul
18:45	Scoring by quarter: 17–13, 18–20, 18–19, 19–19
	Pts: Horton-Tucker, Biberović 16; Rebs: Melli 10; Asts: Hall 4 PIR: Melli 16	Boxscore	Pts: Punter 20; Rebs: Hernangómez 9 Asts: Laprovíttola 6 PIR: Brizuela 18	Arena: Ülker Sports and Event Hall; Attendance: 9,796; Referees: Tomislav Hordov, Ioannis Foufis, Luka Kardum

23 December 2025	Žalgiris (Lithuanian Basketball Federation)	85–92	(Hellenic Basketball Federation) Panathinaikos AKTOR	Kaunas
19:00	Scoring by quarter: 28–19, 22–21, 14–23, 21–29
	Pts: Wright 22; Rebs: Wright 6 Asts: Williams-Goss 7 PIR: Wright 26	Boxscore	Pts: Osman 22; Rebs: Faried 9 Asts: Shorts 10; PIR: Osman 28	Arena: Žalgirio Arena; Attendance: 14,815; Referees: Emilio Pérez, Jakub Zamojski, Kristaps Konstantinovs

23 December 2025	Bayern Munich (German Basketball Federation)	72–82	(Israeli Basketball Association) Hapoel IBI Tel Aviv	Munich
19:30	Scoring by quarter: 14–21, 18–23, 14–20, 26–18
	Pts: Obst 18; Rebs: Mike 5 Asts: Giffey, Mike 3 PIR: Obst 16	Boxscore	Pts: Bryant 18; Rebs: four players 7 Asts: Oturu 3 PIR: Bryant, Oturu 21	Arena: SAP Garden; Attendance: 11,500; Referees: Saša Pukl, Joseph Bissang, Vasiliki Tsaroucha

23 December 2025	Valencia Basket (Spanish Basketball Federation)	91–81	(Spanish Basketball Federation) Kosner Baskonia	Valencia
20:30	Scoring by quarter: 27–19, 31–28, 18–18, 15–16
	Pts: Costello 18; Rebs: Costello 6 Asts: Thompson, Moore 5 PIR: Costello 22	Boxscore	Pts: Omoruyi 17; Rebs: Omoruyi 5 Asts: Simmons 4 PIR: Omoruyi 25	Arena: Roig Arena; Attendance: 12,320; Referees: Sreten Radović, Seffi Shemmesh, Maxime Boubert

23 December 2025	Paris Basketball (French Federation of Basketball)	102–92	(Basketball Federation of Serbia) Crvena zvezda Meridianbet	Paris
20:45	Scoring by quarter: 28–18, 23–28, 28–12, 23–34
	Pts: Robinson 16; Rebs: Dokossi, Willis 6 Asts: Robinson 8 PIR: Robinson 19	Boxscore	Pts: Butler 31; Rebs: Moneke 10; Asts: Moneke, Miller-McIntyre 5 PIR: Butler 29	Arena: Accor Arena; Attendance: 12,440; Referees: Emin Moğulkoç, Saulius Račys, Adar Peer

23 December 2025	LDLC ASVEL (French Federation of Basketball)	103–99(OT)	(Turkish Basketball Federation) Anadolu Efes	Décines-Charpieu
20:45	Scoring by quarter: 24–23, 17–18, 17–21, 22–18, Overtime: 12–12, 11–7
	Pts: Vautier 28; Rebs: Ndiaye 8 Asts: Heurtel 8 PIR: Vautier 31	Boxscore	Pts: Weiler-Babb, Cordinier 20; Rebs: Poirier 8 Asts: Weiler-Babb 8 PIR: Weiler-Babb 28	Arena: LDLC Arena; Attendance: 8,791; Referees: Damir Javor, Piotr Pastusiak, Guido Giovannetti

26 December 2025	Partizan Mozzart Bet (Basketball Federation of Serbia)	87–112	(Israeli Basketball Association) Maccabi Rapyd Tel Aviv	Belgrade
18:00	Scoring by quarter: 31–30, 12–28, 16–34, 28–20
	Pts: Payne 15; Rebs: Jones 6 Asts: Payne 6 PIR: Payne 21	Boxscore	Pts: Walker 20; Rebs: Sorkin, Leaf 6 Asts: Blatt 7 PIR: Sorkin 26	Arena: Belgrade Arena; Attendance: 13,749; Referees: Miguel Ángel Pérez, Artūras Šukys, Michele Rossi

26 December 2025	Monaco (French Federation of Basketball)	100–95	(Spanish Basketball Federation) Real Madrid	Fontvieille
19:30	Scoring by quarter: 21–20, 26–23, 23–27, 30–25
	Pts: Okobo 22; Rebs: three players 7 Asts: James 5 PIR: Okobo 19	Boxscore	Pts: Campazzo 28; Rebs: Tavares 11; Asts: Campazzo 10; PIR: Campazzo 41	Arena: Salle Gaston Médecin; Attendance: 5,000; Referees: Milan Nedović, Miloš Koljenšić, Eduard Udyanskyy

26 December 2025	Virtus Bologna (Italian Basketball Federation)	94–97	(Hellenic Basketball Federation) Olympiacos	Bologna
20:30	Scoring by quarter: 25–23, 16–27, 19–27, 34–20
	Pts: Vildoza 17; Rebs: Diouf, Niang 4 Asts: Morgan 5 PIR: Vildoza 21	Boxscore	Pts: Dorsey 23; Rebs: Milutinov 9 Asts: Milutinov 5 PIR: Milutinov 24	Arena: Virtus Arena; Attendance: 10,059; Referees: Ilija Belošević, Milivoje Jovčić, Hugues Thépénier

=== Round 19 ===
30 December 2025	Hapoel IBI Tel Aviv (Israeli Basketball Association)	80–93	(Lithuanian Basketball Federation) Žalgiris	Tel Aviv
20:05	Scoring by quarter: 25–18, 15–21, 13–24, 27–30
	Pts: Jones 18; Rebs: Bryant 4 Asts: Wainright 6 PIR: Jones 19	Boxscore	Pts: Williams-Goss 17; Rebs: Tubelis 8 Asts: Francisco 8 PIR: Tubelis, Francisco 15	Arena: Menora Mivtachim Arena; Attendance: 10,000; Referees: Damir Javor, Miloš Koljenšić, Eduard Udyanskyy

30 December 2025	LDLC ASVEL (French Federation of Basketball)	94–89	(French Federation of Basketball) Paris Basketball	Décines-Charpieu
20:15	Scoring by quarter: 20–23, 21–23, 20–18, 33–25
	Pts: Watson 28; Rebs: Ndiaye 9 Asts: Heurtel 8 PIR: de Colo 24	Boxscore	Pts: Hifi 26; Rebs: Stevens, Morgan 7 Asts: Hifi 7 PIR: Hifi 30	Arena: LDLC Arena; Attendance: 11,536; Referees: Tomislav Hordov, Jordi Aliaga, Alberto Baena

30 December 2025	Valencia Basket (Spanish Basketball Federation)	86–73	(Basketball Federation of Serbia) Partizan Mozzart Bet	Valencia
20:30	Scoring by quarter: 18–22, 25–21, 22–20, 21–10
	Pts: Thompson 17; Rebs: three players 7 Asts: Thompson 6 PIR: Thompson 22	Boxscore	Pts: Bonga 17; Rebs: Bonga 7 Asts: Calathes 6 PIR: Bonga 23	Arena: Roig Arena; Attendance: 12,731; Referees: Emin Moğulkoç, Jakub Zamojski, Gytis Vilius

30 December 2025	Barcelona (Spanish Basketball Federation)	74–90	(French Federation of Basketball) Monaco	Barcelona
20:30	Scoring by quarter: 13–22, 17–25, 23–22, 21–21
	Pts: Brizuela 25; Rebs: Fall 6 Asts: Satoranský, Punter 4 PIR: Brizuela 21	Boxscore	Pts: James 19; Rebs: Hayes, Blossomgame 5 Asts: James, Okobo 5 PIR: Hayes 24	Arena: Palau Blaugrana; Attendance: 7,212; Referees: Saša Pukl, Piotr Pastusiak, Vasiliki Tsaroucha

2 January 2026	Anadolu Efes (Turkish Basketball Federation)	65–87	(Basketball Federation of Serbia) Crvena zvezda Meridianbet	Istanbul
18:00	Scoring by quarter: 14–21, 11–22, 16–23, 24–21
	Pts: Weiler-Babb 17; Rebs: Weiler-Babb 6 Asts: Cordinier 5 PIR: Weiler-Babb 28	Boxscore	Pts: Nwora 24; Rebs: Moneke 8 Asts: Miller-McIntyre 9 PIR: Nwora 27	Arena: Turkcell Basketball Development Center; Attendance: 8,168; Referees: Robert Lottermoser, Emilio Pérez, Joseph Bissang

2 January 2026	Kosner Baskonia (Spanish Basketball Federation)	93–108	(Turkish Basketball Federation) Fenerbahçe Beko	Vitoria-Gasteiz
20:00	Scoring by quarter: 28–24, 25–29, 29–32, 11–23
	Pts: Luwawu-Cabarrot 20; Rebs: Luwawu-Cabarrot 7 Asts: Forrest 4 PIR: Luwawu-Cabarrot 22	Boxscore	Pts: Baldwin 24; Rebs: Melli 7 Asts: Baldwin 7 PIR: Baldwin 29	Arena: Buesa Arena; Attendance: 14,114; Referees: Mehdi Difallah, Borys Ryzhyk, Rain Peerandi

2 January 2026	Panathinaikos AKTOR (Hellenic Basketball Federation)	82–87	(Hellenic Basketball Federation) Olympiacos	Marousi
20:15	Scoring by quarter: 13–28, 30–15, 18–18, 21–26
	Pts: Nunn 32; Rebs: Faried, Nunn 5 Asts: Nunn 6 PIR: Nunn 40	Boxscore	Pts: Vezenkov 24; Rebs: Milutinov, Vezenkov 9 Asts: Walkup 5 PIR: Milutinov 27	Arena: Telekom Center Athens; Attendance: 18,999; Referees: Carlos Peruga, Oļegs Latiševs, Milan Nedović

2 January 2026	Virtus Bologna (Italian Basketball Federation)	97–85	(Italian Basketball Federation) EA7 Emporio Armani Milan	Bologna
20:30	Scoring by quarter: 14–27, 33–20, 30–19, 20–19
	Pts: Morgan 22; Rebs: Niang 8 Asts: Morgan 6 PIR: Morgan, Niang 22	Boxscore	Pts: Nebo 15; Rebs: Booker 6 Asts: Ellis, Gudurić 4 PIR: Nebo 25	Arena: Virtus Arena; Attendance: 10,102; Referees: Miguel Ángel Pérez, Carlos Cortés, Sérgio Silva

2 January 2026	Real Madrid (Spanish Basketball Federation)	107–93	(United Arab Emirates Basketball Association) Dubai Basketball	Madrid
20:45	Scoring by quarter: 27–24, 17–34, 29–16, 34–19
	Pts: Hezonja 20; Rebs: Deck 7 Asts: Campazzo 6 PIR: Lyles 21	Boxscore	Pts: Bacon 26; Rebs: Kabengele 4 Asts: Avramović 7 PIR: Wright 16	Arena: Movistar Arena; Attendance: 9,875; Referees: Sreten Radović, Artūras Šukys, Sašo Petek

2 January 2026	Bayern Munich (German Basketball Federation)	95–71	(Israeli Basketball Association) Maccabi Rapyd Tel Aviv	Munich
21:00	Scoring by quarter: 31–23, 19–18, 26–13, 19–17
	Pts: McCormack 18; Rebs: three players 7 Asts: Jović 6 PIR: McCormack 27	Boxscore	Pts: Brissett 13; Rebs: three players 5 Asts: Blatt, Clark 4 PIR: Brissett 17	Arena: SAP Garden; Attendance: 11,500; Referees: Juan Carlos García, Saulius Račys, Robert Vyklický

=== Round 20 ===
6 January 2026	Fenerbahçe Beko (Turkish Basketball Federation)	88–80	(Hellenic Basketball Federation) Olympiacos	Istanbul
18:45	Scoring by quarter: 18–22, 18–18, 26–22, 26–18
	Pts: Horton-Tucker, Baldwin 17; Rebs: Melli 7 Asts: Baldwin 11; PIR: Baldwin 26	Boxscore	Pts: Vezenkov 24; Rebs: Hall 11; Asts: Walkup 5 PIR: Vezenkov 32	Arena: Ülker Sports and Event Hall; Attendance: 10,452; Referees: Sreten Radović, Carlos Cortés, Sérgio Silva

6 January 2026	Monaco (French Federation of Basketball)	101–84	(Basketball Federation of Serbia) Partizan Mozzart Bet	Fontvieille
19:30	Scoring by quarter: 28–21, 26–18, 20–24, 27–21
	Pts: Diallo 14; Rebs: Theis, Diallo 5 Asts: James 8 PIR: Mirotić 18	Boxscore	Pts: Brown 19; Rebs: Bonga 5 Asts: Payne 5 PIR: Brown 17	Arena: Salle Gaston Médecin; Attendance: 3,898; Referees: Juan Carlos García, Oļegs Latiševs, Steve Bittner

6 January 2026	LDLC ASVEL (French Federation of Basketball)	69–80	(Spanish Basketball Federation) Real Madrid	Décines-Charpieu
20:00	Scoring by quarter: 18–17, 23–19, 20–20, 8–24
	Pts: Watson 14; Rebs: Traoré 8 Asts: Heurtel 5 PIR: Traoré 12	Boxscore	Pts: Lyles 21; Rebs: Tavares 9 Asts: four players 3 PIR: Lyles 26	Arena: LDLC Arena; Attendance: 8,803; Referees: Robert Lottermoser, Saulius Račys, Christian Theis

6 January 2026	Crvena zvezda Meridianbet (Basketball Federation of Serbia)	89–106	(Spanish Basketball Federation) Valencia Basket	Belgrade
20:00	Scoring by quarter: 20–34, 17–20, 27–23, 25–29
	Pts: Nwora 22; Rebs: Moneke 9 Asts: Butler 9 PIR: Moneke 24	Boxscore	Pts: Montero 25; Rebs: Key 6 Asts: three players 4 PIR: Montero 31	Arena: Aleksandar Nikolić Hall; Attendance: 5,672; Referees: Mehdi Difallah, Piotr Pastusiak, Eduard Udyanskyy

6 January 2026	Hapoel IBI Tel Aviv (Israeli Basketball Association)	85–60	(United Arab Emirates Basketball Association) Dubai Basketball	Tel Aviv
20:05	Scoring by quarter: 17–24, 19–17, 33–13, 16–6
	Pts: Blakeney 25; Rebs: Bryant 8 Asts: three players 2 PIR: Blakeney 29	Boxscore	Pts: Petrušev 13; Rebs: Kabengele 7 Asts: Wright 4 PIR: Avramović 12	Arena: Menora Mivtachim Arena; Attendance: 7,000; Referees: Emin Moğulkoç, Milivoje Jovčić, Igor Dragojević

6 January 2026	Panathinaikos AKTOR (Hellenic Basketball Federation)	74–87	(Italian Basketball Federation) EA7 Emporio Armani Milan	Marousi
20:15	Scoring by quarter: 20–15, 23–23, 15–23, 16–26
	Pts: Hernangómez 17; Rebs: Hernangómez 7 Asts: Sloukas 10; PIR: Hernangómez, Sloukas 22	Boxscore	Pts: Brooks 24; Rebs: Nebo, Ricci 7 Asts: three players 5 PIR: Brooks 28	Arena: Telekom Center Athens; Attendance: 18,790; Referees: Damir Javor, Gytis Vilius, Marcin Kowalski

6 January 2026	Virtus Bologna (Italian Basketball Federation)	83–79	(Lithuanian Basketball Federation) Žalgiris	Bologna
20:30	Scoring by quarter: 25–22, 18–12, 20–22, 20–23
	Pts: Alston 20; Rebs: Niang 7 Asts: Pajola, Morgan 4 PIR: Alston 19	Boxscore	Pts: Tubelis 22; Rebs: Wright 7 Asts: Francisco 10; PIR: Williams-Goss 25	Arena: Virtus Arena; Attendance: 7,684; Referees: Saša Pukl, Borys Ryzhyk, Franko Gracin

6 January 2026	Barcelona (Spanish Basketball Federation)	93–83	(Israeli Basketball Association) Maccabi Rapyd Tel Aviv	Barcelona
20:30	Scoring by quarter: 32–19, 24–25, 21–19, 16–20
	Pts: Shengelia 22; Rebs: Hernangómez 10; Asts: Satoranský 6 PIR: Shengelia 27	Boxscore	Pts: Blatt 17; Rebs: Hoard 5 Asts: Blatt 9 PIR: Blatt 26	Arena: Palau Blaugrana; Attendance: 0 (Note: Barcelona played their regular season home game against Maccabi Rapyd Tel Aviv behind closed doors for safety reasons.); Referees: Milan Nedović, Jakub Zamojski, Stefan Ćalić

7 January 2026	Anadolu Efes (Turkish Basketball Federation)	79–84	(French Federation of Basketball) Paris Basketball	Istanbul
18:30	Scoring by quarter: 21–19, 18–21, 25–25, 15–19
	Pts: Lee 17; Rebs: Weiler-Babb 8 Asts: Lee 6 PIR: Lee 21	Boxscore	Pts: Hifi 27; Rebs: Cavalière, Morgan 5 Asts: Dokossi 4 PIR: Hifi 23	Arena: Turkcell Basketball Development Center; Attendance: 6,403; Referees: Miguel Ángel Pérez, Luka Kardum, Arnau Padrós

7 January 2026	Bayern Munich (German Basketball Federation)	96–89	(Spanish Basketball Federation) Kosner Baskonia	Munich
20:30	Scoring by quarter: 24–19, 14–27, 22–23, 36–20
	Pts: Obst 37; Rebs: Mike 7 Asts: three players 4 PIR: Obst 38	Boxscore	Pts: Spagnolo 20; Rebs: Kurucs 7 Asts: Omoruyi 5 PIR: Spagnolo 28	Arena: SAP Garden; Attendance: 10,007; Referees: Tomislav Hordov, Joseph Bissang, Tomasz Trawicki

=== Round 21 ===
8 January 2026	Dubai Basketball (United Arab Emirates Basketball Association)	92–81	(Turkish Basketball Federation) Fenerbahçe Beko	Dubai
17:00	Scoring by quarter: 24–22, 27–20, 22–20, 19–19
	Pts: Wright 22; Rebs: Kamenjaš 15; Asts: Bacon, Wright 4 PIR: Kamenjaš 34	Boxscore	Pts: Baldwin 21; Rebs: Horton-Tucker 5 Asts: Baldwin 5 PIR: Baldwin 26	Arena: Coca-Cola Arena; Attendance: 7,029; Referees: Carlos Peruga, Miloš Koljenšić, Kristaps Konstantinovs

8 January 2026	Panathinaikos AKTOR (Hellenic Basketball Federation)	84–71	(Italian Basketball Federation) Virtus Bologna	Marousi
20:15	Scoring by quarter: 23–15, 16–18, 17–15, 28–23
	Pts: Nunn 21; Rebs: Holmes 9 Asts: Shorts 5 PIR: Holmes 24	Boxscore	Pts: Edwards 24; Rebs: Niang 7 Asts: Pajola, Taylor 4 PIR: Akele 17	Arena: Telekom Center Athens; Attendance: 18,213; Referees: Sreten Radović, Seffi Shemmesh, Amit Balak

8 January 2026	Valencia Basket (Spanish Basketball Federation)	92–101	(French Federation of Basketball) Monaco	Valencia
20:30	Scoring by quarter: 28–26, 14–27, 28–23, 22–25
	Pts: Taylor 18; Rebs: Puerto 5 Asts: Thompson 4 PIR: Thompson 22	Boxscore	Pts: Diallo 17; Rebs: Hayes 6 Asts: James 10; PIR: Nedović 21	Arena: Roig Arena; Attendance: 12,614; Referees: Robert Lottermoser, Rain Peerandi, Manuel Attard

8 January 2026	Real Madrid (Spanish Basketball Federation)	98–86	(Israeli Basketball Association) Maccabi Rapyd Tel Aviv	Madrid
20:45	Scoring by quarter: 21–25, 27–22, 28–18, 22–21
	Pts: Hezonja 16; Rebs: Tavares 11; Asts: Maledon 6 PIR: Hezonja, Tavares 20	Boxscore	Pts: DiBartolomeo 14; Rebs: Hoard 7 Asts: Sorkin 6 PIR: DiBartolomeo, Leaf 15	Arena: Movistar Arena; Attendance: 0 (Note: Real Madrid played their regular season home game against Maccabi Rapyd Tel Aviv behind closed doors for safety reasons.); Referees: Emin Moğulkoç, Ioannis Foufis, Guido Giovannetti

9 January 2026	Žalgiris (Lithuanian Basketball Federation)	99–67	(Basketball Federation of Serbia) Crvena zvezda Meridianbet	Kaunas
19:00	Scoring by quarter: 26–12, 21–16, 21–24, 31–15
	Pts: Tubelis 17; Rebs: Wright, Francisco 6 Asts: Francisco 6 PIR: Francisco 19	Boxscore	Pts: Moneke 18; Rebs: Miller-McIntyre, Ojeleye 6 Asts: Butler 5 PIR: Moneke 26	Arena: Žalgirio Arena; Attendance: 14,430; Referees: Juan Carlos García, Jordi Aliaga, Kerem Baki

9 January 2026	Olympiacos (Hellenic Basketball Federation)	95–80	(German Basketball Federation) Bayern Munich	Piraeus
20:15	Scoring by quarter: 21–23, 28–24, 24–14, 22–19
	Pts: Vezenkov 25; Rebs: Milutinov 8 Asts: Dorsey, Walkup 6 PIR: Vezenkov 35	Boxscore	Pts: Obst 21; Rebs: Mike 7 Asts: Rathan-Mayes 7 PIR: Obst 17	Arena: Peace and Friendship Stadium; Attendance: 12,122; Referees: Damir Javor, Luka Kardum, Maxime Boubert

9 January 2026	Barcelona (Spanish Basketball Federation)	88–70	(Basketball Federation of Serbia) Partizan Mozzart Bet	Barcelona
20:30	Scoring by quarter: 13–20, 28–15, 21–15, 26–20
	Pts: Hernangómez 16; Rebs: Hernangómez 8 Asts: Laprovíttola 8 PIR: Hernangómez 22	Boxscore	Pts: Washington 20; Rebs: three players 7 Asts: Washington 5 PIR: Washington 19	Arena: Palau Blaugrana; Attendance: 5,574; Referees: Mehdi Difallah, Borys Ryzhyk, Hugues Thépénier

9 January 2026	EA7 Emporio Armani Milan (Italian Basketball Federation)	87–74	(Turkish Basketball Federation) Anadolu Efes	Milan
20:30	Scoring by quarter: 16–27, 22–22, 24–8, 25–17
	Pts: Brooks 31; Rebs: Brooks 8 Asts: Gudurić 5 PIR: Brooks 32	Boxscore	Pts: Lee 19; Rebs: Jones 8 Asts: Weiler-Babb 5 PIR: Lee 20	Arena: Allianz Cloud Arena; Attendance: 5,362; Referees: Saša Pukl, Sašo Petek, Alberto Baena

9 January 2026	Kosner Baskonia (Spanish Basketball Federation)	78–73	(French Federation of Basketball) LDLC ASVEL	Vitoria-Gasteiz
20:30	Scoring by quarter: 24–19, 20–16, 14–24, 20–14
	Pts: Luwawu-Cabarrot 21; Rebs: Omoruyi 8 Asts: Forrest 4 PIR: Omoruyi 15	Boxscore	Pts: Vautier 14; Rebs: Ndiaye 7 Asts: Heurtel 5 PIR: Ndiaye 19	Arena: Buesa Arena; Attendance: 7,836; Referees: Oļegs Latiševs, Milan Nedović, Dragan Porobić

17 March 2026	Hapoel IBI Tel Aviv (Israeli Basketball Association)	93–82	(French Federation of Basketball) Paris Basketball	Sofia (Note: On March 4, 2026 the EuroLeague announced Hapoel IBI Tel Aviv would play their home matches in Bulgaria due to the inability to host matches in Israel as a result of the 2026 Iran war.)
16:00	Scoring by quarter: 24–30, 28–23, 23–16, 18–13
	Pts: Blakeney 24; Rebs: Wainright 7 Asts: Micić 9 PIR: Blakeney 25	Boxscore	Pts: Hifi 16; Rebs: Dokossi 11; Asts: Hifi 6 PIR: Dokossi, Hifi 17	Arena: Arena 8888 Sofia; Attendance: 2,164; Referees: Emilio Pérez, Alberto Baena, Vasiliki Tsaroucha
Note: Originally scheduled for 9 January 2026, the game was postponed due to inability of Paris Basketball to travel to Tel Aviv on time.

=== Round 22 ===
14 January 2026	Partizan Mozzart Bet (Basketball Federation of Serbia)	66–104	(Hellenic Basketball Federation) Olympiacos	Belgrade
20:30	Scoring by quarter: 17–20, 13–32, 13–27, 23–25
	Pts: Washington 28; Rebs: Jekiri 10; Asts: three players 3 PIR: Washington 23	Boxscore	Pts: Vezenkov 25; Rebs: three players 7 Asts: Walkup 7 PIR: Vezenkov 32	Arena: Aleksandar Nikolić Hall; Attendance: 4,503; Referees: Emin Moğulkoç, Artūras Šukys, Saulius Račys

15 January 2026	Dubai Basketball (United Arab Emirates Basketball Association)	72–80	(Italian Basketball Federation) Virtus Bologna	Dubai
17:00	Scoring by quarter: 23–23, 14–18, 16–19, 19–20
	Pts: Avramović 17; Rebs: Bacon 10; Asts: Anderson 4 PIR: Avramović 22	Boxscore	Pts: Edwards 21; Rebs: Niang 17; Asts: Edwards 4 PIR: Niang 36	Arena: Coca-Cola Arena; Attendance: 5,856; Referees: Emilio Pérez, Jakub Zamojski, Kerem Baki

15 January 2026	Anadolu Efes (Turkish Basketball Federation)	75–89	(Spanish Basketball Federation) Kosner Baskonia	Istanbul
18:30	Scoring by quarter: 20–23, 22–17, 17–18, 16–31
	Pts: Loyd 12; Rebs: Jones 6 Asts: Weiler-Babb 5 PIR: Jones 21	Boxscore	Pts: Kurucs 18; Rebs: Forrest 6 Asts: Forrest 7 PIR: Forrest 32	Arena: Turkcell Basketball Development Center; Attendance: 5,115; Referees: Sreten Radović, Milivoje Jovčić, Sérgio Silva

15 January 2026	Bayern Munich (German Basketball Federation)	85–78	(Hellenic Basketball Federation) Panathinaikos AKTOR	Munich
19:30	Scoring by quarter: 25–24, 15–19, 18–21, 27–14
	Pts: Jessup 16; Rebs: Gabriel 5 Asts: Dimitrijević, Jović 5 PIR: Jessup, Gabriel 17	Boxscore	Pts: Osman 20; Rebs: three players 4 Asts: Sloukas 5 PIR: Grant 19	Arena: SAP Garden; Attendance: 11,500; Referees: Miguel Ángel Pérez, Piotr Pastusiak, Thomas Bissuel

15 January 2026	Maccabi Rapyd Tel Aviv (Israeli Basketball Association)	100–97	(Lithuanian Basketball Federation) Žalgiris	Tel Aviv
20:05	Scoring by quarter: 27–24, 25–25, 26–22, 22–26
	Pts: three players 17; Rebs: Leaf 7 Asts: Blatt, Clark 5 PIR: Leaf 23	Boxscore	Pts: Francisco 22; Rebs: Wright 11; Asts: Francisco 6 PIR: Francisco 25	Arena: Menora Mivtachim Arena; Attendance: 10,228; Referees: Robert Lottermoser, Rain Peerandi, Anne Panther

15 January 2026	EA7 Emporio Armani Milan (Italian Basketball Federation)	96–104	(Basketball Federation of Serbia) Crvena zvezda Meridianbet	Milan
20:30	Scoring by quarter: 25–27, 30–17, 27–26, 14–34
	Pts: Shields 22; Rebs: LeDay 7 Asts: Brown 5 PIR: Nebo 20	Boxscore	Pts: Nwora 22; Rebs: Miller-McIntyre 8 Asts: Miller-McIntyre 7 PIR: Miller-McIntyre 24	Arena: Allianz Cloud Arena; Attendance: 3,900; Referees: Carlos Peruga, Borys Ryzhyk, Luka Kardum

15 January 2026	Paris Basketball (French Federation of Basketball)	87–95	(French Federation of Basketball) Monaco	Paris
20:45	Scoring by quarter: 23–27, 20–25, 21–24, 23–19
	Pts: Hifi 19; Rebs: Faye 10; Asts: Hifi 4 PIR: Faye 19	Boxscore	Pts: James 23; Rebs: Mirotić 9 Asts: James 4 PIR: James 27	Arena: Adidas Arena; Attendance: 6,697; Referees: Saša Pukl, Carlos Cortés, Robert Vyklický

16 January 2026	Fenerbahçe Beko (Turkish Basketball Federation)	82–79	(Spanish Basketball Federation) Valencia Basket	Istanbul
18:45	Scoring by quarter: 28–20, 17–14, 21–24, 16–21
	Pts: de Colo 16; Rebs: Jantunen 6 Asts: Biberović 5 PIR: Baldwin 20	Boxscore	Pts: Reuvers 17; Rebs: Taylor 8 Asts: Montero 5 PIR: Reuvers 20	Arena: Ülker Sports and Event Hall; Attendance: 11,731; Referees: Ilija Belošević, Oļegs Latiševs, Marcin Kowalski

16 January 2026	LDLC ASVEL (French Federation of Basketball)	73–81	(Israeli Basketball Association) Hapoel IBI Tel Aviv	Décines-Charpieu
20:00	Scoring by quarter: 16–16, 22–15, 20–26, 15–24
	Pts: Watson 17; Rebs: Ndiaye 7 Asts: Watson 5 PIR: Ajinça 16	Boxscore	Pts: Oturu 18; Rebs: Oturu 7 Asts: Bryant 6 PIR: Bryant 27	Arena: LDLC Arena; Attendance: 7,322; Referees: Juan Carlos García, Tomasz Trawicki, Eduard Udyanskyy

16 January 2026	Real Madrid (Spanish Basketball Federation)	80–61	(Spanish Basketball Federation) Barcelona	Madrid
20:45	Scoring by quarter: 21–14, 22–17, 20–16, 17–14
	Pts: Garuba 16; Rebs: Okeke 8 Asts: Campazzo 5 PIR: Tavares 20	Boxscore	Pts: Brizuela 13; Rebs: Parra 7 Asts: Shengelia, Laprovíttola 3 PIR: Shengelia 12	Arena: Movistar Arena; Attendance: 12,156; Referees: Damir Javor, Tomislav Hordov, Gytis Vilius

=== Round 23 ===
20 January 2026	Olympiacos (Hellenic Basketball Federation)	100–93	(Israeli Basketball Association) Maccabi Rapyd Tel Aviv	Piraeus
16:30	Scoring by quarter: 27–24, 31–10, 18–28, 24–31
	Pts: Vezenkov 28; Rebs: Milutinov 9 Asts: Fournier 9 PIR: Vezenkov 32	Boxscore	Pts: Sorkin 21; Rebs: Hoard 6 Asts: Lundberg 7 PIR: Sorkin 21	Arena: Peace and Friendship Stadium; Attendance: 12,727; Referees: Tomislav Hordov, Miloš Koljenšić, Josip Radojković

20 January 2026	Hapoel IBI Tel Aviv (Israeli Basketball Association)	71–66	(Turkish Basketball Federation) Anadolu Efes	Sofia (Note: Hapoel Tel Aviv's home game against Anadolu Efes was relocated to Bulgaria on recommendation of both Turkish and Israeli governments regarding the Gaza war.)
18:30	Scoring by quarter: 14–19, 19–24, 17–10, 21–13
	Pts: Jones 16; Rebs: Oturu 10; Asts: Jones 4 PIR: Bryant 23	Boxscore	Pts: Lee 20; Rebs: Osmani 7 Asts: three players 3 PIR: Lee 22	Arena: Arena 8888 Sofia; Attendance: 3,128; Referees: Robert Lottermoser, Piotr Pastusiak, Michele Rossi

20 January 2026	Monaco (French Federation of Basketball)	96–100(OT)	(Basketball Federation of Serbia) Crvena zvezda Meridianbet	Fontvieille
18:45	Scoring by quarter: 21–27, 23–23, 27–18, 19–22, Overtime: 6–10
	Pts: Diallo 19; Rebs: Theis 8 Asts: James, Okobo 7 PIR: Diallo 23	Boxscore	Pts: Izundu 22; Rebs: Izundu 12; Asts: Miller-McIntyre 11; PIR: Izundu 36	Arena: Salle Gaston Médecin; Attendance: 4,066; Referees: Miguel Ángel Pérez, Emilio Pérez, Sérgio Silva

20 January 2026	LDLC ASVEL (French Federation of Basketball)	77–96	(Lithuanian Basketball Federation) Žalgiris	Villeurbanne
20:00	Scoring by quarter: 18–23, 23–22, 14–30, 22–21
	Pts: Heurtel 21; Rebs: Massa 6 Asts: Heurtel 6 PIR: Heurtel 24	Boxscore	Pts: Francisco 20; Rebs: Wright 7 Asts: Francisco, Butkevičius 4 PIR: Wright 28	Arena: Astroballe; Attendance: 4,637; Referees: Carlos Peruga, Milivoje Jovčić, Stefan Ćalić

20 January 2026	Panathinaikos AKTOR (Hellenic Basketball Federation)	93–74	(Spanish Basketball Federation) Kosner Baskonia	Marousi
20:15	Scoring by quarter: 26–14, 22–17, 25–23, 20–20
	Pts: Toliopoulos 21; Rebs: Faried, Holmes 6 Asts: Sloukas, Toliopoulos 5 PIR: Toliopoulos 21	Boxscore	Pts: Luwawu-Cabarrot 17; Rebs: Diop 10; Asts: Simmons 6 PIR: Simmons 16	Arena: Telekom Center Athens; Attendance: 15,603; Referees: Mehdi Difallah, Rain Peerandi, Kristaps Konstantinovs

20 January 2026	Bayern Munich (German Basketball Federation)	63–67	(Basketball Federation of Serbia) Partizan Mozzart Bet	Munich
20:30	Scoring by quarter: 7–18, 25–16, 18–16, 13–17
	Pts: Gabriel 13; Rebs: Lučić, Gabriel 6 Asts: Hollatz 5 PIR: Gabriel 19	Boxscore	Pts: Payne 16; Rebs: Jekiri 8 Asts: Payne, Calathes 6 PIR: Payne 18	Arena: SAP Garden; Attendance: 10,469; Referees: Carlos Cortés, Gytis Vilius, Alberto Baena

20 January 2026	Valencia Basket (Spanish Basketball Federation)	98–84	(French Federation of Basketball) Paris Basketball	Valencia
20:30	Scoring by quarter: 27–16, 23–26, 20–11, 28–31
	Pts: Taylor 28; Rebs: Sako 9 Asts: Montero 8 PIR: Taylor 33	Boxscore	Pts: Robinson 14; Rebs: Cavalière, Dokossi 6 Asts: Robinson 9 PIR: Robinson 17	Arena: Roig Arena; Attendance: 11,859; Referees: Damir Javor, Jakub Zamojski, Adar Peer

20 January 2026	Barcelona (Spanish Basketball Federation)	91–89	(United Arab Emirates Basketball Association) Dubai Basketball	Barcelona
20:30	Scoring by quarter: 18–22, 31–19, 30–26, 12–22
	Pts: Brizuela 25; Rebs: Parra 6 Asts: Satoranský 5 PIR: Punter 26	Boxscore	Pts: Wright 29; Rebs: Kabengele 4 Asts: Wright, Bacon 5 PIR: Wright 30	Arena: Palau Blaugrana; Attendance: 5,251; Referees: Saša Pukl, Seffi Shemmesh, Maxime Boubert

20 January 2026	Real Madrid (Spanish Basketball Federation)	106–77	(Italian Basketball Federation) EA7 Emporio Armani Milan	Madrid
20:45	Scoring by quarter: 30–23, 24–13, 24–19, 28–22
	Pts: Lyles 17; Rebs: three players 5 Asts: Maledon 7 PIR: Lyles 25	Boxscore	Pts: Gudurić 15; Rebs: Brooks, Nebo 4 Asts: Brown 3 PIR: Gudurić 15	Arena: Movistar Arena; Attendance: 7,513; Referees: Sreten Radović, Artūras Šukys, Vasiliki Tsaroucha

21 January 2026	Virtus Bologna (Italian Basketball Federation)	80–85	(Turkish Basketball Federation) Fenerbahçe Beko	Bologna
20:30	Scoring by quarter: 25–22, 22–18, 13–25, 20–20
	Pts: Edwards 35; Rebs: Niang 7 Asts: Pajola 5 PIR: Edwards 30	Boxscore	Pts: Horton-Tucker 28; Rebs: Biberović, Hall 6 Asts: Horton-Tucker, Melli 3 PIR: Horton-Tucker 28	Arena: Virtus Arena; Attendance: 8,012; Referees: Juan Carlos García, Saulius Račys, Sašo Petek

=== Round 24 ===
22 January 2026	Anadolu Efes (Turkish Basketball Federation)	68–74	(Hellenic Basketball Federation) Olympiacos	Istanbul
18:30	Scoring by quarter: 13–25, 18–23, 20–10, 17–16
	Pts: Dozier 16; Rebs: Osmani, Jones 7 Asts: Weiler-Babb 6 PIR: Lee 17	Boxscore	Pts: Vezenkov 19; Rebs: Hall 7 Asts: Walkup 9 PIR: Vezenkov 20	Arena: Turkcell Basketball Development Center; Attendance: 9,792; Referees: Ilija Belošević, Jordi Aliaga, Hugues Thépénier

22 January 2026	Maccabi Rapyd Tel Aviv (Israeli Basketball Association)	75–71	(Hellenic Basketball Federation) Panathinaikos AKTOR	Tel Aviv
20:05	Scoring by quarter: 20–21, 22–18, 17–21, 16–11
	Pts: Lundberg 16; Rebs: Sorkin 8 Asts: Blatt, Sorkin 3 PIR: Sorkin 16	Boxscore	Pts: Grant 14; Rebs: Hernangómez 13; Asts: Shorts 7 PIR: Shorts 18	Arena: Menora Mivtachim Arena; Attendance: 10,353; Referees: Oļegs Latiševs, Joseph Bissang, Steve Bittner

22 January 2026	EA7 Emporio Armani Milan (Italian Basketball Federation)	82–86	(Lithuanian Basketball Federation) Žalgiris	Milan
20:30	Scoring by quarter: 22–19, 22–26, 23–17, 15–24
	Pts: Shields 27; Rebs: Nebo 11; Asts: Ellis, Shields 4 PIR: Shields 29	Boxscore	Pts: Francisco 25; Rebs: Wright 6 Asts: Francisco 6 PIR: Francisco 21	Arena: Allianz Cloud Arena; Attendance: 4,986; Referees: Mehdi Difallah, Tomasz Trawicki, Thomas Bissuel

22 January 2026	Bayern Munich (German Basketball Federation)	93–89	(Spanish Basketball Federation) Valencia Basket	Munich
20:30	Scoring by quarter: 22–24, 31–20, 26–26, 14–19
	Pts: Lučić 19; Rebs: Mike 6 Asts: Dimitrijević 7 PIR: Lučić 26	Boxscore	Pts: Taylor 20; Rebs: Costello 7 Asts: Montero 8 PIR: Taylor 22	Arena: SAP Garden; Attendance: 11,051; Referees: Saša Pukl, Igor Dragojević, Amit Balak

22 January 2026	Real Madrid (Spanish Basketball Federation)	90–78	(French Federation of Basketball) Monaco	Madrid
20:45	Scoring by quarter: 23–13, 31–18, 17–22, 19–25
	Pts: Lyles 20; Rebs: Tavares 10; Asts: Campazzo 10; PIR: Campazzo 28	Boxscore	Pts: James 17; Rebs: James, Mirotić 6 Asts: James 7 PIR: James 19	Arena: Movistar Arena; Attendance: 10,116; Referees: Milan Nedović, Marcin Kowalski, Luka Kardum

22 January 2026	Paris Basketball (French Federation of Basketball)	79–99	(United Arab Emirates Basketball Association) Dubai Basketball	Paris
21:00	Scoring by quarter: 18–27, 14–25, 23–22, 24–25
	Pts: Rhoden 19; Rebs: Cavalière, Faye 6 Asts: Robinson 5 PIR: Rhoden 19	Boxscore	Pts: Petrušev 21; Rebs: Petrušev 9 Asts: Avramović 7 PIR: Petrušev 33	Arena: Adidas Arena; Attendance: 5,852; Referees: Borys Ryzhyk, Ioannis Foufis, Gentian Cici

23 January 2026	Fenerbahçe Beko (Turkish Basketball Federation)	84–71	(Spanish Basketball Federation) Kosner Baskonia	Istanbul
18:45	Scoring by quarter: 21–20, 21–18, 27–12, 15–21
	Pts: Horton-Tucker 21; Rebs: Horton-Tucker 8 Asts: Bacot 3 PIR: Horton-Tucker 22	Boxscore	Pts: Omoruyi 14; Rebs: Omoruyi 6 Asts: Forrest 3 PIR: Omoruyi 21	Arena: Ülker Sports and Event Hall; Attendance: 11,370; Referees: Tomislav Hordov, Gytis Vilius, Robert Vyklický

23 January 2026	Virtus Bologna (Italian Basketball Federation)	93–102	(Basketball Federation of Serbia) Crvena zvezda Meridianbet	Bologna
20:30	Scoring by quarter: 26–31, 26–26, 16–25, 25–20
	Pts: Diouf 21; Rebs: Diouf 9 Asts: Pajola 7 PIR: Diouf 31	Boxscore	Pts: Butler 16; Rebs: Izundu 10; Asts: Miller-McIntyre 12; PIR: Miller-McIntyre 21	Arena: Virtus Arena; Attendance: 8,884; Referees: Emin Moğulkoç, Alberto Baena, Maxime Boubert

23 January 2026	Partizan Mozzart Bet (Basketball Federation of Serbia)	104–101(OT)	(Israeli Basketball Association) Hapoel IBI Tel Aviv	Munich (Note: Partizan's home game against Hapoel Tel Aviv was relocated to Germany due to unavailability of the hosts' regular venue, the Belgrade Arena.)
20:30	Scoring by quarter: 17–27, 18–29, 28–17, 25–15, Overtime: 16–13
	Pts: Payne 19; Rebs: Bonga 9 Asts: Calathes 8 PIR: Fernando 25	Boxscore	Pts: Oturu 24; Rebs: Wainright 5 Asts: Micić 9 PIR: Oturu 23	Arena: BMW Park; Attendance: 1,093; Referees: Carlos Peruga, Rain Peerandi, Kristaps Konstantinovs

23 January 2026	LDLC ASVEL (French Federation of Basketball)	91–98	(Spanish Basketball Federation) Barcelona	Villeurbanne
20:45	Scoring by quarter: 26–22, 23–25, 21–27, 21–24
	Pts: Watson 23; Rebs: Ndiaye 6 Asts: Angola 5 PIR: Angola 27	Boxscore	Pts: Punter 31; Rebs: Shengelia 5 Asts: Satoranský 5 PIR: Punter 34	Arena: Astroballe; Attendance: 5,560; Referees: Artūras Šukys, Saulius Račys, Manuel Attard

=== Round 25 ===
27 January 2026	Paris Basketball (French Federation of Basketball)	98–92	(Spanish Basketball Federation) Real Madrid	Paris
20:45	Scoring by quarter: 24–18, 26–24, 25–24, 23–26
	Pts: Hifi 21; Rebs: Faye 7 Asts: Robinson 5 PIR: M'Baye, Hifi 17	Boxscore	Pts: Lyles 21; Rebs: Hezonja 7 Asts: Campazzo 7 PIR: Lyles, Hezonja 19	Arena: Adidas Arena; Attendance: 7,871; Referees: Oļegs Latiševs, Miloš Koljenšić, Anne Panther

29 January 2026	Fenerbahçe Beko (Turkish Basketball Federation)	79–62	(Turkish Basketball Federation) Anadolu Efes	Istanbul
18:45	Scoring by quarter: 25–8, 14–17, 22–14, 18–23
	Pts: Horton-Tucker 22; Rebs: Melli 7 Asts: Baldwin 9 PIR: Horton-Tucker 27	Boxscore	Pts: Lee 19; Rebs: three players 4 Asts: Hazer 4 PIR: Lee 15	Arena: Ülker Sports and Event Hall; Attendance: 11,965; Referees: Carlos Peruga, Borys Ryzhyk, Tomasz Trawicki

29 January 2026	Hapoel IBI Tel Aviv (Israeli Basketball Association)	64–79	(German Basketball Federation) Bayern Munich	Tel Aviv
19:00	Scoring by quarter: 26–23, 13–20, 11–18, 14–18
	Pts: Micić 13; Rebs: Malcolm 7 Asts: Micić 5 PIR: Micić 14	Boxscore	Pts: Mike 16; Rebs: Lučić 6 Asts: Hollatz 4 PIR: Mike 21	Arena: Menora Mivtachim Arena; Attendance: 7,000; Referees: Emilio Pérez, Luka Kardum, Sérgio Silva

29 January 2026	Olympiacos (Hellenic Basketball Federation)	87–75	(Spanish Basketball Federation) Barcelona	Piraeus
20:15	Scoring by quarter: 27–13, 19–24, 13–27, 28–11
	Pts: Vezenkov 20; Rebs: Vezenkov 11; Asts: Ward 5 PIR: Jones 29	Boxscore	Pts: Punter 15; Rebs: Shengelia 8 Asts: Satoranský 5 PIR: Clyburn 15	Arena: Peace and Friendship Stadium; Attendance: 12,737; Referees: Sreten Radović, Piotr Pastusiak, Kristaps Konstantinovs

29 January 2026	EA7 Emporio Armani Milan (Italian Basketball Federation)	85–79	(Basketball Federation of Serbia) Partizan Mozzart Bet	Milan
20:30	Scoring by quarter: 25–22, 27–21, 17–14, 16–22
	Pts: LeDay 20; Rebs: Ellis 5 Asts: Gudurić 6 PIR: Nebo, LeDay 19	Boxscore	Pts: Brown 17; Rebs: Jekiri 6 Asts: Calathes 7 PIR: Brown, Osetkowski 18	Arena: Allianz Cloud Arena; Attendance: 3,760; Referees: Robert Lottermoser, Saulius Račys, Marcin Kowalski

29 January 2026	Valencia Basket (Spanish Basketball Federation)	94–83	(Israeli Basketball Association) Maccabi Rapyd Tel Aviv	Valencia
20:45	Scoring by quarter: 21–27, 23–23, 22–18, 28–15
	Pts: Montero 19; Rebs: Sako 8 Asts: Taylor 5 PIR: Sako 24	Boxscore	Pts: Leaf 14; Rebs: three players 5 Asts: Blatt 4 PIR: Leaf 18	Arena: Roig Arena; Attendance: 7,994; Referees: Milan Nedović, Artūras Šukys, Gentian Cici

30 January 2026	Monaco (French Federation of Basketball)	82–84	(Italian Basketball Federation) Virtus Bologna	Fontvieille
19:30	Scoring by quarter: 30–22, 21–22, 14–18, 17–22
	Pts: James 17; Rebs: Diallo 7 Asts: James 9 PIR: Strazel, James 19	Boxscore	Pts: Alston 19; Rebs: Akele 7 Asts: Morgan, Vildoza 4 PIR: Akele 19	Arena: Salle Gaston Médecin; Attendance: 4,566; Referees: Tomislav Hordov, Jakub Zamojski, Steve Bittner

30 January 2026	Crvena zvezda Meridianbet (Basketball Federation of Serbia)	95–92	(United Arab Emirates Basketball Association) Dubai Basketball	Belgrade
20:00	Scoring by quarter: 34–14, 10–27, 24–20, 27–31
	Pts: Nwora 22; Rebs: Izundu 8 Asts: Miller-McIntyre 7 PIR: Izundu 25	Boxscore	Pts: Kabengele 24; Rebs: Kabengele 8 Asts: Kabengele 5 PIR: Kabengele 40	Arena: Belgrade Arena; Attendance: 16,539; Referees: Juan Carlos García, Carlos Cortés, Thomas Bissuel

30 January 2026	Kosner Baskonia (Spanish Basketball Federation)	102–91	(Lithuanian Basketball Federation) Žalgiris	Vitoria-Gasteiz
20:30	Scoring by quarter: 19–23, 27–22, 29–26, 27–20
	Pts: Luwawu-Cabarrot 19; Rebs: Diakite, Kurucs 7 Asts: Luwawu-Cabarrot 4 PIR: Kurucs 21	Boxscore	Pts: Francisco 30; Rebs: Wright 7 Asts: Francisco, Brazdeikis 5 PIR: Francisco 29	Arena: Buesa Arena; Attendance: 8,415; Referees: Saša Pukl, Seffi Shemmesh, Josip Radojković

30 January 2026	LDLC ASVEL (French Federation of Basketball)	78–79	(Hellenic Basketball Federation) Panathinaikos AKTOR	Décines-Charpieu
20:45	Scoring by quarter: 17–15, 12–20, 17–20, 32–24
	Pts: Angola 20; Rebs: Ajinça 6 Asts: Heurtel 12; PIR: Angola 28	Boxscore	Pts: Sloukas 26; Rebs: Holmes 9 Asts: Sloukas 9 PIR: Sloukas 36	Arena: LDLC Arena; Attendance: 8,789; Referees: Emin Moğulkoç, Gytis Vilius, Sašo Petek

=== Round 26 ===
3 February 2026	Dubai Basketball (United Arab Emirates Basketball Association)	108–98(OT)	(Hellenic Basketball Federation) Olympiacos	Dubai
17:00	Scoring by quarter: 26–17, 26–23, 22–30, 21–25, Overtime: 13–3
	Pts: Bacon, Kabengele 21; Rebs: Kabengele 14; Asts: Wright 7 PIR: Kabengele 30	Boxscore	Pts: Dorsey 18; Rebs: Milutinov 6 Asts: Walkup 7 PIR: Milutinov 21	Arena: Coca-Cola Arena; Attendance: 6,498; Referees: Emilio Pérez, Gytis Vilius, Manuel Attard

3 February 2026	Anadolu Efes (Turkish Basketball Federation)	107–90	(Spanish Basketball Federation) Valencia Basket	Istanbul
18:30	Scoring by quarter: 33–14, 24–32, 27–18, 23–26
	Pts: Osmani 20; Rebs: Jones, Osmani 7 Asts: Dozier 7 PIR: Osmani 27	Boxscore	Pts: Reuvers 30; Rebs: Sako 7 Asts: Montero 8 PIR: Reuvers 30	Arena: Turkcell Basketball Development Center; Attendance: 3,578; Referees: Tomislav Hordov, Marcin Kowalski, Thomas Bissuel

3 February 2026	Žalgiris (Lithuanian Basketball Federation)	104–87	(French Federation of Basketball) Monaco	Kaunas
19:00	Scoring by quarter: 35–18, 21–20, 20–22, 28–27
	Pts: Tubelis 26; Rebs: Tubelis, Wright 7 Asts: Francisco 8 PIR: Tubelis 27	Boxscore	Pts: James 19; Rebs: Diallo 8 Asts: James 10; PIR: Diallo, James 25	Arena: Žalgirio Arena; Attendance: 14,582; Referees: Juan Carlos García, Carlos Cortés, Eduard Udyanskyy

3 February 2026	Crvena zvezda Meridianbet (Basketball Federation of Serbia)	87–75	(Israeli Basketball Association) Hapoel IBI Tel Aviv	Belgrade
20:00	Scoring by quarter: 25–21, 24–24, 13–24, 25–6
	Pts: Nwora 22; Rebs: Ojeleye 9 Asts: Miller-McIntyre 9 PIR: Nwora 23	Boxscore	Pts: Jones 16; Rebs: Motley 5 Asts: Malcolm, Motley 4 PIR: Malcolm 16	Arena: Belgrade Arena; Attendance: 18,536; Referees: Oļegs Latiševs, Saulius Račys, Tomasz Trawicki

3 February 2026	Maccabi Rapyd Tel Aviv (Israeli Basketball Association)	95–93	(Basketball Federation of Serbia) Partizan Mozzart Bet	Tel Aviv
20:05	Scoring by quarter: 27–22, 21–28, 24–27, 23–16
	Pts: Clark, Lundberg 21; Rebs: Hoard 5 Asts: Lundberg 5 PIR: Lundberg 27	Boxscore	Pts: Brown 19; Rebs: Fernando 7 Asts: Payne 6 PIR: Fernando 29	Arena: Menora Mivtachim Arena; Attendance: 9,072; Referees: Miguel Ángel Pérez, Ioannis Foufis, Robert Vyklický

3 February 2026	Panathinaikos AKTOR (Hellenic Basketball Federation)	82–81	(Spanish Basketball Federation) Real Madrid	Marousi
20:15	Scoring by quarter: 16–26, 20–18, 24–17, 22–20
	Pts: Sloukas 22; Rebs: Faried, Hernangómez 6 Asts: Grant 7 PIR: Sloukas 27	Boxscore	Pts: Len 18; Rebs: Tavares 6 Asts: Campazzo, Lyles 5 PIR: Len 27	Arena: Telekom Center Athens; Attendance: 18,999; Referees: Ilija Belošević, Milivoje Jovčić, Jakub Zamojski

3 February 2026	Bayern Munich (German Basketball Federation)	81–75	(French Federation of Basketball) Paris Basketball	Munich
20:30	Scoring by quarter: 21–18, 13–13, 18–18, 29–26
	Pts: Obst 26; Rebs: Gabriel 8 Asts: Hollatz, Jović 5 PIR: Gabriel 24	Boxscore	Pts: Hifi 17; Rebs: Faye 6 Asts: Hifi 5 PIR: Hifi 23	Arena: SAP Garden; Attendance: 10,596; Referees: Sreten Radović, Milan Nedović, Hüseyin Çelik

3 February 2026	Barcelona (Spanish Basketball Federation)	78–82	(Turkish Basketball Federation) Fenerbahçe Beko	Barcelona
20:30	Scoring by quarter: 14–29, 27–24, 15–20, 22–9
	Pts: Punter 24; Rebs: Veselý 7 Asts: Satoranský 7 PIR: Punter 23	Boxscore	Pts: Biberović 19; Rebs: Birch 8 Asts: Baldwin 7 PIR: Baldwin 26	Arena: Palau Blaugrana; Attendance: 6,397; Referees: Robert Lottermoser, Luka Kardum, Uros Obrknezevic

3 February 2026	EA7 Emporio Armani Milan (Italian Basketball Federation)	109–89	(Spanish Basketball Federation) Kosner Baskonia	Milan
20:30	Scoring by quarter: 32–29, 25–27, 27–15, 25–18
	Pts: Booker 21; Rebs: Booker 5 Asts: Gudurić, Mannion 6 PIR: Booker 28	Boxscore	Pts: Howard 21; Rebs: Diop 5 Asts: Forrest, Howard 4 PIR: Howard 26	Arena: Allianz Cloud Arena; Attendance: 3,339; Referees: Emin Moğulkoç, Borys Ryzhyk, Steve Bittner

4 February 2026	Virtus Bologna (Italian Basketball Federation)	70–80	(French Federation of Basketball) LDLC ASVEL	Bologna
20:30	Scoring by quarter: 17–21, 16–22, 21–12, 16–25
	Pts: Edwards 20; Rebs: three players 4 Asts: Edwards, Vildoza 4 PIR: Edwards 14	Boxscore	Pts: Watson 19; Rebs: Ndiaye 8 Asts: Angola, Watson 5 PIR: Watson 22	Arena: Virtus Arena; Attendance: 6,141; Referees: Saša Pukl, Rain Peerandi, Amit Balak

=== Round 27 ===
5 February 2026	Dubai Basketball (United Arab Emirates Basketball Association)	93–85	(Spanish Basketball Federation) Real Madrid	Dubai
17:00	Scoring by quarter: 11–19, 26–25, 32–24, 24–17
	Pts: Musa 20; Rebs: Petrušev 6 Asts: Avramović 7 PIR: Musa 25	Boxscore	Pts: Campazzo 24; Rebs: Tavares 9 Asts: Hezonja 5 PIR: Tavares 25	Arena: Coca-Cola Arena; Attendance: 7,648; Referees: Tomislav Hordov, Piotr Pastusiak, Saulius Račys

5 February 2026	Hapoel IBI Tel Aviv (Israeli Basketball Association)	99–104(OT)	(Spanish Basketball Federation) Valencia Basket	Tel Aviv
20:00	Scoring by quarter: 21–24, 28–12, 24–25, 15–27, Overtime: 11–16
	Pts: Blakeney 23; Rebs: Odiase, Oturu 6 Asts: Jones 7 PIR: three players 19	Boxscore	Pts: Montero 29; Rebs: Taylor 10; Asts: Montero 8 PIR: Montero 38	Arena: Menora Mivtachim Arena; Attendance: 6,500; Referees: Ilija Belošević, Jakub Zamojski, Stefan Ćalić

5 February 2026	Partizan Mozzart Bet (Basketball Federation of Serbia)	78–62	(Hellenic Basketball Federation) Panathinaikos AKTOR	Belgrade
20:30	Scoring by quarter: 20–19, 25–14, 21–9, 12–20
	Pts: Payne 18; Rebs: Bonga 6 Asts: Brown, Payne 5 PIR: Brown, Bonga 22	Boxscore	Pts: Shorts 21; Rebs: Hernangómez 8 Asts: Sloukas 3 PIR: Shorts 24	Arena: Belgrade Arena; Attendance: 13,716; Referees: Emilio Pérez, Artūras Šukys, Maxime Boubert

5 February 2026	Bayern Munich (German Basketball Federation)	91–82	(French Federation of Basketball) Monaco	Munich
20:30	Scoring by quarter: 24–23, 24–16, 20–24, 23–19
	Pts: Obst 19; Rebs: Gabriel 8 Asts: Jović 5 PIR: Obst 19	Boxscore	Pts: James 30; Rebs: Blossomgame 7 Asts: James, Okobo 4 PIR: James 29	Arena: SAP Garden; Attendance: 10,251; Referees: Carlos Peruga, Miloš Koljenšić, Josip Radojković

5 February 2026	Paris Basketball (French Federation of Basketball)	90–92	(Turkish Basketball Federation) Fenerbahçe Beko	Paris
20:45	Scoring by quarter: 23–21, 22–19, 23–22, 22–30
	Pts: Hifi 23; Rebs: Cavalière 5 Asts: Hifi 4 PIR: Hifi 20	Boxscore	Pts: Biberović 19; Rebs: four players 4 Asts: Baldwin, Horton-Tucker 6 PIR: Biberović 21	Arena: Adidas Arena; Attendance: 7,529; Referees: Miguel Ángel Pérez, Carlos Cortés, Leandro Lezcano

6 February 2026	Anadolu Efes (Turkish Basketball Federation)	92–82	(Lithuanian Basketball Federation) Žalgiris	Istanbul
18:30	Scoring by quarter: 25–24, 22–21, 18–22, 27–15
	Pts: Loyd 19; Rebs: Jones 6 Asts: Lee 8 PIR: Loyd 27	Boxscore	Pts: Tubelis 22; Rebs: three players 5 Asts: Francisco 5 PIR: Tubelis 26	Arena: Turkcell Basketball Development Center; Attendance: 5,119; Referees: Damir Javor, Joseph Bissang, Vasiliki Tsaroucha

6 February 2026	LDLC ASVEL (French Federation of Basketball)	76–77	(Italian Basketball Federation) EA7 Emporio Armani Milan	Décines-Charpieu
20:00	Scoring by quarter: 22–20, 15–22, 16–25, 23–10
	Pts: Angola 23; Rebs: Traoré 7 Asts: Heurtel 4 PIR: Angola 18	Boxscore	Pts: Gudurić 18; Rebs: Brooks 10; Asts: Gudurić 7 PIR: Gudurić 23	Arena: LDLC Arena; Attendance: 8,581; Referees: Juan Carlos García, Sérgio Silva, Alberto Baena

6 February 2026	Crvena zvezda Meridianbet (Basketball Federation of Serbia)	82–83	(Israeli Basketball Association) Maccabi Rapyd Tel Aviv	Belgrade
20:00	Scoring by quarter: 21–23, 19–26, 27–16, 15–18
	Pts: Nwora 22; Rebs: Bolomboy, Moneke 6 Asts: Miller-McIntyre 8 PIR: Moneke 21	Boxscore	Pts: Clark 22; Rebs: Brissett, Sorkin 8 Asts: Blatt, Lundberg 3 PIR: Hoard 24	Arena: Belgrade Arena; Attendance: 20,127; Referees: Robert Lottermoser, Kristaps Konstantinovs, Michele Rossi

6 February 2026	Olympiacos (Hellenic Basketball Federation)	109–77	(Italian Basketball Federation) Virtus Bologna	Piraeus
20:15	Scoring by quarter: 24–23, 37–11, 28–16, 20–27
	Pts: Vezenkov 20; Rebs: Vezenkov 8 Asts: Walkup 8 PIR: Vezekov 31	Boxscore	Pts: Alston 16; Rebs: Niang 4 Asts: Alston 4 PIR: Alston 15	Arena: Peace and Friendship Stadium; Attendance: 12,716; Referees: Milan Nedović, Jordi Aliaga, Sašo Petek

6 February 2026	Kosner Baskonia (Spanish Basketball Federation)	91–97	(Spanish Basketball Federation) Barcelona	Vitoria-Gasteiz
20:30	Scoring by quarter: 27–17, 24–31, 17–28, 23–21
	Pts: Diakite 16; Rebs: Diakite 5 Asts: Luwawu-Cabarrot 5 PIR: Diakite 21	Boxscore	Pts: Parra, Shengelia 16; Rebs: Parra, Veselý 6 Asts: three players 4 PIR: Parra 25	Arena: Buesa Arena; Attendance: 10,066; Referees: Mehdi Difallah, Oļegs Latiševs, Guido Giovannetti

=== Round 28 ===
12 February 2026	Anadolu Efes (Turkish Basketball Federation)	91–60	(Italian Basketball Federation) Virtus Bologna	Istanbul
18:30	Scoring by quarter: 22–19, 21–16, 21–10, 27–15
	Pts: Swider 22; Rebs: Osmani 7 Asts: Weiler-Babb 9 PIR: Swider 27	Boxscore	Pts: Smailagić, Morgan 12; Rebs: Jallow 8 Asts: Vildoza 4 PIR: Smailagić, Diouf 12	Arena: Turkcell Basketball Development Center; Attendance: 5,158; Referees: Emilio Pérez, Piotr Pastusiak, Christian Theis

12 February 2026	Maccabi Rapyd Tel Aviv (Israeli Basketball Association)	111–106(OT)	(German Basketball Federation) Bayern Munich	Tel Aviv
20:05	Scoring by quarter: 26–20, 25–25, 23–33, 25–21, Overtime: 12–7
	Pts: Sorkin 21; Rebs: Hoard 11; Asts: Blatt 9 PIR: Blatt 31	Boxscore	Pts: Obst 33; Rebs: McCormack 8 Asts: Dimitrijević 10; PIR: Obst, Dimitrijević 25	Arena: Menora Mivtachim Arena; Attendance: 10,369; Referees: Saša Pukl, Carlos Cortés, Mario Majkić

12 February 2026	Olympiacos (Hellenic Basketball Federation)	92–86	(Basketball Federation of Serbia) Crvena zvezda Meridianbet	Piraeus
20:15	Scoring by quarter: 24–20, 25–25, 23–23, 20–18
	Pts: Vezenkov 23; Rebs: Vezenkov 8 Asts: Walkup 10; PIR: Vezenkov 25	Boxscore	Pts: Nwora 21; Rebs: Moneke 8 Asts: Miller-McIntyre 8 PIR: Nwora 18	Arena: Peace and Friendship Stadium; Attendance: 12,633; Referees: Miguel Ángel Pérez, Seffi Shemmesh, Maxime Boubert

12 February 2026	Barcelona (Spanish Basketball Federation)	74–85	(French Federation of Basketball) Paris Basketball	Barcelona
20:30	Scoring by quarter: 18–21, 25–18, 12–28, 19–18
	Pts: Brizuela 15; Rebs: Norris 9 Asts: Marcos 5 PIR: Shengelia 19	Boxscore	Pts: Hifi 21; Rebs: Dokossi 9 Asts: three players 3 PIR: Hifi 20	Arena: Palau Blaugrana; Attendance: 4,368; Referees: Tomislav Hordov, Saulius Račys, Ioannis Tiganis

12 February 2026	Valencia Basket (Spanish Basketball Federation)	82–67	(French Federation of Basketball) LDLC ASVEL	Valencia
20:30	Scoring by quarter: 22–17, 22–16, 19–12, 19–22
	Pts: Montero, Thompson 14; Rebs: three players 4 Asts: three players 3 PIR: Sako 16	Boxscore	Pts: Jackson 20; Rebs: Eboua 8 Asts: Harrison 7 PIR: Eboua 15	Arena: Roig Arena; Attendance: 13,210; Referees: Damir Javor, Miloš Koljenšić, Vassilis Pitsilkas

13 February 2026	Žalgiris (Lithuanian Basketball Federation)	93–82	(Israeli Basketball Association) Hapoel IBI Tel Aviv	Kaunas
19:00	Scoring by quarter: 24–20, 20–23, 19–19, 30–20
	Pts: Wright 25; Rebs: Wright 6 Asts: Lô 7 PIR: Wright 34	Boxscore	Pts: Oturu 22; Rebs: Bryant 7 Asts: Bryant, Micić 4 PIR: Oturu 25	Arena: Žalgirio Arena; Attendance: 14,708; Referees: Robert Lottermoser, Borys Ryzhyk, Uroš Obrknežević

13 February 2026	Monaco (French Federation of Basketball)	102–92	(Spanish Basketball Federation) Kosner Baskonia	Fontvieille
19:30	Scoring by quarter: 29–24, 17–26, 28–23, 28–19
	Pts: James 17; Rebs: Theis 6 Asts: James 8 PIR: Okobo 22	Boxscore	Pts: Forrest, Luwawu-Cabarrot 15; Rebs: Omoruyi 8 Asts: Forrest, Omoruyi 4 PIR: Forrest 22	Arena: Salle Gaston Médecin; Attendance: 4,572; Referees: Sreten Radović, Gytis Vilius, Sašo Petek

13 February 2026	Panathinaikos AKTOR (Hellenic Basketball Federation)	83–85	(Turkish Basketball Federation) Fenerbahçe Beko	Marousi
20:15	Scoring by quarter: 19–25, 23–16, 20–15, 21–29
	Pts: Hernangómez 18; Rebs: Hernangómez 12; Asts: Grant 5 PIR: Hernangómez 31	Boxscore	Pts: Biberović 26; Rebs: Melli 10; Asts: Baldwin 9 PIR: Biberović 28	Arena: Telekom Center Athens; Attendance: 19,000; Referees: Carlos Peruga, Milan Nedović, Marcin Kowalski

13 February 2026	EA7 Emporio Armani Milan (Italian Basketball Federation)	78–96	(United Arab Emirates Basketball Association) Dubai Basketball	Milan
20:30	Scoring by quarter: 20–18, 26–33, 13–22, 19–23
	Pts: Gudurić 19; Rebs: four players 4 Asts: Gudurić 5 PIR: Gudurić 23	Boxscore	Pts: Kabengele 22; Rebs: Kabengele 10; Asts: Bacon 5 PIR: Kabengele 32	Arena: Allianz Cloud Arena; Attendance: 5,362; Referees: Ilija Belošević, Jordi Aliaga, Kristaps Konstantinovs

13 February 2026	Partizan Mozzart Bet (Basketball Federation of Serbia)	73–77	(Spanish Basketball Federation) Real Madrid	Belgrade
20:30	Scoring by quarter: 19–20, 14–23, 28–19, 12–15
	Pts: Brown 14; Rebs: Bonga, Fernando 8 Asts: Calathes, Brown 4 PIR: Fernando 22	Boxscore	Pts: Lyles, Hezonja 14; Rebs: Tavares 7 Asts: Campazzo, Hezonja 4 PIR: Lyles 20	Arena: Belgrade Arena; Attendance: 18,254; Referees: Emin Moğulkoç, Rain Peerandi, Thomas Bissuel

=== Round 29 ===
25 February 2026	Fenerbahçe Beko (Turkish Basketball Federation)	81–78	(Basketball Federation of Serbia) Partizan Mozzart Bet	Istanbul
18:45	Scoring by quarter: 20–20, 15–19, 22–17, 24–22
	Pts: Horton-Tucker 29; Rebs: Colson 8 Asts: Baldwin, Horton-Tucker 3 PIR: Horton-Tucker 33	Boxscore	Pts: Fernando 18; Rebs: Fernando 9 Asts: Calathes 7 PIR: Jones 22	Arena: Ülker Sports and Event Hall; Attendance: 11,883; Referees: Emilio Pérez, Ioannis Foufis, Manuel Attard

25 February 2026	Žalgiris (Lithuanian Basketball Federation)	99–94(OT)	(Hellenic Basketball Federation) Olympiacos	Kaunas
19:00	Scoring by quarter: 18–18, 19–21, 14–21, 22–13, Overtime: 9–9, 17–12
	Pts: Williams-Goss, Francisco 23; Rebs: Wright 13; Asts: Francisco 7 PIR: Francisco 36	Boxscore	Pts: Fournier 32; Rebs: Fournier 9 Asts: Jones 6 PIR: Jones 29	Arena: Žalgirio Arena; Attendance: 14,880; Referees: Ilija Belošević, Marcin Kowalski, Alberto Baena

25 February 2026	Crvena zvezda Meridianbet (Basketball Federation of Serbia)	91–81	(Turkish Basketball Federation) Anadolu Efes	Belgrade
20:30	Scoring by quarter: 19–23, 25–14, 21–25, 26–19
	Pts: Butler 21; Rebs: Bolomboy, Kalinić 7 Asts: Miller-McIntyre 6 PIR: Butler 22	Boxscore	Pts: Dozier 21; Rebs: Osmani 7 Asts: Dozier 5 PIR: Dozier 22	Arena: Belgrade Arena; Attendance: 16,797; Referees: Carlos Cortés, Jordi Aliaga, Hugues Thépénier

25 February 2026	Virtus Bologna (Italian Basketball Federation)	85–80	(Spanish Basketball Federation) Barcelona	Bologna
20:30	Scoring by quarter: 20–28, 27–15, 21–14, 17–23
	Pts: Edwards 22; Rebs: Diarra 9 Asts: Vildoza 7 PIR: Smailagić 21	Boxscore	Pts: Punter 27; Rebs: Shengelia 7 Asts: Laprovíttola 12; PIR: Punter 26	Arena: Virtus Arena; Attendance: 8,670; Referees: Emin Moğulkoç, Joseph Bissang, Artūras Šukys

26 February 2026	Dubai Basketball (United Arab Emirates Basketball Association)	96–85	(French Federation of Basketball) LDLC ASVEL	Dubai
17:00	Scoring by quarter: 24–17, 23–19, 28–22, 21–27
	Pts: Bacon 18; Rebs: Petrušev 6 Asts: Wright 7 PIR: Wright 27	Boxscore	Pts: Watson 17; Rebs: Eboua 8 Asts: Watson, Angola 4 PIR: Watson 22	Arena: Coca-Cola Arena; Attendance: 4,651; Referees: Sreten Radović, Rain Peerandi, Luka Kardum

26 February 2026	Monaco (French Federation of Basketball)	86–91	(Israeli Basketball Association) Maccabi Rapyd Tel Aviv	Fontvieille
19:30	Scoring by quarter: 17–30, 23–19, 23–19, 23–23
	Pts: Blossomgame 25; Rebs: Theis, Blossomgame 7 Asts: James 6 PIR: Blossomgame 33	Boxscore	Pts: Walker 18; Rebs: Hoard 7 Asts: Blatt 6 PIR: Hoard 21	Arena: Salle Gaston Médecin; Attendance: 4,599; Referees: Miguel Ángel Pérez, Jakub Zamojski, Eduard Udyanskyy

26 February 2026	Hapoel IBI Tel Aviv (Israeli Basketball Association)	92–86	(Italian Basketball Federation) EA7 Emporio Armani Milan	Tel Aviv
20:05	Scoring by quarter: 29–19, 20–28, 24–17, 19–22
	Pts: Bryant 25; Rebs: Micić 9 Asts: Bryant 8 PIR: Bryant 34	Boxscore	Pts: LeDay 22; Rebs: three players 5 Asts: Ellis 10; PIR: Nebo 24	Arena: Menora Mivtachim Arena; Attendance: 6,250; Referees: Carlos Peruga, Milan Nedović, Maxime Boubert

26 February 2026	Kosner Baskonia (Spanish Basketball Federation)	79–108	(Spanish Basketball Federation) Valencia Basket	Vitoria-Gasteiz
20:30	Scoring by quarter: 16–35, 19–33, 23–25, 21–15
	Pts: Luwawu-Cabarrot 16; Rebs: Diakite 9 Asts: Forrest, Simmons 3 PIR: Luwawu-Cabarrot 15	Boxscore	Pts: Montero 20; Rebs: Montero 8 Asts: Montero 6 PIR: Montero 29	Arena: Buesa Arena; Attendance: 9,115; Referees: Borys Ryzhyk, Tomislav Hordov, Sérgio Silva

26 February 2026	Real Madrid (Spanish Basketball Federation)	93–70	(German Basketball Federation) Bayern Munich	Madrid
20:45	Scoring by quarter: 19–12, 34–21, 25–14, 15–23
	Pts: Hezonja 16; Rebs: Okeke 5 Asts: Campazzo 6 PIR: Hezonja 19	Boxscore	Pts: Jessup 17; Rebs: Gabriel 8 Asts: Dimitrijević 4 PIR: Jessup 18	Arena: Movistar Arena; Attendance: 9,728; Referees: Damir Javor, Gytis Vilius, Josip Radojković

26 February 2026	Panathinaikos AKTOR (Hellenic Basketball Federation)	99–104	(French Federation of Basketball) Paris Basketball	Marousi
20:45	Scoring by quarter: 29–29, 16–29, 25–22, 29–24
	Pts: Hayes-Davis 27; Rebs: Rogkavopoulos 8 Asts: Shorts 8 PIR: Hayes-Davis 30	Boxscore	Pts: Hifi 20; Rebs: Dokossi 7 Asts: Robinson 7 PIR: Hifi 21	Arena: Telekom Center Athens; Attendance: 18,813; Referees: Juan Carlos García, Milivoje Jovčić, Sergio Manuel

=== Round 30 ===
5 March 2026	Fenerbahçe Beko (Turkish Basketball Federation)	88–70	(French Federation of Basketball) Monaco	Istanbul
18:45	Scoring by quarter: 20–15, 24–21, 22–16, 22–18
	Pts: Horton-Tucker 28; Rebs: Birch 9 Asts: Baldwin 6 PIR: Horton-Tucker 25	Boxscore	Pts: James 14; Rebs: Diallo 8 Asts: James 8 PIR: James 23	Arena: Ülker Sports and Event Hall; Attendance: 11,578; Referees: Sreten Radović, Carlos Cortés, Saulius Račys

5 March 2026	Valencia Basket (Spanish Basketball Federation)	91–87	(Lithuanian Basketball Federation) Žalgiris	Valencia
20:30	Scoring by quarter: 25–13, 25–26, 21–25, 20–23
	Pts: Moore 16; Rebs: Key, Pradilla 6 Asts: four players 3 PIR: Moore, Reuvers 18	Boxscore	Pts: Wright 20; Rebs: Wright 9 Asts: Lô 7 PIR: Wright 27	Arena: Roig Arena; Attendance: 11,966; Referees: Damir Javor, Joseph Bissang, Piotr Pastusiak

5 March 2026	EA7 Emporio Armani Milan (Italian Basketball Federation)	87–84	(Spanish Basketball Federation) Barcelona	Milan
20:30	Scoring by quarter: 24–17, 22–17, 32–17, 9–33
	Pts: LeDay 16; Rebs: Nebo, LeDay 7 Asts: Bolmaro 6 PIR: Bolmaro, LeDay 22	Boxscore	Pts: Shengelia, Veselý 15; Rebs: Shengelia 7 Asts: Satoranský 5 PIR: Satoranský 22	Arena: Allianz Cloud Arena; Attendance: 5,362; Referees: Robert Lottermoser, Borys Ryzhyk, Marcin Kowalski

5 March 2026	Real Madrid (Spanish Basketball Federation)	92–84	(Italian Basketball Federation) Virtus Bologna	Madrid
20:45	Scoring by quarter: 22–23, 24–17, 18–21, 28–23
	Pts: Hezonja 19; Rebs: Okeke 7 Asts: Campazzo, Feliz 4 PIR: Hezonja, Tavares 22	Boxscore	Pts: Edwards 32; Rebs: Smailagić 11; Asts: Edwards, Vildoza 5 PIR: Edwards 27	Arena: Movistar Arena; Attendance: 8,368; Referees: Ilija Belošević, Milan Nedović, Steve Bittner

6 March 2026	Anadolu Efes (Turkish Basketball Federation)	88–91	(French Federation of Basketball) LDLC ASVEL	Istanbul
18:30	Scoring by quarter: 19–26, 28–23, 15–19, 26–23
	Pts: Hazer 20; Rebs: Jones 7 Asts: Dozier 5 PIR: Lee 29	Boxscore	Pts: Angola 26; Rebs: Massa 6 Asts: Heurtel 7 PIR: Angola 28	Arena: Basketball Development Center; Attendance: 4,338; Referees: Tomislav Hordov, Jakub Zamojski, Alberto Baena

6 March 2026	Crvena zvezda Meridianbet (Basketball Federation of Serbia)	80–85	(German Basketball Federation) Bayern Munich	Belgrade
20:00	Scoring by quarter: 17–23, 26–27, 27–22, 10–13
	Pts: Moneke 22; Rebs: Moneke 6 Asts: Miller-McIntyre 8 PIR: Moneke 28	Boxscore	Pts: Obst 16; Rebs: Mike 6 Asts: Dimitrijević, Hollatz 4 PIR: Lučić 13	Arena: Belgrade Arena; Attendance: 18,088; Referees: Carlos Peruga, Ioannis Foufis, Eduard Udyanskyy

6 March 2026	Olympiacos (Hellenic Basketball Federation)	86–80	(Hellenic Basketball Federation) Panathinaikos AKTOR	Piraeus
20:15	Scoring by quarter: 20–13, 20–16, 18–27, 28–24
	Pts: Dorsey 13; Rebs: Jones 6 Asts: Dorsey, McKissic 4 PIR: Milutinov 18	Boxscore	Pts: Nunn 20; Rebs: Hernangómez 7 Asts: Nunn 6 PIR: Hernangómez, Nunn 17	Arena: Peace and Friendship Stadium; Attendance: 12,750; Referees: Miguel Ángel Pérez, Emilio Pérez, Sašo Petek

6 March 2026	Kosner Baskonia (Spanish Basketball Federation)	81–97	(French Federation of Basketball) Paris Basketball	Vitoria-Gasteiz
20:30	Scoring by quarter: 20–24, 17–34, 23–26, 21–13
	Pts: Omoruyi 17; Rebs: Frisch 6 Asts: three players 3 PIR: Diakite, Frisch 15	Boxscore	Pts: Hifi 21; Rebs: Dokossi 11; Asts: Dokossi 6 PIR: Hifi 18	Arena: Buesa Arena; Attendance: 8,099; Referees: Saša Pukl, Gytis Vilius, Miloš Koljenšić

17 March 2026	Partizan Mozzart Bet (Basketball Federation of Serbia)	88–74	(United Arab Emirates Basketball Association) Dubai Basketball	Belgrade
20:00	Scoring by quarter: 18–26, 20–21, 25–10, 25–17
	Pts: Jones 23; Rebs: Fernando 8 Asts: Jones 5 PIR: Jones 31	Boxscore	Pts: Kabengele 14; Rebs: Petrušev 6 Asts: Wright 5 PIR: Kabengele 20	Arena: Belgrade Arena; Attendance: 10,109; Referees: Mehdi Difallah, Artūras Šukys, Maxime Boubert
Note: Originally scheduled for 5 March 2026, the game was postponed due to 2026 Iran war.

12 April 2026	Maccabi Rapyd Tel Aviv (Israeli Basketball Association)	88–99	(Israeli Basketball Association) Hapoel IBI Tel Aviv	Belgrade (Note: On March 4, 2026 the EuroLeague announced Maccabi Rapyd Tel Aviv would play their home matches in Serbia due to the inability to host matches in Israel as a result of the 2026 Iran war.)
21:15	Scoring by quarter: 14–26, 27–26, 25–21, 22–26
	Pts: Walker 17; Rebs: Brissett, Hoard 9 Asts: three players 4 PIR: Hoard 24	Boxscore	Pts: Bryant 19; Rebs: Jones 7 Asts: Jones 11; PIR: Jones 26	Arena: Aleksandar Nikolić Hall; Attendance: 565; Referees: Oļegs Latiševs, Milivoje Jovčić, Igor Dragojević
Note: Originally scheduled for 5 March 2026, the game was postponed due to 2026 Iran war.

=== Round 31 ===
11 March 2026	Virtus Bologna (Italian Basketball Federation)	82–88	(Basketball Federation of Serbia) Partizan Mozzart Bet	Bologna
20:45	Scoring by quarter: 25–29, 23–23, 15–13, 19–23
	Pts: Edwards 19; Rebs: Ferrari, Niang 7 Asts: Edwards, Morgan 3 PIR: Diouf 20	Boxscore	Pts: Jones 19; Rebs: Bonga 11; Asts: Bonga, Calathes 5 PIR: Bonga 34	Arena: Virtus Arena; Attendance: 6,468; Referees: Borys Ryzhyk, Gytis Vilius, Thomas Bissuel

12 March 2026	Monaco (French Federation of Basketball)	81–80	(Hellenic Basketball Federation) Olympiacos	Fontvieille
19:00	Scoring by quarter: 22–14, 21–23, 19–26, 19–17
	Pts: James 14; Rebs: Begarin 7 Asts: James, Strazel 5 PIR: James 22	Boxscore	Pts: Dorsey 19; Rebs: Milutinov 10; Asts: Ntilikina 4 PIR: Milutinov 30	Arena: Salle Gaston Médecin; Attendance: 4,545; Referees: Damir Javor, Luka Kardum, Sergio Manuel

12 March 2026	Dubai Basketball (United Arab Emirates Basketball Association)	100–94	(Spanish Basketball Federation) Kosner Baskonia	Sarajevo (Note: On March 4, 2026 the EuroLeague announced Dubai Basketball would play their home matches in Bosnia and Herzegovina due to the 2026 Iran war.)
20:00	Scoring by quarter: 29–21, 30–24, 24–22, 17–27
	Pts: Bacon 23; Rebs: Musa 7 Asts: Wright 4 PIR: Musa 23	Boxscore	Pts: Diakite 27; Rebs: Diakite 12; Asts: Howard, Simmons 5 PIR: Diakite 37	Arena: Juan Antonio Samaranch Olympic Hall; Attendance: 5,250; Referees: Robert Lottermoser, Milan Nedović, Joseph Bissang

12 March 2026	Bayern Munich (German Basketball Federation)	80–81	(Turkish Basketball Federation) Anadolu Efes	Munich
20:30	Scoring by quarter: 17–14, 22–12, 19–27, 22–28
	Pts: Rathan-Mayes 15; Rebs: three players 4 Asts: Hollatz 5 PIR: Obst, Rathan-Mayes 14	Boxscore	Pts: Loyd 20; Rebs: Osmani 6 Asts: Weiler-Babb 4 PIR: Loyd 24	Arena: SAP Garden; Attendance: 9,873; Referees: Emilio Pérez, Saulius Račys, Michele Rossi

12 March 2026	Real Madrid (Spanish Basketball Federation)	96–79	(Spanish Basketball Federation) Valencia Basket	Madrid
20:45	Scoring by quarter: 20–19, 31–24, 24–22, 21–14
	Pts: Hezonja 16; Rebs: Tavares 9 Asts: Campazzo 9 PIR: Hezonja 19	Boxscore	Pts: Montero 18; Rebs: Pradilla 10; Asts: Montero 5 PIR: Montero 27	Arena: Movistar Arena; Attendance: 10,837; Referees: Saša Pukl, Oļegs Latiševs, Marcin Kowalski

12 March 2026	Paris Basketball (French Federation of Basketball)	90–81	(French Federation of Basketball) LDLC ASVEL	Paris
21:00	Scoring by quarter: 17–23, 14–17, 29–13, 30–28
	Pts: Robinson 25; Rebs: Cavalière 7 Asts: Robinson 6 PIR: Robinson 32	Boxscore	Pts: Watson 14; Rebs: Eboua 6 Asts: Heurtel 9 PIR: Eboua 17	Arena: Adidas Arena; Attendance: 7,694; Referees: Ilija Belošević, Kristaps Konstantinovs, Josip Radojković

12 March 2026	Panathinaikos AKTOR (Hellenic Basketball Federation)	92–88	(Lithuanian Basketball Federation) Žalgiris	Marousi
21:00	Scoring by quarter: 24–27, 20–13, 21–19, 27–29
	Pts: Osman 24; Rebs: Hernangómez 9 Asts: Grant 5 PIR: Osman 36	Boxscore	Pts: Francisco 23; Rebs: Birutis, Lô 5 Asts: Francisco, Williams-Goss 4 PIR: Francisco 28	Arena: Telekom Center Athens; Attendance: 18,913; Referees: Carlos Peruga, Rain Peerandi, Manuel Attard

13 March 2026	Crvena zvezda Meridianbet (Basketball Federation of Serbia)	79–73	(Turkish Basketball Federation) Fenerbahçe Beko	Belgrade
20:00	Scoring by quarter: 17–20, 16–22, 28–14, 18–17
	Pts: Moneke 21; Rebs: Miller-McIntyre 8 Asts: Miller-McIntyre 12; PIR: Miller-McIntyre 21	Boxscore	Pts: Baldwin 16; Rebs: Birch 10; Asts: Horton-Tucker 5 PIR: Colson 20	Arena: Belgrade Arena; Attendance: 20,377; Referees: Juan Carlos García, Mehdi Difallah, Sérgio Silva

13 March 2026	Barcelona (Spanish Basketball Federation)	75–80	(Israeli Basketball Association) Hapoel IBI Tel Aviv	Barcelona
20:30	Scoring by quarter: 26–19, 14–27, 21–20, 14–14
	Pts: Punter 17; Rebs: Norris 7 Asts: Satoranský 4 PIR: Punter 17	Boxscore	Pts: Oturu 22; Rebs: Edwards 8 Asts: Micić 7 PIR: Bryant 32	Arena: Palau Blaugrana; Attendance: 0 (Note: Barcelona played their regular season home game against Hapoel IBI Tel Aviv behind closed doors for safety reasons.); Referees: Emin Moğulkoç, Artūras Šukys, Robert Vyklický

13 March 2026	EA7 Emporio Armani Milan (Italian Basketball Federation)	96–87	(Israeli Basketball Association) Maccabi Rapyd Tel Aviv	Milan
20:30	Scoring by quarter: 25–26, 28–16, 21–25, 22–20
	Pts: Nebo 19; Rebs: Nebo 10; Asts: Gudurić 8 PIR: Nebo 26	Boxscore	Pts: Walker IV 16; Rebs: Brissett 12; Asts: Blatt 5 PIR: Sorkin 16	Arena: Allianz Cloud Arena; Attendance: 4,230; Referees: Tomislav Hordov, Jordi Aliaga, Hugues Thepenier

=== Round 32 ===
19 March 2026	Valencia Basket (Spanish Basketball Federation)	62–66	(Spanish Basketball Federation) Barcelona	Valencia
18:00	Scoring by quarter: 15–18, 18–17, 19–18, 10–13
	Pts: Sako 12; Rebs: Puerto, Sako 5 Asts: Thompson 4 PIR: Sako 14	Boxscore	Pts: Parra 14; Rebs: Parra 9 Asts: Brizuela, Satoranský 4 PIR: Parra 19	Arena: Roig Arena; Attendance: 13,558; Referees: Ilija Belošević, Mehdi Difallah, Sašo Petek

19 March 2026	Anadolu Efes (Turkish Basketball Federation)	93–98	(French Federation of Basketball) Monaco	Istanbul
18:30	Scoring by quarter: 21–23, 32–22, 20–21, 20–32
	Pts: Hazer 26; Rebs: Dozier, Šmits 4 Asts: Weiler-Babb 4 PIR: Hazer 26	Boxscore	Pts: three players 17; Rebs: Theis 5 Asts: Okobo 7 PIR: Blossomgame 22	Arena: Turkcell Basketball Development Center; Attendance: 3,333; Referees: Milivoje Jovčić, Milan Nedović, Eduard Udyanskyy

19 March 2026	Hapoel IBI Tel Aviv (Israeli Basketball Association)	109–91	(Italian Basketball Federation) Virtus Bologna	Sofia
20:05	Scoring by quarter: 34–19, 31–21, 21–22, 23–29
	Pts: Motley 22; Rebs: Edwards 7 Asts: Jones 10; PIR: Motley 25	Boxscore	Pts: Alston, Morgan 24; Rebs: Diarra 8 Asts: Diarra, Edwards 5 PIR: Diarra 26	Arena: Arena 8888 Sofia; Attendance: 2,201; Referees: Carlos Peruga, Jakub Zamojski, Luka Kardum

19 March 2026	Olympiacos (Hellenic Basketball Federation)	90–80	(Spanish Basketball Federation) Kosner Baskonia	Piraeus
20:15	Scoring by quarter: 19–24, 22–16, 28–22, 21–18
	Pts: Vezenkov 20; Rebs: Milutinov, Vezenkov 6 Asts: Walkup 7 PIR: Milutinov, Vezenkov 24	Boxscore	Pts: Omoruyi 18; Rebs: three players 5 Asts: three players 5 PIR: Forrest, Omoruyi 20	Arena: Peace and Friendship Stadium; Attendance: 11,397; Referees: Emin Moğulkoç, Tomislav Hordov, Sérgio Silva

19 March 2026	Bayern Munich (German Basketball Federation)	74–87	(United Arab Emirates Basketball Association) Dubai Basketball	Munich
20:30	Scoring by quarter: 21–18, 16–24, 14–23, 23–22
	Pts: da Silva 12; Rebs: Hollatz 6 Asts: Hollatz 6 PIR: da Silva 21	Boxscore	Pts: Bacon 21; Rebs: Musa 6 Asts: Wright 9 PIR: Bacon 27	Arena: SAP Garden; Attendance: 8,726; Referees: Saša Pukl, Gytis Vilius, Amit Balak

19 March 2026	Paris Basketball (French Federation of Basketball)	81–90	(Basketball Federation of Serbia) Partizan Mozzart Bet	Paris
20:45	Scoring by quarter: 20–17, 23–29, 14–20, 24–24
	Pts: Hifi 23; Rebs: Dokossi 9 Asts: Robinson 5 PIR: Hifi 19	Boxscore	Pts: Brown 17; Rebs: Brown 8 Asts: Calathes 10; PIR: Jekiri 22	Arena: Adidas Arena; Attendance: 7,052; Referees: Juan Carlos García, Saulius Račys, Piotr Pastusiak

20 March 2026	Fenerbahçe Beko (Turkish Basketball Federation)	79–75	(Italian Basketball Federation) EA7 Emporio Armani Milan	Istanbul
18:45	Scoring by quarter: 17–23, 12–14, 28–15, 22–23
	Pts: Horton-Tucker 23; Rebs: Birsen 8 Asts: Baldwin 4 PIR: de Colo, Horton-Tucker 19	Boxscore	Pts: Brooks 22; Rebs: Leday, Nebo 6 Asts: Ellis 5 PIR: Brooks 19	Arena: Ülker Sports and Event Hall; Attendance: 11,314; Referees: Emilio Pérez, Damir Javor, Carlos Cortés

20 March 2026	Žalgiris (Lithuanian Basketball Federation)	87–85	(Spanish Basketball Federation) Real Madrid	Kaunas
19:00	Scoring by quarter: 25–29, 28–26, 15–17, 19–13
	Pts: Francisco 20; Rebs: Tubelis 9 Asts: Williams-Goss 10; PIR: Francisco 22	Boxscore	Pts: Hezonja 18; Rebs: Tavares 10; Asts: Abalde, Llull 4 PIR: Tavares 25	Arena: Žalgirio Arena; Attendance: 15,316; Referees: Sreten Radović, Borys Ryzhyk, Miloš Koljenšić

20 March 2026	Panathinaikos AKTOR (Hellenic Basketball Federation)	82–74	(Basketball Federation of Serbia) Crvena zvezda Meridianbet	Marousi
20:15	Scoring by quarter: 20–27, 21–21, 14–14, 27–12
	Pts: Hayes-Davis, Nunn 20; Rebs: Hernangómez 9 Asts: Sloukas 8 PIR: Hayes-Davis 21	Boxscore	Pts: Butler 15; Rebs: Moneke 7 Asts: Miller-McIntyre 10; PIR: Miller-McIntyre 18	Arena: Telekom Center Athens; Attendance: 18,302; Referees: Robert Lottermoser, Oļegs Latiševs, Alberto Baena

20 March 2026	LDLC ASVEL (French Federation of Basketball)	85–89	(Israeli Basketball Association) Maccabi Rapyd Tel Aviv	Villeurbanne
20:45	Scoring by quarter: 22–23, 30–15, 10–23, 23–28
	Pts: Eboua 19; Rebs: Massa 8 Asts: Heurtel 7 PIR: Watson 23	Boxscore	Pts: Sorkin 23; Rebs: Hoard 11; Asts: Blatt 13; PIR: Blatt 27	Arena: Astroballe; Attendance: 4,763; Referees: Miguel Ángel Pérez, Artūras Šukys, Uroš Obrknežević

=== Round 33 ===
24 March 2026	Maccabi Rapyd Tel Aviv (Israeli Basketball Association)	94–89	(Turkish Basketball Federation) Fenerbahçe Beko	Belgrade
18:30	Scoring by quarter: 25–20, 32–23, 15–23, 22–23
	Pts: Sorkin 19; Rebs: Hoard 9 Asts: Blatt, Clark 8 PIR: Sorkin 19	Boxscore	Pts: de Colo 26; Rebs: Birch, Birsen 5 Asts: Baldwin 7 PIR: de Colo 26	Arena: Aleksandar Nikolić Hall; Attendance: 162; Referees: Ilija Belošević, Luka Kardum, Alberto Baena

24 March 2026	Žalgiris (Lithuanian Basketball Federation)	78–71	(German Basketball Federation) Bayern Munich	Kaunas
19:00	Scoring by quarter: 18–18, 16–20, 29–19, 15–14
	Pts: Tubelis 21; Rebs: Wright 7 Asts: Francisco 7 PIR: Wright 23	Boxscore	Pts: da Silva 12; Rebs: da Silva 10; Asts: Rathan-Mayes 3 PIR: da Silva 14	Arena: Žalgirio Arena; Attendance: 14,777; Referees: Juan Carlos García, Sašo Petek, Tomasz Trawicki

24 March 2026	Monaco (French Federation of Basketball)	90–85	(Italian Basketball Federation) EA7 Emporio Armani Milan	Fontvieille
19:00	Scoring by quarter: 13–25, 32–23, 18–25, 27–12
	Pts: Diallo 17; Rebs: Hayes 7 Asts: Okobo 13; PIR: Okobo 28	Boxscore	Pts: Shields 18; Rebs: Nebo 8 Asts: Ellis 5 PIR: Shields 20	Arena: Salle Gaston Médecin; Attendance: 4,505; Referees: Carlos Peruga, Oļegs Latiševs, Steve Bittner

24 March 2026	Dubai Basketball (United Arab Emirates Basketball Association)	104–107	(Hellenic Basketball Federation) Panathinaikos AKTOR	Sarajevo
19:30	Scoring by quarter: 26–25, 24–22, 25–34, 29–26
	Pts: Musa 31; Rebs: Kabengele, Wright 4 Asts: Wright 8 PIR: Musa 32	Boxscore	Pts: Osman 23; Rebs: Lessort 7 Asts: Grant 6 PIR: Nunn, Osman 24	Arena: Juan Antonio Samaranch Olympic Hall; Attendance: 6,103; Referees: Mehdi Difallah, Artūras Šukys, Robert Vyklický

24 March 2026	Valencia Basket (Spanish Basketball Federation)	85–84	(Hellenic Basketball Federation) Olympiacos	Valencia
20:30	Scoring by quarter: 25–23, 17–27, 25–19, 18–15
	Pts: Badio 15; Rebs: four players 5 Asts: Montero 6 PIR: Montero 21	Boxscore	Pts: Vezenkov 17; Rebs: Jones 8 Asts: Walkup 6 PIR: Vezenkov 19	Arena: Roig Arena; Attendance: 13,108; Referees: Milan Nedović, Miloš Koljenšić, Kristaps Konstantinovs

24 March 2026	Barcelona (Spanish Basketball Federation)	78–71	(Turkish Basketball Federation) Anadolu Efes	Barcelona
20:30	Scoring by quarter: 19–15, 23–15, 15–24, 21–17
	Pts: Clyburn 21; Rebs: Shengelia 8 Asts: Brizuela, Shengelia 3 PIR: Shengelia 25	Boxscore	Pts: Osmani 18; Rebs: Osmani 8 Asts: Dozier, Jones 3 PIR: Osmani 23	Arena: Palau Blaugrana; Attendance: 4,861; Referees: Saša Pukl, Tomislav Hordov, Sérgio Silva

24 March 2026	Partizan Mozzart Bet (Basketball Federation of Serbia)	79–78	(French Federation of Basketball) LDLC ASVEL	Belgrade
20:45	Scoring by quarter: 14–24, 22–8, 23–25, 20–21
	Pts: Osetkowski 16; Rebs: Jones, Osetkowski 5 Asts: four players 4 PIR: Osetkowski 22	Boxscore	Pts: Heurtel 19; Rebs: Vautier 6 Asts: Heurtel 9 PIR: Heurtel 18	Arena: Belgrade Arena; Attendance: 10,124; Referees: Robert Lottermoser, Carlos Cortés, Eduard Udyanskyy

24 March 2026	Real Madrid (Spanish Basketball Federation)	92–83	(Israeli Basketball Association) Hapoel IBI Tel Aviv	Madrid
21:00	Scoring by quarter: 24–19, 21–16, 26–25, 21–23
	Pts: Hezonja 15; Rebs: Hezonja 10; Asts: Campazzo 5 PIR: Hezonja 23	Boxscore	Pts: Jones 15; Rebs: Edwards, Micić 5 Asts: Micić 4 PIR: Edwards 19	Arena: Movistar Arena; Attendance: 0 (Note: Real Madrid played their regular season home game against Hapoel IBI Tel Aviv behind closed doors for safety reasons.); Referees: Damir Javor, Gytis Vilius, Saulius Račys

25 March 2026	Kosner Baskonia (Spanish Basketball Federation)	100–108(OT)	(Basketball Federation of Serbia) Crvena zvezda Meridianbet	Vitoria-Gasteiz
20:30	Scoring by quarter: 27–28, 25–14, 15–24, 24–25, Overtime: 9–17
	Pts: Forrest 31; Rebs: Luwawu-Cabarrot 7 Asts: Simmons 5 PIR: Forrest 36	Boxscore	Pts: Moneke 22; Rebs: Bolomboy, Moneke 8 Asts: Miller-McIntyre 13; PIR: Moneke 32	Arena: Buesa Arena; Attendance: 7,375; Referees: Borys Ryzhyk, Jakub Zamojski, Rain Peerandi

31 March 2026	Virtus Bologna (Italian Basketball Federation)	82–103	(French Federation of Basketball) Paris Basketball	Bologna
20:45	Scoring by quarter: 20–19, 27–34, 16–23, 19–27
	Pts: Diouf, Morgan 16; Rebs: Niang 8 Asts: Vildoza 6 PIR: Niang 20	Boxscore	Pts: Hifi 20; Rebs: three players 5 Asts: Robinson 6 PIR: Hifi 28	Arena: PalaDozza; Attendance: 5,133; Referees: Emilio Pérez, Jordi Aliaga, Vasiliki Tsaroucha

=== Round 34 ===
10 March 2026	Paris Basketball (French Federation of Basketball)	87–104	(Hellenic Basketball Federation) Olympiacos	Paris
20:45	Scoring by quarter: 22–33, 33–30, 16–24, 16–17
	Pts: Robinson 18; Rebs: Dokossi 7 Asts: Robinson 9 PIR: Robinson 27	Boxscore	Pts: Dorsey 24; Rebs: Jones, Milutinov 5 Asts: Dorsey 5 PIR: Dorsey 27	Arena: Adidas Arena; Attendance: 7,595; Referees: Sreten Radović, Jakub Zamojski, Uroš Obrknežević

26 March 2026	Bayern Munich (German Basketball Federation)	93–83	(French Federation of Basketball) LDLC ASVEL	Munich
20:30	Scoring by quarter: 19–18, 20–24, 25–21, 29–20
	Pts: Jessup 19; Rebs: McCormack 8 Asts: Hollatz 7 PIR: McCormack 25	Boxscore	Pts: Traoré 16; Rebs: Seljaas 6 Asts: Heurtel 10; PIR: Heurtel 18	Arena: SAP Garden; Attendance: 8,896; Referees: Emin Moğulkoç, Jordi Aliaga, Guido Giovannetti

26 March 2026	EA7 Emporio Armani Milan (Italian Basketball Federation)	103–87	(Italian Basketball Federation) Virtus Bologna	Assago
20:30	Scoring by quarter: 32–19, 25–30, 22–17, 24–21
	Pts: Leday 19; Rebs: Leday 8 Asts: Ellis, Mannion 6 PIR: Leday 31	Boxscore	Pts: Niang 15; Rebs: Morgan 5 Asts: Niang, Vildoza 4 PIR: Niang 19	Arena: Unipol Forum; Attendance: 8,564; Referees: Miguel Ángel Pérez, Milan Nedović, Amit Balak

26 March 2026	Maccabi Rapyd Tel Aviv (Israeli Basketball Association)	104–100(OT)	(United Arab Emirates Basketball Association) Dubai Basketball	Belgrade
20:30	Scoring by quarter: 18–17, 23–28, 22–25, 25–18, Overtime: 16–12
	Pts: Clark 23; Rebs: Brissett 9 Asts: Clark 10; PIR: Clark 27	Boxscore	Pts: Wright 26; Rebs: Kabengele 12; Asts: Wright 6 PIR: Wright 30	Arena: Aleksandar Nikolić Hall; Attendance: 129; Referees: Sreten Radović, Miloš Koljenšić, Anne Panther

26 March 2026	Real Madrid (Spanish Basketball Federation)	82–71	(Turkish Basketball Federation) Anadolu Efes	Madrid
20:45	Scoring by quarter: 11–21, 31–12, 18–20, 22–18
	Pts: Lyles 14; Rebs: Tavares 9 Asts: Campazzo 7 PIR: Deck 21	Boxscore	Pts: Loyd 21; Rebs: Osmani 7 Asts: Loyd 6 PIR: Loyd 35	Arena: Movistar Arena; Attendance: 9,805; Referees: Mehdi Difallah, Seffi Shemmesh, Josip Radojković

27 March 2026	Fenerbahçe Beko (Turkish Basketball Federation)	82–92	(Lithuanian Basketball Federation) Žalgiris	Istanbul
18:45	Scoring by quarter: 25–22, 19–27, 18–17, 20–26
	Pts: Baldwin 19; Rebs: Jantunen 7 Asts: Baldwin, Hall 4 PIR: Baldwin 19	Boxscore	Pts: Sleva 18; Rebs: Butkevičius 8 Asts: Francisco 8 PIR: Butkevičius 23	Arena: Ülker Sports and Event Hall; Attendance: 11,913; Referees: Tomislav Hordov, Joseph Bissang, Igor Dragojević

27 March 2026	Panathinaikos AKTOR (Hellenic Basketball Federation)	107–97	(French Federation of Basketball) Monaco	Marousi
20:15	Scoring by quarter: 15–16, 37–19, 26–27, 29–35
	Pts: Nunn 25; Rebs: Lessort 8 Asts: Sloukas 7 PIR: Nunn 19	Boxscore	Pts: Okobo 24; Rebs: Blossomgame 9 Asts: Okobo 13; PIR: Okobo 34	Arena: Telekom Center Athens; Attendance: 18,913; Referees: Ilija Belošević, Emilio Pérez, Kristaps Konstantinovs

27 March 2026	Partizan Mozzart Bet (Basketball Federation of Serbia)	110–104(OT)	(Spanish Basketball Federation) Valencia Basket	Belgrade
20:30	Scoring by quarter: 17–27, 24–14, 18–25, 25–18, Overtime: 13–13, 13–7
	Pts: Brown 31; Rebs: Brown 7 Asts: Calathes, Jones 6 PIR: Brown 32	Boxscore	Pts: Taylor 18; Rebs: Key 8 Asts: Thompson 8 PIR: Taylor 25	Arena: Belgrade Arena; Attendance: 13,125; Referees: Borys Ryzhyk, Artūras Šukys, Thomas Bissuel

27 March 2026	Kosner Baskonia (Spanish Basketball Federation)	118–109	(Israeli Basketball Association) Hapoel IBI Tel Aviv	Vitoria-Gasteiz
20:30	Scoring by quarter: 28–31, 39–33, 25–17, 26–28
	Pts: Forrest 22; Rebs: Omoruyi 4 Asts: Nowell 5 PIR: Forrest 29	Boxscore	Pts: Bryant 26; Rebs: Bryant 5 Asts: Jones 7 PIR: Bryant 31	Arena: Buesa Arena; Attendance: 0 (Note: Baskonia played their regular season home game against Hapoel IBI Tel Aviv behind closed doors for safety reasons.); Referees: Robert Lottermoser, Milivoje Jovčić, Maxime Boubert

27 March 2026	Barcelona (Spanish Basketball Federation)	92–88(OT)	(Basketball Federation of Serbia) Crvena zvezda Meridianbet	Barcelona
21:00	Scoring by quarter: 18–20, 24–20, 22–18, 11–17, Overtime: 17–13
	Pts: Clyburn 18; Rebs: Satoranský 8 Asts: Satoranský 6 PIR: Satoranský 24	Boxscore	Pts: Nwora 26; Rebs: Nwora 9 Asts: Miller-McIntyre 7 PIR: Nwora 24	Arena: Palau Blaugrana; Attendance: 4,889; Referees: Ioannis Foufis, Piotr Pastusiak, Saulius Račys

=== Round 35 ===
1 April 2026	Bayern Munich (German Basketball Federation)	85–76	(Turkish Basketball Federation) Fenerbahçe Beko	Munich
19:00	Scoring by quarter: 25–12, 18–18, 24–30, 18–16
	Pts: Dimitrijević 22; Rebs: Gabriel 10; Asts: Obst 4 PIR: Dimitrijević 25	Boxscore	Pts: Biberović 21; Rebs: Colson 6 Asts: Baldwin 5 PIR: Biberović 24	Arena: SAP Garden; Attendance: 11,500; Referees: Miguel Ángel Pérez, Artūras Šukys, Miloš Koljenšić

2 April 2026	Žalgiris (Lithuanian Basketball Federation)	83–71	(Spanish Basketball Federation) Barcelona	Kaunas
19:00	Scoring by quarter: 22–21, 17–19, 20–16, 24–15
	Pts: Wright 18; Rebs: Wright 11; Asts: Francisco 8 PIR: Wright 28	Boxscore	Pts: Punter 16; Rebs: Shengelia, Parra 4 Asts: Satoranský 4 PIR: Punter 13	Arena: Žalgirio Arena; Attendance: 15,278; Referees: Damir Javor, Luka Kardum, Eduard Udyanskyy

2 April 2026	Hapoel IBI Tel Aviv (Israeli Basketball Association)	92–88	(Hellenic Basketball Federation) Panathinaikos AKTOR	Sofia
19:00	Scoring by quarter: 20–21, 24–27, 22–27, 26–13
	Pts: Blakeney 19; Rebs: Malcolm 6 Asts: Jones 8 PIR: Blakeney 19	Boxscore	Pts: Hernangómez 17; Rebs: Hayes-Davis 9 Asts: Sloukas 8 PIR: Hernangómez 25	Arena: Arena Sofia; Attendance: 6,423; Referees: Emin Moğulkoç, Carlos Cortés, Piotr Pastusiak

2 April 2026	Dubai Basketball (United Arab Emirates Basketball Association)	101–91	(French Federation of Basketball) Monaco	Sarajevo
20:00	Scoring by quarter: 24–18, 23–29, 26–24, 28–20
	Pts: Musa 25; Rebs: Kabengele 9 Asts: Musa 10; PIR: Musa 38	Boxscore	Pts: Diallo, Hayes 17; Rebs: Hayes 6 Asts: Strazel 13; PIR: Hayes 21	Arena: Juan Antonio Samaranch Olympic Hall; Attendance: 5,916; Referees: Robert Lottermoser, Tomislav Hordov, Josip Radojković

2 April 2026	Crvena zvezda Meridianbet (Basketball Federation of Serbia)	82–89	(Basketball Federation of Serbia) Partizan Mozzart Bet	Belgrade
20:00	Scoring by quarter: 20–21, 18–17, 17–20, 27–31
	Pts: Miller-McIntyre 24; Rebs: Bolomboy 5 Asts: Miller-McIntyre 9 PIR: Miller-McIntyre 30	Boxscore	Pts: Jones 26; Rebs: Brown 7 Asts: Calathes 8 PIR: Jones 27	Arena: Belgrade Arena; Attendance: 20,120; Referees: Carlos Peruga, Mehdi Difallah, Gytis Vilius

2 April 2026	Paris Basketball (French Federation of Basketball)	103–93	(Italian Basketball Federation) EA7 Emporio Armani Milan	Paris
20:45	Scoring by quarter: 30–19, 34–22, 23–35, 16–17
	Pts: Hifi 25; Rebs: Stevens 6 Asts: four players 3 PIR: Hifi 34	Boxscore	Pts: Brooks 20; Rebs: Nebo 7 Asts: Gudurić 5 PIR: Brooks 19	Arena: Adidas Arena; Attendance: 7,855; Referees: Milivoje Jovčić, Marcin Kowalski, Sergio Manuel

2 April 2026	Maccabi Rapyd Tel Aviv (Israeli Basketball Association)	103–89	(Turkish Basketball Federation) Anadolu Efes	Belgrade
21:00	Scoring by quarter: 24–25, 25–19, 29–20, 25–25
	Pts: Walker 25; Rebs: Hoard 8 Asts: Clark 8 PIR: Hoard 24	Boxscore	Pts: Loyd 17; Rebs: Jones 6 Asts: Hazer, Weiler-Babb 5 PIR: Loyd 19	Arena: Aleksandar Nikolić Hall; Attendance: 80; Referees: Juan Carlos García, Ioannis Foufis, Sašo Petek

3 April 2026	LDLC ASVEL (French Federation of Basketball)	74–82	(Hellenic Basketball Federation) Olympiacos	Décines-Charpieu
20:00	Scoring by quarter: 24–25, 15–22, 19–14, 16–21
	Pts: Ajinça 17; Rebs: Traoré 6 Asts: Heurtel 9 PIR: Angola 16	Boxscore	Pts: Vezenkov 23; Rebs: Milutinov 9 Asts: Walkup 7 PIR: Vezenkov 26	Arena: LDLC Arena; Attendance: 8,783; Referees: Sreten Radović, Igor Dragojević, Manuel Attard

3 April 2026	Virtus Bologna (Italian Basketball Federation)	81–94	(Spanish Basketball Federation) Valencia Basket	Bologna
20:30	Scoring by quarter: 20–22, 23–22, 20–27, 18–23
	Pts: Edwards 26; Rebs: Diouf 8 Asts: Vildoza, Morgan 6 PIR: Edwards 23	Boxscore	Pts: Reuvers 33; Rebs: Reuvers 10; Asts: Montero 8 PIR: Reuvers 44	Arena: Virtus Arena; Attendance: 6,748; Referees: Ilija Belošević, Oļegs Latiševs, Sérgio Silva

3 April 2026	Kosner Baskonia (Spanish Basketball Federation)	98–96	(Spanish Basketball Federation) Real Madrid	Vitoria-Gasteiz
20:30	Scoring by quarter: 29–27, 19–26, 25–23, 25–20
	Pts: Luwawu-Cabarrot 26; Rebs: Luwawu-Cabarrot 6 Asts: Villar, Luwawu-Cabarrot 3 PIR: Luwawu-Cabarrot 26	Boxscore	Pts: Campazzo 21; Rebs: Tavares 11; Asts: Campazzo 9 PIR: Campazzo 30	Arena: Buesa Arena; Attendance: 11,239; Referees: Saša Pukl, Milan Nedović, Joseph Bissang

=== Round 36 ===
7 April 2026	Hapoel IBI Tel Aviv (Israeli Basketball Association)	95–80	(Turkish Basketball Federation) Fenerbahçe Beko	Sofia
18:00	Scoring by quarter: 25–17, 26–21, 24–18, 20–24
	Pts: Oturu 23; Rebs: Bryant 9 Asts: Jones 7 PIR: Bryant 32	Boxscore	Pts: Baldwin 22; Rebs: Colson 7 Asts: Baldwin 6 PIR: Baldwin 26	Arena: Arena Sofia; Attendance: 2,312; Referees: Emilio Pérez, Milan Nedović, Sašo Petek

7 April 2026	Žalgiris (Lithuanian Basketball Federation)	65–77	(United Arab Emirates Basketball Association) Dubai Basketball	Kaunas
19:00	Scoring by quarter: 19–14, 15–10, 19–15, 12–38
	Pts: Wright 15; Rebs: Butkevičius 9 Asts: Francisco 6 PIR: Butkevičius 22	Boxscore	Pts: Avramović 15; Rebs: three player 6 Asts: Wright IV 6 PIR: Caboclo 21	Arena: Žalgirio Arena; Attendance: 15,080; Referees: Carlos Peruga, Milivoje Jovčić, Hüseyin Çelik

7 April 2026	Crvena zvezda Meridianbet (Basketball Federation of Serbia)	94–81	(French Federation of Basketball) Paris Basketball	Belgrade
20:00	Scoring by quarter: 34–28, 23–26, 23–15, 14–12
	Pts: Moneke 21; Rebs: Moneke 9 Asts: Miller-McIntyre 14; PIR: Moneke 32	Boxscore	Pts: Hifi 20; Rebs: Dokossi 6 Asts: Hifi, Robinson 3 PIR: Hifi 23	Arena: Belgrade Arena; Attendance: 16,246; Referees: Juan Carlos García, Michele Rossi, Amit Balak

7 April 2026	Olympiacos (Hellenic Basketball Federation)	102–88	(Spanish Basketball Federation) Real Madrid	Piraeus
20:15	Scoring by quarter: 31–19, 18–23, 23–15, 30–31
	Pts: Dorsey 37; Rebs: Vezenkov 9 Asts: Joseph 6 PIR: Dorsey 43	Boxscore	Pts: Lyles 22; Rebs: Tavares 9 Asts: three players 4 PIR: Lyles 24	Arena: Peace and Friendship Stadium; Attendance: 12,750; Referees: Tomislav Hordov, Luka Kardum, Thomas Bissuel

7 April 2026	Virtus Bologna (Italian Basketball Federation)	80–85	(German Basketball Federation) Bayern Munich	Bologna
20:30	Scoring by quarter: 16–23, 27–20, 15–23, 22–19
	Pts: Morgan 28; Rebs: Diarra 7 Asts: Diouf 5 PIR: Morgan 28	Boxscore	Pts: McCormack 24; Rebs: McCormack 8 Asts: Dimitrijević 10; PIR: McCormack 30	Arena: Virtus Arena; Attendance: 5,637; Referees: Damir Javor, Borys Ryzhyk, Eduard Udyanskyy

7 April 2026	Valencia Basket (Spanish Basketball Federation)	102–96	(Italian Basketball Federation) EA7 Emporio Armani Milan	Valencia
20:30	Scoring by quarter: 27–24, 24–30, 27–29, 24–13
	Pts: Montero 25; Rebs: five players 5 Asts: Thompson 6 PIR: Montero 31	Boxscore	Pts: Brooks 20; Rebs: three players 4 Asts: Ellis 8 PIR: LeDay 18	Arena: Roig Arena; Attendance: 12,297; Referees: Sreten Radović, Saulius Račys, Franko Gracin

7 April 2026	Barcelona (Spanish Basketball Federation)	79–93	(Hellenic Basketball Federation) Panathinaikos AKTOR	Barcelona
20:30	Scoring by quarter: 23–27, 15–28, 11–25, 30–13
	Pts: Parra 18; Rebs: Norris 6 Asts: Marcos 7 PIR: Norris 22	Boxscore	Pts: Osman 21; Rebs: Lessort 7 Asts: Sloukas 5 PIR: Osman 27	Arena: Palau Blaugrana; Attendance: 5,461; Referees: Robert Lottermoser, Oļegs Latiševs, Manuel Attard

7 April 2026	Kosner Baskonia (Spanish Basketball Federation)	101–98	(Israeli Basketball Association) Maccabi Rapyd Tel Aviv	Vitoria-Gasteiz
21:00	Scoring by quarter: 28–36, 16–17, 40–19, 17–26
	Pts: Luwawu-Cabarrot 21; Rebs: Diakite, Radzevičius 6 Asts: Nowell 5 PIR: Luwawu-Cabarrot 26	Boxscore	Pts: Clark 26; Rebs: Sorkin 6 Asts: Clark 9 PIR: Sorkin 30	Arena: Buesa Arena; Attendance: 0 (Note: Baskonia played their regular season home game against Maccabi Rapyd Tel Aviv behind closed doors for safety reasons.); Referees: Mehdi Difallah, Gytis Vilius, Tomasz Trawicki

8 April 2026	Monaco (French Federation of Basketball)	81–76	(French Federation of Basketball) LDLC ASVEL	Fontvieille
19:30	Scoring by quarter: 22–21, 24–15, 18–18, 17–22
	Pts: Strazel 22; Rebs: Okobo 10; Asts: Okobo 8 PIR: Strazel 31	Boxscore	Pts: Angola 26; Rebs: Eboua 7 Asts: Angola 5 PIR: Angola 29	Arena: Salle Gaston Médecin; Attendance: 4,548; Referees: Saša Pukl, Miloš Koljenšić, Alberto Baena

8 April 2026	Anadolu Efes (Turkish Basketball Federation)	79–72(OT)	(Basketball Federation of Serbia) Partizan Mozzart Bet	Istanbul
19:30	Scoring by quarter: 15–13, 9–23, 19–14, 22–15, Overtime: 14–7
	Pts: Loyd 24; Rebs: Poirier, Osmani 8 Asts: Weiler-Babb 12; PIR: Poirier 26	Boxscore	Pts: Milton 12; Rebs: Bonga 7 Asts: Calathes 5 PIR: Bonga 15	Arena: Basketball Development Center; Attendance: 4,406; Referees: Miguel Ángel Pérez, Jordi Aliaga, Christian Theis

=== Round 37 ===
9 April 2026	Hapoel IBI Tel Aviv (Israeli Basketball Association)	85–89	(Hellenic Basketball Federation) Olympiacos	Sofia
18:30	Scoring by quarter: 18–22, 30–29, 19–22, 18–16
	Pts: Blakeney 16; Rebs: Malcolm 6 Asts: Jones, Micić 8 PIR: Micić 21	Boxscore	Pts: Dorsey 23; Rebs: Peters 8 Asts: Walkup, Dorsey 5 PIR: Dorsey 26	Arena: Arena 8888 Sofia; Attendance: 10,920; Referees: Ilija Belošević, Joseph Bissang, Kristaps Konstantinovs

9 April 2026	Fenerbahçe Beko (Turkish Basketball Federation)	69–74	(Spanish Basketball Federation) Real Madrid	Istanbul
19:45	Scoring by quarter: 21–19, 13–21, 24–14, 11–20
	Pts: Boston Jr. 21; Rebs: Melli 6 Asts: Baldwin 5 PIR: Boston Jr. 21	Boxscore	Pts: Campazzo 15; Rebs: Lyles, Tavares 5 Asts: Hezonja 5 PIR: Campazzo 18	Arena: Ülker Sports and Event Hall; Attendance: 12,803; Referees: Robert Lottermoser, Oļegs Latiševs, Marcin Kowalski

9 April 2026	EA7 Emporio Armani Milan (Italian Basketball Federation)	84–94	(German Basketball Federation) Bayern Munich	Assago
20:30	Scoring by quarter: 20–20, 14–32, 21–22, 29–20
	Pts: Shields 14; Rebs: Ellis 8 Asts: Ellis 7 PIR: Ellis 21	Boxscore	Pts: Obst 19; Rebs: Dimitrijević, Lučić 4 Asts: Obst 6 PIR: Dimitrijević 21	Arena: Unipol Forum; Attendance: 6,777; Referees: Carlos Peruga, Gytis Vilius, Rain Peerandi

9 April 2026	Valencia Basket (Spanish Basketball Federation)	102–84	(Hellenic Basketball Federation) Panathinaikos AKTOR	Valencia
20:45	Scoring by quarter: 27–23, 29–24, 26–22, 20–15
	Pts: Montero 22; Rebs: Reuvers 7 Asts: Montero 7 PIR: Montero 30	Boxscore	Pts: Hayes-Davis 19; Rebs: Hernangómez 7 Asts: Sloukas, Nunn 3 PIR: Hayes-Davis 17	Arena: Roig Arena; Attendance: 14,156; Referees: Mehdi Difallah, Tomislav Hordov, Hugues Thépénier

9 April 2026	Paris Basketball (French Federation of Basketball)	113–80	(Israeli Basketball Association) Maccabi Rapyd Tel Aviv	Paris
21:00	Scoring by quarter: 41–24, 20–14, 32–20, 20–22
	Pts: Robinson 25; Rebs: Faye 7 Asts: Robinson 6 PIR: Robinson 35	Boxscore	Pts: Walker 16; Rebs: Brissett 7 Asts: Clark 5 PIR: Brissett 16	Arena: Adidas Arena; Attendance: 4,626; Referees: Damir Javor, Sérgio Silva, Leandro Lezcano

10 April 2026	Monaco (French Federation of Basketball)	93–86	(Spanish Basketball Federation) Barcelona	Fontvieille
19:30	Scoring by quarter: 18–26, 28–18, 26–23, 21–19
	Pts: James, Okobo 16; Rebs: Blossomgame 7 Asts: Okobo 8 PIR: Okobo 21	Boxscore	Pts: Punter 27; Rebs: three players 5 Asts: Shengelia 7 PIR: Punter 29	Arena: Salle Gaston Médecin; Attendance: 5,000; Referees: Sreten Radović, Jakub Zamojski, Anne Panther

10 April 2026	Dubai Basketball (United Arab Emirates Basketball Association)	69–85	(Turkish Basketball Federation) Anadolu Efes	Sarajevo
20:00	Scoring by quarter: 20–24, 13–27, 21–13, 15–21
	Pts: Musa 13; Rebs: Kamenjaš 7 Asts: three players 4 PIR: Petrušev 13	Boxscore	Pts: Beaubois 18; Rebs: Jones 7 Asts: three players 4 PIR: Beaubois 21	Arena: Juan Antonio Samaranch Olympic Hall; Attendance: 4,968; Referees: Saša Pukl, Borys Ryzhyk, Vasiliki Tsaroucha

10 April 2026	Virtus Bologna (Italian Basketball Federation)	72–82	(Spanish Basketball Federation) Kosner Baskonia	Bologna
20:30	Scoring by quarter: 21–28, 18–16, 14–13, 19–25
	Pts: Alston 19; Rebs: Niang 9 Asts: Edwards 3 PIR: Niang 23	Boxscore	Pts: Omoruyi 22; Rebs: Frisch 8 Asts: Forrest 8 PIR: Omoruyi 24	Arena: Virtus Arena; Attendance: 6,071; Referees: Emin Moğulkoç, Piotr Pastusiak, Gentian Cici

10 April 2026	Partizan Mozzart Bet (Basketball Federation of Serbia)	74–83	(Lithuanian Basketball Federation) Žalgiris	Belgrade
20:30	Scoring by quarter: 22–26, 19–22, 16–15, 17–20
	Pts: Jones 15; Rebs: Fernando, Osetkowski 9 Asts: Jones 4 PIR: Bonga, Fernando 14	Boxscore	Pts: Francisco 18; Rebs: Wright 11; Asts: Francisco 6 PIR: Francisco 20	Arena: Belgrade Arena; Attendance: 20,006; Referees: Juan Carlos García, Seffi Shemmesh, Sergio Manuel

10 April 2026	LDLC ASVEL (French Federation of Basketball)	93–106	(Basketball Federation of Serbia) Crvena zvezda Meridianbet	Villeurbanne
20:45	Scoring by quarter: 26–26, 17–29, 28–19, 22–32
	Pts: Angola 22; Rebs: Harrison 6 Asts: Harrison 8 PIR: Harrison 29	Boxscore	Pts: Butler, Nwora 24; Rebs: Ojeleye 7 Asts: Miller-McIntyre 7 PIR: Butler 33	Arena: Astroballe; Attendance: 5,379; Referees: Emilio Pérez, Carlos Cortés, Adar Peer

=== Round 38 ===
16 April 2026	LDLC ASVEL (French Federation of Basketball)	76–81	(Turkish Basketball Federation) Fenerbahçe Beko	Décines-Charpieu
20:00	Scoring by quarter: 16–24, 26–24, 8–22, 26–11
	Pts: Harrison 25; Rebs: Eboua 8 Asts: Angola 7 PIR: Harrison 33	Boxscore	Pts: Horton-Tucker 21; Rebs: Melli 12; Asts: Hall 6 PIR: Melli 21	Arena: LDLC Arena; Attendance: 11,184; Referees: Miguel Ángel Pérez, Milivoje Jovčić, Luka Kardum

16 April 2026	Maccabi Rapyd Tel Aviv (Israeli Basketball Association)	85–89	(Italian Basketball Federation) Virtus Bologna	Belgrade
20:05	Scoring by quarter: 14–16, 22–24, 26–29, 23–20
	Pts: Walker 24; Rebs: Hoard 10; Asts: Blatt 10; PIR: Walker 22	Boxscore	Pts: Edwards 19; Rebs: Diarra 8 Asts: Alston 5 PIR: Edwards 25	Arena: Aleksandar Nikolić Hall; Attendance: 68; Referees: Tomislav Hordov, Milan Nedović, Jordi Aliaga

16 April 2026	Olympiacos (Hellenic Basketball Federation)	85–76	(Italian Basketball Federation) EA7 Emporio Armani Milan	Piraeus
20:15	Scoring by quarter: 26–23, 21–22, 21–10, 17–21
	Pts: Vezenkov 20; Rebs: Milutinov 15; Asts: Walkup 6 PIR: Milutinov 28	Boxscore	Pts: Shields 24; Rebs: Nebo 8 Asts: Ellis 8 PIR: Shields 17	Arena: Peace and Friendship Stadium; Attendance: 12,577; Referees: Emilio Pérez, Mehdi Difallah, Alberto Baena

16 April 2026	Partizan Mozzart Bet (Basketball Federation of Serbia)	91–79	(Spanish Basketball Federation) Kosner Baskonia	Belgrade
20:30	Scoring by quarter: 26–20, 18–19, 22–20, 25–20
	Pts: Jekiri 16; Rebs: Jones 7 Asts: Jones 6 PIR: Jekiri 21	Boxscore	Pts: Diakite 20; Rebs: Luwawu-Cabarrot 7 Asts: Simmons 5 PIR: Diakite 28	Arena: Belgrade Arena; Attendance: 11,992; Referees: Robert Lottermoser, Artūras Šukys, Amit Balak

16 April 2026	Real Madrid (Spanish Basketball Federation)	103–82	(Basketball Federation of Serbia) Crvena zvezda Meridianbet	Madrid
20:45	Scoring by quarter: 27–25, 29–19, 21–19, 26–19
	Pts: Hezonja 19; Rebs: Lyles, Maledon 5 Asts: Campazzo 8 PIR: Campazzo 21	Boxscore	Pts: Nwora 15; Rebs: Izundu, Miller-McIntyre 7 Asts: Miller-McIntyre 6 PIR: Moneke, Nwora 15	Arena: Movistar Arena; Attendance: 10,812; Referees: Borys Ryzhyk, Jakub Zamojski, Rain Peerandi

17 April 2026	Žalgiris (Lithuanian Basketball Federation)	85–79	(French Federation of Basketball) Paris Basketball	Kaunas
19:00	Scoring by quarter: 26–28, 27–17, 15–16, 17–18
	Pts: Francisco, Lô 21; Rebs: Wright 18; Asts: Francisco 5 PIR: Wright 43	Boxscore	Pts: Robinson 17; Rebs: five player 4 Asts: Robinson 8 PIR: Robinson, Stevens 21	Arena: Žalgirio Arena; Attendance: 15,428; Referees: Saša Pukl, Oļegs Latiševs, Anne Panther

17 April 2026	Monaco (French Federation of Basketball)	105–85	(Israeli Basketball Association) Hapoel IBI Tel Aviv	Fontvieille
19:30	Scoring by quarter: 27–17, 31–24, 25–20, 22–24
	Pts: Blossomgame 30; Rebs: Diallo 7 Asts: Strazel 9 PIR: Blossomgame, James 28	Boxscore	Pts: Jones 17; Rebs: Oturu 11; Asts: Jones 10; PIR: Jones 30	Arena: Salle Gaston Médecin; Attendance: 4,902; Referees: Juan Carlos García, Damir Javor, Manuel Attard

17 April 2026	Dubai Basketball (United Arab Emirates Basketball Association)	85–95	(Spanish Basketball Federation) Valencia Basket	Zenica
20:00	Scoring by quarter: 19–24, 28–21, 20–34, 18–16
	Pts: Musa 21; Rebs: Musa 9 Asts: Musa 5 PIR: Musa 24	Boxscore	Pts: Badio 20; Rebs: three players 5 Asts: Taylor 4 PIR: Badio 20	Arena: Arena Zenica; Attendance: 5,996; Referees: Emin Moğulkoç, Gytis Vilius, Sašo Petek

17 April 2026	Panathinaikos AKTOR (Hellenic Basketball Federation)	97–62	(Turkish Basketball Federation) Anadolu Efes	Marousi
20:15	Scoring by quarter: 20–16, 25–22, 26–5, 26–19
	Pts: Rogkavopoulos 24; Rebs: Lessort 7 Asts: Sloukas 8 PIR: Rogkavopoulos 22	Boxscore	Pts: Loyd 15; Rebs: Poirier 8 Asts: Loyd, Weiler-Babb 3 PIR: Hazer, Poirier 14	Arena: Telekom Center Athens; Attendance: 18,699; Referees: Sreten Radović, Carlos Cortés, Joseph Bissang

17 April 2026	Barcelona (Spanish Basketball Federation)	95–69	(German Basketball Federation) Bayern Munich	Barcelona
20:30	Scoring by quarter: 20–19, 22–12, 26–17, 27–21
	Pts: Clyburn 22; Rebs: Fall 12; Asts: Satoranský, Clyburn 5 PIR: Clyburn 33	Boxscore	Pts: Mike 17; Rebs: Lučić 7 Asts: Lučić, Rathan-Mayes 3 PIR: Mike 16	Arena: Palau Blaugrana; Attendance: 5,930; Referees: Ilija Belošević, Miloš Koljenšić, Marcin Kowalski
