= 2020–21 Aris Thessaloniki B.C. season =

Aris Thessaloniki
2020–21 season
- Head coach: Savvas Kamperidis
- Arena: Nick Galis Hall
- Basket League: 9th
- Greek Cup: Phase 2

Last season Aris Thessaloniki finished in the 13th place (the league did not compete after coronavirus lockdown in March 2020) of the table but avoided the relegation with Greek Basket League's decision.

For this reason Aris Thessaloniki is participating in the top-tier level Greek Basket League for 67th time in a row.

The team also competed in the Greek Basketball Cup where was eliminated by Ionikos Nikaias in Phase 2.

Due to the COVID-19 pandemic all matches are played behind closed doors and with weekly tests for the teams.

== First-team squad ==
#	Name	Nationality	Position(s)	Height	Date of birth (age)
1	Dimitrios Stamatis	(Greece)	PG / SG	1.88 m	January 12, 1996 (aged 25)
4	Diamantis Slaftsakis	(Greece)	SF / PF	2.02 m	July 27, 1994 (aged 26)
7	Dimitris Flionis	(Greece)	PG / SG	1.90 m	April 8, 1997 (aged 24)
8	Milan Milošević	(Bosnia and Herzegovina)	PF / SF	2.05 m	September 26, 1985 (aged 35)
9	Dimitrios Charitopoulos	(Greece)	C / PF	2.07 m	November 14, 1983 (aged 37)
10	Giannis Sidiroilias	(Greece)	SF	2.01 m	October 29, 2001 (aged 19)
12	Kyriakos Petanidis	(Greece)	PF	2.05 m	March 30, 2001 (aged 20)
13	Dimitris Kalaitzidis	(Greece)	SG / SF	1.98 m	February 15, 1985 (aged 36)
14	Georgios Georgakis	(Greece)	C	2.05 m	March 18, 1991 (aged 30)
15	Mario Chalmers	(United States)	PG	1.88 m	May 19, 1986 (aged 35)
16	Omiros Netzipoglou	(Greece)	SG	1.93 m	November 18, 2002 (aged 18)
18	Vladimir Dragičević	(Montenegro)	PF / C	2.06 m	May 30, 1986 (aged 35)
23	Mario Little	(United States)	SG / SF	1.98 m	December 29, 1987 (aged 33)
33	Kostas Tsirogiannis	(Greece)	PG	1.88 m	March 6, 2000 (aged 21)

=== Roster changes ===
==== Out ====
Position(s)	#	Player	Moving to	Ref.
SG	0	(United States) Jamal Shuler	Free Agent	
SG / SF	25	(United States) Quenton DeCosey	Free Agent	
PF	11	(Greece) Ioannis Kouzeloglou	(France) Élan Béarnais	

=== On loan ===
Aris B.C. players out on loan
Nat.	Player	Position	Team	On loan until
(Greece)	Kostas Vlasios	PG	(Greece) H.A.N.TH.	30 June 2021

== Competitions ==
=== Overall ===
Competition	Started round	Current position / round	Final position / round	First match	Last match
Greek Basket League	Matchday 1	—	9th	24 October 2020	17 April 2021
Greek Basketball Cup	Phase 2	—	Phase 2	26 September 2020	26 September 2020

Updated to match played 17 April 2021
Source: Competitions

=== Overview ===
Competition	Record							
Competition	Pld	W	D	L	PF	PA	PD	Win %
Greek Basket League	22	7	0	15	1,622	1,704	−82	31.82
Greek Basketball Cup	1	0	0	1	73	85	−12	0.00
Total	23	7	0	16	1,695	1,789	−94	30.43

Last updated: 17 April 2021
Source: Competitions

=== Greek Basket League ===
==== Regular season ====
===== Standings =====
Pos	Team	Pld	W	L	PF	PA	PD	Pts	Qualification or relegation
1	Panathinaikos OPAP	22	20	2	1949	1578	+371	42	Advanced to playoffs
2	Lavrio Megabolt	22	17	5	1810	1722	+88	39	Advanced to playoffs
3	Promitheas Patras	22	16	6	1768	1677	+91	38	Advanced to playoffs
4	AEK Athens	22	14	8	1813	1666	+147	36	Advanced to playoffs
5	PAOK	22	13	9	1736	1729	+7	35	Advanced to playoffs
6	Peristeri	22	11	11	1615	1634	−19	33	Advanced to playoffs
7	Kolossos H Hotels	22	8	14	1720	1703	+17	30	Advanced to playoffs
8	Ionikos Hellenic Coin	22	8	14	1699	1789	−90	30	Advanced to playoffs
9	Aris Thessaloniki	22	7	15	1622	1704	−82	29	
10	Iraklis	22	7	15	1617	1769	−152	29	
11	Larisa Bread factory	22	6	16	1633	1785	−152	28	
12	Messolonghi BAXI	22	5	17	1594	1820	−226	27	Relegated to Greek A2 Basket League

Updated to match(es) played on 10 April 2021. Source: ESAKE

===== Results overview =====
Opposition	Home score	Away score	Double
AEK Athens	68–73	67–84	135–157
Ionikos Hellenic Coin	74–62	64–68	138–130
Iraklis	81–75	76–54	157–129
Kolossos H Hotels	74–84	72–83	146–167
Larisa Bread factory	70–52	88–84	158–136
Lavrio Megabolt	89–94	71–92	160–186
Messolonghi BAXI	77–48	70–73	147–121
Peristeri	71–84	65–82	136–166
Panathinaikos OPAP	75–93	72–94	147–187
PAOK	71–77	64–75	135–152
Promitheas Patras	94–83	69–90	163–173

===== Matches =====
24 October 2020 1	Messolonghi BAXI	73–70	Aris Thessaloniki	Agrinio
17:15	Scoring by quarter: 17–19, 20–21, 19–9, 17–21
ERTFLIX	Pts: Ioannis Agravanis 15; Rebs: Chad Brown 10; Asts: Jazzmarr Ferguson 6		Pts: Dimitris Flionis 18; Rebs: Vladimir Dragičević, Quenton DeCosey 5 Asts: Dimitris Flionis 5	Arena: Michalis Kousis Agrinio Indoor Hall

10 November 2020 2	Aris Thessaloniki	81–75	Iraklis	Thessaloniki
17:00	Scoring by quarter: 24–22, 16–22, 21–22, 20–9
ERT3	Pts: Quenton DeCosey 20; Rebs: Ioannis Kouzeloglou 9 Asts: Dimitris Flionis 5		Pts: Olivier Hanlan 19; Rebs: Vassilis Kavvadas 13; Asts: (3 players) 2	Arena: Nick Galis Hall

5 December 2020 6	Aris Thessaloniki	94–83	Promitheas Patras	Thessaloniki
17:00	Scoring by quarter: 29–17, 17–25, 26–26, 22–15
ERT SPORTS	Pts: Quenton DeCosey 21; Rebs: Milan Milošević 12; Asts: Mario Little 3		Pts: Ian Miller 21; Rebs: Danny Agbelese 10; Asts: Michalis Lountzis, Vangelis Mantzaris 3	Arena: Nick Galis Hall

9 December 2020 3	Lavrio Megabolt	92–71	Aris Thessaloniki	Lavrio
15:00	Scoring by quarter: 22–18, 31–14, 15–19, 24–20
ΕRΤ3 Live	Pts: Glenn Cosey 22; Rebs: Devin Davis 9 Asts: Vassilis Mouratos 10	Boxscore	Pts: Ioannis Kouzeloglou 19; Rebs: Vladimir Dragičević 7 Asts: Dimitris Flionis 6	Arena: Lavrio Indoor Hall

13 December 2020 7	PAOK	75–64	Aris Thessaloniki	Thessaloniki
16:00	Scoring by quarter: 27–24, 20–11, 16–11, 12–18
ΕRΤ3 Live	Pts: Georgios Tsalmpouris 22; Rebs: Dimitris Kaklamanakis 9 Asts: Jermaine Love 4	Boxscore	Pts: Ioannis Kouzeloglou 16; Rebs: Ioannis Kouzeloglou, Vladimir Dragičević 6 Asts: Dimitris Flionis 3	Arena: P.A.O.K. Sports Arena

16 December 2020 5	Larisa Bread factory	84–88	Aris Thessaloniki	Larissa
20:00	Scoring by quarter: 21–23, 26–19, 21–24, 16–22
ΕRΤ3 Live	Pts: Brandon Rush 20; Rebs: James Webb 14; Asts: Kostas Papadakis 5	Boxscore	Pts: Jamal Shuler 18; Rebs: Ioannis Kouzeloglou 6 Asts: Ioannis Kouzeloglou 4	Arena: Larissa Neapolis Indoor Arena

20 December 2020 8	AEK Athens	84–67	Aris Thessaloniki	Athens
17:00	Scoring by quarter: 15–16, 27–15, 21–17, 21–19
ΕRΤ3 Live	Pts: Keith Langford 16; Rebs: Jonas Mačiulis 8 Asts: Keith Langford 4	Boxscore	Pts: Mario Chalmers 16; Rebs: Ioannis Kouzeloglou 12; Asts: Mario Chalmers 3	Arena: O.A.C.A. Olympic Indoor Hall

26 December 2020 9	Aris Thessaloniki	74–84	Kolossos H Hotels	Thessaloniki
20:00	Scoring by quarter: 20–22, 15–21, 14–18, 25–23
ΕRΤ3 Live	Pts: Mario Chalmers 19; Rebs: Ioannis Kouzeloglou 15; Asts: (3 players) 3	Boxscore	Pts: Kenny Goins 34; Rebs: Kerem Kanter 9 Asts: Vassilis Xanthopoulos 8	Arena: Nick Galis Hall

3 January 2021 10	Ionikos Hellenic Coin	68–64	Aris Thessaloniki	Piraeus
15:00	Scoring by quarter: 18–14, 16–20, 19–17, 15–13
ERTFLIX	Pts: Toarlyn Fitzpatrick 15; Rebs: Toarlyn Fitzpatrick 8 Asts: Adam Smith 4	Boxscore	Pts: Jamal Shuler 18; Rebs: Diamantis Slaftsakis, Ioannis Kouzeloglou 6 Asts: Dimitrios Charitopoulos, Mario Chalmers 3	Arena: Nikaias Platonas Indoor Hall

9 January 2021 11	Aris Thessaloniki	71–84	Peristeri	Thessaloniki
19:30	Scoring by quarter: 10–23, 25–23, 22–21, 14–17
ERT3 live	Pts: Mario Chalmers 14; Rebs: Ioannis Kouzeloglou 9 Asts: (4 players) 2	Boxscore	Pts: Tre McLean 19; Rebs: Ioannis Bourousis 9 Asts: Zois Karampelas 6	Arena: Nick Galis Hall

17 January 2021 4	Aris Thessaloniki	75–93	Panathinaikos OPAP	Thessaloniki
19:00	Scoring by quarter: 20–23, 16–24, 25–25, 14–21
	Pts: Quenton DeCosey 22; Rebs: Dimitrios Charitopoulos 7 Asts: (3 players) 2	Boxscore	Pts: Dinos Mitoglou 15; Rebs: Ben Bentil 10; Asts: Shelvin Mack 8	Arena: Nick Galis Hall

23 January 2021 12	Aris Thessaloniki	77–48	Messolonghi BAXI	Thessaloniki
17:00	Scoring by quarter: 19–13, 23–16, 23–9, 12–10
ERTFLIX	Pts: Ioannis Kouzeloglou 14; Rebs: Ioannis Kouzeloglou 11; Asts: Jamal Shuler 5	Boxscore	Pts: Toddrick Gotcher 13; Rebs: Darel Poirier 9 Asts: Eugene Lawrence 4	Arena: Nick Galis Hall

6 February 2021 14	Aris Thessaloniki	89–94	Lavrio Megabolt	Thessaloniki
17:00	Scoring by quarter: 18–17, 25–28, 17–22, 29–27
ERT3 live	Pts: Mario Chalmers 21; Rebs: Ioannis Kouzeloglou 10; Asts: Dimitris Flionis 5	Boxscore	Pts: Alpha Diallo 23; Rebs: Stratos Voulgaropoulos 7 Asts: Glenn Cosey 6	Arena: Nick Galis Hall

28 February 2021 15	Panathinaikos OPAP	94–72	Aris Thessaloniki	Athens
20:00	Scoring by quarter: 19–19, 24–15, 27–14, 24–24
ERT3 live	Pts: T. J. Bray 25; Rebs: Georgios Papagiannis 7 Asts: Lefteris Bochoridis 7	Boxscore	Pts: Ioannis Kouzeloglou 16; Rebs: Ioannis Kouzeloglou 10; Asts: Dimitris Flionis 5	Arena: O.A.C.A. Olympic Indoor Hall

6 March 2021 16	Aris Thessaloniki	70–52	Larisa Bread factory	Thessaloniki
17:00	Scoring by quarter: 22–22, 18–7, 16–8, 14–15
ERTFLIX	Pts: Vladimir Dragičević 14; Rebs: Vladimir Dragičević 9 Asts: Dimitris Flionis, Quenton DeCosey 4	Boxscore	Pts: Jerry Smith 16; Rebs: Wesley Gordon 8 Asts: Wes Washpun 3	Arena: Nick Galis Hall

10 March 2021 13	Iraklis	54–76	Aris Thessaloniki	Thessaloniki
17:00	Scoring by quarter: 13–20, 16–18, 5–21, 20–17
ERT3 live	Pts: Vassilis Kavvadas, Olivier Hanlan 12; Rebs: Vassilis Kavvadas 9 Asts: Josh Hagins 8	Boxscore	Pts: Mario Chalmers 13; Rebs: Dimitris Flionis 8 Asts: Dimitris Flionis, Mario Chalmers 3	Arena: Ivanofeio Sports Arena

20 March 2021 18	Aris Thessaloniki	71–77	PAOK	Thessaloniki
20:00	Scoring by quarter: 18–26, 19–11, 24–14, 10–26
ERT3 live	Pts: Dimitris Flionis 13; Rebs: Vladimir Dragičević 9 Asts: Vladimir Dragičević 4	Boxscore	Pts: Elston Turner 17; Rebs: Beau Beech, Dimitris Kaklamanakis 9 Asts: Jermaine Love 6	Arena: Nick Galis Hall

27 March 2021 19	Aris Thessaloniki	68–73	AEK Athens	Thessaloniki
17:00	Scoring by quarter: 15–18, 12–16, 22–23, 19–16
ERT3 live	Pts: Mario Chalmers 16; Rebs: Milan Milošević 13; Asts: Milan Milošević 3	Boxscore	Pts: Matt Lojeski 16; Rebs: Dimitrios Mavroeidis 7 Asts: Nikos Zisis 4	Arena: Nick Galis Hall

13 March 2021 17	Promitheas Patras	90–69	Aris Thessaloniki	Patras
17:00	Scoring by quarter: 19–26, 31–14, 15–20, 25–9
ERTFLIX	Pts: Jerian Grant 18; Rebs: Danny Agbelese 4 Asts: Jerian Grant 8	Boxscore	Pts: Vladimir Dragičević 18; Rebs: Vladimir Dragičević 8 Asts: Quenton DeCosey 4	Arena: Dimitris Tofalos Arena

3 April 2021 20	Kolossos H Hotels	83–72	Aris Thessaloniki	Rhodes
16:00	Scoring by quarter: 22–17, 20–23, 20–11, 21–21
ERTFLIX	Pts: Theodoros Zaras 20; Rebs: Kerem Kanter 10; Asts: Vassilis Xanthopoulos 9	Boxscore	Pts: Milan Milošević, Mario Chalmers 17; Rebs: Milan Milošević 11; Asts: (3 players) 3	Arena: Kallithea Palais des Sports

10 April 2021 21	Aris Thessaloniki	74–62	Ionikos Hellenic Coin	Thessaloniki
17:00	Scoring by quarter: 20–18, 14–14, 27–21, 13–9
ERT3 live	Pts: Omiros Netzipoglou 22; Rebs: Milan Milošević 9 Asts: Mario Chalmers 7	Boxscore	Pts: Vassilis Toliopoulos, Jeremy Hollowell 17; Rebs: Jeremy Hollowell 8 Asts: Vassilis Toliopoulos, Muhaymin Mustafa 3	Arena: Nick Galis Hall

17 April 2021 22	Peristeri	83–65	Aris Thessaloniki	Athens
20:00	Scoring by quarter: 20–18, 19–17, 22–15, 21–15
ERTFLIX	Pts: Jorge Gutiérrez 13; Rebs: Marvin Jones 9 Asts: Gaios Skordilis, Marvin Jones 4	Boxscore	Pts: Mario Little 17; Rebs: Vladimir Dragičević 7 Asts: Mario Chalmers, Mario Little 3	Arena: Peristeri Arena

=== Greek Cup ===
==== Phase 2 ====
26 September 2020 Phase 2	Ionikos Hellenic Coin	85–73	Aris Thessaloniki	Nikaia
17:00	Scoring by quarter: 19–19, 19–18, 25–17, 22–19
	Pts: Adam Smith 20; Rebs: Toarlyn Fitzpatrick, Nikos Chougkaz 6 Asts: Nick Zeisloft 4		Pts: Milan Milošević, Mario Chalmers 15; Rebs: Milan Milošević 8 Asts: (3 players) 3	Arena: Nikaias Platonas Indoor Fitness Center

== Players' statistics ==
=== Basket League ===
#	Player	GP	PTS	PPG	TR	RPG	DR	OR	AST	APG	STL	SPG	BLK	BPG
0	(United States) Jamal Shuler	13	75	5.77	21	1.62	19	2	22	1.69	9	0.69	1	0.08
1	(Greece) Dimitrios Stamatis	20	93	4.65	22	1.10	18	4	23	1.15	7	0.35	0	0.00
4	(Greece) Diamantis Slaftsakis	21	78	3.71	49	2.33	32	17	13	0.62	16	0.76	13	0.62
7	(Greece) Dimitris Flionis	21	113	5.38	57	2.71	48	9	58	2.76	28	1.33	4	0.19
8	(Bosnia and Herzegovina) Milan Milošević	16	154	9.63	94	5.88	58	36	13	0.81	10	0.63	2	0.13
9	(Greece) Dimitrios Charitopoulos	21	66	3.14	37	1.76	21	16	6	0.29	7	0.33	1	0.05
10	(Greece) Giannis Sidiroilias	9	13	1.44	7	0.78	3	4	2	0.22	3	0.33	1	0.11
11	(Greece) Ioannis Kouzeloglou	21	220	10.48	152	7.24	113	39	16	0.76	11	0.52	5	0.24
12	(Greece) Kyriakos Petanidis	3	3	1.00	1	0.33	1	0	1	0.33	0	0.00	0	0.00
13	(Greece) Dimitris Kalaitzidis	12	9	0.75	4	0.33	3	1	12	1.00	1	0.08	0	0.00
14	(Greece) Georgios Georgakis	5	8	1.60	5	1.00	2	3	0	0.00	0	0.00	1	0.20
15	(United States) Mario Chalmers	22	230	10.45	42	1.91	34	8	49	2.23	34	1.55	1	0.05
16	(Greece) Omiros Netzipoglou	3	32	10.67	8	2.67	3	5	4	1.33	2	0.67	0	0.00
18	(Montenegro) Vladimir Dragičević	16	142	8.88	89	5.56	56	33	22	1.38	7	0.44	2	0.13
23	(United States) Mario Little	22	179	8.14	36	1.64	26	10	34	1.55	16	0.73	1	0.05
25	(United States) Quenton DeCosey	20	207	10.35	69	3.45	48	21	28	1.40	22	1.10	4	0.20
33	(Greece) Kostas Tsirogiannis	0	0	0.00	0	0.00	0	0	0	0.00	0	0.00	0	0.00
	Team totals	22	1622	73.73	693	31.50	485	208	303	13.77	173	7.86	36	1.64

==== Shooting ====
#	Player	GP	FTM	FTA	FT%	2PM	2PA	2P%	3PM	3PA	3P%
0	(United States) Jamal Shuler	13	18	23	78.26	12	29	41.38	11	43	25.58
1	(Greece) Dimitrios Stamatis	20	27	35	77.14	6	13	46.15	18	50	36.00
4	(Greece) Diamantis Slaftsakis	21	32	41	78.05	20	51	39.22	2	9	22.22
7	(Greece) Dimitris Flionis	21	20	30	66.67	21	51	41.18	17	56	30.36
8	(Bosnia and Herzegovina) Milan Milošević	16	42	67	62.69	47	90	52.22	6	20	30.00
9	(Greece) Dimitrios Charitopoulos	21	14	22	63.64	20	39	51.28	4	23	17.39
10	(Greece) Giannis Sidiroilias	9	2	4	50.00	4	7	57.14	1	2	50.00
11	(Greece) Ioannis Kouzeloglou	21	54	69	78.26	59	112	52.68	16	58	27.59
12	(Greece) Kyriakos Petanidis	3	1	2	50.00	1	1	100.00	0	0	0.00
13	(Greece) Dimitris Kalaitzidis	12	1	2	50.00	1	3	33.33	2	11	18.18
14	(Greece) Georgios Georgakis	5	0	1	0.00	4	10	40.00	0	0	0.00
15	(United States) Mario Chalmers	22	64	82	78.05	32	62	51.61	34	91	37.36
16	(Greece) Omiros Netzipoglou	3	8	11	72.73	9	16	56.25	2	5	40.00
18	(Montenegro) Vladimir Dragičević	16	14	23	60.87	64	108	59.26	0	1	0.00
23	(United States) Mario Little	23	26	34	76.47	24	65	36.92	35	94	37.23
25	(United States) Quenton DeCosey	20	33	45	73.33	51	106	48.11	24	65	36.92
33	(Greece) Kostas Tsirogiannis	0	0	0	0.00	0	0	0.00	0	0	0.00
	Team totals	22	356	491	72.51	375	763	49.15	172	528	32.58

Last updated: 26 December 2020
Source: ESAKE

=== Greek Cup ===
#	Player	GP	PTS	PPG	TR	RPG	DR	OR	AST	APG	STL	SPG	BLK	BPG
0	(United States) Jamal Shuler	1	13	13.00	2	2.00	1	1	3	3.00	0	0.00	0	0.00
1	(Greece) Dimitrios Stamatis	1	4	4.00	1	1.00	1	0	0	0.00	0	0.00	0	0.00
4	(Greece) Diamantis Slaftsakis	1	2	2.00	1	1.00	1	0	1	1.00	0	0.00	0	0.00
7	(Greece) Dimitris Flionis	1	8	8.00	4	4.00	2	2	2	2.00	1	1.00	0	0.00
8	(Bosnia and Herzegovina) Milan Milošević	1	15	15.00	8	8.00	7	1	2	2.00	1	1.00	0	0.00
9	(Greece) Dimitrios Charitopoulos	1	3	3.00	2	2.00	0	2	0	0.00	0	0.00	0	0.00
10	(Greece) Giannis Sidiroilias	0	0	0.00	0	0.00	0	0	0	0.00	0	0.00	0	0.00
11	(Greece) Ioannis Kouzeloglou	1	2	2.00	1	1.00	1	0	0	0.00	0	0.00	0	0.00
13	(Greece) Dimitris Kalaitzidis	0	0	0.00	0	0.00	0	0	0	0.00	0	0.00	0	0.00
14	(Greece) Georgios Georgakis	0	0	0.00	0	0.00	0	0	0	0.00	0	0.00	0	0.00
15	(United States) Mario Chalmers	1	15	15.00	1	1.00	1	0	3	3.00	1	1.00	0	0.00
16	(Greece) Omiros Netzipoglou	0	0	0.00	0	0.00	0	0	0	0.00	0	0.00	0	0.00
18	(Montenegro) Vladimir Dragičević	1	6	6.00	4	4.00	4	0	3	3.00	0	0.00	0	0.00
23	(United States) Mario Little	0	0	0.00	0	0.00	0	0	0	0.00	0	0.00	0	0.00
25	(United States) Quenton DeCosey	1	5	5.00	3	3.00	3	0	1	1.00	0	0.00	0	0.00
33	(Greece) Kostas Tsirogiannis	0	0	0.00	0	0.00	0	0	0	0.00	0	0.00	0	0.00
	Team				4		2	2						
	Team totals	1	73	73.00	31	31.00	23	8	15	15.00	3	3.00	0	0.00

==== Shooting ====
#	Player	GP	FTM	FTA	FT%	2PM	2PA	2P%	3PM	3PA	3P%
0	(United States) Jamal Shuler	1	3	3	100.00	2	4	50.00	2	4	50.00
1	(Greece) Dimitrios Stamatis	1	0	0	0.00	2	2	100.00	0	2	0.00
4	(Greece) Diamantis Slaftsakis	1	0	0	0.00	1	1	100.00	0	0	0.00
7	(Greece) Dimitris Flionis	1	2	4	50.00	3	4	75.00	0	3	00.00
8	(Bosnia and Herzegovina) Milan Milošević	1	5	6	83.33	5	6	83.33	0	0	0.00
9	(Greece) Dimitrios Charitopoulos	1	0	0	0.00	0	3	0.00	1	1	100.00
10	(Greece) Giannis Sidiroilias	0	0	0	0.00	0	0	0.00	0	0	0.00
11	(Greece) Ioannis Kouzeloglou	1	2	2	100.00	0	0	0.00	0	0	0.00
13	(Greece) Dimitris Kalaitzidis	0	0	0	0.00	0	0	0.00	0	0	0.00
14	(Greece) Georgios Georgakis	0	0	0	0.00	0	0	0.00	0	0	0.00
15	(United States) Mario Chalmers	2	10	11	90.91	1	3	33.33	1	5	20.00
16	(Greece) Omiros Netzipoglou	0	0	0	0.00	0	0	0.00	0	0	0.00
18	(Montenegro) Vladimir Dragičević	1	6	6	100.00	0	1	0.00	0	0	0.00
23	(United States) Mario Little	0	0	0	0.00	0	0	0.00	0	0	0.00
25	(United States) Quenton DeCosey	1	0	0	0.00	1	4	25.00	1	3	33.33
33	(Greece) Kostas Tsirogiannis	0	0	0	0.00	0	0	0.00	0	0	0.00
	Team totals	1	28	32	87.50	15	28	53.57	5	18	27.78

Last updated: 26 September 2020
Source: sportstats.gr
