= List of 2025–26 EuroLeague transactions =

This is a list of all personnel changes for the 2025 EuroLeague off-season and 2025–26 EuroLeague season.

== Retirements ==
Date	Name	EuroLeague Team(s) and played (years)	Age	Notes	Ref.
June 22	(Greece) Ioannis Papapetrou	(Hellenic Basketball Federation) Olympiacos (2013–2018); (Hellenic Basketball Federation) Panathinaikos (2018–2022, 2023–2025); (Basketball Federation of Serbia) Partizan (2022–2023)	31	EuroLeague champion (2024)	
June 26	(Serbia) Miloš Teodosić	(Hellenic Basketball Federation) Olympiacos (2007–2011); (Russian Basketball Federation) CSKA Moscow (2011–2017); (Italian Basketball Federation) Virtus Bologna (2022–2023); (Basketball Federation of Serbia) Crvena zvezda (2023–2025)	38	EuroLeague champion (2016); EuroLeague MVP (2010); EuroLeague 2010–20 All-Decade Team (2020); 3× All-EuroLeague First Team (2010, 2015, 2016); 3× All-EuroLeague Second Team (2012, 2013, 2017); 2× EuroLeague assists leader (2015, 2017)	
June 29	(Croatia) Bojan Bogdanović	(Spanish Basketball Federation) Real Madrid (2007–2008); (Croatian Basketball Federation) Cibona (2009–2011); (Turkish Basketball Federation) Fenerbahçe (2011–2014)	36		
July 22	(Spain) Álex Abrines	(Spanish Basketball Federation) Málaga (2011–2012); (Spanish Basketball Federation) Barcelona (2012–2016, 2019–2025)	31	EuroLeague Rising Star Award (2016)	
August 18	(Italy) Marco Belinelli	(Italian Basketball Federation) Virtus Bologna (2002–2003, 2023–2025); (Italian Basketball Federation) Fortitudo Bologna (2003–2007)	39		
October 12	(United States) Deshaun Thomas	(French Federation of Basketball) Nanterre 92 (2013–2014); (Spanish Basketball Federation) Barcelona (2014–2015); (Turkish Basketball Federation) Anadolu Efes (2016–2017); (Israeli Basketball Association) Maccabi Tel Aviv (2017–2018); (Hellenic Basketball Federation) Panathinaikos (2018–2020); (German Basketball Federation) Bayern Munich (2021–2022); (Italian Basketball Federation) Olimpia Milano (2022–2023); (French Federation of Basketball) ASVEL (2024)	34		
January 13	(France) Fabien Causeur	(French Federation of Basketball) Cholet (2010–2011); (Spanish Basketball Federation) Baskonia (2012–2016); (German Basketball Federation) Bamberg (2016–2017); (Spanish Basketball Federation) Real Madrid (2017–2024); (Italian Basketball Federation) Olimpia Milano (2024–2025)	38	2× EuroLeague champion (2018, 2023)	
May 4	(Italy) Achille Polonara	(Spanish Basketball Federation) Baskonia (2019–2021); (Turkish Basketball Federation) Fenerbahçe (2021–2022); (Lithuanian Basketball Federation) Žalgiris (2022–2023); (Turkish Basketball Federation) Anadolu Efes (2022–2023); (Italian Basketball Federation) Virtus Bologna (2023–2025)	34		

== Managerial changes ==
Team	Outgoing manager	Manner of departure	Date of vacancy	Position in table	Replaced with	Date of appointment
(French Federation of Basketball) Paris Basketball	(Brazilian Basketball Confederation) Tiago Splitter	Signed by Portland Trail Blazers	11 June 2025	Pre-season	(Italian Basketball Federation) Francesco Tabellini	30 June 2025
(Turkish Basketball Federation) Anadolu Efes	(Italy) Luca Banchi	Mutual agreement	15 June 2025	Pre-season	(Basketball Federation of Serbia) Igor Kokoškov	2 July 2025
(Lithuanian Basketball Federation) Žalgiris	(Italian Basketball Federation) Andrea Trinchieri	Mutual agreement	23 June 2025	Pre-season	(Lithuanian Basketball Federation) Tomas Masiulis	28 June 2025
(Spanish Basketball Federation) Baskonia	(Spanish Basketball Federation) Pablo Laso	Sacked	8 August 2025	Pre-season	(Italian Basketball Federation) Paolo Galbiati	8 August 2025
(Basketball Federation of Serbia) Crvena zvezda	(Hellenic Basketball Federation) Ioannis Sfairopoulos	Sacked	9 October 2025	19th (0–2)	(Basketball Federation of Serbia) Saša Obradović	11 October 2025
(Spanish Basketball Federation) Barcelona	(Spanish Basketball Federation) Joan Peñarroya	Sacked	9 November 2025	9th (5–4)	(Spanish Basketball Federation) Xavi Pascual	13 November 2025
(Italian Basketball Federation) Olimpia Milano	(Italian Basketball Federation) Ettore Messina	Resigned	24 November 2025	11th (6–6)	(Italian Basketball Federation) Giuseppe Poeta	24 November 2025
(Basketball Federation of Serbia) Partizan	(Basketball Federation of Serbia) Željko Obradović	Resigned	26 November 2025	18th (4–9)	(Spanish Basketball Federation) Joan Peñarroya	23 December 2025
(Turkish Basketball Federation) Anadolu Efes	(Basketball Federation of Serbia) Igor Kokoškov	Sacked	27 November 2025	15th (5–8)	(Spanish Basketball Federation) Pablo Laso	13 December 2025
(German Basketball Federation) Bayern Munich	(Canada Basketball) Gordon Herbert	Sacked	20 December 2025	19th (5–12)	(Basketball Federation of Serbia) Svetislav Pešić	22 December 2025
(French Federation of Basketball) Monaco	(Hellenic Basketball Federation) Vassilis Spanoulis	Resigned	11 March 2026	9th (16–14)	(Georgian Basketball Federation) Manuchar Markoishvili	12 March 2026
(French Federation of Basketball) Paris Basketball	(Italian Basketball Federation) Francesco Tabellini	Sacked	23 March 2026	17th (12–21)	(German Basketball Federation) Julius Thomas	23 March 2026
(Italian Basketball Federation) Virtus Bologna	(Basketball Federation of Montenegro) Duško Ivanović	Sacked	27 March 2026	15th (13–20)	(Basketball Federation of Serbia) Nenad Jakovljević	27 March 2026
(United Arab Emirates Basketball Association) Dubai Basketball	(Basketball Federation of Slovenia) Jurica Golemac	Sacked	12 April 2026	11th (19–18)	(Basketball Federation of Slovenia) Aleksander Sekulić	13 April 2026

== Player movements ==
=== Between two EuroLeague teams ===
Date	Player	From	To	Contract years	Ref.
Off-season
June 24	(Nigeria) Chima Moneke	(Spanish Basketball Federation) Baskonia	(Basketball Federation of Serbia) Crvena zvezda	2	
June 25	(Argentina) (Italian Basketball Federation) Luca Vildoza	(Hellenic Basketball Federation) Olympiacos	(Italian Basketball Federation) Virtus Bologna	3	
June 25	(United States) Nigel Williams-Goss	(Hellenic Basketball Federation) Olympiacos	(Lithuanian Basketball Federation) Žalgiris	2+1	
June 26	(United States) T. J. Shorts	(French Federation of Basketball) Paris	(Hellenic Basketball Federation) Panathinaikos	2	
June 27	(United States) Jabari Parker	(Spanish Basketball Federation) Barcelona	(Basketball Federation of Serbia) Partizan	2	
June 30	(Central African Republic) (United States) Kevarrius Hayes	(French Federation of Basketball) Paris	(French Federation of Basketball) Monaco	2	
June 30	(Nigeria) Semi Ojeleye	(Spanish Basketball Federation) Valencia	(Basketball Federation of Serbia) Crvena zvezda		
June 30	(United States) (Cyprus) Moses Wright	(Hellenic Basketball Federation) Olympiacos	(Lithuanian Basketball Federation) Žalgiris	1	
July 2	(Serbia) Marko Gudurić	(Turkish Basketball Federation) Fenerbahçe	(Italian Basketball Federation) Olimpia Milano		
July 2	(United States) Tyson Ward	(French Federation of Basketball) Paris	(Hellenic Basketball Federation) Olympiacos	2	
July 3	(Finland) Mikael Jantunen	(French Federation of Basketball) Paris	(Turkish Basketball Federation) Fenerbahçe	2	
July 3	(France) Neal Sako	(French Federation of Basketball) ASVEL	(Spanish Basketball Federation) Valencia	2	
July 4	(United States) Derek Willis	(Turkish Basketball Federation) Anadolu Efes	(French Federation of Basketball) Paris	2	
July 6	(United States) Elijah Bryant	(Turkish Basketball Federation) Anadolu Efes	(Israeli Basketball Association) Hapoel Tel Aviv	3	
July 6	(Nigeria) Daniel Oturu	(Turkish Basketball Federation) Anadolu Efes	(Israeli Basketball Association) Hapoel Tel Aviv	3	
July 7	(South Sudan) Wenyen Gabriel	(Hellenic Basketball Federation) Panathinaikos	(German Basketball Federation) Bayern Munich	2	
July 7	(France) Théo Maledon	(French Federation of Basketball) ASVEL	(Spanish Basketball Federation) Real Madrid	2	
July 7	(Bosnia and Herzegovina) Džanan Musa	(Spanish Basketball Federation) Real Madrid	(United Arab Emirates Basketball Association) Dubai	3	
July 8	(Nigeria) Jordan Nwora	(Turkish Basketball Federation) Anadolu Efes	(Basketball Federation of Serbia) Crvena zvezda		
July 9	(Serbia) Alen Smailagić	(Lithuanian Basketball Federation) Žalgiris	(Italian Basketball Federation) Virtus Bologna	2	
July 11	(United States) Carsen Edwards	(German Basketball Federation) Bayern Munich	(Italian Basketball Federation) Virtus Bologna		
July 12	(Spain) (United States) Lorenzo Brown	(Hellenic Basketball Federation) Panathinaikos	(Italian Basketball Federation) Olimpia Milano		
July 13	(United States) Collin Malcolm	(French Federation of Basketball) Paris	(Israeli Basketball Association) Hapoel Tel Aviv	2	
July 14	(France) Mouhammadou Jaiteh	(French Federation of Basketball) Monaco	(United Arab Emirates Basketball Association) Dubai	2	
July 14	(Germany) (United States) Nick Weiler-Babb	(German Basketball Federation) Bayern Munich	(Turkish Basketball Federation) Anadolu Efes	2+1	
July 15	(United States) Devin Booker	(German Basketball Federation) Bayern Munich	(Italian Basketball Federation) Olimpia Milano		
July 16	(Germany) Leon Kratzer	(French Federation of Basketball) Paris	(German Basketball Federation) Bayern Munich		
July 16	(Greece) Georgios Papagiannis	(French Federation of Basketball) Monaco	(Turkish Basketball Federation) Anadolu Efes	2+1	
July 17	(United States) Justin Anderson	(Spanish Basketball Federation) Barcelona	(United Arab Emirates Basketball Association) Dubai	1	
July 18	(Cuba) Jasiel Rivero	(Israeli Basketball Association) Maccabi Tel Aviv	(Basketball Federation of Serbia) Crvena zvezda		
July 18	(United States) (Italy) Darius Thompson	(Turkish Basketball Federation) Anadolu Efes	(Spanish Basketball Federation) Valencia	3	
July 19	(Azerbaijan) (United States) Donta Hall	(Spanish Basketball Federation) Baskonia	(Hellenic Basketball Federation) Olympiacos	3	
July 20	(Armenia) (United States) Chris Jones	(Spanish Basketball Federation) Valencia	(Israeli Basketball Association) Hapoel Tel Aviv	1	
July 21	(Georgia (country)) Tornike Shengelia	(Italian Basketball Federation) Virtus Bologna	(Spanish Basketball Federation) Barcelona	3	
July 22	(Germany) Maodo Lô	(French Federation of Basketball) Paris	(Lithuanian Basketball Federation) Žalgiris	1	
July 23	(United States) Will Clyburn	(Italian Basketball Federation) Virtus Bologna	(Spanish Basketball Federation) Barcelona	2	
July 25	(France) Isaïa Cordinier	(Italian Basketball Federation) Virtus Bologna	(Turkish Basketball Federation) Anadolu Efes	2	
July 25	(Armenia) (United States) Bryant Dunston	(Lithuanian Basketball Federation) Žalgiris	(Italian Basketball Federation) Olimpia Milano	1	
July 25	(Spain) (Montenegro) Nikola Mirotić	(Italian Basketball Federation) Olimpia Milano	(French Federation of Basketball) Monaco	2	
July 26	(Serbia) Filip Petrušev	(Basketball Federation of Serbia) Crvena zvezda	(United Arab Emirates Basketball Association) Dubai	3	
July 27	(Greece) Nikos Rogkavopoulos	(Spanish Basketball Federation) Baskonia	(Hellenic Basketball Federation) Panathinaikos	4	
July 29	(Canada) Xavier Rathan-Mayes	(Spanish Basketball Federation) Real Madrid	(German Basketball Federation) Bayern Munich		
August 6	(Georgia (country)) (United States) Kamar Baldwin	(Spanish Basketball Federation) Baskonia	(German Basketball Federation) Bayern Munich	2	
August 12	(Lithuania) Rokas Jokubaitis	(Israeli Basketball Association) Maccabi Tel Aviv	(German Basketball Federation) Bayern Munich	3	
August 25	(Canada) Isiaha Mike	(Basketball Federation of Serbia) Partizan	(German Basketball Federation) Bayern Munich	2	
September 6	(Serbia) Nemanja Nedović	(Basketball Federation of Serbia) Crvena zvezda	(French Federation of Basketball) Monaco	1	
September 10	(Serbia) Stefan Jović	(Spanish Basketball Federation) Valencia	(German Basketball Federation) Bayern Munich	1	
September 20	(Poland) (United States) Jordan Loyd	(French Federation of Basketball) Monaco	(Turkish Basketball Federation) Anadolu Efes		
September 26	(France) Frank Ntilikina	(Basketball Federation of Serbia) Partizan	(Hellenic Basketball Federation) Olympiacos	2	
September 28	(Turkey) Sertaç Şanlı	(Turkish Basketball Federation) Fenerbahçe	(United Arab Emirates Basketball Association) Dubai	1	
In-season
October 2	(Lithuania) Donatas Motiejūnas	(French Federation of Basketball) Monaco	(Basketball Federation of Serbia) Crvena zvezda	Loan	
October 20	(United States) Nate Sestina	(Spanish Basketball Federation) Valencia	(Italian Basketball Federation) Olimpia Milano		
October 26	(Angola) Bruno Fernando	(Spanish Basketball Federation) Real Madrid	(Basketball Federation of Serbia) Partizan		
October 29	(Greece) (United States) Nick Calathes	(French Federation of Basketball) Monaco	(Basketball Federation of Serbia) Partizan	1	
November 10	(Denmark) Gabriel Lundberg	(Basketball Federation of Serbia) Partizan	(Israeli Basketball Association) Maccabi Tel Aviv		
December 29	(United States) Saben Lee	(Hellenic Basketball Federation) Olympiacos	(Turkish Basketball Federation) Anadolu Efes		
January 4	(France) Nando de Colo	(French Federation of Basketball) ASVEL	(Turkish Basketball Federation) Fenerbahçe		
January 5	(Cameroon) (Italy) Paul Eboua	(Italian Basketball Federation) Olimpia Milano	(French Federation of Basketball) ASVEL	Loan	
January 5	(United States) Tyrique Jones	(Basketball Federation of Serbia) Partizan	(Hellenic Basketball Federation) Olympiacos	3	
January 15	(Brazil) Bruno Caboclo	(Israeli Basketball Association) Hapoel Tel Aviv	(United Arab Emirates Basketball Association) Dubai		
January 28	(Serbia) Aleksa Radanov	(German Basketball Federation) Bayern Munich	(Basketball Federation of Serbia) Partizan		
April 10	(Brazil) Yago dos Santos	(Basketball Federation of Serbia) Crvena zvezda	(Italian Basketball Federation) Virtus Bologna		

=== To a EuroLeague team ===
^{*}	Denotes Euroleague rookie players

Date	Player	From	To	Contract years	Ref.
Off-season
June 2	(Turkey) (Russian Basketball Federation) Sarper David Mutaf*	(Turkish Basketball Federation) Bursaspor	(Turkish Basketball Federation) Anadolu Efes	2	
June 20	(United States) Myles Cale*	(Italian Basketball Federation) Aquila Trento	(Spanish Basketball Federation) Barcelona	1	
June 23	(Greece) Vassilis Toliopoulos	(Hellenic Basketball Federation) Aris	(Hellenic Basketball Federation) Panathinaikos	3	
June 25	(France) Clément Frisch*	(French Federation of Basketball) Nancy	(Spanish Basketball Federation) Baskonia	3	
June 25	(United States) Zac Seljaas*	(German Basketball Federation) Würzburg	(French Federation of Basketball) ASVEL	1	
June 26	(Israel) Gur Lavi*	(Israeli Basketball Association) Hapoel Gilboa Galil	(Israeli Basketball Association) Maccabi Tel Aviv	3	
June 26	(Israel) Itay Segev	(Israeli Basketball Association) Ironi Ness Ziona	(Israeli Basketball Association) Hapoel Tel Aviv	3	
June 27	(United States) (Germany) Dylan Osetkowski	(Spanish Basketball Federation) Málaga	(Basketball Federation of Serbia) Partizan	1	
June 27	(United States) Dustin Sleva*	(Turkish Basketball Federation) Beşiktaş	(Lithuanian Basketball Federation) Žalgiris	1+1	
June 27	(United States) Kameron Taylor	(Spanish Basketball Federation) Málaga	(Spanish Basketball Federation) Valencia	2	
June 28	(United States) Derrick Alston Jr.*	(Spanish Basketball Federation) Manresa	(Italian Basketball Federation) Virtus Bologna		
June 29	(Nigeria) Ebuka Izundu*	(Turkish Basketball Federation) Galatasaray	(Basketball Federation of Serbia) Crvena zvezda	1+1	
June 29	(Israel) T. J. Leaf*	(Chinese Basketball Association (organisation)) Nanjing Monkey Kings	(Israeli Basketball Association) Maccabi Tel Aviv	3	
June 29	(Puerto Rico) (Nigeria) Tai Odiase*	(Turkish Basketball Federation) Bahçeşehir Koleji	(Israeli Basketball Association) Hapoel Tel Aviv	2	
June 30	(Argentina) Juani Marcos*	(Spanish Basketball Federation) Girona	(Spanish Basketball Federation) Barcelona	2	
July 1	(Central African Republic) (France) Allan Dokossi*	(French Federation of Basketball) Dijon	(French Federation of Basketball) Paris		
July 1	(Spain) Rafa Villar	(Spanish Basketball Federation) Força Lleida	(Spanish Basketball Federation) Baskonia	3	
July 2	(France) Amath M'Baye	(Russian Basketball Federation) CSKA Moscow	(French Federation of Basketball) Paris		
July 3	(France) Joël Ayayi*	(French Federation of Basketball) Bourg	(French Federation of Basketball) Paris		
July 3	(United States) Tyson Carter	(Spanish Basketball Federation) Málaga	(Basketball Federation of Serbia) Crvena zvezda		
July 3	(France) Bodian Massa*	(Spanish Basketball Federation) Manresa	(French Federation of Basketball) ASVEL	2	
July 3	(United States) Jeremy Morgan*	(Israeli Basketball Association) Hapoel Jerusalem	(French Federation of Basketball) Paris		
July 4	(United Kingdom) Quinn Ellis*	(Italian Basketball Federation) Aquila Trento	(Italian Basketball Federation) Olimpia Milano		
July 5	(Spain) (The Gambia) Yankuba Sima*	(Spanish Basketball Federation) Málaga	(Spanish Basketball Federation) Valencia	3	
July 8	(Belgium) Ismaël Bako	(Russian Basketball Federation) UNICS	(French Federation of Basketball) Paris		
July 8	(France) Bastien Vautier*	(French Federation of Basketball) Cholet	(French Federation of Basketball) ASVEL	2	
July 9	(Serbia) Aleksa Avramović	(Russian Basketball Federation) CSKA Moscow	(United Arab Emirates Basketball Association) Dubai	3	
July 9	(Canada) Tyler Ennis	(Italian Basketball Federation) Reyer Venezia	(Israeli Basketball Association) Hapoel Tel Aviv	2	
July 9	(United States) Justinian Jessup*	(German Basketball Federation) Ratiopharm Ulm	(German Basketball Federation) Bayern Munich	2	
July 9	(Greece) Ioannis Kouzeloglou*	(Hellenic Basketball Federation) AEK	(Hellenic Basketball Federation) Panathinaikos	2	
July 9	(United States) Omari Moore*	(Turkish Basketball Federation) Darüşşafaka	(Spanish Basketball Federation) Valencia	1	
July 10	(Greece) Kostas Antetokounmpo	(Spanish Basketball Federation) Murcia	(Hellenic Basketball Federation) Olympiacos	2	
July 10	(Latvia) Rodions Kurucs	(Spanish Basketball Federation) Murcia	(Spanish Basketball Federation) Baskonia	3	
July 10	(United States) McKinley Wright IV*	(Basketball Federation of Montenegro) Budućnost	(United Arab Emirates Basketball Association) Dubai	2	
July 11	(Germany) (Slovakia) David Krämer	(Spanish Basketball Federation) CB Canarias	(Spanish Basketball Federation) Real Madrid	1	
July 12	(Bosnia and Herzegovina) Kenan Kamenjaš*	(Basketball Federation of Montenegro) Budućnost	(United Arab Emirates Basketball Association) Dubai	2	
July 12	(Greece) Omiros Netzipoglou*	(Hellenic Basketball Federation) AEK	(Hellenic Basketball Federation) Olympiacos	4	
July 14	(Germany) Karim Jallow	(German Basketball Federation) Ratiopharm Ulm	(Italian Basketball Federation) Virtus Bologna		
July 15	(Canada) Oshae Brissett*	(USA Basketball) Philadelphia 76ers	(Israeli Basketball Association) Maccabi Tel Aviv	2	
July 15	(Italy) Abramo Canka	(USA Basketball) Stetson Hatters	(Italian Basketball Federation) Virtus Bologna		
July 16	(United States) Dwayne Bacon	(Russian Basketball Federation) Zenit	(United Arab Emirates Basketball Association) Dubai	1	
July 16	(Serbia) Vasilije Micić	(United States) Phoenix Suns	(Israeli Basketball Association) Hapoel Tel Aviv	3	
July 16	(Italy) (Senegal) Saliou Niang*	(Italian Basketball Federation) Aquila Trento	(Italian Basketball Federation) Virtus Bologna		
July 18	(Lithuania) Ąžuolas Tubelis*	(Lithuanian Basketball Federation) Rytas	(Lithuanian Basketball Federation) Žalgiris	2+1	
July 19	(Turkey) Şehmus Hazer	(Turkish Basketball Federation) Bahçeşehir Koleji	(Turkish Basketball Federation) Anadolu Efes	1+1	
July 19	(Canada) (Democratic Republic of the Congo) Mfiondu Kabengele*	(Italian Basketball Federation) Reyer Venezia	(United Arab Emirates Basketball Association) Dubai	2	
July 20	(Israel) Yiftach Ziv	(Israeli Basketball Association) Hapoel Holon	(Israeli Basketball Association) Hapoel Tel Aviv	3	
July 21	(Brazil) Márcio Santos*	(German Basketball Federation) Ratiopharm Ulm	(Israeli Basketball Association) Maccabi Tel Aviv	3	
July 22	(Slovenia) Vlatko Čančar*	(USA Basketball) Denver Nuggets	(Italian Basketball Federation) Olimpia Milano		
July 22	(United States) Lamar Stevens*	(USA Basketball) Memphis Grizzlies	(French Federation of Basketball) Paris	1	
July 23	(United States) Justin Robinson*	(Italian Basketball Federation) Trapani Shark	(French Federation of Basketball) Paris	2	
July 24	(United States) Shake Milton*	(USA Basketball) Los Angeles Lakers	(Basketball Federation of Serbia) Partizan	2	
July 25	(Italy) Gabriele Procida	(German Basketball Federation) Alba Berlin	(Spanish Basketball Federation) Real Madrid	3	
July 28	(Italy) Matteo Spagnolo	(German Basketball Federation) Alba Berlin	(Spanish Basketball Federation) Baskonia	3	
July 29	(France) Armel Traoré	(Spanish Basketball Federation) Manresa	(French Federation of Basketball) ASVEL	2	
July 30	(France) Brice Dessert*	(French Federation of Basketball) Strasbourg	(Turkish Basketball Federation) Anadolu Efes	4	
July 30	(United States) Chuma Okeke*	(USA Basketball) Cleveland Cavaliers	(Spanish Basketball Federation) Real Madrid	2	
August 1	(United States) Devonte' Graham*	(USA Basketball) South Bay Lakers	(Basketball Federation of Serbia) Crvena zvezda	1	
August 4	(United States) Brandon Boston Jr.*	(USA Basketball) New Orleans Pelicans	(Turkish Basketball Federation) Fenerbahçe	1	
August 4	(United States) Lonnie Walker IV	(USA Basketball) Philadelphia 76ers	(Israeli Basketball Association) Maccabi Tel Aviv	3	
August 5	(United States) Jeff Dowtin Jr.*	(USA Basketball) Philadelphia 76ers	(Israeli Basketball Association) Maccabi Tel Aviv	3	
August 7	(United States) Hamidou Diallo*	(Chinese Basketball Association (organisation)) Shanxi Loongs	(Spanish Basketball Federation) Baskonia	2	
August 7	(Serbia) Uroš Trifunović	(Turkish Basketball Federation) Tofaş	(Israeli Basketball Association) Maccabi Tel Aviv	2	
August 9	(United States) Richaun Holmes*	(USA Basketball) Washington Wizards	(Hellenic Basketball Federation) Panathinaikos	1+1	
August 10	(United States) Glynn Watson Jr.*	(French Federation of Basketball) BCM Gravelines-Dunkerque	(French Federation of Basketball) ASVEL	1	
August 11	(United States) Cole Swider*	(Canada Basketball) Toronto Raptors	(Turkish Basketball Federation) Anadolu Efes	1	
August 14	(France) Thomas Heurtel	(Spanish Basketball Federation) Coruña	(French Federation of Basketball) ASVEL	1	
August 15	(Spain) Isaac Nogués*	(USA Basketball) Rip City Remix	(Spanish Basketball Federation) Valencia	2	
August 18	(Guinea) Mamadi Diakite*	(USA Basketball) Valley Suns	(Spanish Basketball Federation) Baskonia	2	
August 22	(United States) Miles Norris*	(USA Basketball) Boston Celtics	(Spanish Basketball Federation) Barcelona	1	
August 23	(Bosnia and Herzegovina) Kosta Kondić*	(Basketball Federation of Serbia) Mega Basket	(United Arab Emirates Basketball Association) Dubai	3	
August 24	(Israel) Sandy Cohen	(Israeli Basketball Association) Hapoel Afula	(Israeli Basketball Association) Hapoel Tel Aviv	1	
August 24	(Bulgaria) Borislav Mladenov*	(Bulgarian Basketball Federation) Levski Sofia	(Israeli Basketball Association) Hapoel Tel Aviv	3	
August 27	(Spain) Izan Almansa*	(Basketball Australia) Perth Wildcats	(Spanish Basketball Federation) Real Madrid	4	
August 30	(Mali) Aliou Diarra*	(Rwanda Basketball Federation) APR	(Italian Basketball Federation) Virtus Bologna		
September 1	(Nigeria) Clifford Omoruyi*	(USA Basketball) Alabama Crimson Tide	(Israeli Basketball Association) Maccabi Tel Aviv	2	
September 3	(United States) Armando Bacot*	(USA Basketball) Memphis Hustle	(Turkish Basketball Federation) Fenerbahçe	1	
September 9	(France) David Michineau*	(Turkish Basketball Federation) Bursaspor	(French Federation of Basketball) Monaco	1	
September 10	(Canada) Trey Lyles*	(USA Basketball) Sacramento Kings	(Spanish Basketball Federation) Real Madrid	1	
September 14	(Nigeria) Ike Iroegbu*	(Spanish Basketball Federation) Girona	(Spanish Basketball Federation) Valencia	1 month	
September 15	(The Bahamas) Kai Jones*	(USA Basketball) Dallas Mavericks	(Turkish Basketball Federation) Anadolu Efes	1	
September 20	(United States) Talen Horton-Tucker*	(USA Basketball) Chicago Bulls	(Turkish Basketball Federation) Fenerbahçe	2	
September 21	(United States) Markquis Nowell*	(USA Basketball) Rio Grande Valley Vipers	(Spanish Basketball Federation) Baskonia		
September 22	(Italy) Leonardo Totè*	(Italian Basketball Federation) Napoli	(Italian Basketball Federation) Olimpia Milano		
September 23	(United States) David McCormack	(German Basketball Federation) Alba Berlin	(German Basketball Federation) Bayern Munich	1	
September 23	(Serbia) Aleksa Radanov	(Polish Basketball Federation) Legia Warsaw	(German Basketball Federation) Bayern Munich	1	
September 26	(Finland) Miikka Muurinen*	(USA Basketball) AZ Compass Prep School	(Basketball Federation of Serbia) Partizan	3	
In-season
October 6	(France) Mehdy Ngouama*	(Spanish Basketball Federation) Gran Canaria	(French Federation of Basketball) ASVEL		
October 10	(Australia) Taran Armstrong*	(USA Basketball) Santa Cruz Warriors	(United Arab Emirates Basketball Association) Dubai	1	
October 18	(United States) Kobi Simmons*	(Puerto Rican Basketball Federation) Gigantes de Carolina	(Spanish Basketball Federation) Baskonia	2 months	
October 22	(United States) Boogie Ellis*	(German Basketball Federation) Alba Berlin	(United Arab Emirates Basketball Association) Dubai	2	
October 23	(United States) Jared Butler*	(USA Basketball) Philadelphia 76ers	(Basketball Federation of Serbia) Crvena zvezda		
October 23	(United States) Spencer Dinwiddie*	(USA Basketball) Dallas Mavericks	(German Basketball Federation) Bayern Munich	1	
October 25	(United States) Braxton Key*	(USA Basketball) Golden State Warriors	(Spanish Basketball Federation) Valencia	1	
October 30	(Ukraine) Alex Len*	(USA Basketball) Los Angeles Lakers	(Spanish Basketball Federation) Real Madrid	2	
November 1	(United States) Jared Rhoden*	(Canada Basketball) Toronto Raptors	(French Federation of Basketball) Paris		
November 9	(United States) Kenneth Faried	(Taiwan) TSG GhostHawks	(Hellenic Basketball Federation) Panathinaikos	2 months	
November 13	(United States) Matt Ryan*	(USA Basketball) New York Knicks	(United Arab Emirates Basketball Association) Dubai	1	
December 3	(Lithuania) Gytis Radzevičius*	(Lithuanian Basketball Federation) Rytas Vilnius	(Spanish Basketball Federation) Baskonia	1+1	
December 10	(United States) Zach Hankins*	(Spanish Basketball Federation) Granada	(Israeli Basketball Association) Maccabi Tel Aviv	1	
December 10	(United States) Monté Morris*	(USA Basketball) Indiana Pacers	(Hellenic Basketball Federation) Olympiacos	1	
December 10	(Nigeria) (Canada) Eugene Omoruyi*	(United Arab Emirates Basketball Association) Al-Nasr	(Spanish Basketball Federation) Baskonia	2 months	
December 23	(United States) Cameron Payne*	(USA Basketball) New York Knicks	(Basketball Federation of Serbia) Partizan		
January 3	(Gabon) Chris Silva*	(Hellenic Basketball Federation) AEK Athens	(Turkish Basketball Federation) Fenerbahçe	1+1	
January 5	(North Macedonia) Nenad Dimitrijević	(Russian Basketball Federation) Zenit	(German Basketball Federation) Bayern Munich	Loan	
January 5	(Italy) Francesco Ferrari*	(Italian Basketball Federation) UEB Cividale	(Italian Basketball Federation) Virtus Bologna		
January 5	(Nigeria) Tonye Jekiri	(Russian Basketball Federation) CSKA Moscow	(Basketball Federation of Serbia) Partizan		
January 21	(Colombia) Braian Angola*	(Spanish Basketball Federation) Gran Canaria	(French Federation of Basketball) ASVEL		
January 23	(Canada) Cory Joseph*	(USA Basketball) Orlando Magic	(Hellenic Basketball Federation) Olympiacos	2	
February 12	(United States) Nigel Hayes-Davis	(USA Basketball) Phoenix Suns	(Hellenic Basketball Federation) Panathinaikos	2.5	
February 19	(United States) Kessler Edwards*	(USA Basketball) Grand Rapids Gold	(Israeli Basketball Association) Hapoel Tel Aviv		
February 23	(United States) Levi Randolph	(Russian Basketball Federation) Zenit	(Israeli Basketball Association) Hapoel Tel Aviv		
March 10	(Netherlands) Jesse Edwards*	(Basketball Australia) Melbourne United	(Spanish Basketball Federation) Baskonia		
April 15	(France) Joffrey Lauvergne	(Kuwait Basketball Association) Kuwait SC	(Basketball Federation of Serbia) Partizan		
May 15	(Spain) Álvaro Cárdenas	(Hellenic Basketball Federation) Peristeri	(Spanish Basketball Federation) Valencia	2.5	

=== Contract extensions ===
Date	Player	Team	New contract	Ref.
Off-season
May 28	(Serbia) Vladimir Lučić	(German Basketball Federation) Bayern Munich	2027	
June 2	(Turkey) Ercan Osmani	(Turkish Basketball Federation) Anadolu Efes	2027	
June 2	(Turkey) Erkan Yılmaz	(Turkish Basketball Federation) Anadolu Efes	2027	
June 3	(Lithuania) Deividas Sirvydis	(Lithuanian Basketball Federation) Žalgiris	2027+1	
June 11	(Serbia) Nikola Milutinov	(Hellenic Basketball Federation) Olympiacos	2028	
June 12	(United States) PJ Dozier	(Turkish Basketball Federation) Anadolu Efes	2027	
June 15	(United States) Jerian Grant	(Hellenic Basketball Federation) Panathinaikos	2028	
June 19	(Spain) Joel Parra	(Spanish Basketball Federation) Barcelona	2028	
June 24	(United States) Nate Mason	(United Arab Emirates Basketball Association) Dubai	2026	
June 25	(Serbia) Nemanja Dangubić	(United Arab Emirates Basketball Association) Dubai	2026	
June 26	(Slovenia) Klemen Prepelič	(United Arab Emirates Basketball Association) Dubai	2026	
June 26	(United States) Brandon Taylor	(Italian Basketball Federation) Virtus Bologna	2026	
June 27	(Italy) Awudu Abass	(United Arab Emirates Basketball Association) Dubai	2026	
June 29	(Serbia) Danilo Anđušić	(United Arab Emirates Basketball Association) Dubai	2026	
June 30	(Turkey) Metecan Birsen	(Turkish Basketball Federation) Fenerbahçe	2026	
June 30	(Germany) Isaac Bonga	(Basketball Federation of Serbia) Partizan	2027	
June 30	(Dominican Republic) Jean Montero	(Spanish Basketball Federation) Valencia	2028	
June 30	(Turkey) (United States) Scottie Wilbekin	(Turkish Basketball Federation) Fenerbahçe	2026+1	
July 1	(France) Jaylen Hoard	(Israeli Basketball Association) Maccabi Tel Aviv	2028	
July 1	(Spain) Xabier López-Arostegui	(Spanish Basketball Federation) Valencia	2027	
July 1	(United States) Matt Morgan	(Italian Basketball Federation) Virtus Bologna	2026	
July 3	(United States) Shaquielle McKissic	(Hellenic Basketball Federation) Olympiacos	2026	
July 4	(France) Rodrigue Beaubois	(Turkish Basketball Federation) Anadolu Efes	2026	
July 7	(Italy) Giampaolo Ricci	(Italian Basketball Federation) Olimpia Milano	2027	
July 8	(Chile) (Germany) Sebastián Herrera	(French Federation of Basketball) Paris	2027	
July 9	(France) (Algeria) Nadir Hifi	(French Federation of Basketball) Paris	2026	
July 10	(Turkey) (Bosnia and Herzegovina) Tarik Biberović	(Turkish Basketball Federation) Fenerbahçe	2028	
July 17	(Spain) Darío Brizuela	(Spanish Basketball Federation) Barcelona	2028	
July 18	(Italy) Diego Flaccadori	(Italian Basketball Federation) Olimpia Milano	2027	
July 19	(Turkey) Melih Mahmutoğlu	(Turkish Basketball Federation) Fenerbahçe	2026	
July 24	(Spain) Sergio Llull	(Spanish Basketball Federation) Real Madrid	2026	
July 26	(France) Evan Fournier	(Hellenic Basketball Federation) Olympiacos	2028	
August 2	(United States) Daulton Hommes	(French Federation of Basketball) Paris	2026	
August 3	(Canada) Khem Birch	(Turkish Basketball Federation) Fenerbahçe	2026	
August 4	(Israel) Bar Timor	(Israeli Basketball Association) Hapoel Tel Aviv	2028	
August 5	(Israel) Guy Palatin	(Israeli Basketball Association) Hapoel Tel Aviv	2028	
August 8	(Israel) Oz Blayzer	(Israeli Basketball Association) Hapoel Tel Aviv	2028	
August 13	(United States) Shaquille Harrison	(French Federation of Basketball) ASVEL	2026	
August 19	(Senegal) (France) Youssoupha Fall	(Spanish Basketball Federation) Barcelona	2026	
August 19	(Greece) Giannoulis Larentzakis	(Hellenic Basketball Federation) Olympiacos	2028	
In-season
October 1	(Brazil) Yago dos Santos	(Basketball Federation of Serbia) Crvena zvezda		
October 20	(France) Mouhammadou Jaiteh	(United Arab Emirates Basketball Association) Dubai	2028	
October 29	(Greece) Dinos Mitoglou	(Hellenic Basketball Federation) Panathinaikos	2029	
November 6	(Greece) Kostas Sloukas	(Hellenic Basketball Federation) Panathinaikos	2027	
December 3	(Lithuania) Donatas Motiejūnas	(Basketball Federation of Serbia) Crvena zvezda	2026	
December 23	(United States) Kobi Simmons	(Spanish Basketball Federation) Baskonia	2026	
January 27	(Israel) Will Rayman	(Israeli Basketball Association) Maccabi Tel Aviv	2029	
February 15	(The Bahamas) Kai Jones	(Turkish Basketball Federation) Anadolu Efes	2028	
February 16	(Nigeria) (Canada) Eugene Omoruyi	(Spanish Basketball Federation) Baskonia	2026	
February 27	(Spain) Jaime Pradilla	(Spanish Basketball Federation) Valencia	2028	
March 2	(Latvia) Dāvis Bertāns	(United Arab Emirates Basketball Association) Dubai		
March 2	(Serbia) Nemanja Dangubić	(United Arab Emirates Basketball Association) Dubai		
March 2	(Slovenia) Klemen Prepelič	(United Arab Emirates Basketball Association) Dubai		
March 9	(Germany) Andreas Obst	(German Basketball Federation) Bayern Munich	2029	
March 17	(Hungary) Nate Reuvers	(Spanish Basketball Federation) Valencia	2028	
March 31	(United States) Justinian Jessup	(German Basketball Federation) Bayern Munich	2028	
March 31	(United States) (North Macedonia) Omari Moore	(Spanish Basketball Federation) Valencia	2027	
April 4	(United States) Dustin Sleva	(Lithuanian Basketball Federation) Žalgiris	2027+1	
April 10	(South Sudan) Carlik Jones	(Basketball Federation of Serbia) Partizan		
April 11	(Nigeria) Ebuka Izundu	(Basketball Federation of Serbia) Crvena zvezda	2028	
April 14	(Senegal) Brancou Badio	(Spanish Basketball Federation) Valencia	2029	
April 25	(France) Jaylen Hoard	(Israeli Basketball Association) Maccabi Tel Aviv	2029	
May 10	(United States) Jimmy Clark III	(Israeli Basketball Association) Maccabi Tel Aviv	2029	
May 10	(Germany) Maodo Lô	(Lithuanian Basketball Federation) Žalgiris	2027+1	

=== Leaving a EuroLeague team ===
Date	Player	From	To	Ref.
Off-season
June 10	(United States) Brady Manek	(Lithuanian Basketball Federation) Žalgiris	(Puerto Rican Basketball Federation) Leones de Ponce	
June 27	(Uganda) (United States) Brandon Davies	(Basketball Federation of Serbia) Partizan	(Japan Basketball Association) Alvark Tokyo	
June 27	(Serbia) Balša Koprivica	(Basketball Federation of Serbia) Partizan	(Turkish Basketball Federation) Bahçeşehir Koleji	
June 28	(Italy) Giordano Bortolani	(Italian Basketball Federation) Olimpia Milano	(Italian Basketball Federation) Cantù	
June 28	(United States) Errick McCollum	(Turkish Basketball Federation) Fenerbahçe	(Turkish Basketball Federation) Galatasaray	
July 1	(Spain) Hugo González	(Spanish Basketball Federation) Real Madrid	(USA Basketball) Boston Celtics	
July 1	(Germany) Tibor Pleiß	(Hellenic Basketball Federation) Panathinaikos	(German Basketball Federation) Rasta Vechta	
July 1	(Croatia) Ante Žižić	(Italian Basketball Federation) Virtus Bologna	(Turkish Basketball Federation) Beşiktaş	
July 3	(Senegal) (Spain) Eli Ndiaye	(Spanish Basketball Federation) Real Madrid	(USA Basketball) Atlanta Hawks	
July 3	(Turkey) Doğuş Özdemiroğlu	(Turkish Basketball Federation) Anadolu Efes	(Turkish Basketball Federation) Türk Telekom	
July 5	(Latvia) Andrejs Gražulis	(Italian Basketball Federation) Virtus Bologna	(Turkish Basketball Federation) Türk Telekom	
July 7	(Turkey) Rıdvan Öncel	(Turkish Basketball Federation) Anadolu Efes	(Turkish Basketball Federation) Galatasaray	
July 12	(United States) Vitto Brown	(French Federation of Basketball) Monaco	(Turkish Basketball Federation) Beşiktaş	
July 12	(Estonia) Sander Raieste	(Spanish Basketball Federation) Baskonia	(Spanish Basketball Federation) Murcia	
July 14	(United States) Matt Mitchell	(Lithuanian Basketball Federation) Žalgiris	(Turkish Basketball Federation) Bahçeşehir Koleji	
July 15	(Italy) Guglielmo Caruso	(Italian Basketball Federation) Olimpia Milano	(Italian Basketball Federation) Napoli	
July 17	(United States) Trevion Williams	(Israeli Basketball Association) Maccabi Tel Aviv	(Turkish Basketball Federation) Bahçeşehir Koleji	
July 23	(United States) Mike Daum	(Basketball Federation of Serbia) Crvena zvezda	(Japan Basketball Association) Shinshu Brave Warriors	
July 23	(North Macedonia) Nenad Dimitrijević	(Italian Basketball Federation) Olimpia Milano	(Russian Basketball Federation) Zenit	
July 24	(Lithuania) Rokas Giedraitis	(Basketball Federation of Serbia) Crvena zvezda	(Spanish Basketball Federation) Canarias	
July 24	(United States) Levi Randolph	(Israeli Basketball Association) Maccabi Tel Aviv	(Russian Basketball Federation) Zenit	
July 25	(United States) Nigel Hayes-Davis	(Turkish Basketball Federation) Fenerbahçe	(USA Basketball) Phoenix Suns	
July 29	(France) Fabien Causeur	(Italian Basketball Federation) Olimpia Milano		
July 30	(France) Petr Cornelie	(French Federation of Basketball) Monaco	(Turkish Basketball Federation) Esenler Erokspor	
July 31	(United States) André Roberson	(French Federation of Basketball) ASVEL	(Russian Basketball Federation) Zenit	
August 2	(United States) Isaiah Wong	(Lithuanian Basketball Federation) Žalgiris	(Spanish Basketball Federation) Gran Canaria	
August 18	(United States) John Brown	(Basketball Federation of Serbia) Crvena zvezda	(Basketball Australia) South East Melbourne Phoenix	
August 21	(Canada) Dyshawn Pierre	(Turkish Basketball Federation) Fenerbahçe	(Russian Basketball Federation) UNICS	
August 24	(Serbia) Branko Lazić	(Basketball Federation of Serbia) Crvena zvezda		
August 24	(Serbia) Luka Mitrović	(Basketball Federation of Serbia) Crvena zvezda	(Russian Basketball Federation) CSKA Moscow	
September 1	(Lithuania) Lukas Lekavičius	(Lithuanian Basketball Federation) Žalgiris	(Hellenic Basketball Federation) AEK	
September 9	(Canada) (Greece) Naz Mitrou-Long	(Hellenic Basketball Federation) Olympiacos	(Italian Basketball Federation) Napoli	
September 18	(Bulgaria) Borislav Mladenov	(Israeli Basketball Association) Hapoel Tel Aviv	(Basketball Austria) Vienna	
September 22	(United States) Freddie Gillespie	(Italian Basketball Federation) Olimpia Milano	(Turkish Basketball Federation) Galatasaray	
In-season
October 16	(Nigeria) Ike Iroegbu	(Spanish Basketball Federation) Valencia	(Italian Basketball Federation) Varese	
October 22	(Slovenia) Vlatko Čančar	(Italian Basketball Federation) Olimpia Milano		
October 22	(Croatia) Luka Šamanić	(Spanish Basketball Federation) Baskonia	(Russian Basketball Federation) Zenit	
November 8	(Serbia) Uroš Trifunović	(Israeli Basketball Association) Maccabi Tel Aviv	(Turkish Basketball Federation) Türk Telekom	
December 1	(United States) (North Macedonia) Ethan Happ	(Spanish Basketball Federation) Valencia	(Spanish Basketball Federation) San Pablo Burgos	
December 3	(United States) Hamidou Diallo	(Spanish Basketball Federation) Baskonia	(Chinese Basketball Association (organisation)) Shanxi Loongs	
December 12	(France) Mehdy Ngouama	(French Federation of Basketball) ASVEL	(Spain) Granada	
January 1	(Greece) Ioannis Kouzeloglou	(Hellenic Basketball Federation) Panathinaikos	(Hellenic Basketball Federation) Maroussi	
January 4	(United States) Spencer Dinwiddie	(German Basketball Federation) Bayern Munich		
January 9	(Greece) Kostas Antetokounmpo	(Hellenic Basketball Federation) Olympiacos	(Hellenic Basketball Federation) Aris	
January 13	(Turkey) Sertaç Şanlı	(United Arab Emirates Basketball Association) Dubai	(Turkey) Beşiktaş	
January 13	(United States) Brandon Taylor	(Italian Basketball Federation) Virtus Bologna	(Greece) Panionios	
January 23	(Belgium) Ismaël Bako	(French Federation of Basketball) Paris	(Russia) Zenit	
January 26	(Italy) Leonardo Totè	(Italian Basketball Federation) Olimpia Milano	(Italian Basketball Federation) Napoli	
January 31	(United States) Devonte' Graham	(Basketball Federation of Serbia) Crvena zvezda		
February 9	(Italy) Abramo Canka	(Italian Basketball Federation) Virtus Bologna	(Italian Basketball Federation) Roseto	
February 16	(United States) Cameron Payne	(Basketball Federation of Serbia) Partizan	(USA Basketball) Philadelphia 76ers	
February 26	(United States) Jabari Parker	(Basketball Federation of Serbia) Partizan	(Spanish Basketball Federation) Joventut	
February 28	(Turkey) Ömer Yurtseven	(Hellenic Basketball Federation) Panathinaikos	(USA Basketball) Rio Grande Valley Vipers	
March 5	(France) Yoan Makoundou	(French Federation of Basketball) Monaco	(Chinese Basketball Association (organisation)) Fujian Sturgeons	
March 7	(France) David Michineau	(French Federation of Basketball) Monaco	(Basketball Association of Tanzania) Dar City BC	
March 25	(United States) Richaun Holmes	(Hellenic Basketball Federation) Panathinaikos		
March 30	(United States) (Turkey) Scottie Wilbekin	(Turkish Basketball Federation) Fenerbahçe		
May 20	(Australia) Taran Armstrong	(United Arab Emirates Basketball Association) Dubai	(Basketball Australia) Tasmania JackJumpers	

== See also ==
- List of 2025–26 NBA season transactions
