= 2025–26 EuroLeague =

69th season of the European premier basketball league

- Season: 2025–26
- Dates: 30 September 2025 – 24 May 2026
- Teams: 20

Regular season
- Top seed: (Greece) Olympiacos
- Season MVP: (Bulgaria) Sasha Vezenkov

Final Four
- Champions: (Greece) Olympiacos (4th title)
- Runners-up: (Spain) Real Madrid
- Semi-finalists: (Spanish Basketball Federation) Valencia Basket (Turkish Basketball Federation) Fenerbahçe Beko
- Final Four MVP: (France) Evan Fournier

Awards
- Playoffs MVP: (Dominican Republic) Jean Montero
- Alphonso Ford Trophy: (Bulgaria) Sasha Vezenkov
- Best Defender: (Guinea) Alpha Diallo
- Rising Star: (Dominican Republic) Jean Montero
- Coach of the Year: (Spain) Pedro Martínez
- Play-in MVP: (North Macedonia) T. J. Shorts

Statistical leaders
Points	(Bulgaria) Sasha Vezenkov	19.0
Rebounds	(Serbia) Nikola Milutinov	7.2
Assists	(Bulgaria) Codi Miller-McIntyre	7.4
Index Rating	(Bulgaria) Sasha Vezenkov	22.1

Records
- Biggest home win: Žalgiris 109–68 Partizan (19 December 2025)
- Biggest away win: Partizan 66–104 Olympiacos (14 January 2026)
- Highest scoring: Barcelona 134–124 Saski Baskonia (19 December 2025)
- Lowest scoring: Bayern Munich 64–53 Milan (14 October 2025)
- Winning streak: 9 games Fenerbahçe
- Losing streak: 9 games Bayern Munich; Anadolu Efes
- Highest attendance: 21,854; Partizan 79–76 Crvena zvezda (12 December 2025)
- Lowest attendance: 80; Maccabi Tel Aviv 103–89 Anadolu Efes (2 April 2026)
- Attendance: 3,304,169
- Average attendance: 9,468 per match

The 2025–26 EuroLeague was the 26th season of the modern era of the EuroLeague. Including the competition's previous incarnation as the FIBA Europe Champions Cup, it was the 69th season of the premier basketball competition for European men's clubs. This was also the first season in the league without the sponsorship of Turkish Airlines since 2009–10 season. The Final Four was held at Telekom Center Athens in Athens, Greece, which marked the second time the Greek capital hosted the Final Four, the first being in 2007.

Starting from this season, the league was expanded from 18 to 20 teams, allowing Dubai Basketball to enter the competition, becoming the first non-Israeli team from outside of Europe to play in the league.

Fenerbahçe Beko were the defending champions, but they failed to retain the title after being eliminated by eventual winners Olympiacos in the semi-finals.

Olympiacos secured their first title in 13 years and 4th overall in the Final Four, which was held at their arch rivals Panathinaikos AKTOR's venue, Telekom Center Athens. Olympiacos also became the first ever regular season leader to claim the title.

== Teams ==
=== Team changes (pre-season) ===
A total of 20 teams participated in the league, including 17 teams from the 2024–25 season, two promoted from the 2024–25 EuroCup and one receiving a long-term wild card.

On 11 April 2025, Hapoel IBI Tel Aviv won the EuroCup title by sweeping Dreamland Gran Canaria, and earned the spot in the EuroLeague. It was the debut season of the team in the European top flight. On May 7, 2025, ALBA Berlin opted to play in the FIBA-organised Basketball Champions League, after competing for 24 years in Euroleague Basketball competitions. On June 19, 2025, the allocation of long-term wild cards to the following clubs was approved with the aim of ensuring the EuroLeague's long-term sustainability and supporting its strategic expansion to 20 teams:

- Three-year wild card until the 2027–28 season: Crvena zvezda Meridianbet, Partizan Mozzart Bet, Valencia Basket and Virtus Bologna.
- Five-year wild card until the 2029–30 season: Dubai Basketball.

▲ Promoted from EuroCup	▲ Applied for participation	▼ Withdrawn from participation
Hapoel IBI Tel Aviv; Valencia Basket (Note: Valencia Basket earned a three-year wild card until the 2027–28 season.)	Dubai Basketball (Note: Dubai Basketball earned a five-year wild card until the 2029–30 season.)	ALBA Berlin (Note: ALBA Berlin opted to participate in the Basketball Champions League (BCL) organized under the umbrella of the International Basketball Federation (FIBA) after 24 years of competing in Euroleague Basketball competitions.)

=== Qualified teams ===
The labels in the parentheses show how each team qualified for the place of its starting round:

Qualified teams for 2025–26 EuroLeague Licensed clubs
(Spain) Barcelona	(Greece) Olympiacos	(Turkey) Fenerbahçe	(Israel) Maccabi Tel Aviv
(Spain) Baskonia	(Greece) Panathinaikos	(France) ASVEL	(Italy) Olimpia Milano
(Spain) Real Madrid	(Turkey) Anadolu Efes	(Germany) Bayern Munich	(Lithuania) Žalgiris

Associated clubs
(Spain) Valencia Basket (3-year WC)	(Serbia) Crvena zvezda (3-year WC)	(France) AS Monaco (1-year WC)	(Israel) Hapoel IBI Tel Aviv (EC)
(United Arab Emirates) Dubai Basketball (5-year WC)	(Serbia) Partizan (3-year WC)	(France) Paris Basketball (1-year WC)	(Italy) Virtus Bologna (3-year WC)

Notes

1. France (FRA): AS Monaco is a club based in Monaco (which does not qualify for European competitions), but participate in European competitions through one of the berths for France (any coefficient points it earns count toward France)

=== Venues and locations ===
Location of teams in 2025–26 EuroLeague
Location of teams from the Middle East in 2025–26 EuroLeague

Team	Home city	Arena	Capacity	Last season
(Turkish Basketball Federation) Anadolu Efes	Istanbul	Turkcell Basketball Development Center	10,000	6th
(French Federation of Basketball) AS Monaco	Monaco	Salle Gaston Médecin	5,000	2nd place, silver medalist(s)
(Spanish Basketball Federation) Barcelona	Barcelona	Palau Blaugrana	7,585	5th
(German Basketball Federation) Bayern Munich	Munich	SAP Garden	11,500	9th
(Basketball Federation of Serbia) Crvena zvezda Meridianbet	Belgrade	Belgrade Arena	21,000	10th
(United Arab Emirates Basketball Association) Dubai Basketball	Dubai	Coca-Cola Arena	13,221	—
(United Arab Emirates Basketball Association) Dubai Basketball	Dubai	(Basketball Federation of Bosnia and Herzegovina) Juan Antonio Samaranch Olympic Hall	12,000	—
(United Arab Emirates Basketball Association) Dubai Basketball	Dubai	(Basketball Federation of Bosnia and Herzegovina) Arena Zenica	6,200	—
(Italian Basketball Federation) EA7 Emporio Armani Milan	Milan	Unipol Forum	11,200	11th
(Italian Basketball Federation) EA7 Emporio Armani Milan	Milan	Allianz Cloud Arena	5,420	11th
(Turkish Basketball Federation) Fenerbahçe Beko	Istanbul	Ülker Sports and Event Hall	13,000	1st place, gold medalist(s)
(Israeli Basketball Association) Hapoel IBI Tel Aviv	Tel Aviv			
(Israeli Basketball Association) Hapoel IBI Tel Aviv	Tel Aviv	Menora Mivtachim Arena	10,383	▲ (gold) (EuroCup)
(Israeli Basketball Association) Hapoel IBI Tel Aviv	Tel Aviv	(Bulgarian Basketball Federation) Arena 8888 Sofia	12,373	▲ (gold) (EuroCup)
(Israeli Basketball Association) Hapoel IBI Tel Aviv	Tel Aviv	(Bulgarian Basketball Federation) Arena Botevgrad	4,500	▲ (gold) (EuroCup)
(Spanish Basketball Federation) Kosner Baskonia Vitoria-Gasteiz	Vitoria-Gasteiz	Buesa Arena	15,431	14th
(French Federation of Basketball) LDLC ASVEL	Villeurbanne	LDLC Arena	12,523	15th
(French Federation of Basketball) LDLC ASVEL	Villeurbanne	Astroballe	5,556	15th
(Israeli Basketball Association) Maccabi Rapyd Tel Aviv	Tel Aviv	Menora Mivtachim Arena	10,383	16th
(Israeli Basketball Association) Maccabi Rapyd Tel Aviv	Tel Aviv	(Basketball Federation of Serbia) Aleksandar Nikolić Hall	8,000	16th
(Hellenic Basketball Federation) Olympiacos	Piraeus	Peace and Friendship Stadium	12,930	3rd place, bronze medalist(s)
(Hellenic Basketball Federation) Panathinaikos AKTOR	Athens	Telekom Center Athens	19,250	4th
(French Federation of Basketball) Paris Basketball	Paris	Adidas Arena	8,000	8th
(French Federation of Basketball) Paris Basketball	Paris	Accor Arena	15,705	8th
(Basketball Federation of Serbia) Partizan Mozzart Bet	Belgrade	Belgrade Arena	21,000	12th
(Spanish Basketball Federation) Real Madrid	Madrid	Movistar Arena	15,000	7th
(Spanish Basketball Federation) Valencia Basket	Valencia	Roig Arena	15,600	▲ (bronze) (EuroCup)
(Italian Basketball Federation) Virtus Bologna	Bologna	Virtus Arena	10,500	17th
(Italian Basketball Federation) Virtus Bologna	Bologna	PalaDozza	5,570	17th
(Lithuanian Basketball Federation) Žalgiris	Kaunas	Žalgirio Arena	15,415	13th

=== Managerial changes ===
Team	Outgoing manager	Manner of departure	Date of vacancy	Position in table	Replaced with	Date of appointment
(French Federation of Basketball) Paris Basketball	(Brazilian Basketball Confederation) Tiago Splitter	Signed by Portland Trail Blazers	11 June 2025	Pre-season	(Italian Basketball Federation) Francesco Tabellini	30 June 2025
(Turkish Basketball Federation) Anadolu Efes	(Italy) Luca Banchi	Mutual agreement	15 June 2025	Pre-season	(Basketball Federation of Serbia) Igor Kokoškov	2 July 2025
(Lithuanian Basketball Federation) Žalgiris	(Italian Basketball Federation) Andrea Trinchieri	Mutual agreement	23 June 2025	Pre-season	(Lithuanian Basketball Federation) Tomas Masiulis	28 June 2025
Real Madrid	Chus Mateo	Mutual agreement	3 July 2025	Pre-season	Sergio Scariolo	3 July 2025
Baskonia	Pablo Laso	Mutual agreement	8 August 2025	Pre-season	Paolo Galbiati	8 August 2025
(Basketball Federation of Serbia) Crvena zvezda	(Hellenic Basketball Federation) Ioannis Sfairopoulos	Mutual agreement	9 October 2025	20th (0–2)	(Basketball Federation of Serbia) Saša Obradović	11 October 2025
(Spanish Basketball Federation) Barcelona	(Spanish Basketball Federation) Joan Peñarroya	Fired	9 November 2025	9th (5–4)	(Spanish Basketball Federation) Xavi Pascual	13 November 2025
(Italian Basketball Federation) Olimpia Milano	(Italian Basketball Federation) Ettore Messina	Resigned	24 November 2025	11th (6–6)	(Italian Basketball Federation) Giuseppe Poeta	24 November 2025
(Basketball Federation of Serbia) Partizan	(Basketball Federation of Serbia) Željko Obradović	Resigned	26 November 2025	18th (4–9)	(Spanish Basketball Federation) Joan Peñarroya	23 December 2025
(Turkish Basketball Federation) Anadolu Efes	(Basketball Federation of Serbia) Igor Kokoškov	Fired	27 November 2025	15th (5–8)	(Spanish Basketball Federation) Pablo Laso	13 December 2025
(German Basketball Federation) Bayern Munich	(Canada Basketball) Gordon Herbert	Fired	20 December 2025	19th (5–12)	(Basketball Federation of Serbia) Svetislav Pešić	22 December 2025
(French Federation of Basketball) Monaco	(Hellenic Basketball Federation) Vassilis Spanoulis	Resigned	11 March 2026	9th (16–14)	(Georgian Basketball Federation) Manuchar Markoishvili	12 March 2026
(French Federation of Basketball) Paris Basketball	(Italian Basketball Federation) Francesco Tabellini	Fired	23 March 2026	17th (12–21)	(German Basketball Federation) Julius Thomas	23 March 2026
(Italian Basketball Federation) Virtus Bologna	(Basketball Federation of Montenegro) Duško Ivanović	Fired	27 March 2026	15th (13–20)	(Basketball Federation of Serbia) Nenad Jakovljević	27 March 2026
(United Arab Emirates Basketball Association) Dubai Basketball	(Basketball Federation of Slovenia) Jurica Golemac	Fired	12 April 2026	11th (19–18)	(Basketball Federation of Slovenia) Aleksander Sekulić	13 April 2026

=== Referees ===
A total of 70 Euroleague Basketball officials were set to work on the 2025–26 season in EuroLeague and EuroCup:

- (Albanian Basketball Association) Gentian Cici
- (Argentine Basketball Confederation) Leandro Lezcano
- (Basketball Belgium) Nick van den Broeck
- (Basketball Federation of Bosnia and Herzegovina) Dragan Porobić
- (Croatian Basketball Federation) Denis Hadžić
- (Croatian Basketball Federation) Franko Gracin
- (Croatian Basketball Federation) Josip Radojković
- (Croatian Basketball Federation) Luka Kardum
- (Croatian Basketball Federation) Sreten Radović
- (Croatian Basketball Federation) Tomislav Hordov
- (Czech Basketball Federation) Robert Vyklický
- (Estonian Basketball Association) Rain Peerandi
- (French Federation of Basketball) Hugues Thépénier
- (French Federation of Basketball) Joseph Bissang
- (French Federation of Basketball) Maxime Boubert
- (French Federation of Basketball) Mehdi Difallah
- (French Federation of Basketball) Thomas Bissuel
- (German Basketball Federation) Anne Panther
- (German Basketball Federation) Christian Theis
- (German Basketball Federation) Robert Lottermoser
- (German Basketball Federation) Steve Bittner
- (British Basketball) Eduard Udyanskyy
- (Hellenic Basketball Federation) Ioannis Foufis
- (Hellenic Basketball Federation) Ioannis Tiganis
- (Hellenic Basketball Federation) Vassilis Pitsilkas
- (Hellenic Basketball Federation) Vasiliki Tsaroucha
- (Israeli Basketball Association) Adar Peer
- (Israeli Basketball Association) Amit Balak
- (Israeli Basketball Association) Noam Gordon
- (Israeli Basketball Association) Seffi Shemmesh
- (Italian Basketball Federation) Guido Giovannetti
- (Italian Basketball Federation) Manuel Attard
- (Italian Basketball Federation) Michele Rossi
- (Latvian Basketball Association) Kristaps Konstantinovs
- (Latvian Basketball Association) Oļegs Latiševs
- (Lithuanian Basketball Federation) Artūras Šukys
- (Lithuanian Basketball Federation) Gytis Vilius
- (Basketball Federation of Montenegro) Igor Dragojević
- (Basketball Federation of Montenegro) Miloš Koljenšić
- (Polish Basketball Federation) Jakub Zamojski
- (Polish Basketball Federation) Marcin Kowalski
- (Polish Basketball Federation) Piotr Pastusiak
- (Polish Basketball Federation) Tomasz Trawicki
- (Portuguese Basketball Federation) Sérgio Silva
- (Basketball Federation of Serbia) Ilija Belošević
- (Basketball Federation of Serbia) Marko Juras
- (Basketball Federation of Serbia) Milivoje Jovčić
- (Basketball Federation of Serbia) Stefan Ćalić
- (Basketball Federation of Serbia) Uroš Nikolić
- (Basketball Federation of Serbia) Uroš Obrknežević
- (Basketball Federation of Slovenia) Damir Javor
- (Basketball Federation of Slovenia) Mario Majkić
- (Basketball Federation of Slovenia) Milan Nedović
- (Basketball Federation of Slovenia) Saša Pukl
- (Basketball Federation of Slovenia) Sašo Petek
- (Spanish Basketball Federation) Alberto Baena
- (Spanish Basketball Federation) Arnau Padrós
- (Spanish Basketball Federation) Carlos Cortés
- (Spanish Basketball Federation) Carlos Peruga
- (Spanish Basketball Federation) Emilio Pérez
- (Spanish Basketball Federation) Jordi Aliaga
- (Spanish Basketball Federation) Juan Carlos García
- (Spanish Basketball Federation) Miguel Ángel Pérez
- (Spanish Basketball Federation) Sergio Manuel
- (Swedish Basketball Federation) Saulius Račys
- (Turkish Basketball Federation) Can Mavisu
- (Turkish Basketball Federation) Emin Moğulkoç
- (Turkish Basketball Federation) Hüseyin Çelik
- (Turkish Basketball Federation) Kerem Baki
- (Basketball Federation of Ukraine) Borys Ryzhyk

== Regular season ==
The regular season began on 30 September 2025 and concluded on 17 April 2026. The 20 teams played against each other home-and-away in a round-robin format over 38 rounds, where only 10 teams advanced to the postseason. Moreover, the top six teams from regular season have received a bye to the playoffs, while the teams placed from 7th to 10th will participate in the play-in to get the last two playoff spots. At the tail end of the standings, teams placed from 11th to 20th were eliminated after the regular season.

=== League table ===
Pos	Team	Pld	W	L	PF	PA	PD	Qualification
1	(Hellenic Basketball Federation) Olympiacos	38	26	12	3406	3144	+262	Qualification to playoffs
2	(Spanish Basketball Federation) Valencia Basket	38	25	13	3418	3243	+175	Qualification to playoffs
3	(Spanish Basketball Federation) Real Madrid	38	24	14	3342	3156	+186	Qualification to playoffs
4	(Turkish Basketball Federation) Fenerbahçe Beko	38	24	14	3114	3061	+53	Qualification to playoffs
5	(Lithuanian Basketball Federation) Žalgiris	38	23	15	3304	3125	+179	Qualification to playoffs
6	(Israeli Basketball Association) Hapoel IBI Tel Aviv	38	23	15	3329	3211	+118	Qualification to playoffs
7	(Hellenic Basketball Federation) Panathinaikos AKTOR	38	22	16	3314	3228	+86	Qualification to play-in
8	(French Federation of Basketball) Monaco	38	22	16	3417	3282	+135	Qualification to play-in
9	(Spanish Basketball Federation) Barcelona	38	21	17	3167	3147	+20	Qualification to play-in
10	(Basketball Federation of Serbia) Crvena zvezda Meridianbet	38	21	17	3287	3245	+42	Qualification to play-in
11	(United Arab Emirates Basketball Association) Dubai Basketball	38	19	19	3324	3325	−1	
12	(Israeli Basketball Association) Maccabi Rapyd Tel Aviv	38	18	20	3386	3486	−100	
13	(German Basketball Federation) Bayern Munich	38	17	21	3063	3168	−105	
14	(Italian Basketball Federation) EA7 Emporio Armani Milan	38	17	21	3246	3294	−48	
15	(Basketball Federation of Serbia) Partizan Mozzart Bet	38	16	22	3052	3242	−190	
16	(French Federation of Basketball) Paris Basketball	38	15	23	3422	3456	−34	
17	(Italian Basketball Federation) Virtus Bologna	38	14	24	3110	3285	−175	
18	(Spanish Basketball Federation) Kosner Baskonia	38	13	25	3321	3483	−162	
19	(Turkish Basketball Federation) Anadolu Efes	38	12	26	2991	3151	−160	
20	(French Federation of Basketball) LDLC ASVEL	38	8	30	2989	3270	−281	

Source: EuroLeague
Rules for classification: Regular season tiebreakers

=== Results ===
Home \ Away	EFS	FCB	BKN	BAY	CZV	DUB	MIL	FBB	HTA	ASV	MTA	ASM	OLY	PAO	PBB	PAR	RMB	VBC	VIR	ZAL
Anadolu Efes (Turkish Basketball Federation)	—	74–73	75–89	74–72	65–87	76–80	93–97	69–79	81–87	88–91	85–78	93–98	68–74	81–95	79–84	79–72	75–81	107–90	91–60	92–82
Barcelona (Spanish Basketball Federation)	78–71	—	134–124	95–69	92–88	91–89	74–72	78–82	75–80	88–78	93–83	74–90	98–85	79–93	74–85	88–70	92–101	108–102	88–81	73–88
Baskonia (Spanish Basketball Federation)	86–75	91–97	—	95–73	100–108	92–85	88–78	93–108	118–109	78–73	101–98	85–73	96–102	84–86	81–97	79–91	98–96	79–108	87–76	102–91
Bayern Munich (German Basketball Federation)	80–81	74–75	96–89	—	97–88	74–87	64–53	85–76	72–82	93–83	95–71	91–82	71–96	85–78	81–75	63–67	90–84	93–89	86–70	70–98
Crvena zvezda Meridianbet (Basketball Federation of Serbia)	91–81	79–89	90–72	80–85	—	95–92	82–92	79–73	87–75	79–65	82–83	91–79	91–80	86–68	94–81	82–89	90–75	89–106	90–89	88–79
Dubai Basketball (United Arab Emirates Basketball Association)	69–85	83–78	100–94	89–88	102–86	—	99–92	92–81	97–109	96–85	95–97	101–91	108–98	104–107	90–89	89–76	93–85	85–95	72–80	95–89
EA7 Emporio Armani Milan (Italian Basketball Federation)	87–74	87–84	109–89	84–94	96–104	78–96	—	72–87	83–105	80–72	96–87	79–82	88–87	96–89	86–77	85–79	89–82	100–103	103–87	82–86
Fenerbahçe Beko (Turkish Basketball Federation)	79–62	72–71	84–71	88–73	81–86	69–93	79–75	—	74–68	81–67	84–75	88–70	88–80	77–81	96–77	81–78	69–74	82–79	66–64	82–92
Hapoel IBI Tel Aviv (Israeli Basketball Association)	71–66	103–87	114–89	64–79	84–78	85–60	92–86	95–80	—	87–80	90–103	85–77	85–89	92–88	93–82	97–84	74–75	99–104	109–91	80–93
LDLC ASVEL (French Federation of Basketball)	103–99	91–98	102–95	76–74	93–106	85–79	76–77	76–81	73–81	—	85–89	52–84	74–82	78–79	94–89	88–87	69–80	77–80	83–90	77–96
Maccabi Rapyd Tel Aviv (Israeli Basketball Association)	103–89	71–92	89–83	111–106	92–99	104–100	88–102	94–89	88–99	92–84	—	107–112	94–95	75–71	94–101	95–93	92–91	85–82	85–89	100–97
Monaco (French Federation of Basketball)	102–66	93–86	102–92	103–77	96–100	103–81	90–85	86–92	105–85	81–76	86–91	—	81–80	92–84	125–104	101–84	100–95	90–84	82–84	84–89
Olympiacos (Hellenic Basketball Federation)	78–82	87–75	90–80	95–80	92–86	86–67	85–76	104–87	62–58	107–84	100–93	87–92	—	86–80	98–86	80–71	102–88	92–99	109–77	95–78
Panathinaikos AKTOR (Hellenic Basketball Federation)	97–62	96–103	93–74	87–79	82–74	103–82	74–87	83–85	93–82	91–85	99–85	107–97	82–87	—	99–104	91–69	82–81	79–89	84–71	92–88
Paris Basketball (French Federation of Basketball)	80–90	69–85	105–87	82–86	102–92	79–99	103–93	90–92	88–89	90–81	113–80	87–95	87–104	95–101	—	81–90	98–92	90–86	90–79	105–108
Partizan Mozzart Bet (Basketball Federation of Serbia)	93–87	76–78	91–79	92–85	79–76	88–74	80–78	87–99	104–101	79–78	87–112	78–76	66–104	78–62	83–101	—	73–77	110–104	68–86	74–83
Real Madrid (Spanish Basketball Federation)	82–71	80–61	94–87	93–70	103–82	107–93	106–77	84–58	92–83	85–72	98–86	90–78	89–77	77–87	95–90	93–86	—	96–79	92–84	100–99
Valencia Basket (Spanish Basketball Federation)	94–82	62–66	91–81	90–64	76–73	80–78	102–96	94–79	93–100	82–67	94–83	92–101	85–84	102–84	98–84	86–73	89–76	—	103–94	91–87
Virtus Bologna (Italian Basketball Federation)	99–89	85–80	72–82	80–85	93–102	79–78	97–85	80–85	74–79	70–80	99–89	77–73	94–97	92–75	82–103	82–88	74–68	81–94	—	83–79
Žalgiris (Lithuanian Basketball Federation)	64–87	83–71	82–67	78–71	99–67	65–77	78–89	84–81	93–82	96–59	65–83	104–87	99–94	85–92	85–92	85–79	87–85	86–77	84–65	—

Source: EuroLeague
Legend: Blue = home team win; Red = away team win.
Matches with lighter background shading were decided after overtime.

== Play-in ==
Under the format introduced in 2024, the 7th to 10th-ranked teams faced each other in the play-in. Each game is hosted by the team with the higher regular season record. The format was similar to the first two rounds of the Page–McIntyre system for a four-team playoff that was identical to that of the NBA play-in tournament. First, the 7th seed will host the 8th seed, with the winner advancing to the playoffs as the 7th seed; likewise the 9th seed will host the 10th seed, with the loser eliminated. Then the loser of the 7-v-8 game will host the winner of the 9-v-10 game, with the winner of that game getting the final playoff spot, as the 8th seed.

Round 1
Play-In A
7	(Hellenic Basketball Federation) Panathinaikos AKTOR	87
8	(French Federation of Basketball) Monaco	79
Play-In B
9	(Spanish Basketball Federation) Barcelona	80
10	(Basketball Federation of Serbia) Crvena zvezda Meridianbet	72

Round 2
Play-In C
8	(French Federation of Basketball) Monaco	79
9	(Spanish Basketball Federation) Barcelona	70

== Playoffs ==
Playoffs series are best-of-five. The first team to win three games wins the series. A 2–2–1 format is used – teams with home-court advantage play games 1, 2, and 5 at home, while their opponents host games 3 and 4. Games 4 and 5 are only played if necessary. The four winning teams advance to the Final Four.

=== Series ===
Team 1	Series	Team 2	Game 1	Game 2	Game 3	Game 4	Game 5
Olympiacos (Hellenic Basketball Federation)	3–0	(French Federation of Basketball) Monaco	91–70	94–64	105–82	—	—
Valencia Basket (Spanish Basketball Federation)	3–2	(Hellenic Basketball Federation) Panathinaikos AKTOR	67–68	105–107 (OT)	91–87	89–86	81–64
Real Madrid (Spanish Basketball Federation)	3–1	(Israeli Basketball Association) Hapoel IBI Tel Aviv	86–82	102–75	69–76	87–81	—
Fenerbahçe Beko (Turkish Basketball Federation)	3–1	(Lithuanian Basketball Federation) Žalgiris	89–78	86–74	78–81	94–90 (OT)	—

== Final Four ==
The Final Four went on to be hosted by the Telekom Center in Athens, Greece, as announced by EuroLeague Basketball on 10 September 2025.

Semifinals; 22 May
(Hellenic Basketball Federation) Olympiacos	79
(Turkish Basketball Federation) Fenerbahçe Beko	61
(Spanish Basketball Federation) Valencia Basket	90
(Spanish Basketball Federation) Real Madrid	105

Championship game 24 May
(Hellenic Basketball Federation) Olympiacos	92
(Spanish Basketball Federation) Real Madrid	85

== Awards ==
All official awards of the 2025–26 EuroLeague.

=== EuroLeague MVP ===
- (Bulgaria) Sasha Vezenkov ( (Greece) Olympiacos)

=== EuroLeague Final Four MVP ===
- (France) Evan Fournier ( (Greece) Olympiacos)

=== All-EuroLeague Teams ===
Pos.	First Team		Second Team	
G	(France) Sylvain Francisco	(Lithuania) Žalgiris	(United States) Wade Baldwin	(Turkey) Fenerbahçe Beko
G	(Dominican Republic) Jean Montero	(Spain) Valencia Basket	(Greece) Tyler Dorsey	(Greece) Olympiacos
F	(United States) Elijah Bryant	(Israel) Hapoel IBI Tel Aviv	(United States) Kendrick Nunn	(Greece) Panathinaikos AKTOR
F	(Bulgaria) Sasha Vezenkov	(Greece) Olympiacos	(United States) Talen Horton-Tucker	(Turkey) Fenerbahçe Beko
C	(Serbia) Nikola Milutinov	(Greece) Olympiacos	(Cape Verde) Edy Tavares	(Spain) Real Madrid

=== EuroLeague Playoffs MVP ===
- (Dominican Republic) Jean Montero ( (Spain) Valencia Basket)

=== Alphonso Ford Top Scorer Trophy ===
- (Bulgaria) Sasha Vezenkov ( (Greece) Olympiacos)

=== Best Defender ===
- (Guinea) Alpha Diallo ( (France) Monaco)

=== Rising Star ===
- (Dominican Republic) Jean Montero ( (Spain) Valencia Basket)

=== Coach of the Year ===
- (Spain) Pedro Martínez ( (Spain) Valencia Basket)

=== Play-in MVP ===
- (North Macedonia) T. J. Shorts ( (Greece) Panathinaikos AKTOR)

=== MVP of the Round ===
Regular season

Round	Player	Team	PIR	Ref.
1	(United States) Kendrick Nunn	(Hellenic Basketball Federation) Panathinaikos AKTOR	29	
2	(Spain) Nikola Mirotić	(French Federation of Basketball) Monaco	32	
3	(Bulgaria) Sasha Vezenkov	(Hellenic Basketball Federation) Olympiacos	34	
4	(Nigeria) Jordan Nwora	(Basketball Federation of Serbia) Crvena zvezda Meridianbet	34	
5	(Bulgaria) Sasha Vezenkov (2)	(Hellenic Basketball Federation) Olympiacos	31	
6	(Israel) Roman Sorkin	(Israeli Basketball Association) Maccabi Tel Aviv	30	
7	(France) Sylvain Francisco	(Lithuanian Basketball Federation) Žalgiris	35	
7	(Nigeria) Chima Moneke	(Basketball Federation of Serbia) Crvena zvezda Meridianbet	35	
8	(Georgia (country)) Tornike Shengelia	(Spanish Basketball Federation) FC Barcelona	42	
9	(United States) Mike James	(French Federation of Basketball) Monaco	37	
10	(United States) Elijah Bryant	(Israeli Basketball Association) Hapoel IBI Tel Aviv	38	
11	(France) Isaïa Cordinier	(Turkish Basketball Federation) Anadolu Efes	29	
12	(France) Théo Maledon	(Spanish Basketball Federation) Real Madrid	34	
13	(United States) Kendrick Nunn (2)	(Hellenic Basketball Federation) Panathinaikos AKTOR	39	
13	(Denmark) Shavon Shields	(Italian Basketball Federation) EA7 Emporio Armani Milan	39	
14	(France) Élie Okobo	(French Federation of Basketball) Monaco	39	
15	(United States) Will Clyburn	(Spanish Basketball Federation) FC Barcelona	33	
15	(United States) Lonnie Walker IV	(Israeli Basketball Association) Maccabi Tel Aviv	33	
16	(United States) Elijah Bryant (2)	(Israeli Basketball Association) Hapoel IBI Tel Aviv	37	
17	(United States) Kevin Punter	(Spanish Basketball Federation) FC Barcelona	40	
18	(France) Bastien Vautier	(French Federation of Basketball) LDLC ASVEL	31	
19	(United States) Wade Baldwin IV	(Turkish Basketball Federation) Fenerbahçe Beko	29	
20	(Germany) Andreas Obst	(German Basketball Federation) Bayern Munich	38	
21	(Bulgaria) Sasha Vezenkov (3)	(Hellenic Basketball Federation) Olympiacos	35	
22	(Italy) Saliou Niang	(Italian Basketball Federation) Virtus Bologna	36	
23	(Nigeria) Ebuka Izundu	(Basketball Federation of Serbia) Crvena zvezda Meridianbet	36	
24	(United States) Kevin Punter (2)	(Spanish Basketball Federation) FC Barcelona	34	
25	(Greece) Kostas Sloukas	(Hellenic Basketball Federation) Panathinaikos AKTOR	36	
26	(Canada) Mfiondu Kabengele	(United Arab Emirates Basketball Association) Dubai Basketball	30	
27	(Dominican Republic) Jean Montero	(Spanish Basketball Federation) Valencia Basket	38	
28	(United States) Moses Wright	(Lithuanian Basketball Federation) Žalgiris	34	
29	(France) Sylvain Francisco (2)	(Lithuanian Basketball Federation) Žalgiris	36	
30	(Colombia) Braian Angola	(French Federation of Basketball) LDLC ASVEL	28	
31	(Turkey) Cedi Osman	(Hellenic Basketball Federation) Panathinaikos AKTOR	36	
32	(United States) Dwayne Bacon	(United Arab Emirates Basketball Association) Dubai Basketball	27	
32	(Israel) Tamir Blatt	(Israeli Basketball Association) Maccabi Tel Aviv	27	
33	(Nigeria) Chima Moneke (2)	(Basketball Federation of Serbia) Crvena zvezda Meridianbet	32	
34	(United States) Sterling Brown	(Basketball Federation of Serbia) Partizan Mozzart Bet	32	
35	(Hungary) Nate Reuvers	(Spanish Basketball Federation) Valencia Basket	44	
36	(Greece) Tyler Dorsey	(Hellenic Basketball Federation) Olympiacos	43	
37	(United States) Justin Robinson	(French Federation of Basketball) Paris Basketball	35	
38	(United States) Moses Wright (2)	(Lithuanian Basketball Federation) Žalgiris	43	

Play-in

Round	Player	Team	PIR	Ref.
Play-in	(North Macedonia) T. J. Shorts	(Hellenic Basketball Federation) Panathinaikos AKTOR	24	

Playoffs

Round	Player	Team	PIR	Ref.
1	(Serbia) Nikola Milutinov	(Hellenic Basketball Federation) Olympiacos	25	
2	(Argentina) Facundo Campazzo	(Spanish Basketball Federation) Real Madrid	30	
3	(Lithuania) Ąžuolas Tubelis	(Lithuanian Basketball Federation) Žalgiris	31	
4	(Dominican Republic) Jean Montero (2)	(Spanish Basketball Federation) Valencia Basket	45	
5	(Senegal) Brancou Badio	(Spanish Basketball Federation) Valencia Basket	25	

=== MVP of the Month ===
Month	Round	Player	Team	Ref.
2025
October	1–8	(France) Sylvain Francisco	(Lithuanian Basketball Federation) Žalgiris	
November	9–13	(United States) Kenneth Faried	(Hellenic Basketball Federation) Panathinaikos AKTOR	
December	14–18	(United States) Kevin Punter	(Spanish Basketball Federation) Barcelona	
2026
January	19–25	(Bulgaria) Sasha Vezenkov	(Hellenic Basketball Federation) Olympiacos	
February	26–29	(United States) McKinley Wright IV	(United Arab Emirates Basketball Association) Dubai Basketball	
March	30–34	(South Sudan) Carlik Jones	(Basketball Federation of Serbia) Partizan Mozzart Bet	

== Statistics ==
=== Individual statistics ===
==== Rating ====
Rank	Name	Team	Games	Rating	PIR
1.	(Bulgaria) Sasha Vezenkov	(Greece) Olympiacos	39	863	22.1
2.	(United States) Elijah Bryant	(Israel) Hapoel IBI Tel Aviv	38	744	19.6
3.	(Serbia) Nikola Milutinov	(Greece) Olympiacos	40	778	19.4

Source: EuroLeague

==== Points ====
Rank	Name	Team	Games	Points	PPG
1.	(Bulgaria) Sasha Vezenkov	(Greece) Olympiacos	39	759	19.0
2.	(France) Nadir Hifi	(France) Paris Basketball	37	699	18.9
3.	(United States) Kendrick Nunn	(Greece) Panathinaikos AKTOR	37	676	18.3

Source: EuroLeague

==== Rebounds ====
Rank	Name	Team	Games	Rebounds	RPG
1.	(Serbia) Nikola Milutinov	(Greece) Olympiacos	39	276	7.2
2.	(United States) Jaylen Hoard	(Israel) Maccabi Tel Aviv	35	247	7.1
3.	(Cape Verde) Edy Tavares	(Spain) Real Madrid	35	258	6.6

Source: EuroLeague

==== Assists ====
Rank	Name	Team	Games	Assists	APG
1.	(Bulgaria) Codi Miller-McIntyre	(Serbia) Crvena zvezda Meridianbet	39	289	7.4
2.	(France) Sylvain Francisco	(Lithuania) Žalgiris	43	275	6.5
2.	(United States) Mike James	(France) AS Monaco	39	252	6.5

Source: EuroLeague

== Attendances ==
Pos	Team	Total	High	Low	Average	Change
1	(Hellenic Basketball Federation) Panathinaikos AKTOR	408,529	19,033	15,603	18,570	+6.3%
2	(Basketball Federation of Serbia) Crvena zvezda Meridianbet	340,123	20,787	5,672	17,901	−1.9%^{2}
3	(Basketball Federation of Serbia) Partizan Mozzart Bet	290,316	21,854	1,093	15,280	−17.6%^{3}
4	(Lithuanian Basketball Federation) Žalgiris	312,489	15,428	14,430	14,880	+0.1%
5	(Spanish Basketball Federation) Valencia Basket	265,869	15,600	7,994	12,660	n/a^{1,16}
6	(Hellenic Basketball Federation) Olympiacos	257,357	12,750	10,540	12,255	+5.4%
7	(German Basketball Federation) Bayern Munich	206,369	11,500	8,726	10,862	−0.3%
8	(Turkish Basketball Federation) Fenerbahçe Beko	212,382	12,873	2,541	10,113	−7.5%^{8}
9	(Spanish Basketball Federation) Real Madrid	170,726	12,156	6,588	8,986	−2.7%^{9}
10	(Spanish Basketball Federation) Kosner Baskonia	148,524	14,114	7,234	8,737	−7.8%^{10}
11	(French Federation of Basketball) LDLC ASVEL	143,206	11,536	4,637	7,537	+2.3%^{4}
12	(French Federation of Basketball) Paris Basketball	133,866	12,440	3,352	7,046	−7.5%^{5}
13	(Italian Basketball Federation) Virtus Bologna	128,343	10,102	3,631	6,755	−13.4%^{7}
14	(Turkish Basketball Federation) Anadolu Efes	126,691	10,000	3,333	6,668	−30.3%^{15}
15	(Italian Basketball Federation) EA7 Emporio Armani Milan	113,741	10,396	3,339	5,986	−34.6%^{6}
16	(United Arab Emirates Basketball Association) Dubai Basketball	99,584	7,648	4,651	5,858	n/a^{1,11}
17	(Spanish Basketball Federation) Barcelona	99,254	7,294	4,125	5,514	−11.7%^{14}
18	(Israeli Basketball Association) Hapoel IBI Tel Aviv	104,605	10,920	780	4,981	n/a^{1,12}
19	(French Federation of Basketball) Monaco	93,750	5,000	3,898	4,464	+9.7%
20	(Israeli Basketball Association) Maccabi Rapyd Tel Aviv	63,271	10,369	68	3,330	+1,671.3%^{13}
	League total	3,718,995	21,854	68	9,536	−9.5%

Updated to match(es) played on 13 May 2026. Source: EuroLeague
Notes:
1: Team did not participate in the last EuroLeague regular season.
2: Crvena zvezda Meridianbet played one game at Aleksandar Nikolić Hall instead of Belgrade Arena.
3: Partizan Mozzart Bet played one game at Aleksandar Nikolić Hall and one at BMW Park in Munich instead of Belgrade Arena.
4: LDLC ASVEL played 12 games at LDLC Arena and 7 games at Astroballe.
5: Paris Basketball played 2 games at Accor Arena.
6: EA7 Emporio Armani Milan played 10 games at Allianz Cloud Arena instead of Unipol Forum.
7: Virtus Bologna played 6 games at PalaDozza and 13 games at Virtus Arena.
8: Fenerbahçe Beko games against Maccabi Rapyd Tel Aviv and Hapoel IBI Tel Aviv were relocated to SAP Garden in Munich, Germany due to security concerns.
9: Real Madrid games against Maccabi Rapyd Tel Aviv and Hapoel IBI Tel Aviv were behind closed doors due to security concerns. The playoff matches against Hapoel IBI Tel Aviv were played at reduced capacity.
10: Kosner Baskonia games against Maccabi Rapyd Tel Aviv and Hapoel IBI Tel Aviv were behind closed doors due to security concerns.
11: Dubai Basketball played 5 games at Zetra Arena and 1 game at Arena Zenica in Sarajevo and Zenica, Bosnia and Herzegovina due to the Iran war.
12: Hapoel IBI Tel Aviv played 5 games at Menora Mivtachim Arena, 1 game at Pais Arena in Jerusalem, 11 games at Arena 8888 in Sofia and 4 games at Arena Botevgrad in Botevgrad, Bulgaria due to the Gaza and Iran wars.
13: Maccabi Rapyd Tel Aviv played 6 games at Menora Mivtachim Arena and 13 games at Aleksandar Nikolic Hall in Belgrade, Serbia due to the Gaza and Iran wars.
14: Barcelona games against Maccabi Rapyd Tel Aviv and Hapoel IBI Tel Aviv were behind closed doors due to security concerns.
15: Anadolu Efes games against Maccabi Rapyd Tel Aviv and Hapoel IBI Tel Aviv were relocated to Morača Sports Center in Podgorica, Montenegro due to security concerns.
16: Valencia Basket game Hapoel IBI Tel Aviv was behind closed doors due to security concerns.
