= Dimitrios Charitopoulos =

Greek professional basketball player

Dimitrios Charitopoulos Δημήτρης Χαριτόπουλος
No. 15 – Iraklis Thessaloniki
- Position: Center / power forward
- League: Greek A2 Basket League

Personal information
- Born: November 14, 1983 (age 43) Alexandria, Greece
- Listed height: 6 ft 9.5 in (2.07 m)
- Listed weight: 250 lb (113 kg)

Career information
- Playing career: 2002–present

Career history
- 2002–2006: Aris Thessaloniki
- 2006–2008: PAOK Thessaloniki
- 2008–2009: Trikala 2000
- 2009–2010: Panionios
- 2010–2012: Maroussi
- 2012: ASVEL
- 2012–2013: PAOK Thessaloniki
- 2013: Lukoil Academic
- 2013–2014: Valladolid
- 2014–2015: Manresa
- 2015: PAOK Thessaloniki
- 2015–2016: Koroivos Amaliadas
- 2016–2017: AEK Athens
- 2017–2018: Iraklis Thessaloniki
- 2018–2020: Ifaistos Limnou
- 2020–2021: Aris Thessaloniki
- 2021–2023: Iraklis Thessaloniki
- 2024–2025: Pallesviakos

Career highlights
- FIBA Europe Cup champion (2003); Greek Cup winner (2004); Bulgarian League champion (2013)
Medals
Men's basketball
Representing Greece
Mediterranean Games
Silver medal – second place	2005 Almería	Under-26
FIBA Europe Under-20 Championship
Gold medal – first place	2002 Almería	Under-20

Dimitrios Charitopoulos (alternate spellings: Dimitris, Haritopoulos) (Greek: Δημήτρης Χαριτόπουλος; born November 14, 1983) is a Greek professional basketball player and the team captain. He is 2.07 m (6 ft 9 1/2 in) tall, and he weighs 113 kg (250 lbs). He is a power forward-center.

== Professional career ==
After playing in the Greek minors with G.S. Siatistas, Charitopoulos began his professional career with Aris during the 2002–03 season. He moved to PAOK in 2006. In February 2012, he joined ASVEL. In September 2013, he signed with Spanish club CB Valladolid.

For the 2014–15 season, he signed with La Bruixa d'Or Manresa of Spain's Liga ACB, where he averaged 4.2 points in 17 games. On January 30, 2015, he left the Spanish club. Three days later, he signed with his former team, PAOK.

On August 31, 2016, Charitopoulos signed a one-year contract with AEK Athens of the Greek Basket League.

== National team career ==
Charitopoulos was a member of the junior national teams of Greece. With Greece's junior national team, he won the gold medal at the 2002 FIBA Europe Under-20 Championship. Charitopoulos also won the silver medal at the 2005 Mediterranean Games, while playing with Greece's under-26 national selection.

== Career statistics ==
=== FIBA Champions League ===
Year	Team	GP	MPG	FG%	3P%	FT%	RPG	APG	SPG	BPG	PPG
2016–17	AEK	7	7.3	.692	.500	.800	1.1	.6	.4	0	3.3

=== Domestic Leagues ===
==== Regular season ====
Legend
GP	Games played	MPG	Minutes per game	FG%	Field goal percentage
3P%	3-point field goal percentage	FT%	Free throw percentage	RPG	Rebounds per game
APG	Assists per game	SPG	Steals per game	BPG	Blocks per game
PPG	Points per game	**Bold**	Career high		Led the league

Note: Only games in the primary domestic competitions are included. Therefore, games in cup or European competitions are left out.

Year	Team	League	GP	MPG	FG%	3P%	FT%	RPG	APG	SPG	BPG	PPG
2015–16	Koroivos	GBL	23	23.0	.512	.350	.743	3.2	.8	.4	.1	8.4
2016–17	A.E.K.	GBL	18	6.3	.308	.250	.600	1.1	.3	.1	0	.8
2018–19	Ifaistos	GBL	23	10.4	.493	.370	.690	2.3	.6	.3	0	4.2

== Awards and accomplishments ==
- 2002 FIBA Europe Under-20 Championship: Gold
- FIBA Europe Champions Cup Champion: (2003)
- Greek Cup Winner: (2004)
- Greek Youth All-Star Game MVP: (2005)
- 2005 Mediterranean Games: Silver
- Bulgarian League Champion: (2013)
