= Dimitris Kalaitzidis (basketball) =

Greek basketball player

Dimitris Kalaitzidis Δημήτρης Καλαϊτζίδης
Gefyra
- Position: Guard / small forward
- League: Greek 3rd division

Personal information
- Born: February 15, 1985 (age 41) Thessaloniki, Greece
- Listed height: 6 ft 6 in (1.98 m)
- Listed weight: 210 lb (95 kg)

Career information
- NBA draft: 2007: undrafted
- Playing career: 2002–present

Career history
- 2002–2005: Iraklis Thessaloniki
- 2005–2006: Olympiacos
- 2006–2007: Olympias Patras
- 2007–2009: Panellinios
- 2009–2010: PAOK Thessaloniki
- 2010–2011: APOEL
- 2011–2012: Panellinios
- 2012–2013: KAOD
- 2013–2016: Kavala
- 2016–2020: Iraklis Thessaloniki
- 2020–2021: Aris Thessaloniki
- 2021–present: Gefyra

Career highlights
- Greek 2nd Division champion (2015)
Medals
Men's basketball
Representing Greece
Mediterranean Games
Silver medal – second place	2009 Pescara	Under-26

Dimitris Kalaitzidis (alternate spelling: Dimitrios) (Greek: Δημήτρης Καλαϊτζίδης; born February 15, 1985) is a Greek professional basketball player for Gefyra of the Greek 3rd division. He is a 6'6' (1.98 m) tall shooting guard–small forward.

== Professional career ==
Some of the clubs that Kalaitzidis has played with during his pro career include: Iraklis Thessaloniki, Olympiacos, Panellinios, APOEL. In the summer of 2012 Kalaitzidis signed for Greek Basket League Team KAOD. He joined Kavala in the summer of 2013.

On 23 July 2016, Kalaitzidis signed a contract with Iraklis Thessaloniki of the Greek A2, returning in the team after 11 years.

On 23 September 2020, he signed with Aris Thessaloniki of the Greek Basket League. On 26 July 2021, Kalaitzidis signed with Gefyra, opting for the first time in his career to play in the 3rd division.

== National team career ==
Kalaitzidis was a member of the junior national teams of Greece. With Greece's junior national teams, he played at the 2004 FIBA Europe Under-20 Championship, and the 2005 FIBA Europe Under-20 Championship

== Personal life ==
Kalaitzidis was raised in Pefka, and he has a degree in Civil Engineering.
