= Mario Little =

American basketball player

Free agent
- Position: Small forward / shooting guard

Personal information
- Born: December 29, 1987 (age 38) Chicago, Illinois, U.S.
- Listed height: 6 ft 6 in (1.98 m)
- Listed weight: 218 lb (99 kg)

Career information
- High school: George Washington (Chicago, Illinois)
- College: Chipola College (2006–2008); Kansas (2008–2011)
- NBA draft: 2011: undrafted
- Playing career: 2011–present

Career history
- 2011–2012: Dnipro-Azot Dniprodzerzhynsk
- 2012–2015: Tulsa 66ers / Oklahoma City Blue
- 2015: Manresa
- 2015–2016: Anyang KGC
- 2016: TNT KaTropa
- 2016: Changwon LG Sakers
- 2016: Seoul SK Knights
- 2016–2017: Changwon LG Sakers
- 2017: Maccabi Ashdod
- 2017: Guaros de Lara
- 2017–2018: VL Pesaro
- 2018: Guaros de Lara
- 2018–2019: Zadar
- 2019–2020: Ifaistos Limnou
- 2020–2021: Aris Thessaloniki
- 2021–2022: Levski Sofia
- 2023: Al-Rayyan
- 2023: Trotamundos de Carabobo

Career highlights
- Venezuelan League champion (2018)

Mario Deantwan Little (born December 29, 1987) is an American professional basketball player who last played for Trotamundos de Carabobo of the Superliga Profesional de Baloncesto. He played college basketball for Chipola College and Kansas before beginning his professional career in Ukraine. After three years in the NBA Development League, Little began an overseas career that spanned Europe, Asia, the Middle East, and South America.

== High school career ==
Little attended George Washington High School in Chicago, Illinois, where as a senior in 2005–06, he averaged 22 points, 12 rebounds, seven assists, three steals and three blocks per game.

== College career ==
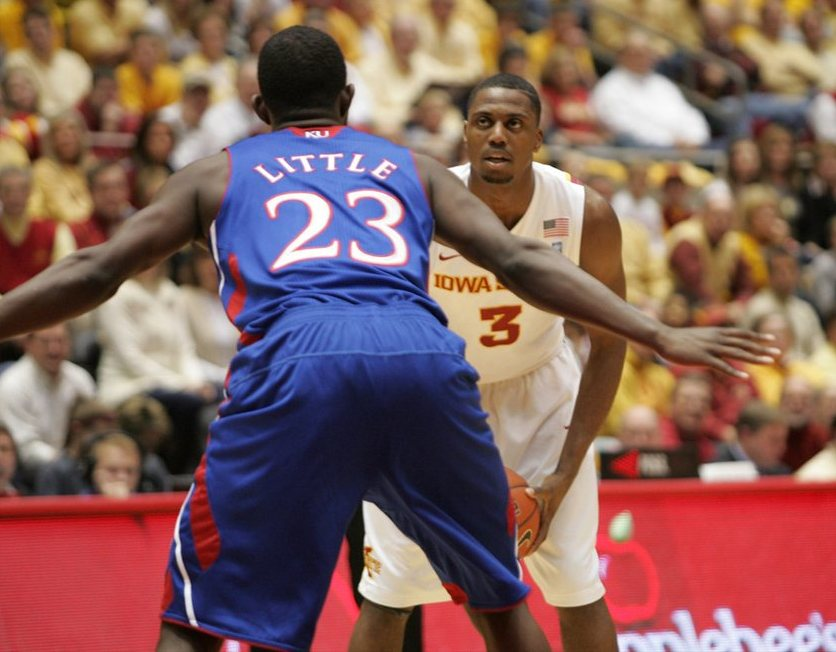
Little guarding Melvin Ejim in January 2011

Little played his first two college seasons at Chipola College, where he was named Sixth Man of the Year as a freshman, before being named both Player of the Year in the Panhandle Conference and an NJCAA All-American as a sophomore.

In 2008, Little joined the Kansas Jayhawks. However, his first season as a Jayhawk resulted in him playing just 23 games due to injury. Little decided to redshirt the 2009–10 season in order to give his surgically repaired lower left leg time to heal. As a senior in 2010–11, Little served suspension between December 16 and January 12 after he was arrested on charges of battery, criminal damage and criminal trespassing following a pre-dawn fight with his girlfriend and others. In 32 games as a senior, he averaged 5.1 points and 2.9 rebounds in 13.7 minutes per game.

== Professional career ==
Little's professional career began in December 2011 with Ukrainian team Dnipro-Azot Dniprodzerzhynsk. In 20 games for Dnipro, he averaged 11.8 points, 6.6 rebounds and 2.8 assists per game.

For the 2012–13 season, Little joined the Tulsa 66ers of the NBA Development League. He saw limited action during the 2012–13 season, an experience he described as humbling. He returned to Tulsa for the 2013–14 season and was one of the top scorers on the team. After a Summer League stint with the Oklahoma City Thunder, Little returned to the Tulsa 66ers for the 2014–15 season, with the franchise now known as the Oklahoma City Blue. However, his third season was cut short after being released in January 2015.

In March 2015, Little had a four-game stint in Spain with Bàsquet Manresa, before an injury saw him be replaced in the line-up by D. J. Seeley.

For the 2015–16 season, Little played in South Korea for Anyang KGC. He remained in the area during the off-season, as he had a four-game stint with Filipino team TNT KaTropa during the 2016 PBA Governors' Cup. He then returned to Korea for the 2016–17 season, beginning with Changwon LG Sakers, then having a seven-game stint with Seoul SK Knights in December, and then returning to LG Sakers for the rest of the season.

In March 2017, Little moved to Israel and joined Maccabi Ashdod.

In September 2017, Little played for Venezuelan team Guaros de Lara in the FIBA Intercontinental Cup, a game Guaros de Lara lost 76–71 to Iberostar Tenerife.

For the 2017–18 season, Little played in Italy for VL Pesaro, but he only managed eight games after missing a large chuck of the season with an injury.

Between March and July 2018, Little played for Guaros de Lara in the Liga Americas and the LPB.

On August 3, 2018, Little signed with Croatian team KK Zadar.

On August 15, 2019, Little signed with Ifaistos Limnou of the Greek Basket League. He left the team in January 2020 after averaging 9.9 points, 2.1 rebounds and 1.7 assists in 14 games.

On October 11, 2020, Little signed with Aris Thessaloniki.

For the 2021–22 season, Little joined Levski Sofia of the Bulgarian National Basketball League (NBL).

In January 2023, Little joined Al-Rayyan of the Qatari Basketball League. Two months later, he joined Trotamundos de Carabobo of the Superliga Profesional de Baloncesto.

== NBA D-League career statistics ==
Legend
GP	Games played	GS	Games started	MPG	Minutes per game
FG%	Field goal percentage	3P%	3-point field goal percentage	FT%	Free throw percentage
RPG	Rebounds per game	APG	Assists per game	SPG	Steals per game
BPG	Blocks per game	PPG	Points per game	**Bold**	Career high

=== Regular season ===
Year	Team	GP	GS	MPG	FG%	3P%	FT%	RPG	APG	SPG	BPG	PPG
2012–13	Tulsa 66ers	15	1	12.4	.375	.167	1.000	2.1	.9	.4	.3	3.9
2013–14	Tulsa 66ers	50	47	36.2	.417	.366	.849	4.2	2.6	1.1	.2	18.8
2014–15	Oklahoma City Blue	22	19	31.8	.410	.375	.846	3.8	3.0	.9	.2	13.4
Career		87	67	31.0	.413	.356	.852	3.7	2.4	1.0	.2	14.9

=== Playoffs ===
Year	Team	GP	GS	MPG	FG%	3P%	FT%	RPG	APG	SPG	BPG	PPG
2012–13	Tulsa 66ers	3	1	21.5	.500	.286	.333	2.0	.7	.7	.0	7.0
Career		3	1	21.5	.500	.286	.333	2.0	.7	.7	.0	7.0
