= Quenton DeCosey =

American basketball player (born 1994)

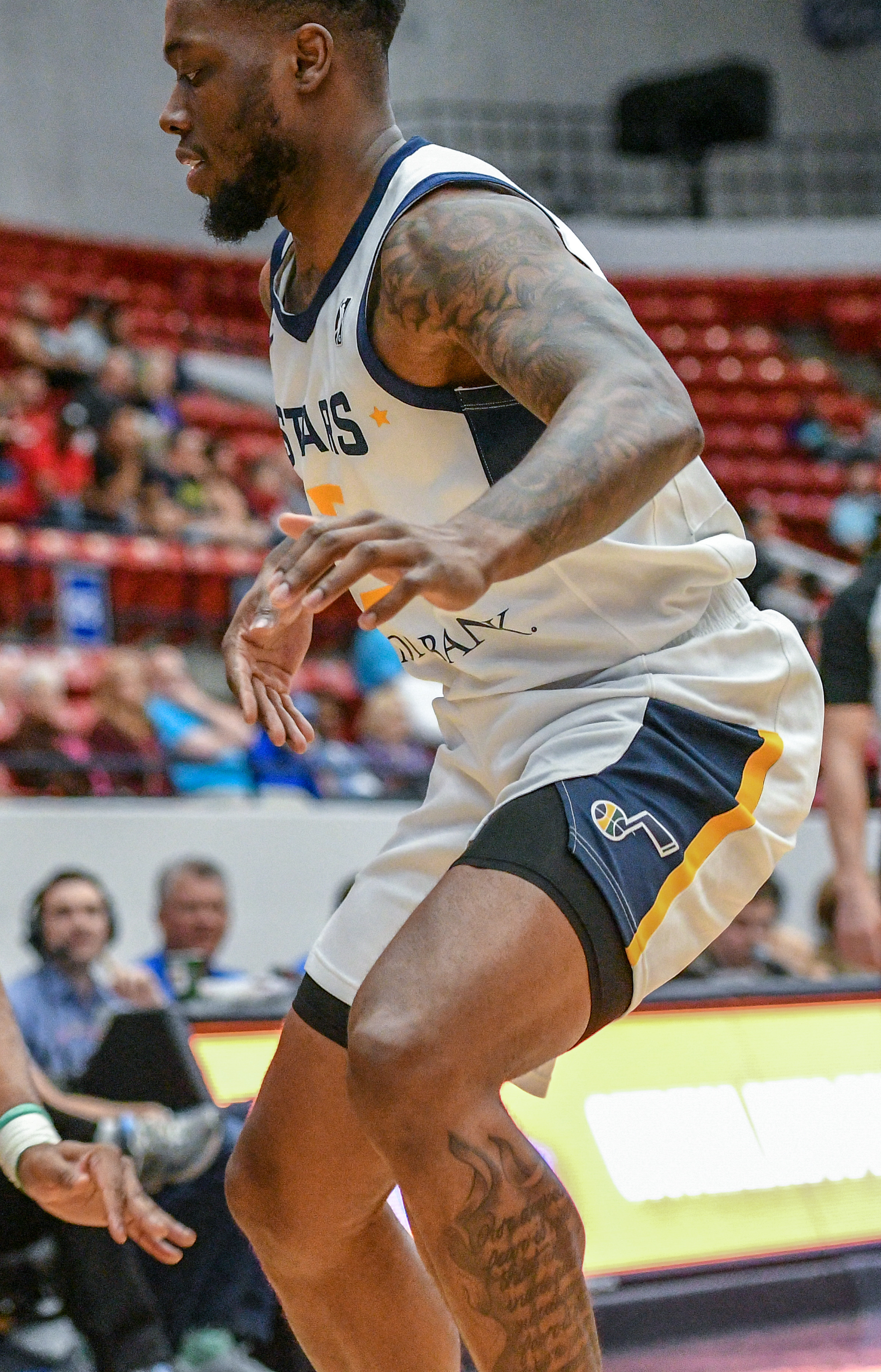
- DeCosey in action with Salt Lake City Stars.

Free Agent
- Position: Shooting guard / small forward

Personal information
- Born: August 8, 1994 (age 32) Union Township, New Jersey
- Listed height: 6 ft 5 in (1.96 m)
- Listed weight: 205 lb (93 kg)

Career information
- High school: St. Joseph (Metuchen, New Jersey)
- College: Temple (2012–2016)
- NBA draft: 2016: undrafted
- Playing career: 2016–present

Career history
- 2016–2017: Universo Treviso
- 2017: Pallacanestro Chieti
- 2017–2018: Koroivos Amaliadas
- 2018–2019: Maine Red Claws
- 2019: Salt Lake City Stars
- 2019–2020: Lavrio
- 2020–2021: Aris Thessaloniki
- 2021: Start Lublin
- 2021–2022: ZTE KK
- 2022–2023: Alba Fehérvár
- 2023: Saskatchewan Rattlers
- 2023–2024: Rabotnički

Career highlights
- First-team All-AAC (2016)

Quenton D. DeCosey Jr. (born August 8, 1994) is an American professional basketball player who last played for Rabotnički of the Macedonian First League. He played for Temple University men's basketball for four years before turning professional in 2016.

== High school career ==
DeCosey, a native of Union, New Jersey attended St. Joseph High School, a Catholic all-boys school in Metuchen, New Jersey. He played varsity basketball from grades 10–12, leading his team its first ever state title just before graduating in 2012. During his senior year, he averaged 24.0 points, 8.0 rebounds, 4.0 assists. He also, joined the school's 1,000 point club having scored 1,608 points during his career and currently, he holds the highest career scoring average out of all players that came through the program. He played alongside Karl-Anthony Towns of the Minnesota Timberwolves for a year before graduating and committing to Temple University in Philadelphia, Pennsylvania.

== College career ==
In a program that rarely allows freshman premium playing time, DeCosey averaged 1.9 points, 1.1 rebounds, and 0.4 assists having played only 195 minutes during his entire year. Many began to see how vital the shooting guard would be during the coming years when he scored 13 points in 18 minutes in a loss against the Duke Blue Devils.

During the 2013–2014 year, DeCosey saw his playing time increase drastically. He went on to average 15.4 points, making him 8th in the American Athletic Conference in Points Scored Per Game for the season.

In his junior year, DeCosey was named to Second Team All-Philadelphia Big 5. He averaged 12.3 points per game and 4.6 rebounds. He led in scoring in 11 games and recorded his first career double-double with a game-high 21 points and career-best 11 rebounds in a NIT Quarterfinal win over Louisiana Tech.

As a senior, DeCosey led his team to win the AAC regular season. His performance throughout the year and overall leadership of his team helped them make their way into the 2016 NCAA tournament.

One of the biggest moments of DeCosey's college career came during the last few seconds of regulation in their 1st-round game against Iowa in the NCAA tournament. DeCosey was fouled on a three-point shot attempt at the buzzer. He went on to make all three foul shots, sending the game into overtime. DeCosey scored a game-high 26 points on 10–22 shooting in the overtime loss.

He was one of two players from the American Athletic Conference selected as a unanimous decision for First Team All-Conference, putting him in the running for Player of the Year. He also was named to All-Philadelphia Big 5 First Team and NABC All-District First Team.

DeCosey left Temple as the 51st player in program history to reach 1,000 career points. By the end of his career, he scored 1,513 to rank 16th all-time in program history. He averaged 15.9 points per game during the 2015–16 season, (1st on Team, 3rd in Conference).

== Professional career ==
After going undrafted in the 2016 NBA Draft, DeCosey joined the San Antonio Spurs for the 2016 NBA Summer League and on July 29, 2016, he signed with Universo Treviso. On February 15, 2017, he left Trevisio and signed with Pallacanestro Chieti for the rest of the season.

On September 5, 2017, DeCosey joined Koroivos of the Greek Basket League. In October 2018 DeCosey was added to the training camp roster of the Maine Red Claws.

After a stint with the Salt Lake City Stars, DeCosey returned to Greece and signed with Lavrio on the day of his birthday, August 8, 2019. On September 22, 2020, he joined Aris Thessaloniki of the Greek Basket League. He played 20 games with them, averaging 10.3 points (48.1% from the two-point line, 36.9% from behind the arc), 3.4 rebounds, 1.4 assists, and 1.1 steals per game. On August 26, 2021, DeCosey signed with Start Lublin of the Polish Basketball League. He averaged 5.0 points and 2.8 rebounds per game. On December 21, DeCosey signed with ZTE KK of the Hungarian Nemzeti Bajnokság I/A.

On June 27, 2023, DeCosey signed with the Saskatchewan Rattlers of the Canadian Elite Basketball League.

On August 11, 2023, DeCosey signed with Rabotnički of the Macedonian First League.

== The Basketball Tournament ==
Quenton Decosey played for Hall In in the 2018 edition of The Basketball Tournament. In 2 games, he averaged 14.5 points, 8 rebounds, and 2 blocks per game. Hall In reached the second round before falling to the Golden Eagles.
