= Ioannis Kouzeloglou =

Greek basketball player

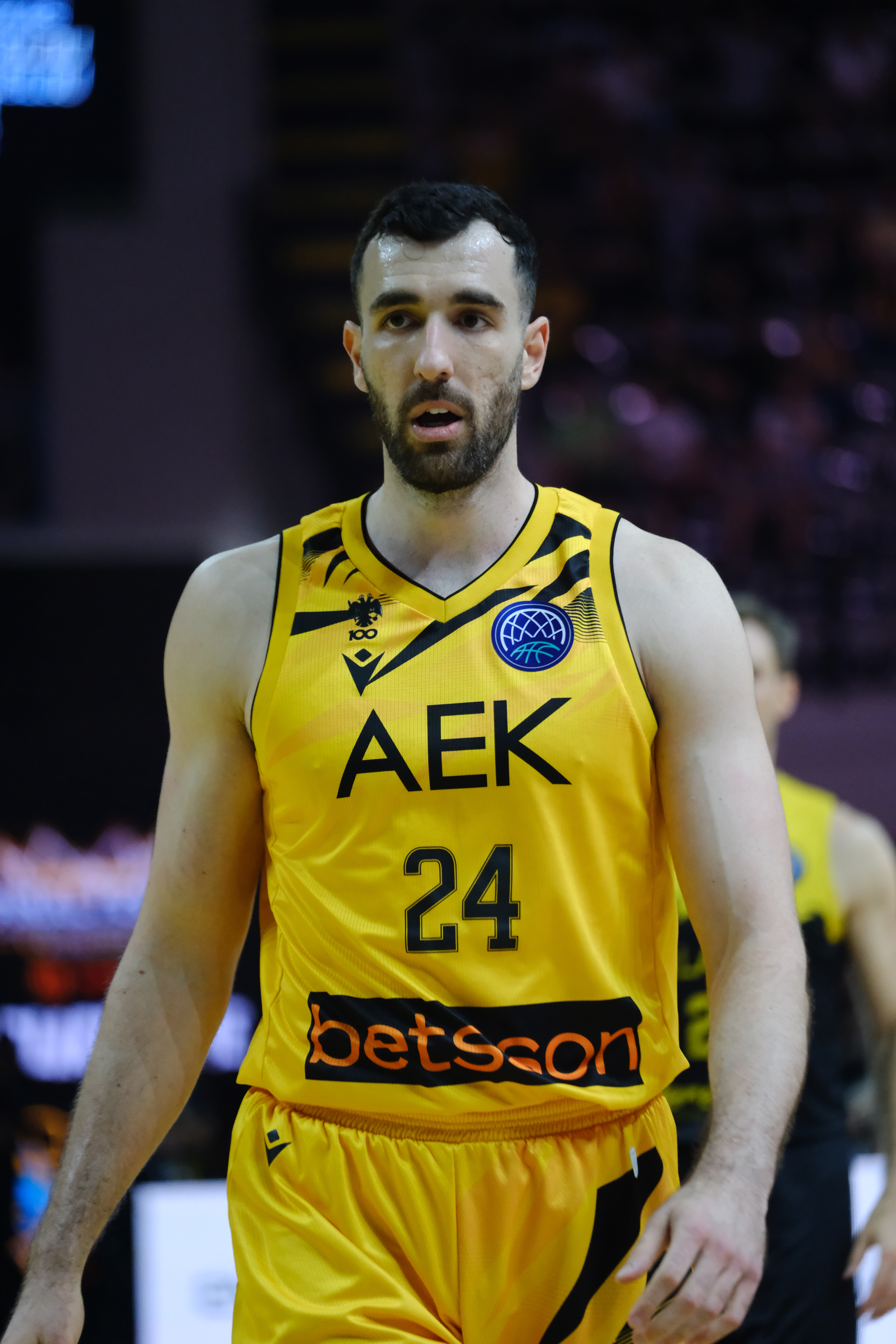
- Kouzeloglou with AEK Athens in 2025

No. 24 – Panathinaikos
- Position: Center / power forward
- League: Greek Basketball League; EuroLeague

Personal information
- Born: April 1, 1995 (age 31) Thessaloniki, Greece
- Listed height: 2.07 m (6 ft 9 in)
- Listed weight: 95 kg (209 lb)

Career information
- NBA draft: 2017: undrafted
- Playing career: 2014–present

Career history
- 2014–2015: Partizan
- 2015–2017: Apollon Patras
- 2017–2020: Lavrio
- 2020–2021: Aris Thessaloniki
- 2021: Élan Béarnais
- 2021: Iraklis Thessaloniki
- 2021–2022: AEK Athens
- 2022–2023: Lavrio
- 2023: San Pablo Burgos
- 2023–2025: AEK Athens
- 2025–present: Panathinaikos
- 2026: →Maroussi

Ioannis Kouzeloglou (alternate spelling: Giannis) (Greek: Γιάννης Κουζέλογλου, born on April 1, 1995) is a Greek professional basketball player for Panathinaikos of the Greek Basketball League and the EuroLeague. Standing at 2.07 m (6'9½") tall, he plays at the power forward and center positions.

== Professional career ==
Kouzeloglou started his basketball career in the Greek basketball academy Mantoulidis Schools.

On September 3, 2014, he signed a four–year deal with the Serbian Adriatic League team Partizan. The Greek player spent the 2014–15 season playing mostly for Partizan's junior team, but he also managed to make four appearances with the first team. Kouzeloglou parted ways with Partizan on October 26, 2015.

On October 28, 2015, he agreed to terms with the Greek Basket League club Apollon Patras, where played the next two seasons.

On July 4, 2017, he signed with Lavrio. During the 2019–20 season, Kouzeloglou was named team captain.

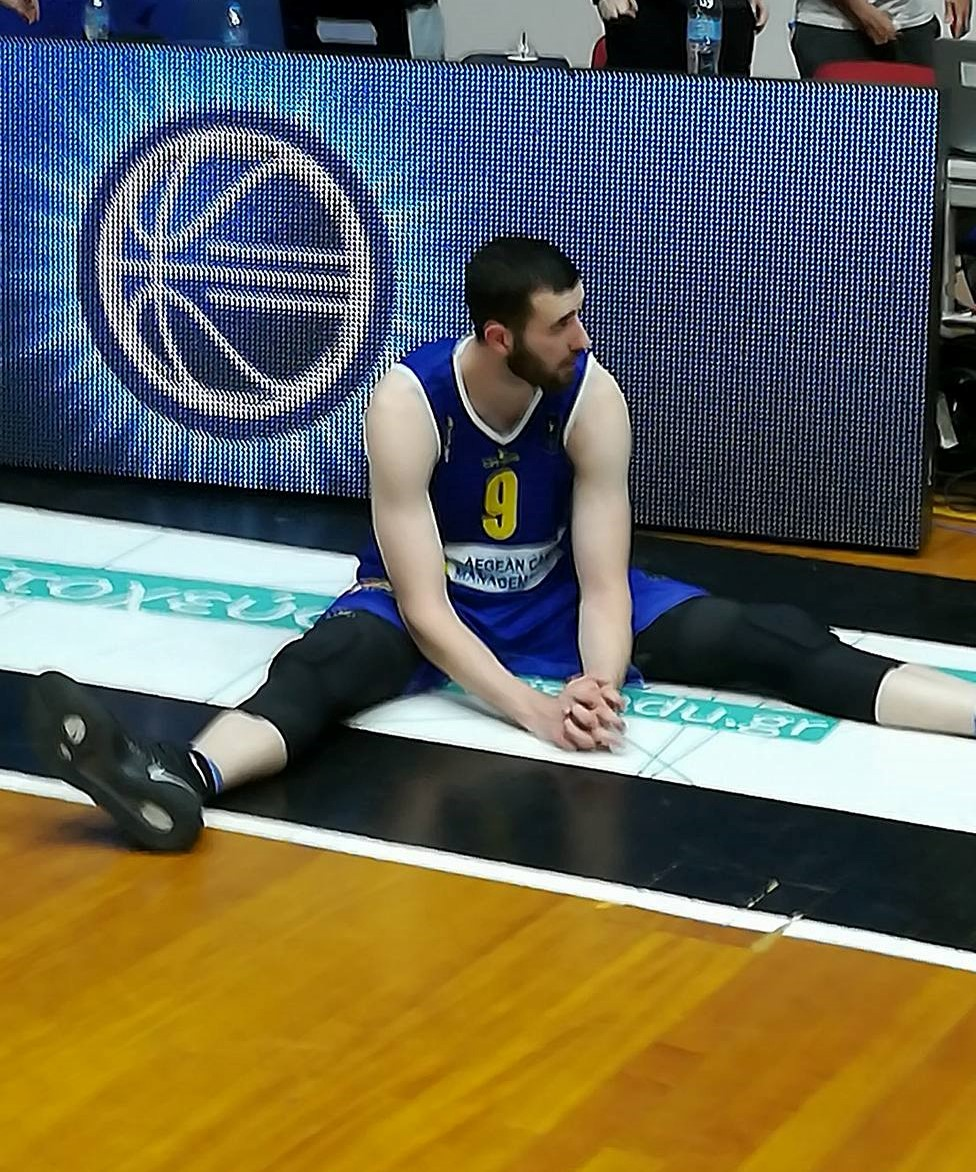
Kouzeloglou with Lavrio in 2018

On September 20, 2020, he signed with Aris Thessaloniki. After a very successful season (career-high averages of 10.5 points and 7.2 rebounds per contest in a total of 21 games), which also brought him into the ranks of the senior national team, Kouzeloglou amicably parted ways with the Greek team in order to join the French club Élan Béarnais Pau-Orthez.

On July 24, 2021, he returned to Greece for Iraklis Thessaloniki. On December 31, 2021, he parted ways with the team over the legality of his contract submitted to the league authorities. On the same day, Kouzeloglou signed with AEK Athens for the rest of the season. In 26 league games (16 with AEK and 10 with Iraklis), he averaged 9 points, 6 rebounds and 0.9 assists in 23 minutes per contest.

On November 24, 2022, Kouzeloglou made his return to Lavrio after two years. On February 28, 2023, he moved to Spanish club San Pablo Burgos for the rest of the season.

On July 4, 2023, Kouzeloglou returned to AEK Athens, signing a two-year contract.

On July 9, 2025, Kouzeloglou signed a two-year deal with EuroLeague powerhouse Panathinaikos as an auxiliary player. On January 1, 2026, he was loaned to Maroussi for the rest of the season. On March 25, 2026, Kouzeloglou returned from his loan to Panathinaikos for the rest of the season, after the Greens terminated their contract with Richaun Holmes.

== Greek national team ==
Kouzeloglou also played with the junior national teams of Greece. With Greece's junior national teams, he played at the 2013 FIBA Europe Under-18 Championship and the 2014 FIBA Europe Under-20 Championship.
