= Francesco Tabellini =

Italian basketball coach (born 1983)

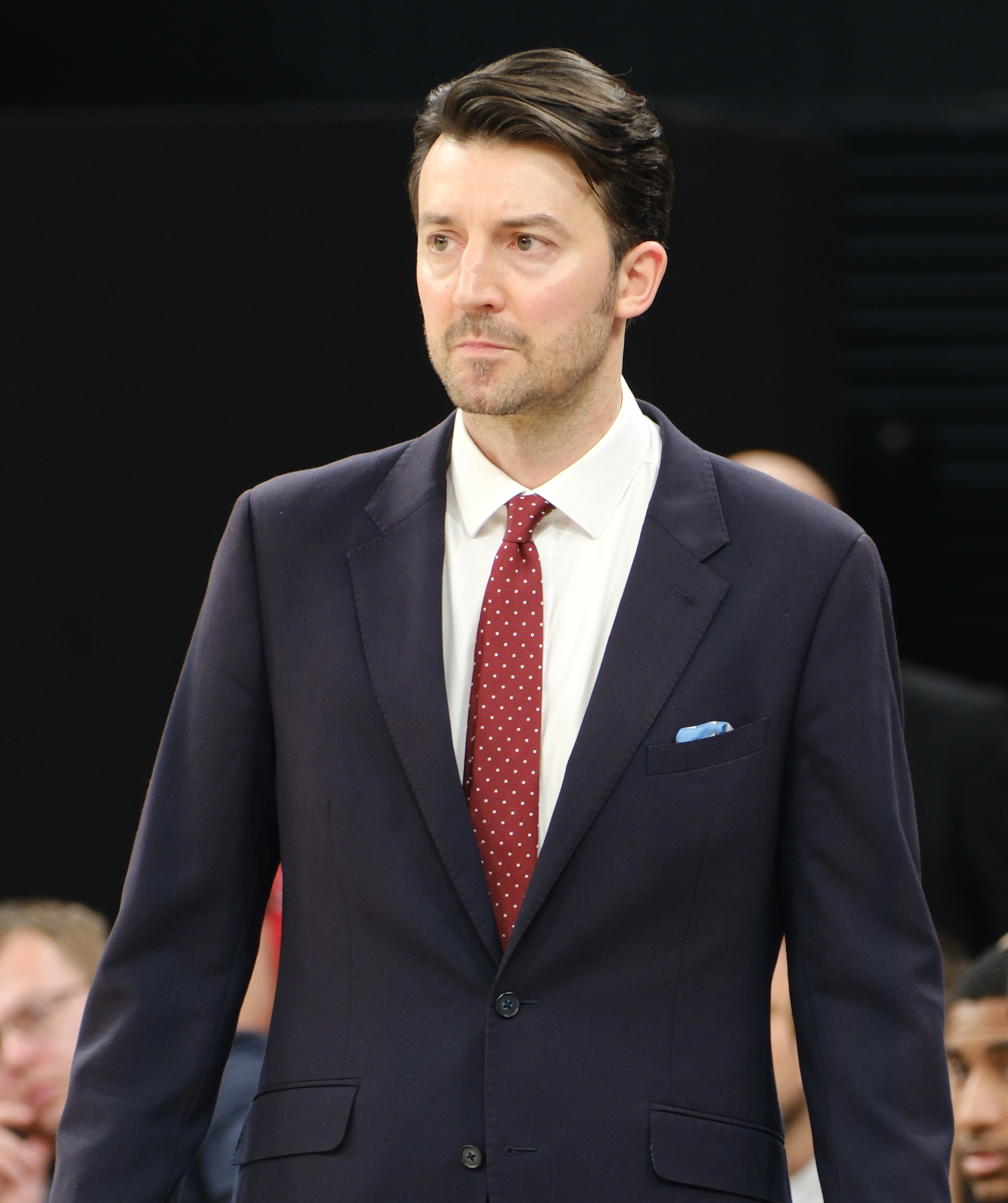
- Tabellini coaching Nymburk in 2025

Personal information
- Born: 18 August 1983 (age 43) Modena, Italy
- Position: Head coach
- Coaching career: 2014–present

Career history

Coaching
- 2014–2022: Treviso (assistant)
- 2022–2023: USK Praha
- 2023–2025: Nymburk
- 2025–2026: Paris Basketball

Career highlights
- As head coach: 2x Czech League champion (2024, 2025); 2x Czech Cup winner (2024, 2025); 2x Czech-Slovak Cup winner (2024, 2025)

Francesco Tabellini (born 18 August 1983) is an Italian basketball coach, who last worked as the head coach of Paris Basketball in LNB Élite and EuroLeague.

== Coaching career ==
Tabellini started as a youth coach in Treviso and was later promoted to an assistant coach position of the first team.

In 2022, he moved on to the Czech Republic and started as the head coach of USK Praha. One season later he joined Nymburk, and guided the team to win two consecutive Czech championships, two Czech Cups and two Czech-Slovak Cups. Nymburk also advanced to the quarter finals of the Basketball Champions League in the 2024–25 season.

On 30 June 2025, Tabellini was named the head coach of Paris Basketball in LNB Élite and EuroLeague on a two-year deal. He was fired on 23 March 2026, after Paris had lost all chances of qualifying for the EuroLeague playoffs, as well as being a disappointing 3rd in the LNB Élite standings, amidst a three game losing streak.
