= 2024 Israeli Basketball State Cup =

Israeli Basketball State Cup season

Tournament details
- Country: Israel
- Dates: 27 March – 16 May 2024
- Teams: 13
- Defending champions: Hapoel Jerusalem

Final positions
- Champions: Hapoel Jerusalem
- Runners-up: Maccabi Tel Aviv
- Semifinalists: Hapoel Be'er Sheva; Ironi Kiryat Ata

Tournament statistics
- Matches played: 12

Awards
- MVP: (United States) Speedy Smith
- All statistics correct as of 16 May 2024.

The 2024 Israeli Basketball State Cup, for sponsorships reasons the Migdal State Cup, was the 64th edition of the Israeli Basketball State Cup, organized by the Israeli Basketball Association.

On 21 February 2024, the Israeli Basketball Association announced the new format following the impact of the Gaza war on the 2023–24 Premier League regular season. The top three teams at the end of the Primer League first half of the regular season qualify for the quarter-finals, and the remaining teams (4–13) qualify for the first round.

== Qualified teams ==
Pos	Team	Pld	W	L	PF	PA	PD	PCT	Qualification
1	Hapoel Tel Aviv	12	11	1	1156	1001	+155	.917	Qualified for the Quarterfinals
2	Maccabi Tel Aviv	12	10	2	1091	975	+116	.833	Qualified for the Quarterfinals
3	Maccabi Ironi Ramat Gan	12	8	4	965	925	+40	.667	Qualified for the Quarterfinals
4	Bnei Herzliya	12	8	4	983	974	+9	.667	Qualified for the First round
5	Hapoel Holon	12	7	5	978	932	+46	.583	Qualified for the First round
6	Hapoel Jerusalem	12	7	5	992	946	+46	.583	Qualified for the First round
7	Ironi Ness Ziona	12	6	6	997	989	+8	.500	Qualified for the First round
8	Ironi Kiryat Ata	12	5	7	977	1008	−31	.417	Qualified for the First round
9	Hapoel Eilat	12	4	8	926	1033	−107	.333	Qualified for the First round
10	Hapoel Afula	12	4	8	1003	1000	+3	.333	Qualified for the First round
11	Hapoel Galil Elyon	12	3	9	982	1027	−45	.250	Qualified for the First round
12	Hapoel Haifa	12	3	9	966	1116	−150	.250	Qualified for the First round
13	Hapoel Be'er Sheva	12	2	10	985	1075	−90	.167	Qualified for the First round

== First round ==
27 March	Bnei Herzliya	90–94	Hapoel Be'er Sheva	Herzliya
18:35	Scoring by quarter: 26–18, 16–20, 20–26, 28–30
	Pts: Bourdillon 23; Rebs: Bourdillon, Stone 5 Asts: McGuirl 6 PIR: Bourdillon 27	Boxscore	Pts: Lewis II 25; Rebs: Gant 13; Asts: Lewis II 6 PIR: Lewis II 27	Arena: HaYovel Hall

27 March	Hapoel Holon	90–73	Hapoel Haifa	Holon
18:50	Scoring by quarter: 16–13, 25–24, 24–17, 25–19
	Pts: Crawford 14; Rebs: Misgav 7 Asts: Harris 10; PIR: Smith 21	Boxscore	Pts: Rosenbaum 20; Rebs: Bingham Jr. 6 Asts: Hamilton 12; PIR: Hamilton 24	Arena: Holon Toto Hall

27 March	Hapoel Jerusalem	89–69	Hapoel Galil Elyon	Jerusalem
19:00	Scoring by quarter: 20–25, 19–17, 21–10, 29–16
	Pts: Smith 17; Rebs: Hankins 9 Asts: Smith 12; PIR: Hankins 30	Boxscore	Pts: Guy 16; Rebs: Amsalem 7 Asts: Huber 10; PIR: Huber, Guy 16	Arena: Pais Arena

27 March	Ironi Ness Ziona	88–79	Hapoel Afula	Ness Ziona
18:45	Scoring by quarter: 22–25, 24–21, 25–16, 17–17
	Pts: Meyinsse 18; Rebs: Segev 13; Asts: Whitehead 6 PIR: Segev 28	Boxscore	Pts: Earlington 15; Rebs: Weisz, Goldenberg 6 Asts: Shelton, Goldenberg 3 PIR: Shelton 16	Arena: Lev Hamoshava

27 March	Ironi Kiryat Ata	80–61	Hapoel Eilat	Kiryat Ata
18:40	Scoring by quarter: 21–15, 19–16, 24–19, 16–11
	Pts: Stevens 17; Rebs: Stevens, Adam 6 Asts: Adam 6 PIR: Stevens 16	Boxscore	Pts: Stewart 26; Rebs: Zabelin 10; Asts: Stewart 3 PIR: Stewart 24	Arena: Ramaz Hall

== Quarterfinals ==
30 March	Hapoel Holon	83–88	Hapoel Be'er Sheva	Holon
19:50	Scoring by quarter: 22–22, 22–25, 21–15, 18–26
	Pts: Harvey 22; Rebs: Smith 12; Asts: Misgav 8 PIR: Smith 24	Boxscore	Pts: Gant 23; Rebs: Gant, Williams 8 Asts: Lewis II, Sherfield 5 PIR: Gant 25	Arena: Holon Toto Hall

31 March	Ironi Kiryat Ata	84–80	Ironi Ness Ziona	Kiryat Ata
20:00	Scoring by quarter: 20–21, 22–18, 20–20, 22–21
	Pts: Stevens 33; Rebs: Stevens 10; Asts: Batemon 5 PIR: Stevens 39	Boxscore	Pts: Segev 15; Rebs: Segev 16; Asts: Whitehead 7 PIR: Segev 24	Arena: Ramaz Hall

31 March	Hapoel Jerusalem	84–79	Hapoel Tel Aviv	Jerusalem
18:00	Scoring by quarter: 15–19, 22–12, 27–21, 20–27
	Pts: Hankins 23; Rebs: Hankins 15; Asts: Randolph, Smith 5 PIR: Hankins 40	Boxscore	Pts: Alexander 17; Rebs: Alexander 12; Asts: Angola 4 PIR: Alexander 29	Arena: Pais Arena

1 April	Maccabi Tel Aviv	104–72	Maccabi Ironi Ramat Gan	Tel Aviv
20:30	Scoring by quarter: 19–16, 25–19, 27–23, 33–14
	Pts: Baldwin 17; Rebs: Rivero 6 Asts: Brown 6 PIR: Rivero 21	Boxscore	Pts: Miles 19; Rebs: Mathiang 10; Asts: McCullum 7 PIR: Miles 17	Arena: Menora Mivtachim Arena

== Semi Finals ==
10 May	Ironi Kiryat Ata	67–102	Maccabi Tel Aviv	Tel Aviv
14:00	Scoring by quarter: 27–18, 11–30, 10–30, 19–24
	Pts: Stevens 27; Rebs: Stevens 11; Asts: Batemon 7 PIR: Stevens 25	Boxscore	Pts: Sorkin 17; Rebs: Sorkin 9 Asts: Brown, Blatt 6 PIR: Sorkin 28	Arena: Menora Mivtachim Arena

9 May	Hapoel Be'er Sheva	69–74	Hapoel Jerusalem	Tel Aviv
20:00	Scoring by quarter: 11–21, 26–20, 13–21, 19–12
	Pts: Sherfield, Gant 16; Rebs: Bankston, Gant 6 Asts: Segal 5 PIR: Bankston 21	Boxscore	Pts: Carrington 16; Rebs: Williams 8 Asts: Dovrat 7 PIR: Three players 15	Arena: Menora Mivtachim Arena

== Final ==
16 May	Hapoel Jerusalem	85–72	Maccabi Tel Aviv	Tel Aviv
21:00	Scoring by quarter: 16–23, 21–23, 31–10, 17–16
	Pts: Williams 21; Rebs: Levi 9 Asts: Smith 15; PIR: Smith 24	Boxscore	Pts: Sorkin 17; Rebs: Nebo 13; Asts: Brown, Blatt 7 PIR: Sorkin, Nebo 22	Arena: Menora Mivtachim Arena

Starters:			Pts	Reb	Ast
PF	22	(United States) JaCorey Williams	21	6	0
G/F	20	(United States) Levi Randolph	17	4	2
PG	44	(United States) Speedy Smith	12	5	15
PF	15	(Israel) Nimrod Levi	10	9	2
G/F	50	(Israel) Yovel Zoosman	9	6	1
Reserves:					
G	3	(United States) Khadeen Carrington	16	1	2
SF	4	(United States) Chris Johnson	0	3	0
C	7	(Israel) Alex Tyus	0	0	0
G	14	(Israel) Noam Dovrat	0	0	0
G/F	80	(Israel) Or Cornelius	0	0	0
SG	23	(Israel) Afek Amsalem	DNP		
F	24	(Israel) Oz Blayzer	DNP		
Head coach:
(Israel) Yonatan Alon

H. Jerusalem	M. Tel Aviv

H. Jerusalem	Statistics	M. Tel Aviv
27/51 (52.9%)	2 point field goals	21/35 (60.0%)
8/30 (26.7%)	3 point field goals	6/23 (26.1%)
7/14 (50.0%)	Free throws	12/17 (70.6%)
38	Rebounds	41
22	Assists	18
10	Steals	5
8	Turnovers	22
1	Blocks	2

Starters:			Pts	Reb	Ast
F	50	(United States) Bonzie Colson	10	4	0
C	32	(United States) Josh Nebo	9	13	1
G	4	(United States) Lorenzo Brown	9	1	7
G	12	(Israel) John DiBartolomeo	4	5	2
F/C	15	(Israel) Jake Cohen	0	0	0
Reserves:					
F/C	9	(Israel) Roman Sorkin	17	6	0
F/C	14	(Cuba) Jasiel Rivero	8	3	0
PG	45	(Israel) Tamir Blatt	8	2	7
G/F	1	(United States) Antonius Cleveland	7	1	1
SF	8	(Israel) Rafi Menco	0	1	0
G	17	(Israel) Omer Mayer	DNP		
G	19	(Israel) Yaron Goldman	DNP		
Head coach:
(Israel) Oded Kattash

2024 Israeli State Cup Winners
Hapoel Jerusalem
(8th title)
