= 2023 Israeli Basketball League Cup =

Israeli basketball pre-season tournament

Tournament details
- Country: Israel
- Venue: Tel Aviv
- Dates: 14 September–1 October 2023
- Teams: 12
- Defending champions: Maccabi Tel Aviv

Final positions
- Champions: Hapoel Jerusalem
- Runners-up: Maccabi Tel Aviv
- Semifinalists: Hapoel Holon; Hapoel Tel Aviv

Tournament statistics
- Matches played: 11

Awards
- MVP: (United States) Speedy Smith
- All statistics correct as of 1 October 2023.

The 2023 Israeli Basketball League Cup, for sponsorships reasons the Winner League Cup, was the 18th edition of the pre-season tournament of the Israeli Basketball Premier League. Twelve Israeli Premier League team's participate except from Ironi Ness Ziona that played in the Basketball Champions League Qualification in those days.

== Bracket ==
First round 14–19 September
14 September, 19:00
Hapoel Haifa	85
Ironi Kiryat Ata	93
14 September, 19:15
Bnei Herzliya	84
Maccabi Ironi Ramat Gan	93
19 September, 19:00
Hapoel Be'er Sheva	93
Hapoel Eilat	76
18 September, 20:10
Hapoel Galil Elyon	78
Hapoel Afula	82

Quarterfinals; 21–26 September
26 September, 17:30
Maccabi Tel Aviv	95
Ironi Kiryat Ata	71
22 September, 15:00
Hapoel Tel Aviv	88
Maccabi Ironi Ramat Gan	83
23 September, 21:00
Hapoel Jerusalem	78
Hapoel Be'er Sheva	62
21 September, 21:15
Hapoel Holon	79
Hapoel Afula	64

Semifinals; 27–28 September
28 September, 21:00
Maccabi Tel Aviv	20
Hapoel Tel Aviv	0
27 September, 21:15
Hapoel Jerusalem	97
Hapoel Holon	75

Final; 1 October
1 October, 21:00
Maccabi Tel Aviv	71
Hapoel Jerusalem	79

== First round ==
18 September	Hapoel Galil Elyon	78–82	Hapoel Afula	Kfar Blum
20:10	Scoring by quarter: 22–21, 20–22, 20–21, 16–18
	Pts: Huber 17; Rebs: Sanford 8 Asts: Huber 9 PIR: Huber 14	Boxscore	Pts: De Lattibeaudiere 21; Rebs: De Lattibeaudiere 12; Asts: Weisz 4 PIR: De Lattibeaudiere 32	Arena: HaPais Kfar Blum; Attendance: 800

19 September	Hapoel Be'er Sheva	93–76	Hapoel Eilat	Be'er Sheva
19:00	Scoring by quarter: 25–25, 19–16, 28–20, 21–15
	Pts: Levy 17; Rebs: Levy 13; Asts: Segal 5 PIR: Levy 31	Boxscore	Pts: McGee & Stewart 17; Rebs: Kyser 6 Asts: Chealey 9 PIR: Chealey 27	Arena: Conch Arena; Attendance: 455

14 September	Bnei Herzliya	84–93	Maccabi Ironi Ramat Gan	Herzliya
19:15	Scoring by quarter: 28–20, 20–19, 25–32, 11–20
	Pts: Simon 21; Rebs: Simon 9 Asts: Cohen 4 PIR: Simon 27	Boxscore	Pts: McCullum 22; Rebs: Alston 9 Asts: McCullum 11; PIR: McCullum 26	Arena: HaYovel Herzliya; Attendance: 850

14 September	Hapoel Haifa	85–93	Ironi Kiryat Ata	Haifa
19:00	Scoring by quarter: 15–23, 21–20, 25–25, 24–25
	Pts: Bingham 24; Rebs: Bingham 12; Asts: Stark 5 PIR: Bingham 35	Boxscore	Pts: Batemon 20; Rebs: Stevens 11; Asts: Four players 3 PIR: Stevens 27	Arena: Romema Arena; Attendance: 800

== Quarterfinals ==
21 September	Hapoel Holon	79–64	Hapoel Afula	Tel Aviv
21:15	Scoring by quarter: 22–22, 18–24, 15–11, 24–7
	Pts: Dawson 19; Rebs: Smith 7 Asts: Caver 7 PIR: Dawson 21	Boxscore	Pts: Shepherd 25; Rebs: Shepherd 7 Asts: Asayag 4 PIR: Shepherd 16	Arena: Drive in Arena; Attendance: 1,000

23 September	Hapoel Jerusalem	78–62	Hapoel Be'er Sheva	Tel Aviv
21:00	Scoring by quarter: 20–13, 20–10, 15–21, 23–18
	Pts: Hankins 20; Rebs: Hankins 10; Asts: Smith 5 PIR: Hankins 23	Boxscore	Pts: Sampson 15; Rebs: Gant 7 Asts: Paretsky 5 PIR: Sampson 18	Arena: Drive in Arena; Attendance: 650

22 September	Hapoel Tel Aviv	88–83	Maccabi Ironi Ramat Gan	Tel Aviv
15:00	Scoring by quarter: 20–18, 26–14, 20–30, 22–21
	Pts: Hoard 23; Rebs: Ginat 9 Asts: Timor & Zalmanson 6 PIR: Hoard 30	Boxscore	Pts: McCullum 20; Rebs: Alston 7 Asts: Tokoto 5 PIR: McCullum 26	Arena: Drive in Arena; Attendance: 2,500

26 September	Maccabi Tel Aviv	95–71	Ironi Kiryat Ata	Tel Aviv
17:30	Scoring by quarter: 22–14, 18–21, 30–23, 25–13
	Pts: Nebo 16; Rebs: Webb & Nebo 7 Asts: Baldwin & Blatt 6 PIR: Nebo 25	Boxscore	Pts: Batemon 13; Rebs: Stevens 6 Asts: Adam 4 PIR: Adam 15	Arena: Drive in Arena; Attendance: 900

== Semifinals ==
27 September	Hapoel Jerusalem	97–75	Hapoel Holon	Tel Aviv
21:15	Scoring by quarter: 21–13, 26–19, 18–18, 32–25
	Pts: Randolph 23; Rebs: Chachashvili & Hankins 5 Asts: Lemar 6 PIR: Randolph 25	Boxscore	Pts: Noua 16; Rebs: Smith 6 Asts: Caver & Misgav 5 PIR: Noua 22	Arena: Drive in Arena; Attendance: 2,150

28 September	Maccabi Tel Aviv	20–0	Hapoel Tel Aviv	Tel Aviv
21:00
		Boxscore		Arena: Drive in Arena
Note: Hapoel Tel Aviv announced that it will not go up to play in light of the police conduct, who prevented the entry of the team's fans, including minors who arrived without ID. After Hapoel Tel Aviv did not show up, the judges ruled a technical victory for Maccabi Tel Aviv.

== Final ==
1 October	Maccabi Tel Aviv	71–79	Hapoel Jerusalem	Tel Aviv
21:00	Scoring by quarter: 20–20, 23–15, 8–21, 20–23
	Pts: Brown 16; Rebs: Brown 5 Asts: Blatt 6 PIR: DiBartolomeo 17	Boxscore	Pts: Smith 21; Rebs: Hankins 9 Asts: Three players 3 PIR: Hankins 21	Arena: Drive in Arena; Attendance: 3,300

Starters:			Pts	Reb	Ast
G	4	(United States) Lorenzo Brown	16	5	5
F/C	15	(Israel) Jake Cohen	4	2	0
C	32	(United States) Josh Nebo	6	4	0
PG	45	(Israel) Tamir Blatt	4	3	6
F	50	(United States) Bonzie Colson	13	2	0
Reserves:					
SF	8	(Israel) Rafi Menco	7	3	2
F/C	9	(Israel) Roman Sorkin	4	4	0
G	12	(Israel) John DiBartolomeo	13	4	1
F/C	14	(Cuba) Jasiel Rivero	4	0	3
G	17	(Israel) Omer Mayer	0	0	0
Head coach:
(Israel) Oded Kattash

M. Tel Aviv	H. Jerusalem

M. Tel Aviv	Statistics	H. Jerusalem
22/39 (56%)	2 point field goals	23/46 (50%)
5/24 (21%)	3 point field goals	7/20 (35%)
12/18 (67%)	Free throws	12/17 (71%)
33	Rebounds	41
17	Assists	15
4	Steals	8
10	Turnovers	12
4	Blocks	1

Starters:			Pts	Reb	Ast
G/F	20	(United States) Levi Randolph	17	3	3
F	24	(Israel) Oz Blayzer	6	6	2
C	35	(United States) Zach Hankins	13	9	3
PG	44	(United States) Speedy Smith	21	3	2
G/F	80	(Israel) Or Cornelius	0	1	0
Reserves:					
SF	4	(United States) Chris Johnson	3	0	0
G	11	(United States) Brynton Lemar	2	2	3
C	33	(Israel) Gabriel Chachashvili	7	3	0
G/F	50	(Israel) Yovel Zoosman	10	7	2
Head coach:
(Serbia) Aleksandar Džikić

2023 League Cup Winners
Hapoel Jerusalem
6^{th} title
