= 2023–24 Premier League (disambiguation) =

The 2023–24 Premier League was the professional association football league season in England.

2023–24 Premier League may also refer to:

== Association football ==
- 2023–24 Armenian Premier League
- 2023–24 Azerbaijan Premier League
- 2023–24 Bahraini Premier League
- 2023–24 Bangladesh Premier League
- 2023–24 Premier League of Bosnia and Herzegovina
- 2023–24 Cambodian Premier League
- 2023–24 Egyptian Premier League
- 2023–24 Ethiopian Premier League
- 2023–24 Ghana Premier League
- 2023–24 Hong Kong Premier League
- 2023–24 Iraqi Premier League
- 2023–24 Israeli Premier League
- 2023–24 Kenyan Premier League
- 2023–24 Kerala Premier League
- 2023–24 Kuwaiti Premier League
- 2023–24 Lebanese Premier League
- 2023–24 Maltese Premier League
- 2023–24 Namibia Premier League
- 2023–24 Russian Premier League
- 2023–24 Scottish Women's Premier League
- 2023–24 Syrian Premier League
- 2023–24 Ukrainian Premier League
- 2023–24 Welsh Premier League

== Basketball ==
- 2023–24 Favbet Premijer liga
- 2023–24 Israeli Basketball Premier League

== Cricket ==
- 2023–24 Bangladesh Premier League

== Volleyball ==
- 2024–25 Premier Volleyball League season (Philippines)
