= 2023–24 Israeli Basketball Premier League =

70th season of the Israeli Basketball Premier League

Israeli Basketball Premier League
- Season: 2023–24
- Dates: 6 October 2023 – 17 June 2024
- Teams: 13
- TV partner(s): Sports Channel

Regular season
- Season MVP: (Israel) Roman Sorkin
- Relegated: Hapoel Eilat

Finals
- Champions: Maccabi Tel Aviv
- Runners-up: Hapoel Tel Aviv
- Semifinalists: Hapoel Jerusalem; Ironi Kiryat Ata
- Finals MVP: (Israel) Roman Sorkin

Awards
- Israeli MVP: (Israel) Roman Sorkin
- Rising Star: (Israel) Ben Saraf
- Best Defender: (Israel) Guy Palatin
- Most Improved: (Israel) Shahar Amir
- Sixth Man: (Israel) Jordan Cohen
- Coach of the Year: (Israel) Sharon Avrahami

Statistical leaders
Points	(United States) Elijah Stewart	20.6
Rebounds	(Israel) Itay Segev	8.6
Assists	(United States) Speedy Smith	7.6

The 2023–24 Israeli Basketball Premier League, for sponsorship reasons Ligat Winner, was the 70th season of the Israeli Basketball Premier League. The season started on 6 October 2023.

== Format ==
The regular season will be played in a 26-round round-robin format. The top 6 finishers will play the 5 rounds "upper house", with the other 7 teams playing the 7 rounds "bottom house". The 6 upper group teams, joined by the top 2 teams from the bottom group, will play the quarter finals as Best-of-5 series. The semifinals and finals will be played as Best-of-3 series.

== Teams ==
Teams of the 2023–24 Israeli Basketball Premier League

Hapoel Gilboa Galil has been relegated to 2023–24 National League after placing in the bottom place of the 2022–23 Premier League. Hapoel Afula and Maccabi Ironi Ramat Gan have been promoted to the league after qualifying for the 2022–23 National League final.

=== Stadia and locations ===
Team	Home city	Stadium	Capacity
Bnei Herzliya	Herzliya	HaYovel Herzliya	1,500
Hapoel Afula	Afula	Nir Ha'emak Hall	1,000
Hapoel Be'er Sheva	Be'er Sheva	Conch Arena	3,000
Hapoel Eilat	Eilat	Begin Arena	1,200
Hapoel Galil Elyon	Upper Galilee and Kiryat Shmona	HaPais Kfar Blum	2,000
Hapoel Haifa	Haifa	Romema Arena	5,000
Hapoel Holon	Holon	Holon Toto Hall	5,500
Hapoel Jerusalem	Jerusalem	Pais Arena	11,000
Hapoel Tel Aviv	Tel Aviv	Drive in Arena	3,504
Ironi Kiryat Ata	Kiryat Ata	Ramaz Hall	1,200
Ironi Ness Ziona	Ness Ziona	Lev Hamoshava	1,300
Maccabi Ironi Ramat Gan	Ramat Gan	Zisman Hall	1,500
Maccabi Tel Aviv	Tel Aviv	Menora Mivtachim Arena	10,383

=== Personnel and sponsorship ===
Team	Chairman	Head coach	Team captain	Kit manufacturer	Main sponsor
Bnei Herzliya	(Israel) Eldad Akunis	(Israel) Dan Shamir	(United States) Chris Babb	Peak	Ofek Dist
Hapoel Afula	(Israel) Yossi Malka	(Israel) Roee Perl	(Argentina) (Israel) Lucas Goldenberg	Reebok	
Hapoel Be'er Sheva	(Israel) Kfir Arazi	(Israel) Oren Aharoni	(Israel) Neta Segal	Kempa	Altshuler Shacham
Hapoel Eilat	(Israel) Tal Pinhas	(Slovenia) Jurica Golemac	(United States) Tyrus McGee	Nike	Yossi Avrahami
Hapoel Galil Elyon	(Israel) Tamir Abrahams	(Israel) Barak Peleg	(Israel) Roi Huber	Peak	Nofar Energy
Hapoel Haifa	(Israel) Yuval Rosman	(Israel) Guy Goodes	(Israel) Ofek Avital	Reebok	Shoval engineering
Hapoel Holon	(Israel) Eitan Lanciano	(Israel) Amit Schaerf	(Israel) Niv Misgav	Reebok	Atsmon PlayGrounds
Hapoel Jerusalem	(Israel) Matan Edelson		(United States) Levi Randolph	Nike	Bank Yahav
Hapoel Tel Aviv	(Israel) Rami Cohen	(Greece) Stefanos Dedas	(Israel) Bar Timor	Reebok	Vegan Friendly
Ironi Kiryat Ata	(Israel) Naftali Ben Tov	(Israel) Sharon Avrahami	(United States) Amin Stevens	Reebok	Tax:on
Ironi Ness Ziona	(Israel) Yaniv Mizrahi	(Israel) Elad Hasin	(United States) Jerome Meyinsse	Reebok	Chai Motors
Maccabi Ironi Ramat Gan	(Israel) Chen Shnaiderman	(Israel) Shmulik Brenner	(Israel) Adam Ariel	Peak	
Maccabi Tel Aviv	(Israel) Shimon Mizrahi	(Israel) Oded Kattash	(United States) (Israel) John DiBartolomeo	Puma	Playtika

=== Managerial changes ===
Team	Outgoing manager	Manner of departure	Date of vacancy	Position in table	Replaced with	Date of appointment	Ref.
Hapoel Be'er Sheva	(Israel) Lior Lubin	Resigned	12 November 2023		(Israel) Yoav Shamir	12 November 2023	
Hapoel Haifa	(Israel) Oren Aharoni	Resigned	8 December 2023		(Israel) Guy Goodes	10 December 2023	
Hapoel Jerusalem	(Serbia) Aleksandar Džikić	Mutual consent	4 January 2024		(Greece) Ilias Kantzouris	10 January 2024	
Hapoel Eilat	(Italy) Massimiliano Menetti	Mutual consent	21 January 2024		(Slovenia) Jurica Golemac	7 February 2024	
Hapoel Be'er Sheva	(Israel) Yoav Shamir	Mutual consent	20 February 2024		(Israel) Oren Aharoni	20 February 2024	
Hapoel Jerusalem	(Greece) Ilias Kantzouris	Fired	20 March 2024				
Hapoel Tel Aviv	(Israel) Danny Franco	Fired	1 April 2024		(Greece) Stefanos Dedas	17 April 2024	

== Regular season ==
Pos	Team	Pld	W	L	PF	PA	PD	PCT	Qualification or relegation
1	Maccabi Tel Aviv	24	21	3	2202	1899	+303	.875	Advance to the Top-teams League Group
2	Hapoel Tel Aviv	24	18	6	2251	1971	+280	.750	Advance to the Top-teams League Group
3	Maccabi Ironi Ramat Gan	24	18	6	2039	1928	+111	.750	Advance to the Top-teams League Group
4	Hapoel Jerusalem	24	14	10	1967	1929	+38	.583	Advance to the Top-teams League Group
5	Hapoel Holon	24	13	11	1966	1904	+62	.542	Advance to the Top-teams League Group
6	Ironi Kiryat Ata	24	12	12	1987	2030	−43	.500	Advance to the Top-teams League Group
7	Bnei Herzliya	24	11	13	1971	2004	−33	.458	Advance to the Bottom-Teams League Group
8	Hapoel Haifa	24	11	13	1982	2139	−157	.458	Advance to the Bottom-Teams League Group
9	Hapoel Afula	24	10	14	1947	1939	+8	.417	Advance to the Bottom-Teams League Group
10	Ironi Ness Ziona	24	9	15	1962	2017	−55	.375	Advance to the Bottom-Teams League Group
11	Hapoel Eilat	24	7	17	1830	2029	−199	.292	Advance to the Bottom-Teams League Group
12	Hapoel Galil Elyon	24	6	18	1961	2138	−177	.250	Advance to the Bottom-Teams League Group
13	Hapoel Be'er Sheva	24	6	18	1984	2122	−138	.250	Advance to the Bottom-Teams League Group

Rules for classification:

=== Rounds 1 to 26 ===
Home \ Away	MTA	HTA	MRG	HJE	HHO	IKA	BNH	HHA	HAF	INZ	HEI	HGE	HBS
Maccabi Tel Aviv		95–78	92–75	90–78	91–82	78–86	98–85	96–104	95–78	86–82	90–77	89–81	90–77
Hapoel Tel Aviv	89–86		81–94	109–100	90–78	87–91	99–80	87–88	93–81	97–94	112–76	90–66	90–68
Maccabi Ironi Ramat Gan	71–88	80–93		79–73	76–65	94–89	87–82	80–77	71–63	104–82	75–69	89–77	86–78
Hapoel Jerusalem	85–90	64–91	82–93		72–73	97–83	81–65	88–68	81–78	76–70	103–85	81–73	77–71
Hapoel Holon	84–86	98–90	74–75	89–96		88–82	87–92	86–75	85–80	81–73	87–71	84–72	103–80
Ironi Kiryat Ata	72–91	89–97	71–94	76–74	86–82		74–87	100–72	90–73	101–96	83–70	81–95	92–72
Bnei Herzliya	74–94	80–82	70–80	80–85	75–72	76–62		96–98	81–75	68–99	93–96	80–66	87–78
Hapoel Haifa	73–108	84–103	74–81	85–78	71–84	92–93	90–101		88–82	82–111	81–71	71–88	93–87
Hapoel Afula	83–97	84–78	80–97	105–65	72–60	73–76	65–64	91–73		82–64	80–94	109–107	91–76
Ironi Ness Ziona	73–97	63–102	86–74	74–77	74–76	78–64	84–92	79–83	77–73		80–71	87–91	98–95
Hapoel Eilat	70–85	78–106	83–80	57–95	75–62	83–75	81–91	76–78	67–65	63–67		73–80	87–96
Hapoel Galil Elyon	67–103	76–112	101–108	71–80	71–92	83–93	104–99	76–83	79–94	92–95	69–72		80–87
Hapoel Be'er Sheva	75–87	78–95	98–96	74–79	79–94	98–78	67–73	97–99	81–90	90–76	96–85	86–96	

Legend: Blue = home team win; Red = away team win.
Matches with lighter background shading were decided after overtime.

== Top-teams League Group ==
Pos	Team	Pld	W	L	PF	PA	PD	PCT	Qualification or relegation	MTA	HTA	MRG	HJE	HHO	IKA
1	Maccabi Tel Aviv	29	25	4	2670	2310	+360	.862	Advance to the playoffs		88–82		103–71		117–95
2	Hapoel Tel Aviv	29	21	8	2663	2348	+315	.724	Advance to the playoffs			82–71		79–59	98–77
3	Maccabi Ironi Ramat Gan	29	18	11	2427	2348	+79	.621	Advance to the playoffs	81–84			79–93	83–84	
4	Hapoel Jerusalem	29	18	11	2391	2325	+66	.621	Advance to the playoffs		82–71			94–76	
5	Hapoel Holon	29	16	13	2357	2321	+36	.552	Advance to the playoffs	82–76					90–85
6	Ironi Kiryat Ata	29	13	16	2388	2493	−105	.448	Advance to the playoffs			77–74	67–84		

Rules for classification:

== Bottom-Teams League Group ==
Pos	Team	Pld	W	L	PF	PA	PD	PCT	Qualification or relegation	HHA	INZ	HAF	BNH	HGE	HBS	HEI
7	Hapoel Haifa	30	15	15	2481	2664	−183	.500	Advance to the playoffs			88–80			93–89	80–67
8	Ironi Ness Ziona	30	14	16	2465	2461	+4	.467	Advance to the playoffs	84–68					85–70	85–79
9	Hapoel Afula	30	12	18	2431	2435	−4	.400			84–75		68–65	82–85		
10	Bnei Herzliya	30	12	18	2449	2503	−54	.400		89–90	75–91			77–67		
11	Hapoel Galil Elyon	30	10	20	2469	2598	−129	.333		116–80	67–84				86–60	
12	Hapoel Be'er Sheva	30	9	21	2481	2646	−165	.300				90–87	88–82			100–91
13	Hapoel Eilat	30	9	21	2333	2553	−220	.300	Relegation to Liga Leumit			94–82	95–90	77–87		

Rules for classification:

== Playoffs ==
Quarterfinals; 28 May–2 June 2024
1	Maccabi Tel Aviv	109	99	105	3
8	Ironi Ness Ziona	83	66	64	0
4	Hapoel Jerusalem	93	70	93	3
5	Hapoel Holon	86	68	75	0
2	Hapoel Tel Aviv	97	100	83	3
7	Hapoel Haifa	66	91	65	0
3	Maccabi Ironi Ramat Gan	94	84	72	0
6	Ironi Kiryat Ata	95	94	74	3

Semifinals; 5–10 June 2024
1	Maccabi Tel Aviv	89	82	2
4	Hapoel Jerusalem	82	73	0
2	Hapoel Tel Aviv	79	70	100	2
6	Ironi Kiryat Ata	82	62	83	1

Finals; 13–17 June 2024
1	Maccabi Tel Aviv	84	67	82	2
2	Hapoel Tel Aviv	76	85	74	1

=== Quarterfinals ===
==== Game 1 ====
28 May 2024	Maccabi Tel Aviv	109–83 (Series: 1–0)	Ironi Ness Ziona	Tel Aviv
17:00	Scoring by quarter: 25–17, 36–19, 24–23, 24–24
	Pts: Brown 18; Rebs: Nebo 8 Asts: Brown 7 PIR: Brown 25	Boxscore	Pts: Whitehead 15; Rebs: Levinson 9 Asts: Alkins 5 PIR: Levinson 22	Arena: Menora Mivtachim Arena

28 May 2024	Hapoel Tel Aviv	97–66 (Series: 1–0)	Hapoel Haifa	Tel Aviv
19:05	Scoring by quarter: 25–15, 23–15, 22–18, 27–18
	Pts: Holland 27; Rebs: Hoard, Miles 7 Asts: Timor 8 PIR: Holland 31	Boxscore	Pts: Hamilton, Bingham 15; Rebs: Tucker, Bingham 5 Asts: Three players 5 PIR: Bingham 17	Arena: Drive in Arena

28 May 2024	Maccabi Ironi Ramat Gan	94–95 (Series: 0–1)	Ironi Kiryat Ata	Ramat Gan
21:00	Scoring by quarter: 27–22, 25–29, 21–25, 21–19
	Pts: Omot, Tokoto 17; Rebs: Mathiang 9 Asts: Tokoto 6 PIR: Tokoto 19	Boxscore	Pts: Stevens 26; Rebs: Pruitt 8 Asts: Stevens 8 PIR: Stevens 34	Arena: Zisman Hall

28 May 2024	Hapoel Jerusalem	93–86(OT) (Series: 1–0)	Hapoel Holon	Jerusalem
21:10	Scoring by quarter: 15–17, 24–16, 26–26, 16–22, Overtime: 12–5
	Pts: Randolph 30; Rebs: Randolph, Williams 6 Asts: Smith 10; PIR: Randolph 35	Boxscore	Pts: Smith 18; Rebs: Crawford 7 Asts: McCall 7 PIR: McCall 21	Arena: Pais Arena

==== Game 2 ====
31 May 2024	Ironi Ness Ziona	66–99 (Series: 0–2)	Maccabi Tel Aviv	Ness Ziona
15:45	Scoring by quarter: 13–20, 23–32, 16–27, 14–20
	Pts: Alkins 15; Rebs: Alkins, Meyinsse 9 Asts: Whitehead 5 PIR: Meyinsse 19	Boxscore	Pts: Sorkin 17; Rebs: Nebo 11; Asts: Brown 10; PIR: Brown 22	Arena: Lev Hamoshava

30 May 2024	Hapoel Haifa	91–100(OT) (Series: 0–2)	Hapoel Tel Aviv	Haifa
21:05	Scoring by quarter: 12–28, 23–21, 27–27, 27–13, Overtime: 2–11
	Pts: Hamilton 29; Rebs: Bingham 10; Asts: Hamilton 4 PIR: Hamilton 29	Boxscore	Pts: Munford 25; Rebs: Ginat 13; Asts: Ginat 7 PIR: Munford 27	Arena: Romema Arena

30 May 2024	Ironi Kiryat Ata	94–84(OT) (Series: 2–0)	Maccabi Ironi Ramat Gan	Kiryat Ata
19:00	Scoring by quarter: 22–21, 14–20, 20–10, 18–23, Overtime: 20–10
	Pts: Stevens 24; Rebs: Kaplan 10; Asts: Batemon 10; PIR: Stevens 32	Boxscore	Pts: Omot 18; Rebs: Tokoto 9 Asts: Tokoto 9 PIR: Omot 23	Arena: Ramaz Hall

31 May 2024	Hapoel Holon	68–70 (Series: 0–2)	Hapoel Jerusalem	Holon
13:45	Scoring by quarter: 17–17, 14–15, 17–22, 20–16
	Pts: Smith 30; Rebs: Smith 8 Asts: Artzi 3 PIR: Smith 37	Boxscore	Pts: Williams 19; Rebs: Williams 10; Asts: Zoosman 6 PIR: Williams 21	Arena: Holon Toto Hall

==== Game 3 ====
2 June 2024	Maccabi Tel Aviv	105–64 (Series: 3–0)	Ironi Ness Ziona	Tel Aviv
TBD	Scoring by quarter: 19–13, 37–15, 27–21, 22–15
	Pts: Menco, Sorkin 17; Rebs: Nebo, Colson 6 Asts: Brown 6 PIR: Cleveland 22	Boxscore	Pts: Meyinsse 20; Rebs: Meyinsse 9 Asts: Kravitz 5 PIR: Meyinsse 21	Arena: Menora Mivtachim Arena

2 June 2024	Hapoel Tel Aviv	83–65 (Series: 3–0)	Hapoel Haifa	Tel Aviv
TBD	Scoring by quarter: 17–19, 38–17, 15–15, 13–14
	Pts: Holland 20; Rebs: Zalmanson 7 Asts: Timor 6 PIR: Ennis 27	Boxscore	Pts: Lavy 17; Rebs: Tucker 11; Asts: Hamilton 6 PIR: Tucker 21	Arena: Drive in Arena

2 June 2024	Maccabi Ironi Ramat Gan	72–74(OT) (Series: 0–3)	Ironi Kiryat Ata	Ramat Gan
TBD	Scoring by quarter: 14–15, 17–11, 19–18, 15–21, Overtime: 7–9
	Pts: Cohen 23; Rebs: Mathiang 13; Asts: Cohen 4 PIR: Cohen 28	Boxscore	Pts: Batemon 23; Rebs: Stevens 12; Asts: Stevens 4 PIR: Batemon 25	Arena: Zisman Hall

2 June 2024	Hapoel Jerusalem	93–75 (Series: 3–0)	Hapoel Holon	Jerusalem
TBD	Scoring by quarter: 24–23, 28–19, 23–12, 18–21
	Pts: Johnson 16; Rebs: Williams 7 Asts: Smith 7 PIR: Johnson 24	Boxscore	Pts: Dawson, Hervey 18; Rebs: Hervey 6 Asts: Three players PIR: Hervey 23	Arena: Pais Arena

=== Semifinals ===
==== Game 1 ====
5 June 2024	Maccabi Tel Aviv	89–82 (Series: 1–0)	Hapoel Jerusalem	Tel Aviv
21:00	Scoring by quarter: 19–26, 25–22, 20–18, 25–16
	Pts: Three players Rebs: Colson 9 Asts: Blatt 11; PIR: Blatt 31	Boxscore	Pts: Carrington 24; Rebs: Johnson 6 Asts: Smith 6 PIR: Carrington 21	Arena: Menora Mivtachim Arena

6 June 2024	Hapoel Tel Aviv	79–82 (Series: 0–1)	Ironi Kiryat Ata	Tel Aviv
21:00	Scoring by quarter: 22–24, 18–20, 20–18, 19–20
	Pts: Ennis 22; Rebs: Hoard, Ginat 6 Asts: Ginat 5 PIR: Ennis 18	Boxscore	Pts: Stevens 23; Rebs: Kaplan 8 Asts: Batemon 4 PIR: Stevens 25	Arena: Drive in Arena

==== Game 2 ====
7 June 2024	Hapoel Jerusalem	73–82 (Series: 0–2)	Maccabi Tel Aviv	Jerusalem
14:45	Scoring by quarter: 14–21, 18–26, 24–12, 17–23
	Pts: Carrington, Zoosman 15; Rebs: Zoosman 8 Asts: Smith 10; PIR: Zoosman 22	Boxscore	Pts: Sorkin 20; Rebs: Sorkin 13; Asts: Blatt 7 PIR: Sorkin 32	Arena: Pais Arena

8 June 2024	Ironi Kiryat Ata	62–70 (Series: 1–1)	Hapoel Tel Aviv	Kiryat Ata
21:30	Scoring by quarter: 13–17, 21–17, 15–20, 13–16
	Pts: Stevens 16; Rebs: Stevens 10; Asts: Adam 4 PIR: Saraf 16	Boxscore	Pts: Ennis 17; Rebs: Hoard 13; Asts: Three players PIR: Ennis, Hoard 14	Arena: Ramaz Hall

==== Game 3 ====
10 June 2024	Hapoel Tel Aviv	100–83 (Series: 2–1)	Ironi Kiryat Ata	Tel Aviv
21:00	Scoring by quarter: 30–18, 19–17, 37–18, 14–30
	Pts: Ginat 22; Rebs: Ennis, Zalmanson 6 Asts: Zalmanson 5 PIR: Ginat 22	Boxscore	Pts: Stevens 25; Rebs: Stevens, Pruitt 6 Asts: Adam, Saraf 7 PIR: Stevens 27	Arena: Drive in Arena

=== Finals ===
13 June 2024 Game 1	Maccabi Tel Aviv	84–76 (Series: 1–0)	Hapoel Tel Aviv	Tel Aviv
21:00	Scoring by quarter: 25–26, 18–12, 17–22, 24–16
	Pts: Colson 18; Rebs: Nebo 9 Asts: Brown 8 PIR: Colson, Nebo 22	Boxscore	Pts: Munford 20; Rebs: Hoard 11; Asts: Ennis 6 PIR: Hoard 23	Arena: Menora Mivtachim Arena

15 June 2024 Game 2	Hapoel Tel Aviv	85–67 (Series: 1–1)	Maccabi Tel Aviv	Tel Aviv
21:15	Scoring by quarter: 29–17, 17–18, 17–14, 22–18
	Pts: Munford 25; Rebs: Hoard, Ginat 8 Asts: Ennis 7 PIR: Hoard 24	Boxscore	Pts: Sorkin 16; Rebs: DiBartolomeo 5 Asts: Blatt 9 PIR: Colson 16	Arena: Drive in Arena

17 June 2024 Game 3	Maccabi Tel Aviv	82–74 (Series: 2–1)	Hapoel Tel Aviv	Tel Aviv
21:30	Scoring by quarter: 21–24, 18–14, 15–17, 28–19
	Pts: Sorkin 19; Rebs: Sorkin 9 Asts: Blatt 6 PIR: Rivero 25	Boxscore	Pts: Ennis 17; Rebs: Alexander 7 Asts: Ennis 3 PIR: Ginat 20	Arena: Menora Mivtachim Arena

2023–24 Israeli Premier League champions
Maccabi Tel Aviv
57th title

== Awards ==
=== MVP of the Round ===
Round	Player	Team	EFF	Ref.
–
1	James Batemon (1/2)	Ironi Kiryat Ata	23	
2	Kevin Hervey	Hapoel Holon	28	
3	Netanel Artzi	Hapoel Holon	37	
4	Roman Sorkin	Maccabi Tel Aviv	24	
5	Jordan Cohen	Maccabi Ironi Ramat Gan	34	
6	Ethan Burg	Bnei Herzliya	24	
7	Marcus Carr	Bnei Herzliya	40	
8	Noam Avivi	Hapoel Afula	32	
9	Robert Carter	Bnei Herzliya	50	
10	JaKeenan Gant	Hapoel Be'er Sheva	36	
11	Bonzie Colson	Maccabi Tel Aviv	24	
12	Sacar Anim	Hapoel Eilat	45	
13	James Batemon (2/2)	Ironi Kiryat Ata	31	
14	Yair Kravitz (1/2)	Ironi Ness Ziona	33	
15	Mike McGuirl	Hapoel Haifa	28	
16	Xavier Munford	Hapoel Tel Aviv	19	
17	Amit Simhon	Hapoel Haifa	25	
18	Raz Adam (1/2)	Ironi Kiryat Ata	27	
19	Cassius Stanley	Hapoel Afula	39	
20	John DiBartolomeo	Maccabi Tel Aviv	23	
21	Bar Timor	Hapoel Tel Aviv	26	
22	Marcus Bingham (1/2)	Hapoel Haifa	25	
23	Yair Kravitz (2/2)	Ironi Ness Ziona	24	
24	Raz Adam (2/2)	Ironi Kiryat Ata	26	
25	James Feldeine	Hapoel Galil Elyon	27	
26	Nuni Omot	Maccabi Ironi Ramat Gan	30	
27	Marcus Bingham (2/2)	Hapoel Haifa	46	
28	Kris Bankston	Hapoel Be'er Sheva	40	
29	Rawle Alkins	Ironi Ness Ziona	26	
30	Alex Hamilton	Hapoel Haifa	35	
31	Isaiah Whitehead	Ironi Ness Ziona	35	
32	Gur Lavy	Hapoel Haifa	26	
33	Mike Lewis	Hapoel Be'er Sheva	24	

=== Monthly Awards ===
==== Player of the Month ====
Month	Player	Team	EFF	Ref.
December	(United States) Xavier Munford	Hapoel Tel Aviv	25.4	
January	(United States) James Batemon	Ironi Kiryat Ata	18.5	
February	(United States) Kevin Hervey	Hapoel Holon	23.7	
March	(United States) Kendale McCullum	Maccabi Ironi Ramat Gan	21.6	
April	(United States) Levi Randolph	Hapoel Jerusalem	12.6	

==== Israeli Player of the Month ====
Month	Player	Team	EFF	Ref.
December	(Israel) Lior Carreira	Hapoel Galil Elyon	20.3	
January	(Israel) Jordan Cohen	Maccabi Ironi Ramat Gan	16.2	
February	(Israel) Ethan Burg	Bnei Herzliya	20.2	
March	(Israel) John DiBartolomeo	Maccabi Tel Aviv	17.0	
April	(Israel) Roman Sorkin	Maccabi Tel Aviv	18.8	

==== Coach of the Month ====
Month	Coach	Team	W-L	Ref.
December	(Israel) Sharon Avrahami	Ironi Kiryat Ata	5–2	
January	(Israel) Danny Franco	Hapoel Tel Aviv	3–0	
February	(Israel) Oded Kattash	Maccabi Tel Aviv	7–0	
March	(Israel) Guy Goodes	Hapoel Haifa	3–0	
April	(Israel) Shmulik Brenner	Maccabi Ironi Ramat Gan	4–0	

=== Yearly awards ===
Award	Winner	Team	Ref.
Regular season MVP	(Israel) Roman Sorkin	Maccabi Tel Aviv	
Regular season Israeli MVP	(Israel) Roman Sorkin	Maccabi Tel Aviv	
Best Defender	(Israel) Guy Palatin	Ironi Kiryat Ata	
Sixth Man of the Year	(United States) (Israel) Jordan Cohen	Maccabi Ironi Ramat Gan	
Most Improved Player	(Israel) Shahar Amir	Hapoel Holon	
Rising Star	(Israel) Ben Saraf	Ironi Kiryat Ata	
First Team	(Israel) Roi Huber	Hapoel Galil Elyon	
First Team	(United States) Levi Randolph	Hapoel Jerusalem	
First Team	(Israel) Tomer Ginat	Hapoel Tel Aviv	
First Team	(Israel) Roman Sorkin	Maccabi Tel Aviv	
First Team	(United States) Amin Stevens	Ironi Kiryat Ata	
Second Team	(Israel) Tamir Blatt	Maccabi Tel Aviv	
Second Team	(United States) James Batemon	Ironi Kiryat Ata	
Second Team	(Israel) Adam Ariel	Maccabi Ironi Ramat Gan	
Second Team	(France) (United States) Jaylen Hoard	Hapoel Tel Aviv	
Second Team	(United States) Justin Smith	Hapoel Holon	
Coach of the Year	(Israel) Sharon Avrahami	Ironi Kiryat Ata	
Finals MVP	(Israel) Roman Sorkin	Maccabi Tel Aviv	

== Israeli clubs in European competitions ==
European-wide competitions
Competition	Team	Progress
EuroLeague	Maccabi Tel Aviv	Playoffs
Champions League	Hapoel Jerusalem	Round of 16
Champions League	Hapoel Holon	Round of 16
Champions League	Ironi Ness Ziona	Qualifying rounds
EuroCup	Hapoel Tel Aviv	Quarterfinals
FIBA Europe Cup	Hapoel Galil Elyon	Regular season
FIBA Europe Cup	Bnei Herzliya	Regular season
FIBA Europe Cup	Ironi Ness Ziona	Regular season

Regional leagues
Competition	Team	Progress
European North Basketball League	Hapoel Be'er Sheva	Regular season
