= Rewaldo Prins =

Namibian footballer

Personal information
- Date of birth: 25 February 2003 (age 23)
- Place of birth: Windhoek, Namibia
- Position: Midfielder

Team information
- Current team: Al-Afreeki
- Number: 17

Youth career
- –2022: Ramblers

Senior career*
Years	Team	Apps	(Gls)
2022–2023	United Africa Tigers	30	(2)
2023–2024	Khomas NAMPOL	26	(16)
2024–2025	Marumo Gallants	5	(0)
2025–	Al-Afreeki	8	(2)

International career^{‡}
2022	Namibia U20	3	(1)
- * Club domestic league appearances and goals as of 14:06, 26 May 2025 (UTC) ‡ National team caps and goals as of 14:37, 15 July 2024 (UTC)

Rewaldo Prins is a Namibian footballer who plays for Libyan Premier League club Al-Afreeki.

== Club career ==
As a youth, Prins played for Ramblers F.C. and was with the club through 2022. For the 2022–23 season, he joined Namibia Premiership club United Africa Tigers. That season, he tallied two goals and four assists.

Prins joined newly promoted Khomas NAMPOL, also of the Premiership, for the 2023–24 season. He scored twelve goals in his first twenty-four matches and was named the club's Player of the Month for April 2024. His twelve-goal tally was second in the league at that point, three behind Willy Stephanus with six matches remaining. Prins trailed Stephanus by two goals entering the final matchday. There was some controversy when the player scored two goals in the match against Life Fighters to draw level but was credited with only one tally. The dispute went to the league office for review. Eventually, Prins was recognized as the joint-top scorer with sixteen goals. The club was in the title race late in the season, but ultimately finished in third position.

Following his standout season with Khomas NAMPOL, Prins joined Marumo Gallants of the South African Premier Division on a two-year deal beginning in 2024–25.

== International career ==
At the youth level, Prins represented Namibia in the 2022 COSAFA U-20 Cup. He scored against Malawi in the team's final match of the Group Stage. In 2024, following his season with Khomas NAMPOL, Namibia head coach Collin Benjamin stated that as soon as Prins became stronger, he would be included in the senior squad.
