= Speedy Smith =

American basketball player (born 1993)

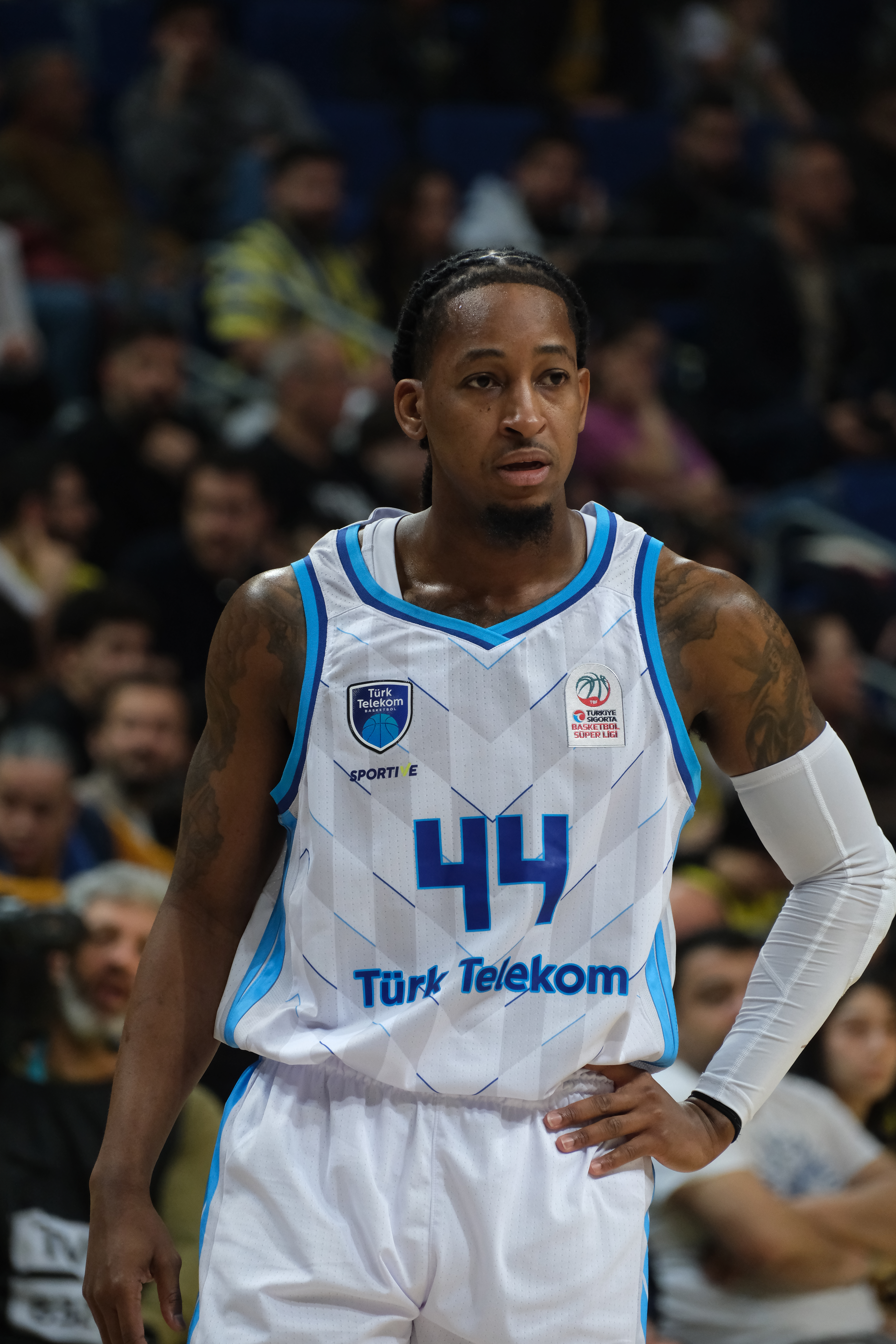
- Smith with Türk Telekom in 2025

No. 44 – Pallacanestro Reggiana
- Position: Point guard
- League: LBA

Personal information
- Born: January 28, 1993 (age 33) St. Petersburg, Florida, U.S.
- Listed height: 6 ft 3 in (1.91 m)
- Listed weight: 180 lb (82 kg)

Career information
- High school: Boca Ciega (Gulfport, Florida)
- College: Louisiana Tech (2011–2015)
- NBA draft: 2015: undrafted
- Playing career: 2015–present

Career history
- 2015: VEF Rīga
- 2016–2017: Los Angeles D-Fenders
- 2017–2019: Grand Rapids Drive
- 2019: Szolnoki Olaj
- 2019–2020: Spirou
- 2020: Maccabi Haifa
- 2020: Antwerp Giants
- 2020–2021: Limoges CSP
- 2021–2022: Rytas Vilnius
- 2022–2024: Hapoel Jerusalem
- 2024–2025: Türk Telekom
- 2025–2026: Merkezefendi Basket
- 2026: Rytas Vilnius
- 2026–present: Pallacanestro Reggiana

Career highlights
- FIBA Champions League champion (2026); Israeli League assists leader (2024); 2× Israeli State Cup winner (2023, 2024); 2× Israeli State Cup MVP (2023, 2024); Israeli League Cup winner (2023); Israeli League Cup MVP winner (2023); Lithuanian League champion (2022); C-USA Player of the Year (2015); 2× First-team All-C-USA (2014, 2015); 2× C-USA All-Defensive Team (2014, 2015); C-USA Defensive Player of the Year (2014); First-team All-WAC (2013); WAC All-Defensive Team (2013)
Medals
Men's basketball
Representing the United States
FIBA AmeriCup
Bronze medal – third place	2025 Managua

Kenneth Jerome "Speedy" Smith Jr. (born January 28, 1993) is an American professional basketball player for Pallacanestro Reggiana of the Italian Lega Basket Serie A (LBA). He was named Conference USA Men's Basketball Player of the Year in 2015.

== Early life ==
Smith was born and raised in St. Petersburg, Florida and attended Boca Ciega High School in Gulfport. He was given the nickname, Speedy, after his grandmother said, "That's Speedy" when he was born. Smith grew up as an athletics star and started out with football. Smith primarily played the quarterback position, his father saying, "I actually thought football was his better sport. He was a leader all the way through. He knew how to prepare his players and get them in the right position on the field." However, Smith later chose to start playing basketball because he felt that it would lower his chance of getting injured.

As a senior playing basketball for Boca Ciega, Smith averaged 18 points, 9.6 assists, 4 rebounds, 3 steals and 1.2 blocks per game.

== College career ==
Smith played four years of college basketball for Louisiana Tech. In 140 games, he averaged 6.2 points, 6.1 assists, 3.8 rebounds and 1.8 steals per game, earning C-USA Defensive Player of the Year honors as a junior and C-USA Player of the Year honors as a senior. As a senior in 2014–15, he tallied 7.4 assists (5th in the NCAA), 6.4 points, 4.0 rebounds and 1.9 steals, as he finished his career with 118 career starts (tied for the third most in program history) and finished as the school's career leader in total assists (858) and steals (258).

== Professional career ==
In June 2015, Smith had pre-draft workouts with the Dallas Mavericks, Phoenix Suns, Los Angeles Lakers, Portland Trail Blazers, Utah Jazz, Memphis Grizzlies, Boston Celtics and Detroit Pistons. However, he went through the workouts at less than 100 percent as he nursed an ankle injury suffered earlier that year. He had hopes of being a late second-round pick, but ultimately went undrafted in the 2015 NBA draft.

=== VEF Rīga (2015) ===
On August 11, 2015, Smith signed a two-year deal with VEF Rīga of the Latvian Basketball League. However, on November 24, he was released by Rīga after appearing in three league games and eight VTB United League games.

=== Los Angeles D-Fenders (2016–2017) ===
On January 6, 2016, Smith was acquired by the Los Angeles D-Fenders of the NBA Development League. He made his debut on January 9 in a 118–113 loss to the Canton Charge, recording three points, two rebounds and six assists in 13 minutes of action.

On October 30, Smith was reacquired by the Los Angeles D-Fenders.

=== Grand Rapids Drive (2017–2019) ===
On October 13, 2017, Smith was traded to the Grand Rapids Drive.

=== Szolnoki Olaj (2019) ===
On July 26, 2019, Smith signed with Szolnoki Olaj of the NB I/A.

=== Spirou Basket (2019–2020) ===
On December 19, 2019, he signed with Spirou Basket of the Belgian Pro Basketball League. The season was cancelled in March because of the COVID-19 pandemic.

=== Maccabi Haifa (2020) ===
On May 28, 2020, Smith signed with Maccabi Haifa of the Israeli Basketball Premier League for the remainder of the 2019-2020 season.

=== Antwerp Giants (2020) ===
On April 8, 2020, Antwerp Giants announced Smith as its first signing for the 2020–21 season.

=== Limoges CSP (2020–2021) ===
On December 12, 2020, Limoges CSP announced Smith as its new guard signing for the rest of the season in replacement of DeMarcus Nelson .

=== Rytas Vilnius (2021–2022) ===
On September 19, 2021, Smith signed with BC Rytas of the Lithuanian league. On June 7 Smith has won the LKL championship, winning the final series by beating Lietkabelis Panevėžys 4–1.

=== Hapoel Jerusalem (2022–2024) ===
On July 10, 2022, Smith signed with Hapoel Jerusalem of the Israeli Israeli Basketball Premier League. On November 5, 2024, Smith parted ways with the team. His request to be released from his contract was granted by the club.

=== Türk Telekom (2024–2025) ===
On November 7, 2024, he signed with Türk Telekom B.K. of the Basketbol Süper Ligi.

=== Merkezefendi Basket (2025–2026) ===
On September 25, 2025, he signed with Merkezefendi Belediyesi Denizli of the Basketbol Süper Ligi (BSL).

=== Return to Rytas (2026) ===
On January 1, 2026, Smith returned to Rytas Vilnius, signing for the remainder of the 2025–26 season. On May 9, 2026, he helped Rytas win their maiden Basketball Champions League title, recording 11 points, eight rebounds and eight assists in a 92–86 win over AEK Athens in the championship game.

=== Pallacanestro Reggiana (2026–present) ===
On July 24, 2026, Smith signed with Pallacanestro Reggiana of the Italian Lega Basket Serie A (LBA).

== Personal life ==
On November 15, 2005, at 2:06 AM, Smith's non-biological brother, Dalvontae Coley, was allegedly shot by two masked men that entered his apartment complex, which was located in St. Petersburg, Florida, at 22 years of age. Coley's death affected Smith considerably, as he often "looked up to his older brother." He said, "I always think about what if he was here right now."
