= James Batemon III =

American basketball player (born 1997)

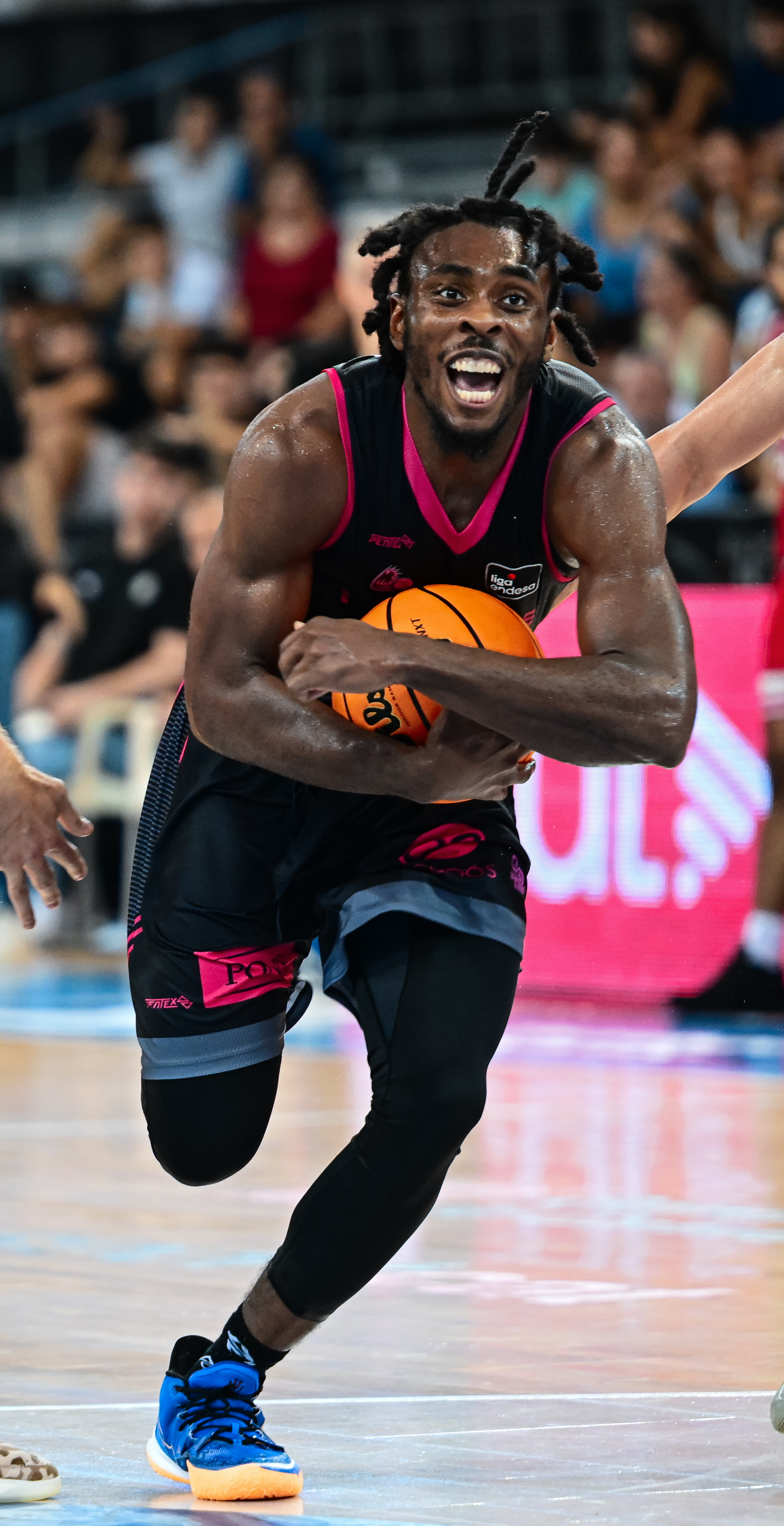
- Batemon with Força Lleida in 2025

No. 1 – Força Lleida
- Position: Point guard
- League: Liga ACB

Personal information
- Born: 8 April 1997 (age 29) Milwaukee, Wisconsin, U.S.
- Listed height: 6 ft 1 in (1.85 m)
- Listed weight: 189 lb (86 kg)

Career information
- High school: Riverside (Milwaukee, Wisconsin)
- College: NDSCS (2015–2017); Loyola Marymount (2017–2019)
- NBA draft: 2019: undrafted
- Playing career: 2019–present

Career history
- 2019–2020: Ogre
- 2020–2021: JA Vichy-Clermont
- 2021–2022: Tours Métropole
- 2022: Karditsa
- 2023: Crailsheim Merlins
- 2023–2024: Ironi Kiryat Ata
- 2024–2025: Brisbane Bullets
- 2025–present: Força Lleida

Career highlights
- All-Israeli League Second Team (2024); LNB Pro B Most Valuable Player (2022); First-team All-WCC (2019); Second-team All-WCC (2018)

James Batemon III (born April 8, 1997) is an American professional basketball player plays for Força Lleida of the Spanish Liga ACB. He played college basketball for North Dakota State College of Science and Loyola Marymount before playing professionally in Latvia, France, Greece, Germany, Israel, Australia and Spain. In 2022, he was named the LNB Pro B Most Valuable Player.

== High school career ==
Batemon attended Riverside University High School in Milwaukee, Wisconsin.

== College career ==
Batemon played two seasons of college basketball with North Dakota State College of Science from 2015 to 2017 before transferring to Loyola Marymount where he played until 2019. Batemon made an immediate impact on the program in his two seasons after transferring to LMU from an All-American career at North Dakota College of Science. As a junior, Batemon ranked fourth in the WCC in scoring, and led all newcomers to the conference, with a 17.8 ppg average in his All-WCC Second Team season and WCC All-Tournament Team. In his senior campaign, Batemon tied the program record by starting and playing all 34 games, finishing with the third-most minutes played in a season in school history at 1201. His senior year was filled with accolades after leading the West Coast Conference with 54 steals as he was named to the All-WCC First Team, Lou Henson Award Watch List, and Jamaica Classic Montego Bay Division MVP. Finished his career tied for 13th at 17.0 career ppg, 15th in career free throws made (323), 16th in career assists (261), and third in career minutes averaged (25.2).

== Professional career ==
After going undrafted at the 2019 NBA draft, Batemon started his pro career with Ogre of the Latvian-Estonian League. For the 2020–21 season, Batemon joined JA Vichy-Clermont of the LNB Pro B. The following season, he signed with Tours Métropole Basket. He was named the 2021–22 LNB Pro B Most Valuable Player.

On August 10, 2022, Batemon moved to ASK Karditsas of the Greek Basket League. On October 15, 2022, he scored a buzzer beater from half-court to give Karditsa a 59–57 win against Kolossos Rodou He left Karditsas in December 2022 and joined German club Crailsheim Merlins in January 2023.

For the 2023–24 season, Batemon joined Ironi Kiryat Ata of the Israeli Basketball Premier League.

On July 17, 2024, Batemon signed with the Brisbane Bullets of the Australian National Basketball League (NBL) for the 2024–25 season. On November 17, 2024, he scored 51 points and had nine 3-pointers in a 105–84 win over the Perth Wildcats. He became the second player to score 50 points in an NBL game since the league returned to 40-minute games and it was the most points by a Bullets player in a 40-minute game. On December 26, he was ruled out for the rest of the season with a hamstring injury. In 16 games, he averaged 15.5 points, 3.1 rebounds and 2.6 assists per game. He parted ways with the Bullets following the conclusion of the season.

In March 2025, Batemon joined Força Lleida of the Spanish Liga ACB. In 14 games to finish the 2024–25 ACB season, he averaged 16.2 points, 3.1 rebounds and 2.6 assists per game.

== Personal life ==
Batemon and his fiancé Nickayla have 2 sons.
