= Levi Randolph =

American basketball player (born 1992)

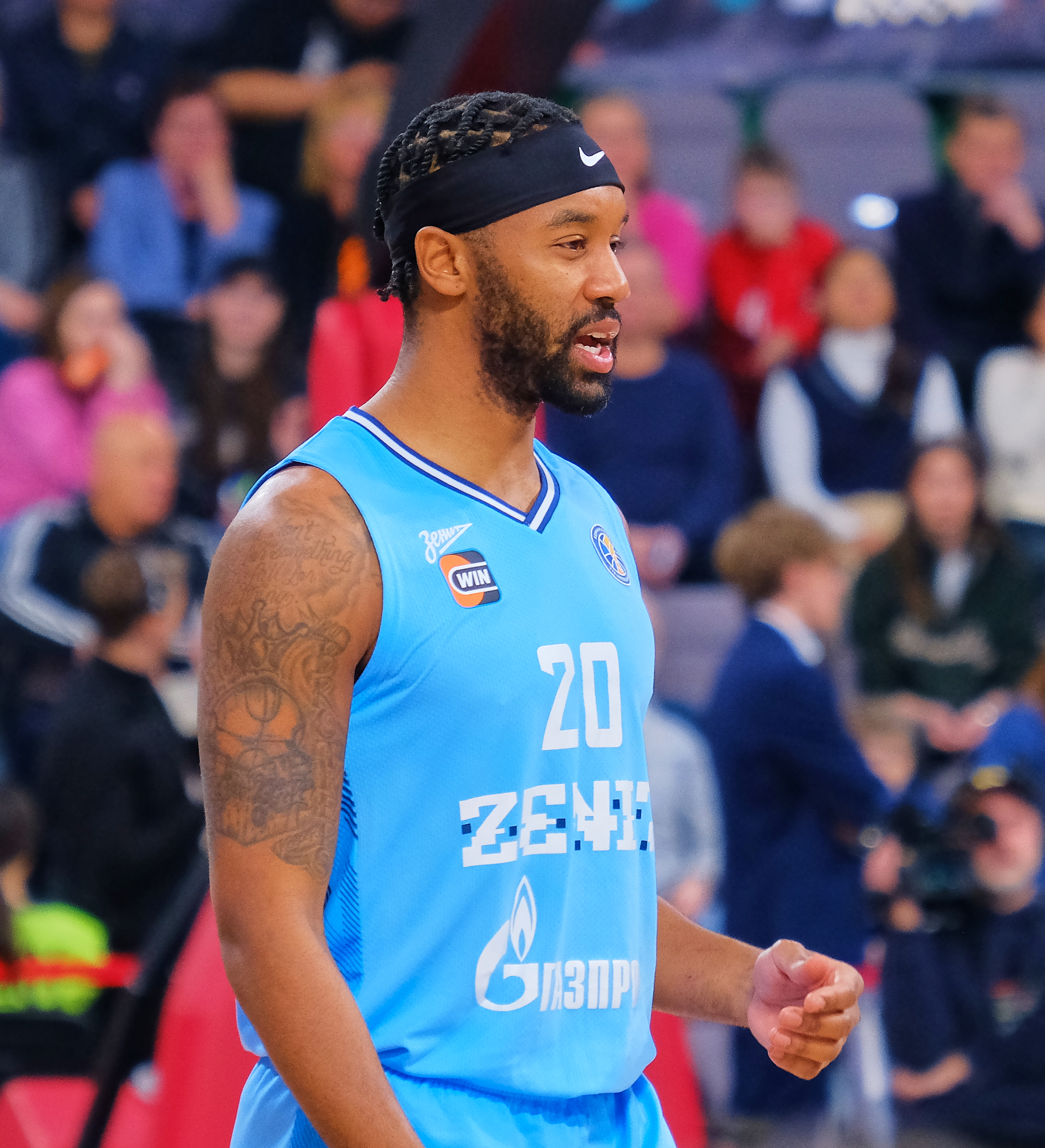
- Randolph with Zenit Saint Petersburg in 2025

Nagasaki Velca
- Position: Small forward / shooting guard

Personal information
- Born: October 3, 1992 (age 34) Madison, Alabama, U.S.
- Listed height: 6 ft 6 in (1.98 m)
- Listed weight: 210 lb (95 kg)

Career information
- High school: Bob Jones (Madison, Alabama)
- College: Alabama (2011–2015)
- NBA draft: 2015: undrafted
- Playing career: 2015–present

Career history
- 2015–2016: Maine Red Claws
- 2016–2017: Sidigas Avellino
- 2017–2018: Dinamo Sassari
- 2018: SIG Strasbourg
- 2018–2021: Canton Charge
- 2021: New Zealand Breakers
- 2021–2022: Oostende
- 2022–2024: Hapoel Jerusalem
- 2024–2025: Maccabi Tel Aviv
- 2025–2026: Zenit Saint Petersburg
- 2026: Hapoel Tel Aviv
- 2026–Present: Nagasaki Velca

Career highlights
- 2× All-FIBA Champions League Second Team (2023, 2024); FIBA Champions League Top Scorer (2022); FIBA Champions League All-Decade Second Team (2026); All-Israeli League First Team (2024); 3× Israeli Cup winner (2023–2025); 2× Israeli League Cup winner (2023, 2024); Belgian League champion (2022); BNXT League MVP (2022); All-BNXT League Team (2022); BNXT Supercup winner (2021); French Cup winner (2018); Second-team All-SEC (2015)
- Stats at Basketball Reference

Levi Leland Randolph Jr. (born October 3, 1992) is an American professional basketball player who plays for Nagasaki Velca of the B.League. He played college basketball for the Alabama Crimson Tide.

== High school career ==
Randolph attended Bob Jones High School. As a junior, he led his school to an upset win over No. 1 Homewood to win the 2009–10 AHSAA Class 6A Championship, earning several accolades in the process including 6A Player of the Year and state tournament MVP. In his senior year, Randolph averaged 19.5 points and 9.5 rebounds. Among his teammates at Bob Jones was Alabama linebacker Reggie Ragland. Before joining the Crimson Tide, Randolph was considered a four-star recruit by both ESPN.com and Rivals.com and was considered the 30th best player in the country by the latest.

== College career ==
As a four-year player in Alabama, Randolph played in 135 games with the Crimson Tide while starting 120, averaging 9.9 points, 4.28 rebounds, 1.8 assists and 1.11 steals. In his senior year he had a team-high average of 15.4 points, 2.5 assists and 1.4 steals while also averaging 5.1 rebounds. He was the first player of the program to be named to the CoSIDA/Capital One First Team Academic All-District Team for three consecutive years and was also named the 2015 SEC Scholar-Athlete of the Year and second team All-SEC.

== Professional career ==
=== Maine Red Claws (2015–2016) ===
After going undrafted in the 2015 NBA draft, Randolph played for the Oklahoma City Thunder in the Orlando Summer League and the Utah Jazz in the Las Vegas Summer League. He signed with the Boston Celtics on September 25, 2015, and was later waived on October 20 after appearing in two preseason games. On October 31, he was acquired by the Maine Red Claws of the NBA Development League as an affiliate player of the Celtics. He averaged 14.7 points, 4.8 rebounds, 2.8 assists and 1.0 steals in 52 games for the Red Claws during the 2015–16 season.

=== Sidigas Avellino (2016–2017) ===
In July 2016, Randolph played for the Philadelphia 76ers in the Utah Summer League and the Memphis Grizzlies in the Las Vegas Summer League. On August 2, 2016, he signed with Sidigas Avellino of the Italian Serie A. In 38 league games, he averaged 9.6 points and 3.1 rebounds per game. He also averaged 12.6 points, 3.6 rebounds, 1.4 assists and 1.1 steals in 16 BCL games.

=== Dinamo Sassari (2017–2018) ===
In July 2017, Randolph played for the Orlando Magic in the Orlando Summer League and the Minnesota Timberwolves in the Las Vegas Summer League. He returned to Italy for the 2017–18 season to play for Dinamo Sassari. He left the team in January 2018.

=== SIG Strasbourg (2018) ===
After leaving Dinamo Sassari, Randolph joined French team SIG Strasbourg.

=== Canton Charge (2018–2021) ===
In July 2018, Randolph played for the Indiana Pacers in Las Vegas Summer League. In September 2018, he joined the Cleveland Cavaliers for training camp and preseason. After being waived by the Cavaliers, he joined the Canton Charge of the NBA G League for the 2018–19 season. In 50 games, he averaged 14.6 points, 4.1 rebounds, 2.0 assists and 1.2 steals per game.

Randolph returned to the Cavaliers in August 2019, but after another short preseason stint, he re-joined the Charge. On January 6, 2020, he signed a two-way contract with the Cavaliers. He was waived a week later and returned to Canton. He led the team in scoring with 16.9 points per game to go with 5.3 rebounds and 3.3 assists per game.

In December 2020, Randolph had a third-straight preseason stint with the Cavaliers. He returned to the Charge in January 2021 for a third season.

=== New Zealand Breakers (2021) ===
On March 16, 2021, Randolph signed with the New Zealand Breakers for the rest of the 2020–21 NBL season. In 15 games, he averaged 14.8 points, 3.5 rebounds, 1.3 assists and 1.1 steals per game.

=== Filou Oostende (2021–2022) ===
On August 16, 2021, Randolph signed with Filou Oostende of the BNXT League and the Basketball Champions League.

On February 24, 2022, Randolph's NBA G League rights were traded from the Cleveland Charge to the Memphis Hustle in exchange for Cameron Young.

=== Hapoel Jerusalem (2022–2024) ===
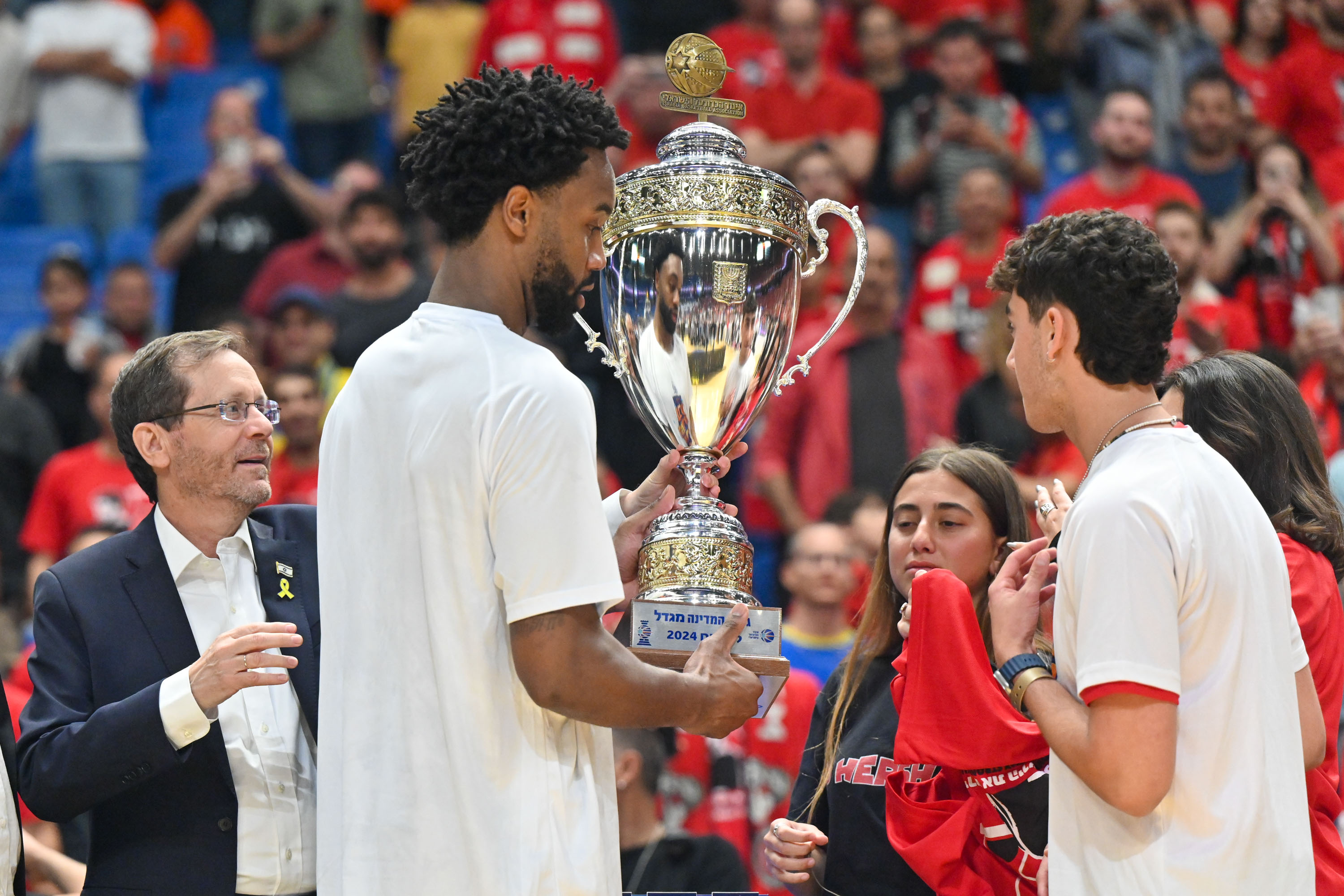
Randolph with Israeli President Isaac Herzog on May 16, 2024

On July 2, 2022, Randolph signed a one-year contract with Hapoel Jerusalem B.C of the Israeli Premier League and the Basketball Champions League.

=== Maccabi Tel Aviv (2024–2025) ===
In July 2024, Randolph signed a one-year contract with Maccabi Tel Aviv of the Israeli Premier League and the EuroLeague.

=== Zenit Saint Petersburg (2025–2026) ===
On July 24, 2025, Randolph signed a two-year contract with Zenit Saint Petersburg of the VTB United League.

=== Hapoel Tel Aviv (2026) ===
On February 23, 2026, Randolph signed for Hapoel Tel Aviv of the Israeli Premier League and the EuroLeague.

== Personal life ==
The son of Levi and Mia Randolph, he graduated in August 2014 with a degree in marketing. His brother is football player Kendall Randolph.

== Career statistics ==
Legend
GP	Games played	GS	Games started	MPG	Minutes per game
FG%	Field goal percentage	3P%	3-point field goal percentage	FT%	Free throw percentage
RPG	Rebounds per game	APG	Assists per game	SPG	Steals per game
BPG	Blocks per game	PPG	Points per game	**Bold**	Career high

=== College ===
Year	Team	GP	GS	MPG	FG%	3P%	FT%	RPG	APG	SPG	BPG	PPG
2011–12	Alabama	33	31	27.1	.385	.268	.590	3.9	1.7	1.0	.1	6.5
2012–13	Alabama	**36**	**34**	30.2	.431	.341	.716	4.2	1.6	1.1	**.2**	8.1
2013–14	Alabama	32	19	29.9	.420	.347	.705	3.8	1.4	.8	**.2**	9.6
2014–15	Alabama	34	**34**	**35.3**	**.481**	**.348**	**.839**	**5.1**	**2.5**	**1.5**	**.2**	**15.4**
Career		135	118	30.7	.436	.331	.747	4.3	1.8	1.1	.2	9.9
