= 2023–24 Namibia Premiership =

Namibia Premiership
- Season: 2023–24
- Dates: 16 September 2023 – 27 April 2024
- Champions: African Stars
- Matches: 240
- Top goalscorer: (Namibia) Willy Stephanus (Namibia) Rewaldo Prins (16 goals each)

The 2023–24 Namibia Premiership was the 2nd season of the Namibia Premiership, the top-tier football league in Namibia. African Stars won the championship for the second consecutive season. African Stars player Willy Stephanus and Rewaldo Prins of Khomas NAMPOL were the league's top scorers with sixteen goals each.

The new clubs promoted for the season were: Okakarara Young Warriors from the Northwest division, Eeshoke Chula Chula FC from the North East division, and Khomas NAMPOL FC from the Southern region. Tura Magic FC were renamed Ongos Valley FC prior to the start of the season.

Following the season, Orlando Pirates were relegated for the first time in club history. Life Fighters and newly-promoted Okakarara Young Warriors were also relegated.

NPFL teams 2023/24

== League table ==
Pos	Team	Pld	W	D	L	GF	GA	GD	Pts	Promotion, qualification or relegation
1	African Stars	30	19	7	4	57	20	+37	64	Champions
2	Ongos Valley	30	18	7	5	48	26	+22	61	
3	Khomas NAMPOL FC	30	18	5	7	16	39	−23	59	
4	UNAM	30	13	7	10	36	25	+11	46	
5	Eeshoke Chula Chula FC	30	12	10	8	36	27	+9	46	
6	Mighty Gunners	30	10	13	7	30	25	+5	43	
7	United Africa Tigers	30	11	10	9	30	29	+1	43	
8	Okahandja United	30	11	10	9	37	40	−3	43	
9	Blue Waters	30	10	10	10	32	31	+1	40	
10	Young African	30	9	11	10	24	28	−4	38	
11	Young Brazilians	30	10	5	15	35	53	−18	35	
12	Civics	30	6	12	12	22	32	−10	30	
13	Julinho Sporting	30	6	11	13	21	35	−14	29	
14	Okakarara Young Warriors	30	7	6	17	26	47	−21	27	Relegation to First Division
15	Orlando Pirates	30	6	8	16	21	43	−22	26	Relegation to First Division
16	Life Fighters	30	4	8	18	16	39	−23	20	Relegation to First Division

Updated to match(es) played on unknown. Source:

== Attendances ==
The African Stars and Eeshoke Chula Chula were the best-attended clubs.

#	Football club	Average attendance
1	African Stars	4,467
2	Eeshoke Chula Chula	4,344
3	Ongos SC	862
4	Khomas NAMPOL FC	714
5	UNAM FC	593
6	Okahandja United	474
7	Mighty Gunners	451
8	Tigers SC	296
9	Blue Waters	284
10	Young African	276
11	Orlando Pirates SC	243
12	Young Brazilians	216
13	FC Civics	198
14	Julinho Sporting	189
15	Okakarara Young Warriors	174
16	Life Fighters	162
