= Raz Adam =

Israeli basketball player (1999–2026)

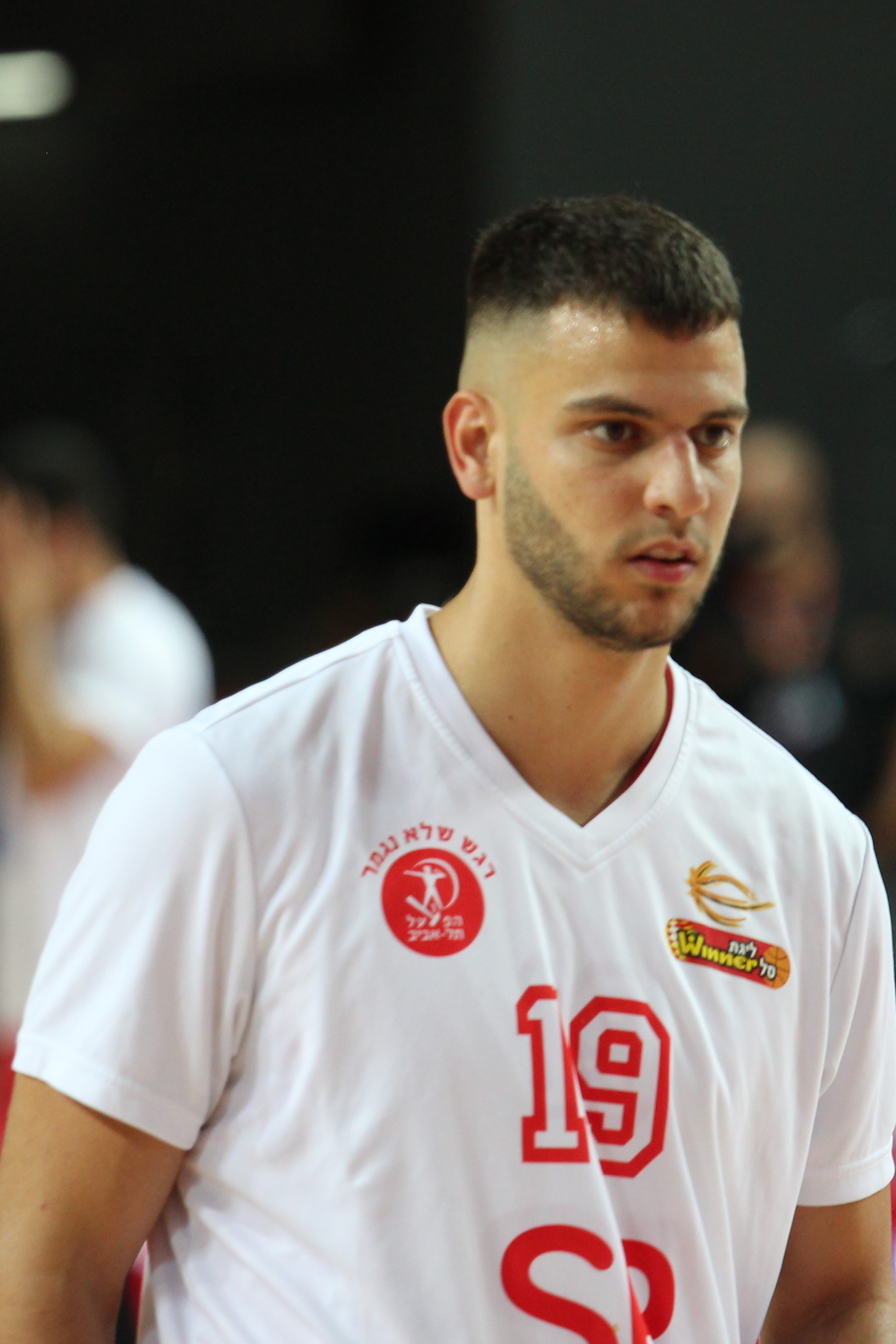
- Adam in 2020

Personal information
- Born: 20 October 1999 Netanya, Israel
- Died: 20 May 2026 (aged 26)
- Listed height: 193 cm (6 ft 4 in)
- Position: Point guard, shooting guard
- Number: 18

Career history
- 2017–2020: Elitzur Netanya B.C.
- 2020–2023: Hapoel Tel Aviv B.C.
- 2022–2023: Ironi Ness Ziona B.C.
- 2023–2025: Ironi Kiryat Ata B.C.
- 2025–2026: Hapoel Galil Elyon

Raz Adam (Hebrew: רז אדם; 20 October 1999 – 20 May 2026) was an Israeli professional basketball player. He played as a point guard and shooting guard.

== Club career ==
Adam was born and grew up in Netanya, where he played for the local youth team since he was 7. As a teenager, he played for the professional club Elitzur Netanya B.C., reaching the semifinals of the 2016–17 Israeli Youth Basketball Premier League. During high school, he attended the basketball program at Moshe Sharet High School, leading them to the Israeli High School Premier League finals that same season, where he was named the league's MVP.

His first senior season was in 2017–18 with Elitzur Netanya B.C. At the end of the season, the team was promoted to the National League (Liga Leumit), and Adam remained with the club for another season. In the 2019–20 season, he was named team captain, and at its conclusion, he was named the league's "Discovery of the Year" (Breakthrough Player). Following the premature end of the season due to the COVID-19 pandemic, he signed with Hapoel Tel Aviv B.C. for the remainder of the Premier League season, extending his contract in August 2020. On 14 July 2022, he was loaned to Ironi Ness Ziona B.C. for one season.

In June 2023, he signed a two-year contract with Ironi Kiryat Ata B.C., extending his contract the following year for an additional season.

== International career ==
In 2017, Adam played for the under-18 national team at the FIBA U18 EuroBasket Division B tournament in Estonia.

In July 2018, he won the FIBA U20 EuroBasket in Germany with the Israel men's national under-20 basketball team, and in July 2019 won the tournament again on home soil in Israel. In his best game of the 2019 tournament, a quarterfinal match against Lithuania, he scored 17 points.

== Personal life and death ==
Adam was interested in history, and was known for his humor and wit, both on and off the court.

On 20 May 2026, Adam was killed in a traffic collision on Highway 90, at an intersection near the entrance road to the Hula Nature Reserve. A player for Hapoel Galil Elyon, he was on his way to a team meeting when his car collided with another vehicle. Magen David Adom paramedics called to the scene pronounced him dead. He was buried at the Shikun Vatikim cemetery in his hometown of Netanya. His funeral was attended by hundreds of figures from the Israeli basketball community, including players, coaches, and fans.
