= Bonzie Colson =

American basketball player (born 1996)

- Colson with Maccabi Tel Aviv in 2026

No. 50 – Maccabi Tel Aviv
- Position: Small forward / power forward
- League: Ligat HaAl; EuroLeague

Personal information
- Born: January 12, 1996 (age 30) Washington, D.C., U.S.
- Listed height: 6 ft 6 in (1.98 m)
- Listed weight: 225 lb (102 kg)

Career information
- High school: St. Andrew's School (Barrington, Rhode Island)
- College: Notre Dame (2014–2018)
- NBA draft: 2018: undrafted
- Playing career: 2018–present

Career history
- 2018–2019: Canton Charge
- 2019: Milwaukee Bucks
- 2019: →Wisconsin Herd
- 2019–2020: Darüşşafaka
- 2020–2021: Strasbourg
- 2021–2022: Karşıyaka
- 2022–2024: Maccabi Tel Aviv
- 2024–2026: Fenerbahçe
- 2026–present: Maccabi Tel Aviv

Career highlights
- EuroLeague champion (2025); FIBA Champions League MVP (2021); All-FIBA Champions League First Team (2021); FIBA Champions League Top Scorer (2021); 2× Israeli Premier League champion (2023, 2024); Israeli League Cup winner (2022); 2× Turkish Super League champion (2025, 2026); 2× Turkish Cup winner (2025, 2026); Turkish Super Cup winner (2025); LNB Élite MVP (2021); All-LNB Élite First Team (2021); Third-team All-American – AP, SN (2017); First-team All-ACC (2017)
- Stats at NBA.com
- Stats at Basketball Reference

Bonzie Alexander Colson II (born January 12, 1996) is an American professional basketball player for Maccabi Tel Aviv of the Israeli Ligat HaAl and the EuroLeague. He played college basketball for the Notre Dame Fighting Irish.

== Early development ==
Colson, the son of a former Rhode Island player who went into college coaching, played high school basketball in that state at St. Andrew's School in Barrington, as well as AAU basketball with Boston Area Basketball Club. He developed as a pure post player, but was abnormally short for the position—during a basketball camp in summer 2013, he measured at 6 ft 4.5 in (1.943 m) in shoes. Despite his physical stature, advanced statistics showed him to be unusually effective in the frontcourt; in July 2013, Colson had the top player efficiency rating (PER) among frontcourt players in Nike's Elite Youth Basketball League.

While Colson was largely ignored by major programs as a frontcourt prospect, Notre Dame assistant Martin Ingelsby, who went on to become head coach at Delaware, had a very different view, based on Colson's production in both high school and AAU play, as well as a disproportionate wingspan of 6 ft 11.5 in (2.121 m). When Colson visited Notre Dame in September 2013, the coaching staff made Nike's PER study a major part of its pitch, convincing him that the Fighting Irish program, devoted to offensive efficiency, would be the best fit for a player of his type. He would commit to Notre Dame that October.

== College career ==
In Colson's freshman season at Notre Dame, he came off the bench for 31 of his 32 appearances. He recorded a 17-point performance in a win over Duke in the semi-final game of the ACC Tournament. At the end of the season, he was named Notre Dame Newcomer of the Year. Colson appeared in 36 games in his sophomore season, starting in 24. He recorded the first 30-point game of his career on January 16, 2016, leading Notre Dame to its first victory over Duke at Cameron Indoor Stadium.

In his junior season, Colson became Notre Dame's leading scorer (17.8 points per game; 9th in the ACC), led the ACC in rebounding (10.1 per game) and was eighth in blocks per game (1.4), and was named to the All-ACC first team. He was also the first player shorter than 6' 7" to lead the ACC in rebounding since 1958.

Prior to the 2017–18 season, Colson was named the preseason ACC Player of the Year and a first-team preseason All-American by the Associated Press. After missing 15 games during the regular season with a broken foot, Colson broke his left foot again in Notre Dame's NIT tournament game against Penn State. In 2017–18, he averaged 19.7 points per game (3rd in the ACC), 10.1 rebounds (3rd), 1.7 steals (6th), and 2.2 blocks (5th).

== Professional career ==
=== Canton Charge (2018–2019) ===
On September 18, 2018, Colson signed with the Cleveland Cavaliers. On October 13, he was waived by the Cavaliers, but was added to the roster of the Cavs' NBA G League affiliate, the Canton Charge. In his first G League game, a 101–89 loss to the Wisconsin Herd, Colson led the team with 23 points and 15 rebounds, shooting 10-of-18 from the floor. For the G League team, in 23 games he averaged 15.5 points, 7.8 rebounds, and 1.5 blocks per game.

=== Milwaukee Bucks (2019) ===
On January 15, 2019, Colson was signed to a two-way contract by the Milwaukee Bucks. Under the terms of the deal, he split time with the Bucks' G League affiliate, the Wisconsin Herd. For the G League team, in 23 games he averaged 14.3 points, 6.0 rebounds, and 0.8 blocks per game. Colson made his NBA debut on February 25, 2019, against the Chicago Bulls, playing three minutes in the Bucks 117–106 win.

On March 31, Colson started his first NBA game against the Atlanta Hawks and in that game, he managed to score 15 points and grabbed 16 rebounds in 41 minutes of playing time.

On July 21, 2019, Colson was waived by the Bucks.

=== Darüşşafaka (2019–2020) ===
On July 30, 2019, Colson signed with Darüşşafaka. Colson and the team mutually parted ways on April 24, 2020. Colson averaged 12.2 points and 5.1 rebounds per game in the Turkish League and 10.8 points and 5.0 rebounds in EuroCup play.

=== SIG Strasbourg (2020–2021) ===
On August 31, 2020, Colson signed with SIG Strasbourg. He was named player of the week on October 14, after posting 24 points, nine rebounds and two assists in a win against Orléans Loiret Basket. In 49 games he averaged 18.1 points, 5.3 rebounds, and 0.6 blocks per game. In games in the Jeep Elite he was 2nd in the league with 18.4 points per game. He was selected Most Valuable Player for the regular season of 2020–21 Basketball Champions League.

=== Pınar Karşıyaka (2021–2022) ===
On July 10, 2021, Colson signed with Pınar Karşıyaka of the Turkish Super League In 42 games he averaged 15.9 points, 7.2 rebounds, and 0.8 blocks per game. In games in the Turkish Super League he was 7th in the league with 16.9 points per game, 7th with 7.0 rebounds per game, 7th with 1.6 steals per game, and 9th with 0.8 blocks per game.

=== Maccabi Tel Aviv (2022–2024) ===
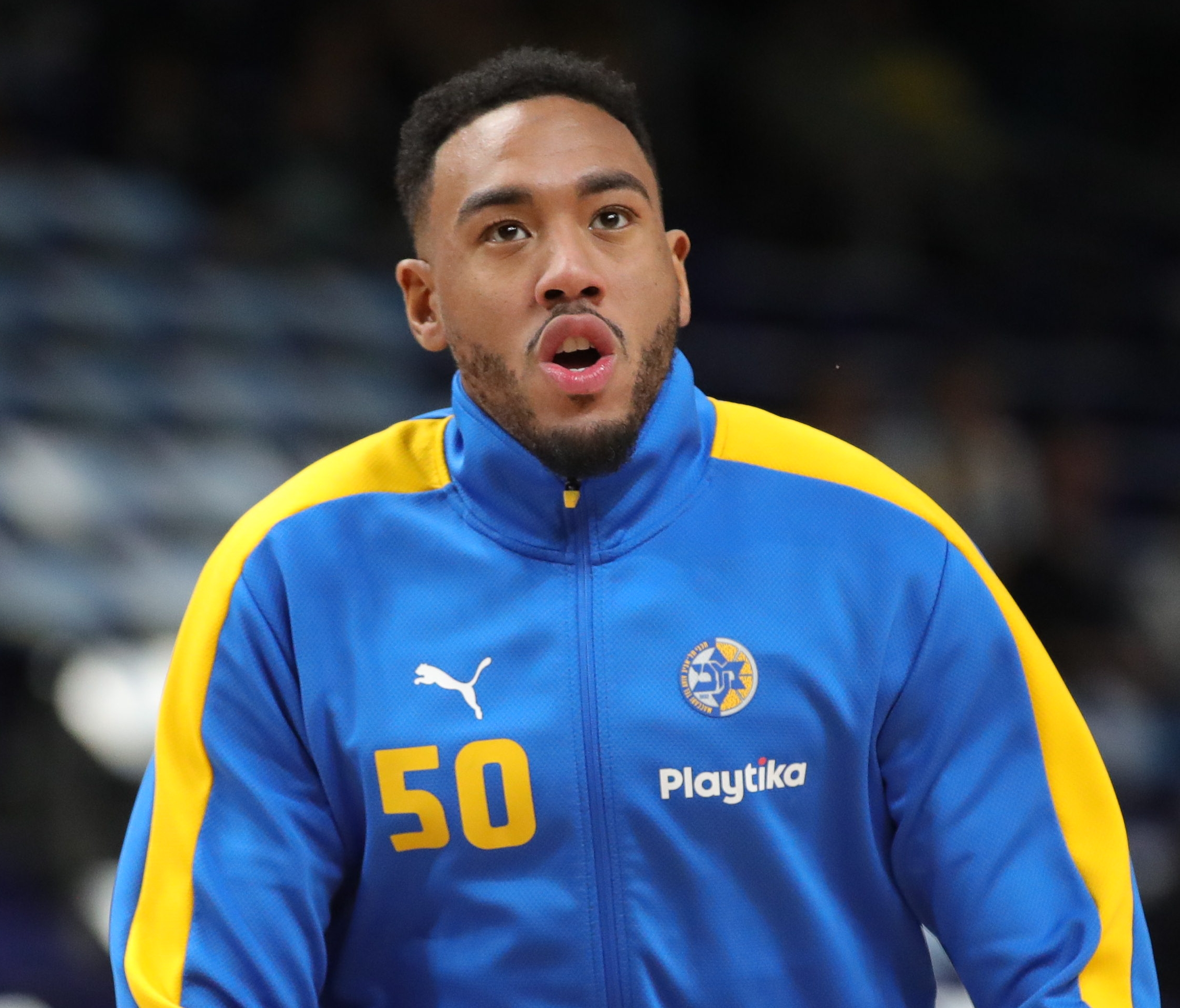
Colson with Maccabi Tel Aviv in 2022

On June 22, 2022, he signed with Maccabi Tel Aviv of the Israeli Basketball Premier League.

=== Fenerbahçe (2024–2026) ===
On June 28th, 2024, Colson signed a three-year deal with Fenerbahçe.

On May 25, 2025, he helped Fenerbahçe to their second EuroLeague championship in Abu Dhabi.

=== Return to Maccabi Tel Aviv (2026–present) ===
On June 28, 2026, Colson signed a 2-year deal with his former club, Israeli powerhouse Maccabi Tel Aviv. The Israeli club paid the buyout clause of 200k dollars, and will pay Colson a salary of 1.5 million dollars a year.

== Playing style ==
In a 2016 story, Sports Illustrated writer Luke Winn called Colson "one of college basketball's greatest anomalies." While Colson was not much larger than in high school—by then, he claimed to be 6 ft 5 in (1.96 m) tall with a 7 ft (2.1 m) wingspan—Notre Dame was frequently playing him as a center alongside four guards, three of them taller than Colson. As early as his high school and AAU days, according to Winn, "he knew how to work angles to get off all kinds of funky shots" and "played with a chip on his shoulder due to being ignored by many big-time schools". In his final two seasons at Notre Dame, Colson began to include three-pointers in his skill set, enabling him to also play as a stretch four in some Notre Dame lineups. He began this process in summer 2016, when he spent five days in California with NBA player Jared Dudley, whom Colson had known as a young boy while his father was coaching Dudley at Boston College.

== Career statistics ==
Legend
GP	Games played	GS	Games started	MPG	Minutes per game
FG%	Field-goal percentage	3P%	3-point field-goal percentage	FT%	Free-throw percentage
RPG	Rebounds per game	APG	Assists per game	SPG	Steals per game
BPG	Blocks per game	PPG	Points per game	PIR	Performance index rating
**Bold**	Career high

=== NBA ===
==== Regular season ====
Year	Team	GP	GS	MPG	FG%	3P%	FT%	RPG	APG	SPG	BPG	PPG
2018–19	Milwaukee	8	2	12.3	.333	.238	.889	3.8	.4	.6	.1	4.9
Career		8	2	12.3	.333	.238	.889	3.8	.4	.6	.1	4.9

=== EuroLeague ===
As of match played 1 October 2025

†	Won the league

Year	Team	GP	GS	MPG	FG%	3P%	FT%	RPG	APG	SPG	BPG	PPG	PIR
2022–23	Maccabi Tel Aviv	39	31	26.1	**.506**	.376	.775	**5.6**	**.6**	**1.3**	**.7**	10.7	13.1
2023–24	Maccabi Tel Aviv	**40**	**40**	**28.5**	.489	**.387**	**.794**	5.3	**.6**	**1.3**	.4	**12.6**	**14.1**
2024–25†	Fenerbahçe	39	35	18.3	.478	.357	.658	3.5	.5	.6	.1	6.7	6.8
2025–26	Fenerbahçe	1	1	14.1	.750	.000	1.000	2.0	2.0	.0	.0	7.0	12.0
Career		119	107	24.1	.546	.373	.764	4.8	.6	1.0	.2	10.0	11.4

=== EuroCup ===
Year	Team	GP	GS	MPG	FG%	3P%	FT%	RPG	APG	SPG	BPG	PPG	PIR
2019–20	Darüşşafaka	16	9	22.4	.404	.459	.849	5.0	.6	.9	.9	10.8	11.1
Career		16	9	22.4	.404	.459	.849	5.0	.6	.9	.9	10.8	11.1

=== Basketball Champions League ===
Year	Team	GP	GS	MPG	FG%	3P%	FT%	RPG	APG	SPG	BPG	PPG
2020–21	SIG Strasbourg	**14**	**14**	29.5	**.455**	.324	.814	5.9	1.7	1.1	.6	**18.1**
2021–22	Karşıyaka	9	9	**34.7**	.446	**.342**	**.917**	**7.2**	**2.1**	**1.7**	**.8**	15.0
Career		23	23	31.5	.452	.330	.843	6.4	1.9	1.3	.7	16.9

=== Domestic leagues ===
†	Denotes seasons in which Colson won the domestic league

Year	Team	League	GP	MPG	FG%	3P%	FT%	RPG	APG	SPG	BPG	PPG
2018–19	(United States) Canton Charge	G League	23	28.9	.489	.385	.667	7.8	1.6	.7	1.5	15.5
2018–19	(United States) Wisconsin Herd	G League	23	32.8	.420	.288	.773	6.0	1.5	.9	.8	14.3
2019–20	(Turkey) Darüşşafaka	TBSL	23	22.2	.515	.368	.900	5.2	1.0	1.4	.6	12.2
2020–21	(France) SIG Strasbourg	LNB Élite	35	29.2	.521	.342	.839	5.1	2.0	1.2	.6	18.1
2021–22	(Turkey) Karşıyaka	TBSL	32	32.7	.494	.364	.724	7.0	1.5	1.5	.8	16.2
2022–23 †	(Israel) Maccabi Tel Aviv	Ligat HaAl	27	22.0	.515	.385	.804	4.5	.8	1.2	.6	10.8
2023–24 †	(Israel) Maccabi Tel Aviv	Ligat HaAl	22	25.2	.455	.311	.848	5.0	.5	1.0	.4	11.9
2024–25 †	(Turkey) Fenerbahçe	TBSL	25	19.9	.585	.424	.710	3.9	1.0	.8	.2	8.3

=== College ===
Year	Team	GP	GS	MPG	FG%	3P%	FT%	RPG	APG	SPG	BPG	PPG
2014–15	Notre Dame	32	1	12.1	**.595**	.143	.754	2.7	.4	.6	.7	5.6
2015–16	Notre Dame	**36**	24	25.3	.532	.333	.774	6.7	.9	.9	1.0	11.1
2016–17	Notre Dame	**36**	**36**	32.1	.526	**.433**	**.783**	**10.1**	**1.6**	1.1	1.4	17.8
2017–18	Notre Dame	21	21	**32.4**	.503	.293	.761	**10.1**	.9	**1.7**	**2.2**	**19.7**
Career		125	82	25.1	.528	.350	.772	7.2	1.0	1.0	1.2	13.1
