= Roman Sorkin =

Israeli basketball player (born 1996)

Roman Sorkin רומן סורקין
- Sorkin with Maccabi Tel Aviv in 2026

No. 9 – Maccabi Tel Aviv
- Position: Power forward / center
- League: Israeli Basketball Premier League; EuroLeague

Personal information
- Born: 11 August 1996 (age 30) Minsk, Belarus
- Listed height: 2.08 m (6 ft 10 in)
- Listed weight: 104 kg (229 lb)

Career information
- College: Oregon (2014–2018)
- NBA draft: 2018: undrafted
- Playing career: 2018–present

Career history
- 2018–2021: Maccabi Haifa
- 2021–present: Maccabi Tel Aviv

Career highlights
- 3× Israeli League champion (2023, 2024, 2026); Israeli National League champion (2019); Israeli Cup winner (2025); 3× Israeli League Cup winner (2021, 2022, 2024); Israeli League MVP (2024); Israeli League Finals MVP (2024); 4× All-Israeli League First Team (2023–2026); All-Israeli League Second Team (2022)

Roman Sorkin (Hebrew: רומן סורקין, Belarusian: Раман Соркін; born 11 August 1996) is a Belarusian-born Israeli professional basketball player for Maccabi Tel Aviv of the Israeli Basketball Premier League and the EuroLeague. He played college basketball for the University of Oregon, before playing professionally in Israel.

== Early life and college career ==
Sorkin was born to Jewish parents in Minsk, Belarus. At the age of two, he immigrated to Israel, and grew up in Ashdod, Israel.

Sorkin played four years of college basketball at the University of Oregon, where he studied social science. On 10 November 2017, Sorkin recorded a career-high 23 points and seven rebounds in his career start, while shooting 8-of-9 from the field, in a 70–54 win over Coppin State. In his college career, he had a 56.9% two-point shooting percentage, and shot 83.3% from the line.

== Professional career ==
=== Maccabi Haifa (2018–2021) ===
On 28 April 2018, Sorkin started his professional career with Maccabi Haifa of the Israeli Premier League, signing a three-year deal. That season, Haifa finished the season in the last place out of 12 teams and was relegated to the Israeli National League (the second-tier league in Israel).

On 12 April 2019, Sorkin recorded a season-high 19 points, while shooting 7-of-11 from the field, along with eight rebounds in a 77–79 loss to Hapoel Afula. In 30 games played during the 2018–19 season, he averaged 8.4 points and 4.4 rebounds per game. Sorkin won the 2019 Israeli National League Championship title with Haifa, earning a promotion back to the Israeli Premier League.

On 8 December 2019, Sorkin scored a game-winner shot with 1.6 seconds left, giving Haifa a 77–75 win over Hapoel Be'er Sheva. On 3 February 2020, Sorkin recorded a career-high 22 points, while shooting 6-of-6 from three point range, along with five rebounds in a 93–84 win over Hapoel Gilboa Galil.

=== Maccabi Tel Aviv (2021–present) ===
On 21 July 2021, Sorkin signed a one-year contract with Maccabi Tel Aviv of the Israeli Premier League and the EuroLeague, with an option for an additional season. On 6 February 2023, Sorkin signed a new two-year contract with the Israeli powerhouse.

Sorkin has won the 2022–23 and 2023–24 Israeli Basketball Premier League with Maccabi Tel Aviv.

== National team career ==
Sorkin was a member of the Israeli under-16, under-18, and under-20 national teams.

In August 2014, Sorkin participated in the 2014 FIBA Europe Under-18 Championship Division B, where he averaged 14.1 points and 9.9 rebounds per game.

== Career statistics ==
Legend
GP	Games played	GS	Games started	MPG	Minutes per game
FG%	Field-goal percentage	3P%	3-point field-goal percentage	FT%	Free-throw percentage
RPG	Rebounds per game	APG	Assists per game	SPG	Steals per game
BPG	Blocks per game	PPG	Points per game	PIR	Performance index rating
**Bold**	Career high

=== EuroLeague ===
Year	Team	GP	GS	MPG	FG%	3P%	FT%	RPG	APG	SPG	BPG	PPG	PIR
2021–22	Maccabi Tel Aviv	22	1	8.3	.548	.300	.583	1.8	.2	**.3**	.3	2.9	3.2
2022–23	Maccabi Tel Aviv	**36**	4	**16.3**	**.652**	.154	.667	**3.2**	**.8**	**.3**	**.8**	**6.8**	**8.9**
2023–24	Maccabi Tel Aviv	32	**7**	15.8	.521	**.375**	**.786**	3.1	.5	**.3**	.6	**6.8**	6.5
Career		90	12	14.2	.582	.309	.692	2.8	.5	.3	.6	5.8	6.7

=== Domestic leagues ===
Year	Team	League	GP	MPG	FG%	3P%	FT%	RPG	APG	SPG	BPG	PPG
2017–18	(Israel) Maccabi Haifa	Ligat HaAl	3	7.0	.750	.000	1.000	2.0	—	.3	.3	5.0
2018–19	(Israel) Maccabi Haifa	Liga Leumit	21	14.5	.452	.313	.560	4.0	.8	.6	.7	7.9
2019–20	(Israel) Maccabi Haifa	Ligat HaAl	30	22.4	.496	.392	.595	4.7	1.2	.9	.9	10.6
2020–21	(Israel) Maccabi Haifa	Ligat HaAl	29	29.0	.444	.178	.744	7.2	2.0	.5	.9	13.4
2020–21	(Israel) Maccabi Haifa	BIBL	4	23.5	.483	.333	.667	6.5	.5	.7	.5	17.5
2021–22	(Israel) Maccabi Tel Aviv	Ligat HaAl	31	19.2	.582	.269	.756	4.1	.7	.5	1.1	9.2
2022–23	(Israel) Maccabi Tel Aviv	Ligat HaAl	35	18.4	.650	.143	.807	5.6	1.0	.4	.5	10.6
2023–24	(Israel) Maccabi Tel Aviv	Ligat HaAl	32	22.9	.615	.508	.689	6.1	1.1	.8	1.1	15.9

=== College ===
Year	Team	GP	GS	MPG	FG%	3P%	FT%	RPG	APG	SPG	BPG	PPG
2014–15	Oregon	8	0	4.4	.455	.333	.500	1.0	.1	—	.1	1.6
2015–16	Oregon	22	0	5.6	.469	.267	.778	1.0	.2	—	.1	1.9
2016–17	Oregon	**23**	0	**8.0**	.453	**.476**	**.938**	**1.9**	**.5**	—	**.3**	**3.2**
2017–18	Oregon	21	**2**	6.7	**.489**	.333	.778	.9	.2	—	**.3**	2.9
Career		74	2	6.5	.468	.362	.833	1.2	.3	—	.3	2.5
