= Josh Nebo =

American basketball player (born 1997)

- Nebo with FC Barcelona in 2026

No. 32 – FC Barcelona
- Position: Center
- League: Liga ACB; EuroLeague

Personal information
- Born: July 17, 1997 (age 29) Houston, Texas, U.S.
- Listed height: 6 ft 9 in (2.06 m)
- Listed weight: 245 lb (111 kg)

Career information
- High school: Cypress Lakes (Katy, Texas)
- College: Saint Francis (PA) (2015–2017); Texas A&M (2018–2020)
- NBA draft: 2020: undrafted
- Playing career: 2020–present

Career history
- 2020–2021: Hapoel Eilat
- 2021–2022: Žalgiris Kaunas
- 2022–2024: Maccabi Tel Aviv
- 2024–2026: Olimpia Milano
- 2026–present: FC Barcelona

Career highlights
- EuroLeague rebounding leader (2024); 2× Israeli Premier League champion (2023, 2024); Israeli League Cup winner (2022); Lega Serie A champion (2026); Italian Cup winner (2026); King Mindaugas Cup winner (2022); 2× Italian Supercup winner (2024, 2025); Israeli League rebounding leader (2021); NEC Defensive Player of the Year (2017); Third-team All-NEC (2017)

Joshua Okechukwu Nebo (born July 17, 1997) is an American–born naturalized Slovenian professional basketball player for FC Barcelona of the Liga ACB and the EuroLeague. He played college basketball for the Saint Francis Red Flash and the Texas A&M Aggies. In 2020-21 he led the Israel Basketball Premier League in rebounds per game. Born in the United States, he plays for the Slovenia national team.

== Early life ==
Nebo was born in Houston and later lived in Katy, Texas, and grew up skateboarding and playing defensive end in football. He first began playing basketball in middle school. Nebo attended Cypress Lakes High School, where he was frequently overshadowed by teammate De'Aaron Fox. As a senior, Nebo helped lead Cypress Lakes to the Class 6A state quarterfinals in 2015. Lightly recruited, he signed with Saint Francis (PA).

== College career ==
Nebo grew three inches and gained 50 pounds during his first two years in college. He averaged 4.9 points and 5.1 rebounds per game as a freshman at Saint Francis and finished second in the conference in blocks with 56. On February 2, 2017, he scored a career-high 24 points and grabbed 11 rebounds in a 78–61 win over St. Francis Brooklyn. As a sophomore, Nebo averaged 12 points and 8.3 rebounds per game. Nebo was named to the Third Team All-Northeast Conference (NEC) and NEC Defensive Player of the Year during his sophomore season after setting the single-season record with 89 blocks. Following the season, he transferred to Texas A&M.

Nebo cited homesickness and the fact that his parents were not able to attend his games as the reasons for his transfer. He scored a season-high 21 points and had seven rebounds on January 12, 2019, in an 81–80 win against Alabama. Nebo made two starts as a junior and averaged 8.1 points and 5.3 rebounds per game. Coming into his senior season, he missed much of the preseason with a torn hamstring. Nebo scored a season-high 21 points in an 87–75 victory against Mississippi State on February 22, 2020. As a senior, Nebo averaged 12.5 points and 6.2 rebounds per game.

== Professional career ==
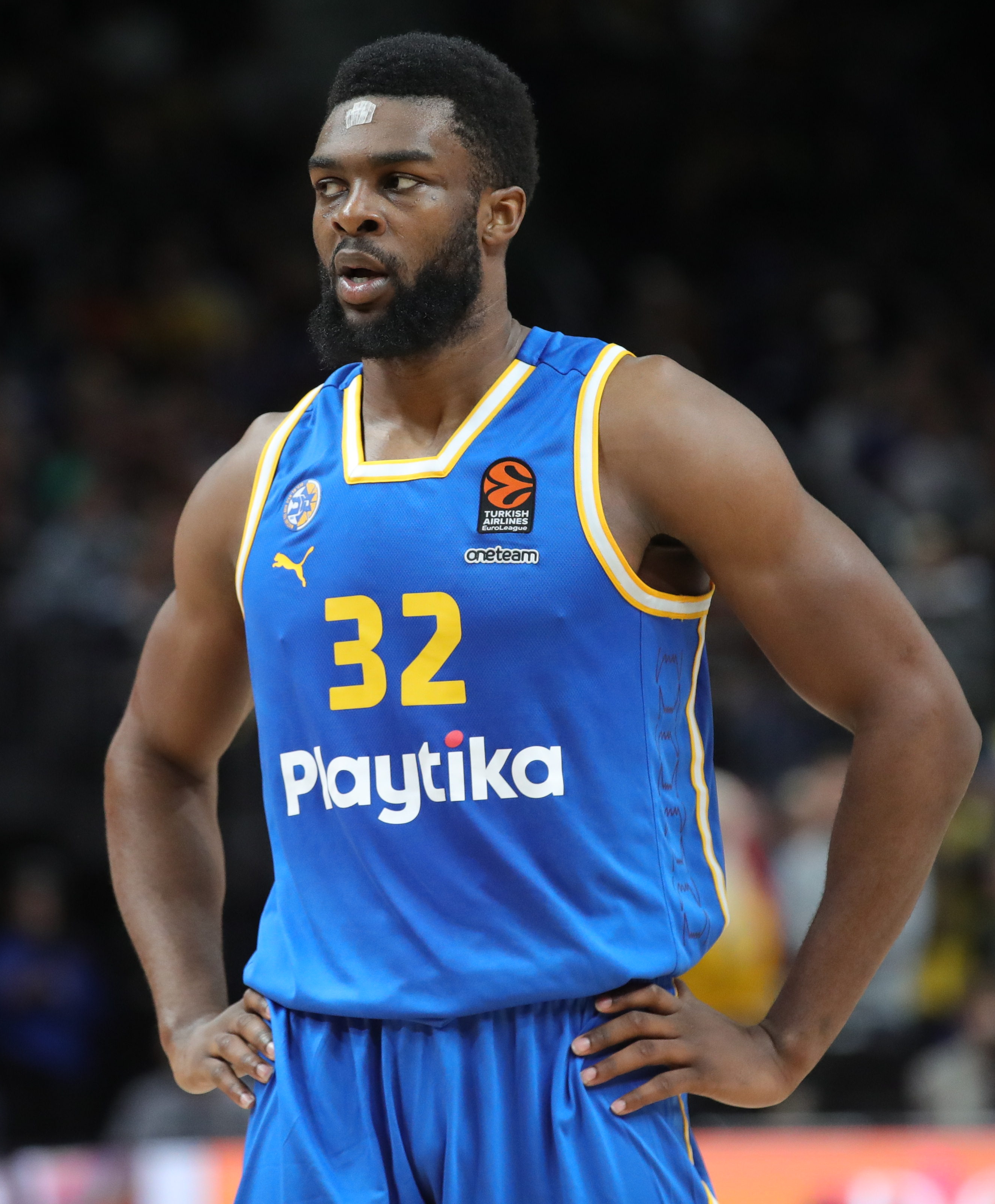
Josh Nebo

=== Hapoel Yossi Avrahami Eilat (2020–2021) ===
On July 26, 2020, Nebo signed with Hapoel Eilat of the Israeli Basketball Premier League. He averaged 13.9 points per game and led the Israeli Basketball Premier League with 9.9 rebounds per game, was third with a .665 field goal percentage, and was sixth with 1.1 blocks per game. He was named 2021 Eurobasket All-Israeli League Second Team.

=== B.C. Zalgiris Kaunas (2021–2022) ===
On June 21, 2021, Nebo signed with Žalgiris Kaunas of the Lithuanian Basketball League. Playing for them in the Euroleauge Nebo started 17 out of 28 games and averaged 8.8 points (65% from 2-point range) and 6.2 rebounds (6th-best in the league).

=== Maccabi Playtika Tel-Aviv (2022–2024) ===
On July 1, 2022, Nebo signed with Israeli powerhouse Maccabi Tel Aviv. In 39 EuroLeague games (33 starts), he averaged 7.4 points and 6.2 rebounds in 22 minutes per contest. On July 18, 2023, Nebo renewed his contract with Maccabi.

In March 2024, Nebo was named MVP of Round 29 after beating KK Crvena zvezda. He had 18 points and 13 rebounds.

=== Olimpia Milano (2024–2026) ===
On June 24, 2024, Nebo signed a two-year deal with Olimpia Milano of the LBA and the EuroLeague.

In October 2024, Nebo reported a muscle injury in the left groin region during the Monaco Euroleague game. In November 2024, Nebo was injured again as he reported an injury to his right arm and would be out for two weeks.

In October 2025, Nebo suffered a biceps femoris injury to his right thigh during the game against Partizan Belgrade. In November 2025, Nebo was injured after suffering a concussion in a locker room accident. He missed over a month at the start of the season due to a right thigh muscle injury.

On July 14, 2026, Olimpia Milano announced Nebo was leaving the team after two seasons.

=== FC Barcelona (2026–present) ===
On July 15, 2026, Nebo signed with FC Barcelona of the Liga ACB and the EuroLeague. The deal linked Nebo to Barcelona until 2029.

== National team career ==
In June 2024, Nebo received a Slovenian passport and became eligible to play for the Slovenia national team ahead of the 2024 Olympic Qualifiers. On June 23, 2024, he made his debut for Slovenia in a friendly against Lithuania, putting up nine points and eight rebounds.

== Career statistics ==
Legend
| GP | Games played | GS | Games started | MPG | Minutes per game |
| FG% | Field-goal percentage | 3P% | 3-point field-goal percentage | FT% | Free-throw percentage |
| RPG | Rebounds per game | APG | Assists per game | SPG | Steals per game |
| BPG | Blocks per game | PPG | Points per game | PIR | Performance index rating |
| **Bold** | Career high | * | Led the league |

=== EuroLeague ===
| Year | Team | GP | GS | MPG | FG% | 3P% | FT% | RPG | APG | SPG | BPG | PPG | PIR |
|---|---|---|---|---|---|---|---|---|---|---|---|---|---|
| 2021–22 | Žalgiris | 28 | 17 | 22.6 | .646 | .000 | .672 | 6.2 | .5 | **.6** | .8 | 8.8 | 12.8 |
| 2022–23 | Maccabi Tel Aviv | **39** | 33 | 21.6 | .648 | — | .613 | 6.2 | .6 | .4 | .5 | 7.4 | 11.7 |
| 2023–24 | Maccabi Tel Aviv | **39** | **39** | **23.7** | .667 | .000 | **.714** | **7.1*** | **.6** | **.6** | .9 | **11.2** | **16.7** |
| 2024–25 | Olimpia Milano | 4 | 3 | 19.3 | .609 | — | .500 | 4.5 | **.8** | .3 | **1.0** | 8.3 | 10.5 |
| 2025–26 | Olimpia Milano | 26 | 14 | 21.5 | **.676** | .000 | .663 | 5.5 | .5 | .3 | .8 | 10.2 | 13.7 |
| Career | | 136 | 106 | 22.2 | .661 | .000 | .666 | 6.3 | .6 | .5 | .8 | 9.3 | 13.7 |

=== Domestic leagues ===
| Year | Team | League | GP | MPG | FG% | 3P% | FT% | RPG | APG | SPG | BPG | PPG |
|---|---|---|---|---|---|---|---|---|---|---|---|---|
| 2020–21 | (Israel) Hapoel Eilat | Ligat HaAl | 26 | 30.0 | .665 | .000 | .629 | 9.9 | .3 | .4 | 1.1 | 13.6 |
| 2020–21 | (Israel) Hapoel Eilat | BIBL | 4 | 29.5 | .523 | .000 | .900 | 8.5 | .5 | .7 | 1.2 | 16.0 |
| 2021–22 | (Lithuania) Žalgiris | LKL | 41 | 18.7 | .665 | — | .639 | 4.9 | .7 | .4 | .8 | 6.8 |
| 2022–23 | (Israel) Maccabi Tel Aviv | Ligat HaAl | 20 | 17.8 | .711 | — | .593 | 5.1 | .4 | .3 | .6 | 7.7 |
| 2023–24 | (Israel) Maccabi Tel Aviv | Ligat HaAl | 28 | 19.9 | .723 | — | .724 | 6.1 | .7 | .4 | .4 | 10.5 |
| 2024–25 | (Italy) Olimpia Milano | LBA | 5 | 17.6 | .607 | — | .750 | 4.8 | .8 | .2 | .8 | 8.0 |

=== College ===
| Year | Team | GP | GS | MPG | FG% | 3P% | FT% | RPG | APG | SPG | BPG | PPG |
|---|---|---|---|---|---|---|---|---|---|---|---|---|
| 2015–16 | Saint Francis | 30 | 29 | 22.8 | .487 | — | .522 | 5.8 | .5 | .2 | 1.9 | 4.9 |
| 2016–17 | Saint Francis | **34** | **32** | **29.7** | .566 | **.500** | .595 | **8.2** | .7 | .3 | **2.6** | 12.0 |
| 2017–18 | Texas A&M | Redshirt | | | | | | | | | | |
| 2018–19 | Texas A&M | 30 | 2 | 19.6 | **.699** | — | **.695** | 5.4 | .3 | .2 | 2.3 | 8.1 |
| 2019–20 | Texas A&M | 29 | 27 | 28.8 | .665 | .000 | .613 | 6.2 | **.8** | **.4** | 1.9 | **12.5** |
| Career | | 123 | 90 | 25.4 | .604 | .333 | .609 | 6.3 | .6 | .3 | 2.2 | 9.4 |
