= Amin Stevens =

American basketball player (born 1990)

Amin Khalil Stevens
No. 3 – Ironi Nahariya
- Position: Power forward
- League: Liga Leumit

Personal information
- Born: 26 October 1990 (age 35) Roswell, Georgia, U.S.
- Listed height: 6 ft 8 in (2.03 m)
- Listed weight: 216 lb (98 kg)

Career information
- High school: Mount Vernon Presbyterian (Sandy Springs, Georgia)
- College: Florida A&M (2009–2012)
- Playing career: 2012–present

Career history
- 2012–2013: MBK Rieker Komárno
- 2013–2014: Fürstenfeld Panthers
- 2014–2015: BC Vienna
- 2015–2016: Löwen Braunschweig
- 2016–2017: Keflavík
- 2017–2018: Rouen Métropole
- 2018–2019: Brussels
- 2019–2020: Maccabi Kiryat Motzkin
- 2020–2021: Rouen Métropole
- 2021–2023: Ironi Kiryat Ata
- 2023–2025: Maccabi Ramat Gan
- 2025–2026: Maccabi Rishon LeZion
- 2026–present: Ironi Nahariya

Career highlights
- FIBA Champions League Top Scorer (2025); Liga Leumit champion (2022); Slovak Basketball Cup winner (2013); Úrvalsdeild Foreign Player of the Year (2017); PBL All-Offensive team (2019); Úrvalsdeild karla scoring leader (2017); Úrvalsdeild karla rebounding leader (2017); LNB Pro B scoring leader (2018); LNB Pro B rebounding leader (2018)

Amin Khalil Stevens (born October 26, 1990) is an American professional basketball player for Ironi Nahariya of the Liga Leumit. Before his professional career, he played college basketball for Florida A&M. In 2013 he won the Slovak Basketball Cup with MBK Rieker Komárno. In 2017, he was named the Úrvalsdeild Foreign Player of the Year after leading the league in scoring and rebounds.

== High school ==
Stevens played basketball at Mount Vernon Presbyterian School in Atlanta, Georgia. In his senior season he averaged 20 points, 11 rebounds, three assists, two steals, and 1.5 blocks per game. He was named All-State, All-Region, to the NACA All-tournament team, the conference's Most Valuable Player, the Regional Tournament Most Valuable Player, and the Garden City Classic Most Valuable Player.

== College career ==
Stevens joined Florida A&M in 2009. He played three seasons for the school. In his junior season, he averaged 17.1 points, 10.4 rebounds, and 1.5 steals per game. In 84 games with Florida A&M in his career, he averaged 11.6 points, 6.8 rebounds, and 1.0 steal per game.

== Professional career ==
=== 2012–2020 ===
After leaving college, Stevens in 2012-13 joined MBK Rieker Komárno, with whom he won the Slovak Basketball Cup. In 37 games, he averaged 15.2 points (4th in the league), 7.0 rebounds (4th), 0.5 blocks (11th), and 1.1 assists.

In 2013-14 he played for Fürstenfeld Panthers, where he averaged 20.0 points (2nd in the league), 7.7 rebounds (5th), and 1.8 steals (3rd) in 29 games.

In 2014-15 he played for BC Vienna, averaging 18.2 points (leading the league), 9.1 rebounds (3rd), 1.7 steals (4th), and 1 assist in 46 games.

Stevens signed with Úrvalsdeild karla club Keflavík ahead of the 2016–17 season. He went on to average 29.5 points and 15.3 rebounds per game, leading the league in both categories, with 1.8 steals per game (4th) and a .589 field goal percentage (2nd), and was named the Úrvalsdeild Foreign Player of the Year.

He played for Rouen Métropole Basket during the 2017–18 Pro B season where Stevens led the league in both scoring (18.1) and rebounding (9.1), with 1.2 steals per game.

He spent the next two seasons with Brussels (second in the league with 7.4 rebounds per game in 2018–19) and Maccabi Kiryat Motzkin.

=== 2020–present ===
Stevens returned Rouen in June 2020. In 2020-21 he averaged 12.6 points, 7.6 rebounds, and 1.0 steals per game.

In the summer of 2021, he signed with Ironi Kiryat Ata of the Israeli Basketball Premier League.
