= Marcus Bingham Jr. =

American basketball player (born 2000)

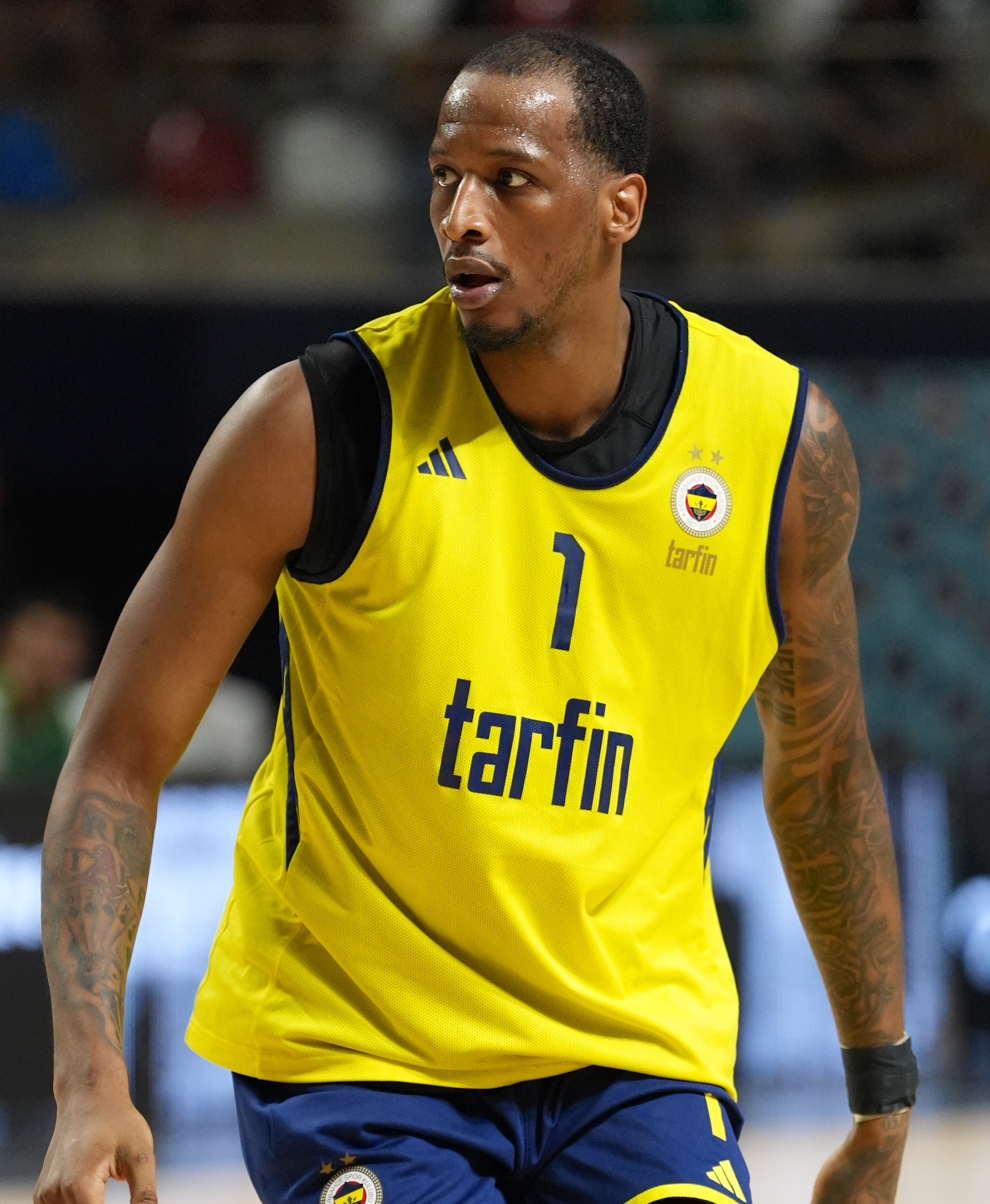
- Bingham with Fenerbahçe in 2026

No. 1 – Fenerbahçe
- Position: Center / power forward
- League: BSL; EuroLeague

Personal information
- Born: July 14, 2000 (age 26) Grand Rapids, Michigan, U.S.
- Listed height: 2.12 m (6 ft 11 in)
- Listed weight: 230 lb (104 kg)

Career information
- High school: Ottawa Hills (Grand Rapids, Michigan); Catholic Central (Grand Rapids, Michigan)
- College: Michigan State (2018–2022)
- NBA draft: 2022: undrafted
- Playing career: 2023–present

Career history
- 2023–2024: Hapoel Haifa
- 2024: Hapoel Holon
- 2024–2025: Hapoel Tel Aviv
- 2025–2026: UNICS Kazan
- 2026–present: Fenerbahçe

Career highlights
- EuroCup champion (2025)
- Stats at NBA.com
- Stats at Basketball Reference

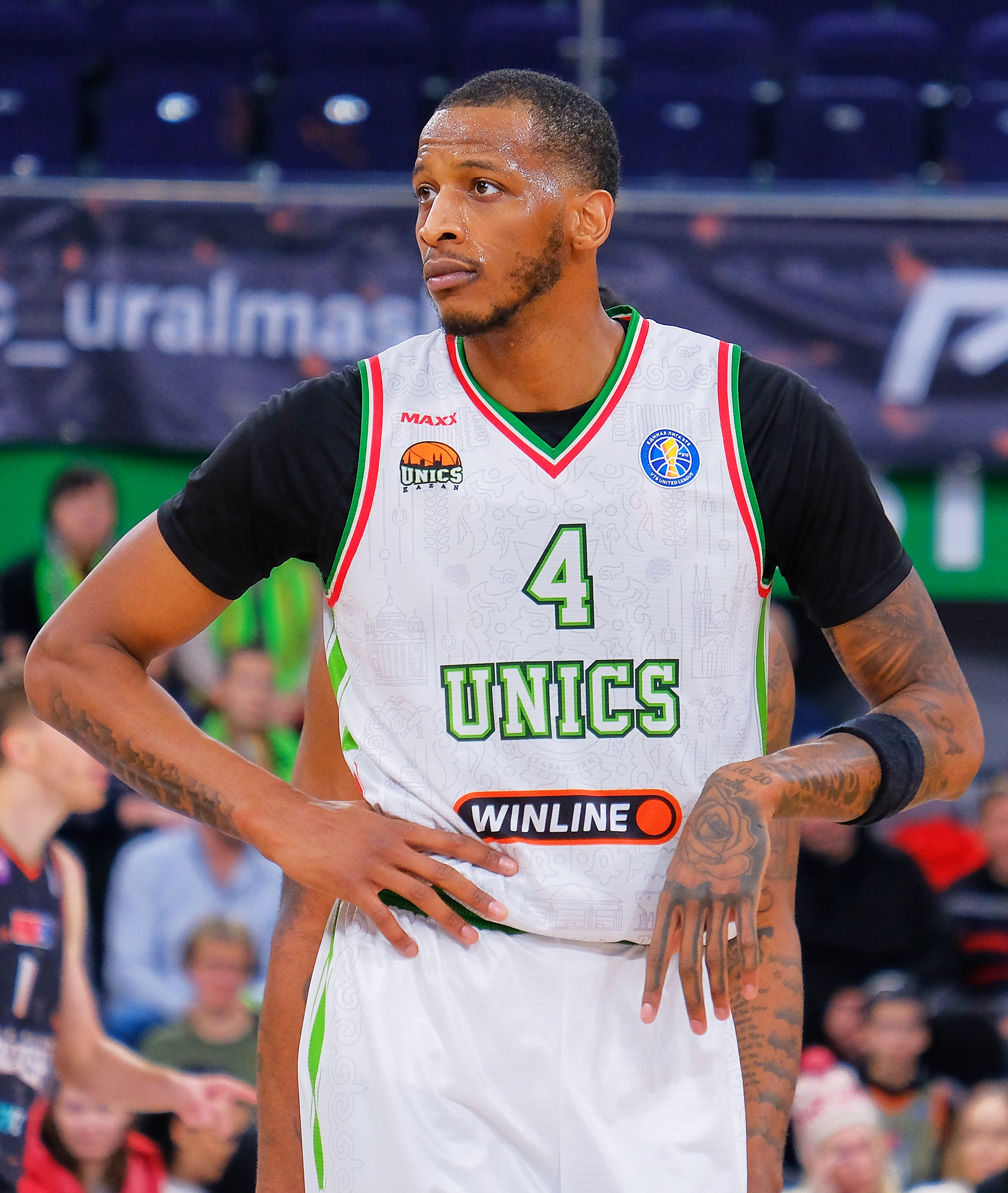
Bingham with UNICS Kazan in 2025

Marcus Jerome Bingham Jr. (born July 14, 2000) is an American professional basketball player for Fenerbahçe of the Turkish Basketbol Süper Ligi (BSL) and the EuroLeague. He played college basketball for the Michigan State Spartans.

== High school career ==
Bingham stood 6 ft 2 in (1.88 m) entering high school, starting at Central High School in Grand Rapids, Michigan, where he did not play basketball. For his sophomore season, he transferred to Ottawa Hills High School in Grand Rapids and began playing basketball recreationally, though his friends suggested he take it more seriously. During his first two years of high school, Bingham did not do homework and often misbehaved, and he held a 1.3 grade point average at Ottawa Hills. Concerned about his future, his mother had him move to Catholic Central High School in Grand Rapids, a school with superior academics, attending on probation and ultimately improving his grades. As a senior, Bingham averaged 21 points, 11 rebounds, four blocks and two assists per game. He was a finalist for Mr. Basketball of Michigan and was named Grand Rapids Press Player of the Year. A consensus four-star recruit, he committed to playing college basketball for Michigan State over offers from Butler, Pittsburgh, Purdue, VCU and Xavier.

== College career ==
Bingham had a limited role in his freshman season at Michigan State, playing 83 minutes. As a sophomore, he averaged 3.5 points, 3.6 rebounds and 1.4 blocks per game. In his junior season, Bingham averaged 3.5 points, 3.2 rebounds and 1.4 blocks per game. He improved his ballhandling and shooting skills over the summer, and grew one inch to 7 ft 0. He became a regular starter as a senior and had breakout success. On November 24, 2021, Bingham posted 11 points, nine rebounds and seven blocks, and made a game-winning dunk, in a 63–61 win against Loyola (Illinois) at the Battle 4 Atlantis first round. As a senior, he averaged 9.3 points, 6.3 rebounds and 2.2 blocks per game.

On March 31, 2022, Bingham declared for the 2022 NBA Draft.

== Professional career ==
=== Dallas Mavericks / Texas Legends (2022–2023) ===
In September 2022, he was signed by the Dallas Mavericks, but waived on October 13.

In November 2022, Bingham suffered a season ending injury prior to what would have been his professional debut.

=== Hapoel Haifa (2023–2024) ===
In July 2023 he signed with Hapoel Haifa of the Israeli Basketball Premier League for the 2023-24 season.

In October 2023, he went back home to Grand Rapids, MI days after the war broke out in Israel.

In May 2024, Bingham broke a league record that had stood since October 2014 by recording 22 points to go along with 27 rebounds.

=== Hapoel Holon (2024) ===
On July 23, 2024, he signed with Hapoel Holon of the Israeli Basketball Premier League.

On October 16, 2024, Bingham received the Hoops Agents Player of the Week for Round 2. He had the game high 27 points and 7 rebounds for his team's win.

=== Hapoel Tel Aviv (2024–2025) ===
On November 27, 2024, Bingham signed with Hapoel Tel Aviv of the Ligat HaAl. He averaged 9.3 points and 4.4 rebounds per game. On July 1, 2025, Bingham parted ways with the team.

== Career statistics ==
Legend
GP	Games played	GS	Games started	MPG	Minutes per game
FG%	Field goal percentage	3P%	3-point field goal percentage	FT%	Free throw percentage
RPG	Rebounds per game	APG	Assists per game	SPG	Steals per game
BPG	Blocks per game	PPG	Points per game	**Bold**	Career high

=== EuroLeague ===
Year	Team	GP	GS	MPG	FG%	3P%	FT%	RPG	APG	SPG	BPG	PPG	PIR
2026–27	Fenerbahçe	10	4	17.4	.547	.385	.462	4.3	.7	.7	1.5	7.4	8.7

=== College ===
Year	Team	GP	GS	MPG	FG%	3P%	FT%	RPG	APG	SPG	BPG	PPG
2018–19	Michigan State	23	0	3.6	.286	**.429**	.556	1.1	.3	.0	.4	1.0
2019–20	Michigan State	31	16	11.1	.400	.179	.634	3.6	**.4**	.2	1.4	3.5
2020–21	Michigan State	28	5	11.5	.500	.000	.738	3.2	.3	.6	1.4	3.5
2021–22	Michigan State	**35**	**32**	**18.7**	**.534**	.415	**.747**	**6.3**	.3	**.9**	**2.2**	**9.3**
Career		117	53	12.0	.486	.326	.707	3.8	.3	.5	1.4	4.7

== Personal life ==
Bingham's younger brother, Mykel, plays college basketball for Ferris State. Bingham also has 4 other siblings Bingham being the second oldest .
