= Ironi Kiryat Ata B.C. =

Basketball club in Israel

- Leagues: Israeli Basketball Premier League
- Founded: 1980; 46 years ago
- Arena: Ramaz Hall
- Capacity: 1,200
- Location: Kiryat Ata, Israel
- Team colors: Blue, white, gray
- Head coach: Eldad Bentov
- Team captain: Ido Davidi
- Championships: 1 Liga Leumit (2022)
Home	Away	Third

Ironi Kiryat Ata is an Israeli professional basketball club based in Kiryat Ata, a city in the Haifa District of Israel. The team was founded in 1980 and was promoted to the Israeli Basketball Premier League in 2022, where they currently compete in. Their home arena is the Ramaz Hall, with a capacity of 1,200 seats.

== History ==
The team was founded in 1980. The club played in Ligat HaAl, the top division of Israeli basketball, having been promoted from Liga Leumit at the end of the 2007–08 season.

The team has had various names. It was named Elitzur Kiryat Ata/Motzkin (-2000), Ironi Kiryat Ata (2000-02), Elitzur Kiryat Ata (2002-03), Ironi Kiryat Ata (-2017), and has been named Elitzur Kiryat Ata since 2017.

The team was Israeli National League Champion in 2004 and 2022, and Israeli National League Regular Season Champion in 2015. It was Israeli Artzit League Champion in 2011.

== Current roster ==
Note: Flags indicate national team eligibility at FIBA-sanctioned events. Players may hold other non-FIBA nationalities not displayed.

Ironi Kiryat Ata roster
Players
Coaches

Pos.	No.	Nat.	Name	Ht.	Age
G	1	(United States)	Sibande, Nike (injured)	1.93 m (6 ft 4 in)	27 – 6 June 1999
G	4	(Israel)	Huli, Oz	1.94 m (6 ft 4 in)	24 – 7 August 2002
G/F	5	(Israel)	Levin, Yuval	2.02 m (6 ft 8 in)	23 – 21 September 2003
F	6	(Israel)	Sharon, Daniel	2.03 m (6 ft 8 in)	20 – 8 November 2005
F	7	(Israel)	Trushkin, Oren	2.00 m (6 ft 7 in)	18 – 6 January 2008
G	8	(Israel)	Cohen, Evyatar	1.94 m (6 ft 4 in)	20 – 13 August 2006
G	11	(United States)	Woods, Holland	1.82 m (6 ft 0 in)	27 – 13 November 1998
C	14	(Israel)	Filonenko, Maxim	2.08 m (6 ft 10 in)	20 – 14 December 2005
PG	15	(Israel)	Cohen, Jordan	1.88 m (6 ft 2 in)	29 – 31 July 1997
G	18	(Israel)	Asayag, Tomer (C)	1.92 m (6 ft 4 in)	27 – 9 June 1999
F	22	(Israel)	Movsowitz, Itay	2.02 m (6 ft 8 in)	19 – 12 March 2007
F	23	(United States)	Green, David	2.01 m (6 ft 7 in)	24 – 27 March 2002
G	24	(Israel)	Dandiker, Ron	1.88 m (6 ft 2 in)	19 – 2 March 2007
C	35	(United States)	Medley-Bacon, Brendan	2.15 m (7 ft 1 in)	26 – 27 June 2000
G	–	(United States)	Radford, Tyrece	1.88 m (6 ft 2 in)	27 – 22 April 1999

Head coach

- (Israel) Eldad Bentov

Assistant coach(es)

- (Israel) Amit Rahmilevich
- (Israel) Ohad Zohar

Legend

- (C) Team captain
- Injured

- Roster
Updated: September 25, 2026

=== Depth chart ===
Pos.	Starting 5	Bench 1	Bench 2
C	Brendan Medley-Bacon	Maxim Filonenko	Itay Movsowitz
PF	David Green	Daniel Sharon	Oren Trushkin
SF	Yuval Levin	Ron Dandiker	Oz Huli
SG	Holland Woods	Tyrece Radford	Evyatar Cohen
PG	Tomer Asayag	Jordan Cohen	Nike Sibande

- The Israeli league rule requires every team to have at least one Israeli on the court at any time.
- There should be maximum 5 foreigners on a 12-men game sheet.

== Notable players ==
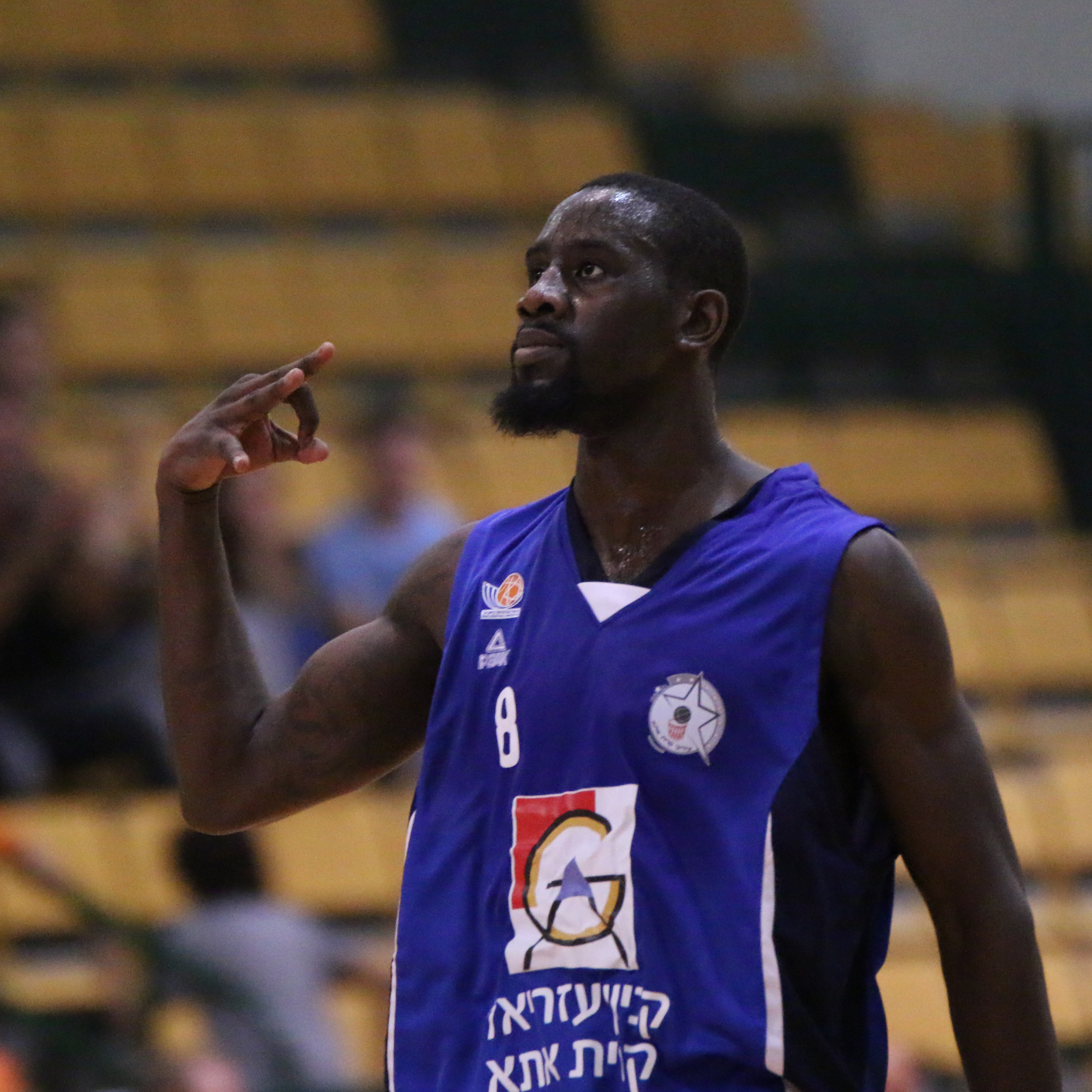
Sir'Dominic Pointer

- (United States) Jimmy Hall (born 1994)
- (United States) Sir'Dominic Pointer
- (United States) (Israel) Jerry Simon
