= Basketball in Israel =

In Israel, basketball is a popular sport, with a multi-tiered professional club league system, as well as men's and women's national teams.

== Professional league structure ==
Structure
Level	League											Cup
1	Israeli Basketball Premier League (Ligat Winner Sal); 14 teams											Israeli Basketball State Cup; Israeli Basketball League Cup
2	Liga Leumit (Liga Leumit Winner); 15 teams											Israeli Basketball Leumit Cup
3	Liga Artzit North 14 teams						Liga Artzit South 14 teams					Israel Basketball Association Cup
4	Liga Alef North 12 teams			Liga Alef Sharon 11 teams		Liga Alef Dan 12 teams			Liga Alef Center 11 teams		Liga Alef South 10 teams	Israel Basketball Association Cup
5	Liga Bet Valleys 10 teams	Liga Bet Haifa 9 teams	Liga Bet Samaria 10 teams	Liga Bet Sharon 12 teams	Liga Bet Petah Tikva 11 teams	Liga Bet Tel Aviv 10 teams	Liga Bet Dan 10 teams	Liga Bet Center 11 teams	Liga Bet Jerusalem 9 teams	Liga Bet South 9 teams	Liga Alef Negev 9 teams	Liga Bet Israel Basketball Association Cup

=== Israeli Basketball Premier League ===
Ligat Ha'Al or the Israeli Premier League, is the top tier level league of basketball competition in Israel, making it Israel's primary basketball competition. Ligat HaAl comprises the top twelve basketball clubs, and was founded in 1954.

=== Liga Leumit ===
Liga Leumit is the second tier level league of basketball competition. The regular season be played in a 28 rounds (14 round-robin format). The winner will be promoted to the Premier League, while the 2nd to 9th ranked teams will advance to the playoff to determine the second team that will be promoted also. and the 10th to 16th ranked teams will advance to the Playout Group, the last three teams will be relegated to the Liga Artzit.

=== Liga Artzit ===
Liga Artzit is the third tier level league of basketball competition. The league contains 28 clubs (in two districts of 14 teams each one), which compete in a home-and-away round-robin. At the end of the season, the top eight clubs advance to the play-offs. The winning club from each district (South/North) will be promoted to Liga Leumit . all the round is played on a best-of-three basis . The three teams that finish at the bottom of the table are relegated to Liga Alef.

=== Liga Alef ===
Liga Alef is the fourth tier in Israeli Basketball.

=== Liga Bet ===
Liga Bet is the fifth and lowest level tier in Israeli Basketball.

== State Cups ==
=== Israeli Basketball State Cup ===
The Israeli Basketball State Cup is the second most important basketball competition in Israel, after Ligat HaAl. The tournament began in 1956, and is run by the IBA. The tournament format consists rounds each consisting of one game elimination matches.

Maccabi Tel Aviv has won the most tournaments, having won 45, last winning the contest in the 2020–21 season.

=== Israeli Basketball National League Cup ===
The tournament cup for teams from the second division. tournament held since 2021.

=== Israeli Basketball League Cup ===
The Israeli Basketball League Cup is a pre-season basketball tournament held since 2006. It is held the week before the Ligat HaAl season.

== Men's team title holders ==
Season (L, C, LC)	Champions	State Cup	League Cup
2026–27 (L, C, LC)			Maccabi Tel Aviv
2025–26 (L, C, LC)	Maccabi Tel Aviv	Maccabi Tel Aviv	Hapoel Jerusalem
2024–25 (L, C, LC)	No Champion	Maccabi Tel Aviv	Maccabi Tel Aviv
2023–24 (L, C, LC)	Maccabi Tel Aviv	Hapoel Jerusalem	Hapoel Jerusalem
2022–23 (L, C, LC)	Maccabi Tel Aviv	Hapoel Jerusalem	Maccabi Tel Aviv
2021–22 (L, C, LC)	Hapoel Holon	Bnei Herzliya	Maccabi Tel Aviv
2020–21 (L, C, LC)	Maccabi Tel Aviv	Maccabi Tel Aviv	Maccabi Tel Aviv
2019–20 (L, C, LC)	Maccabi Tel Aviv	Hapoel Jerusalem	Hapoel Jerusalem
2018–19 (L, C, LC)	Maccabi Tel Aviv	Hapoel Jerusalem	Maccabi Rishon LeZion
2017–18 (L, C, LC)	Maccabi Tel Aviv	Hapoel Holon	Maccabi Tel Aviv
2016–17 (L, C, LC)	Hapoel Jerusalem	Maccabi Tel Aviv	Hapoel Jerusalem
2015–16 (L, C, LC)	Maccabi Rishon LeZion	Maccabi Tel Aviv	Maccabi Tel Aviv
2014–15 (L, C, LC)	Hapoel Jerusalem	Maccabi Tel Aviv	Hapoel Jerusalem
2013–14 (L, C, LC)	Maccabi Tel Aviv	Maccabi Tel Aviv	Maccabi Tel Aviv
2012–13 (L, C, LC)	Maccabi Haifa	Maccabi Tel Aviv	Maccabi Tel Aviv
2011–12 (L, C, LC)	Maccabi Tel Aviv	Maccabi Tel Aviv	Maccabi Tel Aviv
2010–11 (L, C, LC)	Maccabi Tel Aviv	Maccabi Tel Aviv	Maccabi Tel Aviv
2009–10 (L, C, LC)	Hapoel Gilboa Galil	Maccabi Tel Aviv	Hapoel Jerusalem
2008–09 (L, C, LC)	Maccabi Tel Aviv	Hapoel Holon	Hapoel Jerusalem
2007–08 (L, C, LC)	Hapoel Holon	Hapoel Jerusalem	Maccabi Tel Aviv
2006–07 (L, C, LC)	Maccabi Tel Aviv	Hapoel Jerusalem	Ironi Ashkelon
2005–06 (L, C)	Maccabi Tel Aviv	Maccabi Tel Aviv	
2004–05 (L, C)	Maccabi Tel Aviv	Maccabi Tel Aviv	
2003–04 (L, C)	Maccabi Tel Aviv	Maccabi Tel Aviv	
2002–03 (L, C)	Maccabi Tel Aviv	Maccabi Tel Aviv	
2001–02 (L, C)	Maccabi Tel Aviv	Maccabi Tel Aviv	
2000–01 (L, C)	Maccabi Tel Aviv	Maccabi Tel Aviv	
1999–2000 (L, C)	Maccabi Tel Aviv	Maccabi Tel Aviv	
1998–99 (L, C)	Maccabi Tel Aviv	Maccabi Tel Aviv	
1997–98 (L, C)	Maccabi Tel Aviv	Maccabi Tel Aviv	
1996–97 (L, C)	Maccabi Tel Aviv	Hapoel Jerusalem	
1995–96 (L, C)	Maccabi Tel Aviv	Hapoel Jerusalem	
1994–95 (L, C)	Maccabi Tel Aviv	Bnei Herzliya	
1993–94 (L, C)	Maccabi Tel Aviv	Maccabi Tel Aviv	
1992–93 (L, C)	Hapoel Galil Elyon	Hapoel Tel Aviv	
1991–92 (L, C)	Maccabi Tel Aviv	Hapoel Galil Elyon	
1990–91 (L, C)	Maccabi Tel Aviv	Maccabi Tel Aviv	
1989–90 (L, C)	Maccabi Tel Aviv	Maccabi Tel Aviv	
1988–89 (L, C)	Maccabi Tel Aviv	Maccabi Tel Aviv	
1987–88 (L, C)	Maccabi Tel Aviv	Hapoel Galil Elyon	
1986–87 (L, C)	Maccabi Tel Aviv	Maccabi Tel Aviv	
1985–86 (L, C)	Maccabi Tel Aviv	Maccabi Tel Aviv	
1984–85 (L, C)	Maccabi Tel Aviv	Maccabi Tel Aviv	
1983–84 (L, C)	Maccabi Tel Aviv	Hapoel Tel Aviv	
1982–83 (L, C)	Maccabi Tel Aviv	Maccabi Tel Aviv	
1981–82 (L, C)	Maccabi Tel Aviv	Maccabi Tel Aviv	
1980–81 (L, C)	Maccabi Tel Aviv	Maccabi Tel Aviv	
1979–80 (L, C)	Maccabi Tel Aviv	Maccabi Tel Aviv	
1978–79 (L, C)	Maccabi Tel Aviv	Maccabi Tel Aviv	
1977–78 (L, C)	Maccabi Tel Aviv	Maccabi Tel Aviv	
1976–77 (L, C)	Maccabi Tel Aviv	Maccabi Tel Aviv	
1975–76 (L, C)	Maccabi Tel Aviv	Hapoel Gvat/Yagur	
1974–75 (L, C)	Maccabi Tel Aviv	Maccabi Tel Aviv	
1973–74 (L, C)	Maccabi Tel Aviv		
1972–73 (L, C)	Maccabi Tel Aviv	Maccabi Tel Aviv	
1971–72 (L, C)	Maccabi Tel Aviv	Maccabi Tel Aviv	
1970–71 (L, C)	Maccabi Tel Aviv	Maccabi Tel Aviv	
1969–70 (L, C)	Maccabi Tel Aviv	Maccabi Tel Aviv	
1968–69 (L, C)	Hapoel Tel Aviv	Hapoel Tel Aviv	
1967–68 (L, C)	Maccabi Tel Aviv		
1966–67 (L, C)	Maccabi Tel Aviv		
1965–66 (L, C)	Hapoel Tel Aviv	Maccabi Tel Aviv	
1964–65 (L, C)	Hapoel Tel Aviv	Maccabi Tel Aviv	
1963–64 (L, C)	Maccabi Tel Aviv	Maccabi Tel Aviv	
1962–63 (L, C)	Maccabi Tel Aviv	Maccabi Tel Aviv	
1961–62 (L, C)	Maccabi Tel Aviv	Hapoel Tel Aviv	
1960–61 (L, C)	Hapoel Tel Aviv	Maccabi Tel Aviv	
1959–60 (L, C)	Hapoel Tel Aviv		
1958–59 (L, C)	Maccabi Tel Aviv	Maccabi Tel Aviv	
1957–58 (L, C)	Maccabi Tel Aviv	Maccabi Tel Aviv	
1956–57 (L, C)	Maccabi Tel Aviv		
1955–56 (L, C)		Maccabi Tel Aviv	
1954–55 (L, C)	Maccabi Tel Aviv		
1953–54 (L, C)	Maccabi Tel Aviv		

Legend
Won all 3 titles in the same year
Won 2 titles in the same year

== Israel national basketball teams ==
The combined Men's and Women's basket team is ranked 55th in the world, and 23rd in the Europe.

=== Men's ===
The Israel national basketball team is a men's basketball team that represents Israel in international competitions.

The Israeli team has participated 28 times in the European championship tournament. Their best achievements were a silver medal in 1979, and 5th place in 1953 and 1977. Israel is currently ranked 37th in the world by FIBA, and 14th in Europe (July 2014). Israel will also be the host nation of the competition in 2017.

=== Women's ===
The Israel women's national basketball team is a women's basketball team that represents Israel in international competitions.

The women's team is ranked 36th in the world, and 16th in Europe. (July 2014)

They have competed in the EuroBasket Women's tournament 6 times, but have won no metals. Their highest ever finish was 8th place in 1991.

=== All-time participation table ===
Combined table of men's and women's basketball teams, both senior and youth teams. Not included two discontinued competitions: Men's U-21 World Championship (three participations in four editions) and Women's U-21 World Championship for Women (one participation in two editions). Not included either, Mediterranean Games.

	Men's national teams									Women's national teams								
	Europe U-16	World U-17	Europe U-18	World U-19	Europe U-20	Euro Basket	World Cup	Olympics		Olympics	World Cup	Euro Basket	Europe U-20	World U-19	Europe U-18	World U-17	Europe U-16	
2027	Q		Q	DNQ	Q		TBD		2027			TBD	Q	DNQ	Q		Q	2027
2026	13	DNQ	7		10				2026		DNQ		2		1	DNQ	13	2026
2025	13		10	7	6	14			2025			DNQ	6	10	16		11	2025
2024	6	DNQ	4		10			DNQ	2024	DNQ			9		4	DNQ	12	2024
2023	13		6	DNQ	2		DNQ		2023			16	7	DNQ	12		12	2023
2022	5	DNQ	8		4	17			2022		DNQ		3		13	DNQ	3	2022
2021				DNQ				DNQ	2021	DNQ				DNQ				2021
2020									2020									2020
2019	11		1	DNQ	1		DNQ		2019			DNQ	5	DNQ	11		11	2019
2018	10	DNQ	9		1				2018		DNQ		6		3	DNQ	5	2018
2017	11		4	DNQ	2	21			2017			DNQ	7	DNQ	7		9	2017
2016	2	DNQ	15		12			DNQ	2016	DNQ			10		14	DNQ	4	2016
2015	15		2	DNQ	10	10			2015			DNQ		DNQ	12		9	2015
2014	2	DNQ	6		7		DNQ		2014		DNQ				3	DNQ	12	2014
2013	9		5	DNQ	15	21			2013			DNQ	6	DNQ	14		6	2013
2012	6	DNQ	7		3			DNQ	2012	DNQ			6		13	DNQ	9	2012
2011	4		7	DNQ	11	13			2011			13	5	DNQ	8		13	2011
2010	15	DNQ	4		5		DNQ		2010		DNQ		6		12	DNQ	10	2010
2009	13		15	DNQ	15	15			2009			13	8	DNQ	4		13	2009
2008	11		10		10			DNQ	2008	DNQ			8		12		17	2008
2007	11		11	DNQ	6	11			2007			13	15	DNQ	6		4	2007
2006	7		11		12		DNQ		2006		DNQ		14		7		10	2006
2005	9		7			9			2005			DNQ	1	DNQ	10		9	2005
2004	11		8		2			DNQ	2004	DNQ			DNQ		9		3	2004
2003	10			DNQ		7			2003			12					DNQ	2003
2002			6		10		DNQ		2002		DNQ		DNQ		DNQ			2002
2001	9					10			2001			DNQ		DNQ			DNQ	2001
2000			10		2			DNQ	2000	DNQ			DNQ		DNQ			2000
1999	DNQ			DNQ		9			1999			DNQ					DNQ	1999
1998			6		10		DNQ		1998		DNQ				DNQ			1998
1997	3					9			1997			DNQ		DNQ			DNQ	1997
1996			DNQ		9			DNQ	1996	DNQ					DNQ			1996
1995	8			DNQ		9			1995			DNQ					DNQ	1995
1994			10		5		DNQ		1994		DNQ				DNQ			1994
1993	8					15			1993			DNQ		DNQ			DNQ	1993
1992			5		4			DNQ	1992	DNQ					DNQ			1992
1991	6			DNQ		DNQ			1991			8					DNQ	1991
1990			DNQ				DNQ		1990		DNQ				DNQ			1990
1989	7					DNQ			1989			DNE		DNQ			DNQ	1989
1988			10					DNQ	1988	DNQ					10			1988
1987	9			DNQ		11			1987			DNE					DNQ	1987
1986			DNC				7		1986		DNQ				DNQ			1986
1985	7					9			1985			DNE		DNQ			DNQ	1985
1984			DNC					DNQ	1984	DNQ					DNQ		DNQ	1984
1983	DNQ			DNQ		6			1983		DNQ	DNE			DNQ			1983
1982			9				DNQ		1982								11	1982
1981	8					6			1981			DNE			DNQ			1981
1980			7					DNQ	1980	DNQ		DNE					DNQ	1980
1979	DNQ			DNQ		2			1979		DNQ				DNQ			1979
1978			DNC				DNQ		1978			DNE					13	1978
1977	11					5			1977						12			1977
1976			8					DNQ	1976	DNQ		DNE					11	1976
1975	11					7			1975		DNQ				9			1975
1974			11				DNQ		1974			DNE						1974
1973	6					7			1973						9			1973
1972			4					DNQ	1972			DNE						1972
1971	6					11			1971		DNQ				8			1971
1970			DNC				DNQ		1970			DNE						1970
1969						11			1969						8			1969
1968			7					DNQ	1968			DNE						1968
1967						8	DNQ		1967		DNQ				10			1967
1966			DNC						1966			DNE						1966
1965						6			1965						DNQ			1965
1964			DNC					DNQ	1964		DNQ	DNE						1964
1963						9	DNQ		1963									1963
1962									1962			DNE						1962
1961						11			1961									1961
1960								DNQ	1960			DNE						1960
1959						11	DNE		1959		DNQ							1959
1958									1958			DNE						1958
1957						DNE			1957		DNQ							1957
1956								DNQ	1956			DNE						1956
1955						DNE			1955									1955
1954							8		1954			DNE						1954
1953						5			1953		DNQ							1953
1952								20	1952			DNE						1952
1951									1951									1951
1950							DNQ		1950			11						1950
	Europe U-16	World U-17	Europe U-18	World U-19	Europe U-20	Euro Basket	World Cup	Olympics		Olympics	World Cup	Euro Basket	Europe U-20	World U-19	Europe U-18	World U-17	Europe U-16	
	Men's national teams									Women's national teams								

Legend
Champion
Runner-up
3rd place
Promoted to Division A
Demoted to Division B
In Division B
DNQ	Did not qualify
DNE	Did Not Enter
DNC	Did not compete

== Arenas ==
There are seven main and big basketball arenas in Israel which are:

- Ashkelon Sports Arena
- Conch Arena
- Drive in Arena
- Holon Toto Hall
- Menora Mivtachim Arena
- Pais Arena Jerusalem
- Romema Arena

== Israel Basketball Association ==
The IBA is the official governing body of basketball in Israel. The organization oversees every aspect of the sport including:

- Team and player registration,
- League rules,
- Issuing league schedules
- Certifying match results
- Referees and Statisticians certification, and
- The National team.

The IBA also handles associating with international bodies such as FIBA and Euroleague Basketball (company) (who organizes the Euroleague).

== NBA connections ==
=== Amare Stoudemire ===
Amare Stoudemire, from the National Basketball Association, best known for his time with the Phoenix Suns and New York Knicks, in the summer of 2013, became a major shareholder of Hapoel Jerusalem Basketball Club together with sports agent Arn Tellem and Ori Allon. The team moved into its new home, the Jerusalem Arena, in August 2014. Stoudemire, in the summer of 2014 was scheduled to conduct his first camp in Israel, in Tel Aviv. Due to Operation Protective Edge he canceled the camp on 14 July. He ended up playing for Jerusalem and Maccabi Tel Aviv.

=== NBA/WNBA players from Israel ===
Omri Casspi played for seven different teams over a ten-year NBA career. He was drafted 23rd overall in the 2009 NBA draft, making him the first Israeli to be selected in the first round of an NBA draft.

Gal Mekel, returned to Israel in 2016 after previously playing for the Dallas Mavericks and New Orleans Pelicans. He previously played college basketball for two years at Wichita State.

Deni Avdija currently plays for the Portland Trail Blazers.

Shay Doron, in 2007 played for the New York Liberty.

== See also ==
- Sport in Israel
- Baseball in Israel
- Ice hockey in Israel
- American Football in Israel
