= 2022 Israeli Basketball League Cup =

Israeli basketball pre-season tournament

Tournament details
- Country: Israel
- City: Hadera
- Venue: Innerbox
- Dates: 19 September–23 October 2022
- Teams: 11
- Defending champions: Maccabi Tel Aviv

Final positions
- Champions: Maccabi Tel Aviv
- Runners-up: Hapoel Tel Aviv
- Semifinalists: Hapoel Jerusalem; Hapoel Holon

Tournament statistics
- Matches played: 10

Awards
- MVP: (United States) (Ivory Coast) Alex Poythress
- All statistics correct as of 7 August 2022.

The 2022 Israeli Basketball League Cup, for sponsorships reasons the Winner League Cup, is the 17th edition of the pre-season tournament of the Israeli Basketball Premier League. Eleven Israeli Premier League team's will participate except from Hapoel Haifa that will play in the FIBA Europe Cup Qualification in those days.

== Bracket ==
First Round; 19-20 September
20 September, 19:45
Hapoel Gilboa Galil	81
Hapoel Be'er Sheva	71
20 September, 20:00
Hapoel Eilat	76
Ironi Ness Ziona	73
19 September, 19:00
Hapoel Tel Aviv	107
Ironi Kiryat Ata	69

Quarterfinals; 21-27 September
27 September, 21:00
Maccabi Tel Aviv	85
Hapoel Gilboa Galil	75
21 September, 19:40
Hapoel Holon	91
Hapoel Galil Elyon	79
23 September, 14:00
Hapoel Jerusalem	82
Hapoel Eilat	74
24 September, 19:45
Bnei Herzliya	78
Hapoel Tel Aviv	92

Semifinals; 28-29 September
29 September, 21:00
Maccabi Tel Aviv	97
Hapoel Holon	91
28 September, 20:30
Hapoel Jerusalem	71
Hapoel Tel Aviv	76

Final; 23 October
23 October, 19:00
Maccabi Tel Aviv	88
Hapoel Tel Aviv	84

== First round ==
19 September	Hapoel Tel Aviv	107–69	Ironi Kiryat Ata	Tel Aviv
20:00	Scoring by quarter: 33–19, 28–23, 27–15, 19–12
5 PLUS	Pts: Ginat 16; Rebs: Ginat 8 Asts: Munford & Brown 5 PIR: Ginat 24	Boxscore	Pts: Lewis 19; Rebs: Mashour 8 Asts: Four players 2 PIR: Hanochi 11	Arena: Drive in Arena; Attendance: 3,000; Referees: Erez Gurion, Kfir Mualem, David Izmirli

20 September	Hapoel Gilboa Galil	81–71	Hapoel Be'er Sheva	Gan Ner
19:45	Scoring by quarter: 24–14, 16–22, 13–21, 28–14
5 SPORT	Pts: Ben Moshe 22; Rebs: Odomes 10; Asts: Odomes 5 PIR: Ben Moshe 32	Boxscore	Pts: Moore 16; Rebs: Moore 8 Asts: Szuchman 4 PIR: Moore 21	Arena: Gan Ner Sports Hall; Attendance: 890; Referees: Ofer Manheim, Nir Meirson, Harel Kidron

20 September	Hapoel Eilat	76–73	Ironi Ness Ziona	Eilat
19:00	Scoring by quarter: 20–15, 13–16, 18–24, 25–18
5 LIVE	Pts: Terrell 19; Rebs: Griffin & Grimes 10; Asts: Terrell & Avivi 4 PIR: Griffin 23	Boxscore	Pts: Bey 24; Rebs: Bey & Cooper 8 Asts: Cooper 12; PIR: Bey 29	Arena: Begin Arena; Attendance: 400; Referees: Elad Leibovich, Lior Beynish, Or Zrur

== Quarterfinals ==
21 September	Hapoel Holon	91–79	Hapoel Galil Elyon	Hadera
19:40	Scoring by quarter: 30–23, 20–22, 31–19, 10–15
5 PLUS	Pts: Ragland & Johnson 16; Rebs: Jones 10; Asts: Ragland 12; PIR: Jones 31	Boxscore	Pts: Booker 21; Rebs: Hudson & Washington 8 Asts: Three players 5 PIR: Hudson 23	Arena: Innerbox; Attendance: 1,000; Referees: Amit Balak, Noam Gordon, Nir Keren

23 September	Hapoel Jerusalem	82–74	Hapoel Eilat	Hadera
14:00	Scoring by quarter: 18–22, 18–14, 18–19, 28–19
5 SPORT	Pts: Carrington 27; Rebs: Randolph 6 Asts: Smith 10; PIR: Carrington 30	Boxscore	Pts: Griffin 19; Rebs: Griffin 7 Asts: Gershon 4 PIR: Griffin 17	Arena: Innerbox; Attendance: 1,200; Referees: Kfir Mualem, Zahi Habdali, Eran Shmuel

24 September	Bnei Herzliya	78–92	Hapoel Tel Aviv	Hadera
19:45	Scoring by quarter: 20–18, 24–28, 20–23, 14–23
5 STARS	Pts: Kemp 21; Rebs: Kemp 8 Asts: Kravitz 4 PIR: Kemp 29	Boxscore	Pts: Brown 19; Rebs: Brown 8 Asts: Brown 9 PIR: Brown 27	Arena: Innerbox; Attendance: 1,700; Referees: Omer Esteron, Ofer Manheim, Ori Shalhavi

27 September	Maccabi Tel Aviv	85–75	Hapoel Gilboa Galil	Hadera
21:00	Scoring by quarter: 20–20, 19–19, 25–20, 21–16
5 LIVE	Pts: Colson 16; Rebs: Martin 6 Asts: Baldwin 6 PIR: Baldwin & DiBartolomeo 20	Boxscore	Pts: Odomes 23; Rebs: Gorham 9 Asts: Perkins 5 PIR: Odomes & Gorham 24	Arena: Innerbox; Attendance: 2,000; Referees: Adar Pe'er, Guy Shmueli, Pini Rimon

== Semifinals ==
28 September	Hapoel Jerusalem	71–76	Hapoel Tel Aviv	Hadera
20:30	Scoring by quarter: 15–25, 21–12, 14–18, 21–21
5 PLUS	Pts: Carrington 27; Rebs: Hankins 14; Asts: Smith 4 PIR: Carrington 29	Boxscore	Pts: Ginat 19; Rebs: Ginat 10; Asts: Timor 4 PIR: Ginat 31	Arena: Innerbox; Attendance: 2,000; Referees: Erez Gurion, David Romano, Elad Leibovich

29 September	Maccabi Tel Aviv	97–91	Hapoel Holon	Hadera
21:00	Scoring by quarter: 27–19, 25–21, 27–21, 18–30
5 SPORT	Pts: Poythress 17; Rebs: Poythress 11; Asts: Brown 12; PIR: Poythress 26	Boxscore	Pts: Ragland 24; Rebs: Jones 5 Asts: Ragland 8 PIR: Ragland 27	Arena: Innerbox; Attendance: 2,500; Referees: Sefi Shemesh, Nir Meirson, Noam Gordon

== Final ==
23 October	Maccabi Tel Aviv	88–84(OT)	Hapoel Tel Aviv	Hadera
19:00	Scoring by quarter: 24–16, 23–20, 15–17, 11–20, Overtime: 15–11
5 SPORT	Pts: Poythress 24; Rebs: Sorkin 8 Asts: Brown 9 PIR: Poythress 28	Boxscore	Pts: Munford 23; Rebs: Horton 7 Asts: Tokoto 5 PIR: McRae 19	Arena: Innerbox; Attendance: 2,540; Referees: Sefi Shemesh, Ofer Manheim, Noam Gordon

Starters:			Pts	Reb	Ast
F/C	22	(United States) Alex Poythress	24	7	4
PG	4	(United States) Lorenzo Brown	20	2	9
G	5	(United States) Wade Baldwin IV	10	3	2
C	32	(United States) Josh Nebo	6	6	0
SF	8	(Israel) Rafi Menco	1	7	0
Reserves:					
C	9	(Israel) Roman Sorkin	12	8	4
F	50	(United States) Bonzie Colson	11	6	1
G	12	(Israel) John DiBartolomeo	4	2	1
F/C	15	(Israel) Jake Cohen	0	1	0
F	10	(Israel) Guy Pnini	0	0	0
Head coach:
(Israel) Oded Kattash

M. Tel Aviv	H. Tel Aviv

M. Tel Aviv	Statistics	H. Tel Aviv
26/46 (57%)	2 point field goals	21/45 (47%)
9/29 (31%)	3 point field goals	5/21 (24%)
9/12 (75%)	Free throws	27/41 (66%)
44	Rebounds	42
21	Assists	22
6	Steals	6
14	Turnovers	12
4	Blocks	2

Starters:			Pts	Reb	Ast
C	0	(United States) Chris Horton	9	7	0
F	1	(United States) JP Tokoto	0	2	5
G	10	(Israel) Bar Timor	10	3	4
PF	41	(Israel) Tomer Ginat	10	6	4
G/F	52	(United States) Jordan McRae	17	5	3
Reserves:					
SG	5	(United States) Xavier Munford	23	3	4
PG	6	(Israel) Gil Beni	0	1	0
G/F	11	(Israel) Adam Ariel	4	2	0
F/C	14	(France) Jaylen Hoard	6	6	0
C	20	(Israel) Idan Zalmanson	5	2	2
Head coach:
(Israel) Danny Franco

2022 League Cup Winners
Maccabi Tel Aviv
10^{th} title
