= 2023 Israeli Basketball State Cup =

Israeli Basketball State Cup season

Tournament details
- Country: Israel
- Dates: 14 January – 16 February 2023
- Teams: 8
- Defending champions: Bnei Herzliya

Final positions
- Champions: Hapoel Jerusalem
- Runners-up: Maccabi Tel Aviv
- Semifinalists: Hapoel Haifa; Ironi Ness Ziona

Tournament statistics
- Matches played: 7

Awards
- MVP: (United States) Speedy Smith
- All statistics correct as of 16 January 2023.

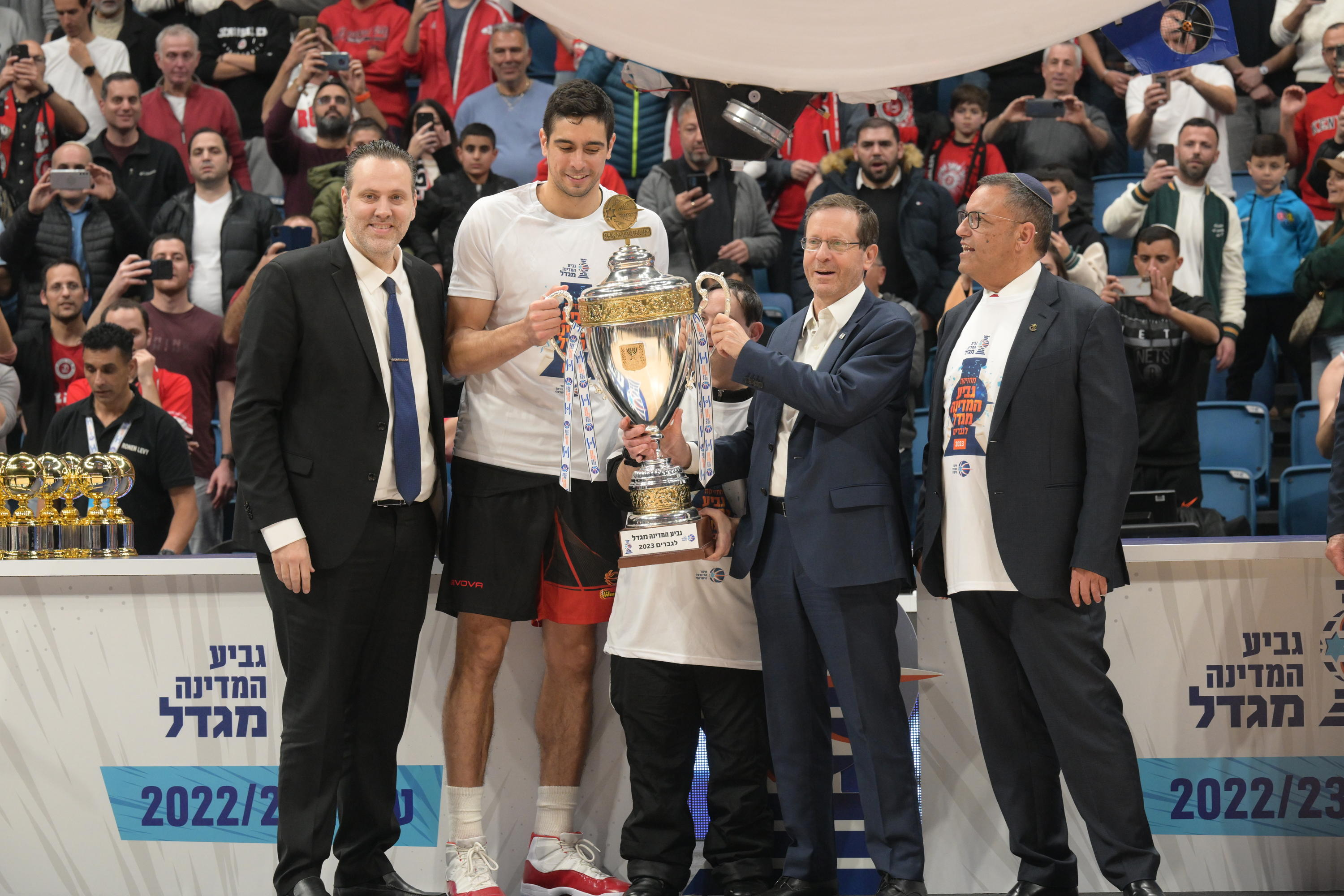
Isaac Herzog in Jerusalem, February 2023 (GPOABG 4369)

The 2023 Israeli Basketball State Cup, for sponsorships reasons the Migdal State Cup, was the 63rd edition of the Israeli Basketball State Cup, organized by the Israel Basketball Association.

On 3 January, 2023, the Israel Basketball Association held the draw for the Quarterfinals. The draw for the Semifinals held on 16 January, 2023.

== Qualified teams ==
The top eight ranking teams after the first rotation (11 rounds) of the 2022–23 Israeli Basketball Premier League regular season qualified to the tournament.

| Pos | Team | Pld | W | L | PF | PA | PD | PCT | Qualification |
|---|---|---|---|---|---|---|---|---|---|
| 1 | Maccabi Tel Aviv | 11 | 9 | 2 | 990 | 819 | +171 | .818 | qualified |
| 2 | Hapoel Tel Aviv | 11 | 9 | 2 | 1003 | 901 | +102 | .818 | qualified |
| 3 | Ironi Ness Ziona | 11 | 7 | 4 | 992 | 964 | +28 | .636 | qualified |
| 4 | Hapoel Holon | 11 | 7 | 4 | 953 | 931 | +22 | .636 | qualified |
| 5 | Hapoel Jerusalem | 11 | 6 | 5 | 838 | 809 | +29 | .545 | qualified |
| 6 | Bnei Herzliya | 11 | 5 | 6 | 936 | 900 | +36 | .455 | qualified |
| 7 | Hapoel Be'er Sheva | 11 | 5 | 6 | 914 | 963 | −49 | .455 | qualified |
| 8 | Hapoel Haifa | 11 | 5 | 6 | 853 | 915 | −62 | .455 | qualified |
| 9 | Ironi Kiryat Ata | 11 | 4 | 7 | 911 | 933 | −22 | .364 | |
| 10 | Hapoel Galil Elyon | 11 | 4 | 7 | 935 | 999 | −64 | .364 | |
| 11 | Hapoel Eilat | 11 | 3 | 8 | 859 | 975 | −116 | .273 | |
| 12 | Hapoel Gilboa Galil | 11 | 2 | 9 | 876 | 951 | −75 | .182 | |

== Bracket ==
Quarterfinals
16 January, 18:00
Maccabi Tel Aviv | 105
Bnei Herzliya | 89
14 January, 20:00
Hapoel Be'er Sheva | 79
Ironi Ness Ziona | 83
14 January, 19:20
Hapoel Holon | 78
Hapoel Haifa | 80
15 January, 21:00
Hapoel Tel Aviv | 67
Hapoel Jerusalem | 86

Semifinals
13 February, 18:00
Maccabi Tel Aviv | 85
Ironi Ness Ziona | 73
13 February, 20:45
Hapoel Haifa | 73
Hapoel Jerusalem | 77

Final
16 February, 20:45
Maccabi Tel Aviv | 61
Hapoel Jerusalem | 67

== Quarterfinals ==
| 14 January | Hapoel Holon | 78–80 | Hapoel Haifa | Holon |
| 19:20 | Scoring by quarter: 18–21, 17–21, 29–17, 14–21 |
| 5 SPORT | Pts: Ragland 19; Rebs: Johnson 7 Asts: Harris 6 PIR: Harris 20 | Boxscore | Pts: Hickey 24; Rebs: Upson 7 Asts: Hickey 8 PIR: Hickey 32 | Arena: Holon Toto Hall |

| 15 January | Hapoel Tel Aviv | 67–86 | Hapoel Jerusalem | Tel Aviv |
| 21:00 | Scoring by quarter: 12–23, 17–20, 18–22, 20–21 |
| 5 SPORT | Pts: Brown 18; Rebs: Three players 6 Asts: Munford 7 PIR: Brown 17 | Boxscore | Pts: Hankins 18; Rebs: Hankins 17; Asts: Smith 8 PIR: Hankins 33 | Arena: Drive in Arena |

| 16 January | Maccabi Tel Aviv | 105–89 | Bnei Herzliya | Tel Aviv |
| 18:00 | Scoring by quarter: 31–26, 28–18, 28–26, 18–19 |
| 5 SPORT | Pts: Brown & Menco 17; Rebs: Sorkin 9 Asts: Baldwin 6 PIR: Cohen 21 | Boxscore | Pts: Kemp 23; Rebs: Kemp 11; Asts: Three players 4 PIR: Kemp 33 | Arena: Menora Mivtachim Arena |

| 14 January | Hapoel Be'er Sheva | 79–83 | Ironi Ness Ziona | Be'er Sheva |
| 20:00 | Scoring by quarter: 17–21, 21–25, 17–22, 24–15 |
| 5 PLUS | Pts: Whittington 22; Rebs: Moore 9 Asts: Segal 7 PIR: Whittington 20 | Boxscore | Pts: Buchanan 22; Rebs: Bey 10; Asts: Cooper 10; PIR: Bey & Buchanan 23 | Arena: Conch Arena |

== Semifinals ==
| 13 February | Hapoel Haifa | 73–77 | Hapoel Jerusalem | Jerusalem |
| 20:45 | Scoring by quarter: 26–20, 15–20, 20–13, 12–24 |
| 5 PLUS | Pts: Hickey 22; Rebs: Tillman & Rayman 9 Asts: Allen 4 PIR: Hickey 25 | Boxscore | Pts: Hankins 23; Rebs: Hankins 10; Asts: Randolph & Smith 4 PIR: Hankins 38 | Arena: Pais Arena |

| 13 February | Maccabi Tel Aviv | 85–73 | Ironi Ness Ziona | Jerusalem |
| 18:00 | Scoring by quarter: 16–21, 26–15, 27–17, 16–10 |
| 5 SPORT | Pts: Brown 19; Rebs: Nebo 11; Asts: Brown 9 PIR: Nebo 31 | Boxscore | Pts: Cooper 16; Rebs: Bey 9 Asts: Cooper 12; PIR: Cooper & Meyinsse 20 | Arena: Pais Arena |

== Final ==
| 16 February | Maccabi Tel Aviv | 61–67 | Hapoel Jerusalem | Jerusalem |
| 20:45 | Scoring by quarter: 17–17, 14–23, 17–14, 13–13 |
| 5 SPORT | Pts: Brown & Colson 15; Rebs: Nebo 7 Asts: Brown & Baldwin 3 PIR: Brown 17 | Boxscore | Pts: Smith 16; Rebs: Randolph & Cornelius 5 Asts: Smith 9 PIR: Smith 16 | Arena: Pais Arena |

| Starters: | | | Pts | Reb | Ast |
|---|---|---|---|---|---|
| PG | 4 | (United States) Lorenzo Brown | 15 | 6 | 3 |
| G | 5 | (United States) Wade Baldwin IV | 10 | 2 | 3 |
| PF | 6 | (United States) Jarell Martin | 5 | 1 | 0 |
| SF | 8 | (Israel) Rafi Menco | 0 | 1 | 0 |
| C | 32 | (United States) Josh Nebo | 10 | 7 | 1 |
| Reserves: | | | | | |
| F | 50 | (United States) Bonzie Colson | 15 | 4 | 0 |
| G | 12 | (Israel) John DiBartolomeo | 5 | 2 | 1 |
| F/C | 9 | (Israel) Roman Sorkin | 1 | 2 | 1 |
| SF | 10 | (Israel) Guy Pnini | 0 | 1 | 0 |
| F/C | 15 | (Israel) Jake Cohen | DNP | | |
| SG | 18 | (Israel) Tomer Agmon | DNP | | |
| PG | 33 | (Israel) Yiftach Ziv | DNP | | |
Head coach:
(Israel) Oded Kattash

| M. Tel Aviv | H. Jerusalem |

| M. Tel Aviv | Statistics | H. Jerusalem |
|---|---|---|
| 19/38 (50.0%) | 2 point field goals | 14/27 (51.9%) |
| 4/18 (22.2%) | 3 point field goals | 6/26 (23.1%) |
| 11/19 (57.9%) | Free throws | 21/27 (77.8%) |
| 31 | Rebounds | 41 |
| 9 | Assists | 13 |
| 7 | Steals | 6 |
| 12 | Turnovers | 14 |
| 4 | Blocks | 4 |

| Starters: | | | Pts | Reb | Ast |
|---|---|---|---|---|---|
| PG | 4 | (United States) Speedy Smith | 16 | 3 | 9 |
| C | 35 | (United States) Zach Hankins | 10 | 4 | 0 |
| G/F | 2 | (United States) Levi Randolph | 11 | 5 | 1 |
| SF | 80 | (Israel) Or Cornelius | 5 | 5 | 1 |
| F/C | 5 | (Latvia) Mareks Mejeris | 3 | 3 | 0 |
| Reserves: | | | | | |
| SG | 0 | (Trinidad and Tobago) Khadeen Carrington | 10 | 4 | 1 |
| F | 24 | (Israel) Oz Blayzer | 12 | 2 | 0 |
| C | 6 | (Israel) Itay Segev | 0 | 4 | 0 |
| PG | 31 | (Israel) Noam Yaacov | 0 | 1 | 1 |
| PF | 3 | (Israel) T. J. Cline | DNP | | |
| SG | 23 | (Israel) Afek Amsalam | DNP | | |
| C | 77 | (Israel) Gilad Levy | DNP | | |
Head coach:
(Serbia) Aleksandar Džikić

2023 Israeli State Cup Winners
Hapoel Jerusalem
(7th title)
