= Matan Adelson =

American-Israeli businessman

Matan Adelson (born 1999) is an American-Israeli investor and businessman, who has been the majority owner of Hapoel Jerusalem B.C. since 2023. He is the youngest son of philanthropist Miriam and businessman Sheldon Adelson.

== Early life and education ==
Born in Los Angeles, California, in 1999, Adelson is the youngest son of Miriam and Sheldon Adelson. His older brother Adam is a racecar driver in the United States. He spent most of his childhood in Las Vegas, where he was immersed in the family's business and philanthropic activities. Matan later graduated from Stanford University with a degree in economics.

== Business activities ==
In 2021, Adelson moved to Israel.

On June 1, 2023, Adelson purchased a 90% stake of Hapoel Jerusalem B.C. for $20 million, with the remaining 10% held by the Hapoel fan association. Among his goals were to expand the brand internationally and enter the Euroleague, alongside Maccabi Tel Aviv. At 25, Adelson was the youngest owner of an Israeli sports team. Adelson brought on Alon Kremer as the team's new CEO and former Israeli NBA player Gal Mekel as a consultant and minority stakeholder.

In 2023, Matan was named alongside his mother Miriam Adelson as one of the 50 most influential Jews by the Jerusalem Post.

In October 2025, Bosnian media alleged that Adelson was instrumental in securing American sanctions relief for Bosnian Serb leader Milorad Dodik, owing to his close relationship with Dodik's son, Igor.
