= 2025 Israeli Basketball State Cup =

Israeli Basketball State Cup season

Tournament details
- Country: Israel
- Dates: 18 January – 13 February 2025
- Teams: 8
- Defending champions: Hapoel Jerusalem

Final positions
- Champions: Maccabi Tel Aviv
- Runners-up: Hapoel Jerusalem
- Semifinalists: Hapoel Tel Aviv; Bnei Herzliya

Tournament statistics
- Matches played: 7

Awards
- MVP: (Lithuania) Rokas Jokubaitis
- All statistics correct as of February 13, 2025.

The 2025 Israeli Basketball State Cup was the 65th edition of the Israeli Basketball State Cup, organized by the Israeli Basketball Association.

On 9 January, 2025, the Israel Basketball Association held the draw for the Quarterfinals.

== Qualified teams ==
The top eight ranking teams after the first rotation (13 rounds) of the 2024–25 Israeli Basketball Premier League regular season qualified to the tournament.

Pos	Team	Pld	W	L	PF	PA	PD	Pts	Qualification or relegation
1	Maccabi Tel Aviv	13	11	2	1146	1055	+91	24	Seeded at Quarterfinals
2	Hapoel Tel Aviv	13	12	1	1149	966	+183	24 (Note: The Disciplinary Court of the Israel Basketball Association partially imposed a suspended sentence against Hapoel Tel Aviv and deducted one point from its balance in the 2024/25 season, following the lighting of flares during the final series games in the 2023/24 season.)	Seeded at Quarterfinals
3	Hapoel Jerusalem	13	10	3	1123	972	+151	23	Seeded at Quarterfinals
4	Bnei Herzliya	13	9	4	1151	1152	−1	22	Seeded at Quarterfinals
5	Maccabi Ironi Ramat Gan	13	8	5	1156	1103	+53	21	Unseeded at Quarterfinals
6	Hapoel Holon	13	8	5	1074	1014	+60	21	Unseeded at Quarterfinals
7	Ironi Ness Ziona	13	6	7	1106	1113	−7	19	Unseeded at Quarterfinals
8	Hapoel Be'er Sheva/Dimona	13	5	8	1045	1103	−58	18	Unseeded at Quarterfinals
9	Hapoel Galil Elyon	13	5	8	975	1016	−41	18	
10	Hapoel Afula	13	5	8	1078	1063	+15	18	
11	Hapoel Gilboa Galil	13	4	9	1050	1082	−32	17	
12	Elitzur Netanya	13	3	10	989	1131	−142	16	
13	Ironi Kiryat Ata	13	3	10	1026	1131	−105	16	
14	Hapoel Haifa	13	2	11	1037	1204	−167	15	

Rules for classification:

== Bracket ==
Quarterfinals
20 January, 21:05
Maccabi Tel Aviv	78
Ironi Ness Ziona	63
19 January, 21:15
Hapoel Tel Aviv	86
Maccabi Ironi Ramat Gan	50
19 January, 18:50
Hapoel Be'er Sheva/Dimona	96
Hapoel Jerusalem	99
18 January, 20:40
Bnei Herzliya	84
Hapoel Holon	73

Semifinals
10 February, 21:15
Maccabi Tel Aviv	95
Hapoel Tel Aviv	93
9 February, 20:30
Hapoel Jerusalem	89
Bnei Herzliya	86

Final
13 February, 21:00
Maccabi Tel Aviv	87
Hapoel Jerusalem	72

== Quarterfinals ==
20 January	Maccabi Tel Aviv	78–63	Ironi Ness Ziona	Tel Aviv
21:05	Scoring by quarter: 26–13, 19–14, 15–14, 18–22
	Pts: Hoard 23; Rebs: Hoard 10; Asts: Blatt 7 PIR: Hoard 29	Boxscore	Pts: Lindo 14; Rebs: Meyinsse 9 Asts: Brown 5 PIR: Kravitz 17	Arena: Menora Mivtachim Arena; Referees: Ofer Manheim, Elad Leibovich, Omer Wasserman

18 January	Bnei Herzliya	84–73	Hapoel Holon	Herzliya
20:40	Scoring by quarter: 22–21, 20–19, 22–15, 20–18
	Pts: Clark 22; Rebs: Silva 10; Asts: Clark 7 PIR: Silva 28	Boxscore	Pts: Zalmanson 16; Rebs: Tucker 6 Asts: Ziv 5 PIR: Zalmanson 15	Arena: HaYovel Herzliya; Referees: Amit Balak, Zahi Habdali, Or Zrur

19 January	Hapoel Be'er Sheva/Dimona	96–99	Hapoel Jerusalem	Ashdod
18:50	Scoring by quarter: 24–25, 19–30, 27–12, 26–32
	Pts: McKoy 27; Rebs: McKoy 10; Asts: Weisz 8 PIR: McKoy 39	Boxscore	Pts: Carrington 20; Rebs: Zoosman 8 Asts: Five players 3 PIR: Carrington, Zoosman 23	Arena: hakirya High School; Referees: Omer Esteron, Nir Meirson, Dvir Rainisch

19 January	Hapoel Tel Aviv	86–50	Maccabi Ironi Ramat Gan	Tel Aviv
21:15	Scoring by quarter: 19–12, 22–11, 24–15, 21–12
	Pts: Blakeney 14; Rebs: Beverley 7 Asts: Timor 5 PIR: Beverley 18	Boxscore	Pts: McCullum 14; Rebs: Melamed 5 Asts: McCullum 4 PIR: McCullum 15	Arena: Menora Mivtachim Arena; Referees: Sefi Shemesh, Guy Shmueli, Adar Pe'er

== Semifinals ==
9 February	Hapoel Jerusalem	89–86	Bnei Herzliya	Jerusalem
20:30	Scoring by quarter: 20–25, 22–14, 23–25, 24–22
	Pts: Harper 24; Rebs: Wiley 10; Asts: Zoosman 4 PIR: Zoosman 28	Boxscore	Pts: Silva 21; Rebs: Silva 15; Asts: Clark 5 PIR: Silva 35	Arena: Pais Arena; Referees: Omer Esteron, Guy Shmueli, Noam Gordon

10 February	Maccabi Tel Aviv	95–93(OT)	Hapoel Tel Aviv	Jerusalem
21:15	Scoring by quarter: 27–25, 17–21, 21–20, 22–21, Overtime: 8–6
	Pts: Jokubaitis 27; Rebs: Sorkin, Randolph 8 Asts: Jokubaitis, Blatt 8 PIR: Jokubaitis 32	Boxscore	Pts: Madar 23; Rebs: Caboclo 7 Asts: Madar 8 PIR: Madar 27	Arena: Pais Arena

== Final ==
13 February	Maccabi Tel Aviv	87–72	Hapoel Jerusalem	Jerusalem
21:00	Scoring by quarter: 20–15, 16–15, 30–14, 21–28
	Pts: Jokubaitis 20; Rebs: Rivero 8 Asts: Jokubaitis 8 PIR: Randolph 25	Boxscore	Pts: Harper 23; Rebs: Wiley 10; Asts: Chachashvili, Johnson 3 PIR: Harper 14	Arena: Pais Arena; Referees: Amit Balak, Ofer Manheim, Harel Kidron

Starters:			Pts	Reb	Ast
PG	31	(Lithuania) Rokas Jokubaitis	20	4	8
G/F	20	(United States) Levi Randolph	19	5	3
F/C	14	(Cuba) Jasiel Rivero	13	8	2
PG	45	(Israel) Tamir Blatt	11	4	4
F/C	9	(Israel) Roman Sorkin	10	6	0
Reserves:					
PG	55	(United States) David DeJulius	8	2	1
C	50	(United States) Trevion Williams	6	4	1
G	12	(Israel) John DiBartolomeo	0	1	0
F	11	(Israel) Will Rayman	0	0	0
SF	8	(Israel) Rafi Menco	0	0	0
PG	10	(Israel) Omer Mayer	0	0	0
F/C	15	(Israel) Jake Cohen	DNP		
Head coach:
(Israel) Oded Kattash

M. Tel Aviv	H. Jerusalem

M. Tel Aviv	Statistics	H. Jerusalem
25/36 (69.4%)	2 point field goals	20/37 (24.1%)
10/25 (40.0%)	3 point field goals	4/27 (14.8%)
7/8 (87.5%)	Free throws	20/27 (74.1%)
37	Rebounds	32
21	Assists	12
6	Steals	7
14	Turnovers	10
3	Blocks	0

Starters:			Pts	Reb	Ast
PG	1	(United States) Jared Harper	23	2	2
SF	4	(United States) Chris Johnson	5	3	3
G/F	50	(Israel) Yovel Zoosman	5	0	2
G	22	(United Kingdom) Tarik Phillip	4	2	1
F/C	0	(United States) Justin Smith	4	0	0
Reserves:					
SG	3	(Trinidad and Tobago) Khadeen Carrington	11	4	1
C	7	(Israel) Gabriel Chachashvili	7	5	3
C	5	(United States) Austin Wiley	6	10	0
PG	8	(Israel) Noam Dovrat	4	2	0
G/F	80	(Israel) Or Cornelius	3	1	0
G/F	51	(Israel) Egor Koulechov	0	0	0
F	18	(Israel) Yarin Hasson	DNP		
Head coach:
(Israel) Yonatan Alon

2025 Israeli State Cup Winners
Maccabi Tel Aviv
(46th title)
