= Khadeen Carrington =

Israeli-Trinidadian-American basketball player (born 1995)

Khadeen Carrington קאדין קרינגטון
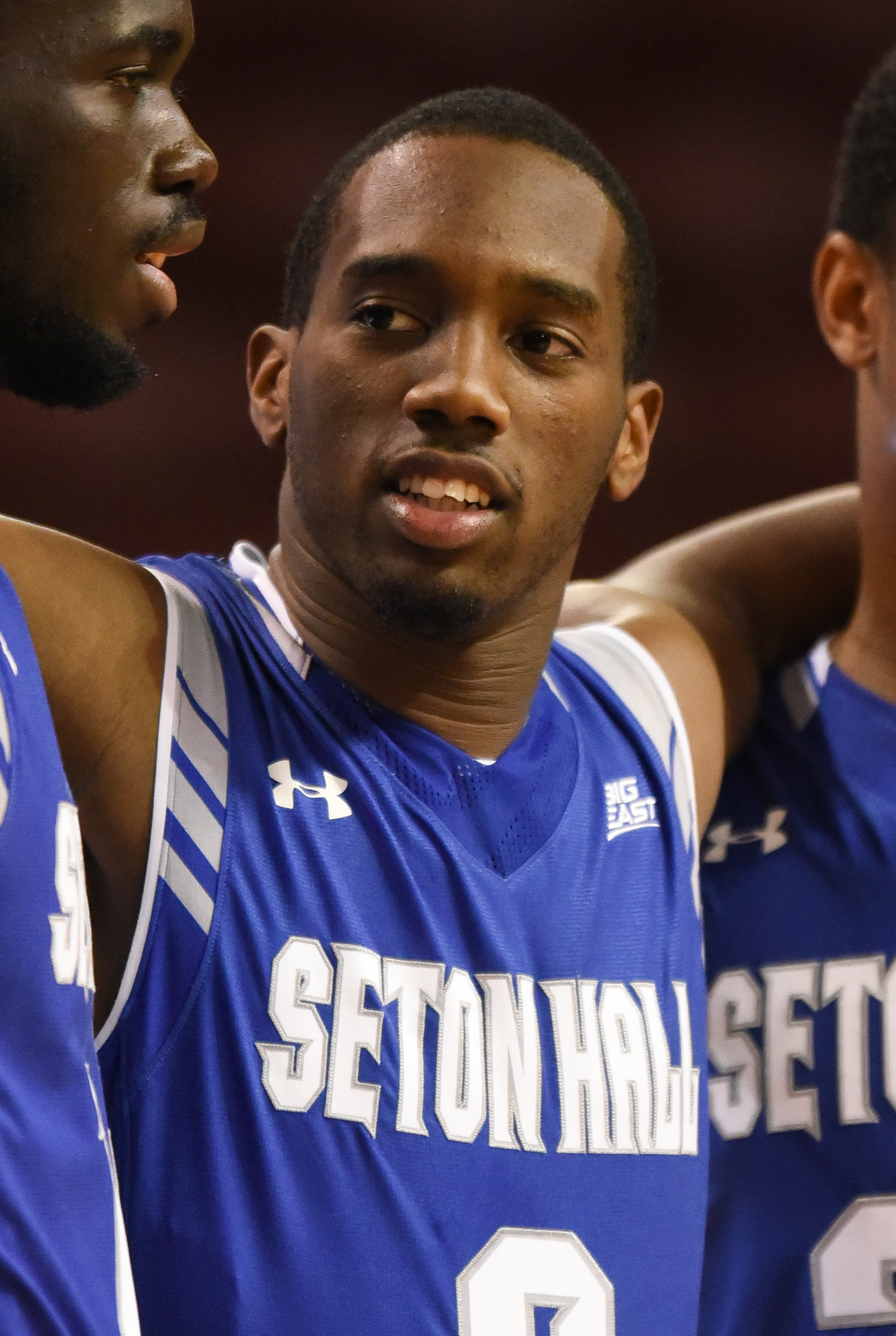
- Carrington with Seton Hall in 2015

No. 5 – Hapoel Tel Aviv
- Position: Point guard / shooting guard
- League: Israeli Premier League; EuroLeague

Personal information
- Born: October 3, 1995 (age 31) Trinidad and Tobago
- Listed height: 6 ft 4 in (1.93 m)
- Listed weight: 195 lb (88 kg)

Career information
- High school: Bishop Loughlin (Brooklyn, New York)
- College: Seton Hall (2014–2018)
- NBA draft: 2018: undrafted
- Playing career: 2018–present

Career history
- 2018: Mornar
- 2018–2019: Limburg United
- 2019–2020: Riesen Ludwigsburg
- 2020–2021: AS Monaco
- 2021: Real Betis
- 2021–2022: JDA Dijon
- 2022–2026: Hapoel Jerusalem
- 2026–present: Hapoel Tel Aviv

Career highlights
- EuroCup champion (2021); Israeli Cup winner (2023, 2024); Israeli League Cup winner (2023, 2025); Israeli Supercup winner (2025); Second-team All-Big East (2017)

Khadeen Akil Reynold Jr Carrington (Hebrew: קאדין קרינגטון; born October 3, 1995) is an Israeli-Trinidadian-American basketball player for Hapoel Tel Aviv of the Israeli Premier League and the EuroLeague. He also plays for the Israel men's national basketball team.

He played college basketball for the Seton Hall Pirates. The son of former professional soccer player and coach Reynold Carrington, he starred at Bishop Loughlin Memorial High School in Brooklyn, New York. As a senior, he led the Catholic High School Athletic Association (CHSAA)'s Class AA division in scoring with 24.2 points per game and was named the Brooklyn Boys' Player of the Year by the New York Daily News. Carrington was a highly sought-after recruit and received several college offers, but chose Seton Hall. As a junior at Seton Hall, he was named to the Second-team All-Big East and averaged 17.1 points per game. Carrington's scoring declined to 15.6 points per game as a senior but he led the Pirates to an NCAA Tournament win over NC State.

== Early life ==
Carrington is the son of Reynold Carrington, a former professional soccer player and coach from Trinidad and Tobago. His older brother Kariym played Division II basketball. Khadeen first started playing basketball at the age of eight. Carrington attended Bishop Loughlin Memorial High School and averaged 22.5 points per game as a sophomore to lead the team to the Catholic High School Athletic Association (CHSAA) Class AA intersectional quarterfinals. He was an All-City second team selection by the New York Post as a sophomore. Carrington competed in Amateur Athletic Union play with the New York Lightning.

As a junior, Carrington averaged 24.7 points per game and was a Daily News All-City first-team selection. He teamed with Mike Williams to lead Bishop Loughlin to a CHSAA 'AA' intersectional championship game.

Carrington led the CHSAA's Class AA division in scoring with 24.2 points per game as a senior and had one 42-point game. He was named the Brooklyn Boys' Player of the Year by the New York Daily News. Carrington was also named the CHSAA Player of the Year as he led the Lions to the Catholic Intersectional title game. He finished his career with 2,196 points — the most in school history. Carrington was ranked the 127th-best player in the Class of 2014 by Rivals.com. He received collegiate offers from Iowa State, Dayton, St. John's, Rutgers, Cincinnati, Pittsburgh, Providence, Iowa, West Virginia, South Carolina, DePaul and Hofstra. Eventually, he settled for Seton Hall, joining fellow Brooklyn product Isaiah Whitehead. He credited his commitment to feeling a connection with Seton Hall coach Kevin Willard and the staff.

== College career ==
As a freshman, Carrington started eight games but mostly played as a backup to Isaiah Whitehead. However, with Whitehead missing several games in January 2015 due to a foot injury, Carrington was able to demonstrate his potential, contributing 17 points in an overtime win against Villanova. Carrington posted 8.8 points and 2.9 rebounds per game in his freshman season. He had his first double-double in an 83–63 win over Marquette on December 30, 2015, with 17 points and 10 rebounds. Carrington scored 27 points in a Big East Tournament game against Creighton as a sophomore. He averaged 14.1 points (10th in the Big East) and 2.5 assists per game.

Carrington averaged 19.2 points per game during the 2016–17 non-conference season, but hit a slump in the early part of conference play due to increased defensive attention and a dislocated pinkie finger. He scored 41 points in an 87–81 win against Creighton on February 15, 2017, and had 10 points in the final minute. In the NCAA tournament loss against Arkansas, Carrington had 22 points and four turnovers. He was a Second Team All-Big East selection as a junior. Carrington averaged 17.1 points (6th in the Big East), 3.1 rebounds and 2.9 assists per game as a junior while shooting 42.4 percent from the field and 38.2 percent from three-point range. He tested the waters of the 2017 NBA draft but ultimately returned to Seton Hall.

Coming into his senior year, Carrington and Angel Delgado were named to the preseason All-Big East First Team. He made the switch to point guard over the summer by studying video with coach Kevin Willard and assistant Shaheen Holloway. On January 6, 2018, Carrington scored a season-high 29 points in a comeback win over Butler. He was Big East Player of the Week on February 26, after leading Seton Hall to a win against Providence by scoring 25 points. Carrington led the Pirates to their first NCAA tournament victory in 14 years as a senior, scoring 26 points to defeat NC State. He was named to the First Team All-Met after averaging 15.6 points and 4.4 assists (8th in the Big East) per game. “It sounds weird, but I really enjoyed the ups and downs,” Carrington said of his Seton Hall career. “The downs taught me a lot. It made me become a man. I learned a lot of things here in my four years, not only on the court but off the court — probably more off the court.” After the season Carrington was invited to the Portsmouth Invitational Tournament.

== Professional career ==
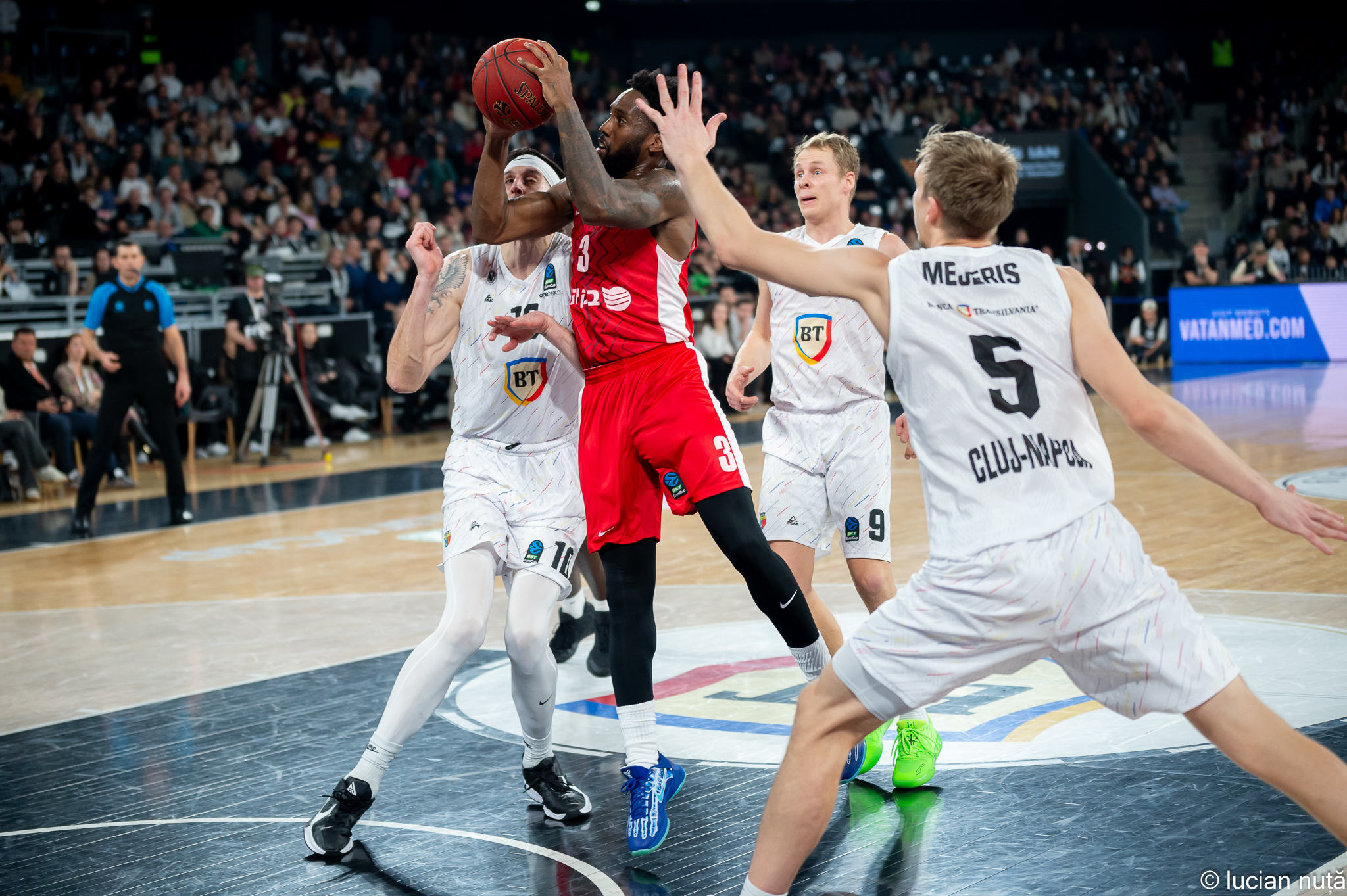
Carrington with Hapoel Jerusalem in 2025.

After going undrafted in the 2018 NBA draft, Carrington signed with the Detroit Pistons for the NBA Summer League. On July 21, 2018, he signed a contract with Montenegrin team Mornar.

Carrington then played for Limburg United of the Belgian league BNXT League. He averaged 14.1 points (6th in the league), 4.8 assists (2nd), and 3.6 rebounds per game, with an 85.1% free throw percentage.

On July 3, 2019, he signed with Riesen Ludwigsburg of the Basketball Bundesliga. He averaged 17.2 points (3rd in the league), 3.9 rebounds, and 3.3 assists per game for the team, while shooting 82.8% from the free throw line. His season-high 27 points came on October 20, against Ratiopharm Ulm.

On July 19, 2020, Carrington signed a two-year deal with TD Systems Baskonia of the Liga ACB and the EuroLeague. On September 11, 2020, Carrington was released because he was experiencing delays with the renewal of his Trinidadian passport due to the COVID-19 pandemic.

On September 15, 2020, he signed with AS Monaco of the LNB Pro A. On October 19, Carrington was ruled out for several months after tearing his ACL.

On August 5, 2021, he signed with Real Betis of the Liga ACB. Carrington averaged 6.9 points, 1.9 rebounds, 1.2 steals and 1.1 assists per game.

On November 15, he signed with JDA Dijon Basket of the LNB Pro A. He averaged 13.7 points per game, while shooting 87.4% from the free throw line.

On July 19, 2022, he signed with Hapoel Jerusalem of the Israeli Basketball Premier League. In 2022–23, he averaged 12.9 points per game. In 2023–34, he averaged 11.0 points per game, and shot 81.7% from the free throw line.

On July 13, 2026, Carrington signed a three-year deal with Hapoel Tel Aviv of the Israeli Premier League and the EuroLeague.

== National team ==
Carrington represents the Israeli national team in international competitions.
