= 2013 Israeli Basketball League Cup =

Israeli basketball pre-season tournament

Tournament details
- Arena: Beit Maccabi / Nokia Arena; Rishon LeZion / Tel Aviv
- Dates: 16–10 October 2013

Final positions
- Champions: Maccabi Tel Aviv (5th title)
- Runners-up: Hapoel Jerusalem

Awards and statistics
- MVP: (Israel) Sylven Landesberg

The 2013 Israeli Basketball League Cup is the 8th edition of the Israeli Basketball League Cup pre-season tournament. It plays between October 6 and October 10 at Bet Maccabi in Rishon LeZion and NOKIA Arena in Tel Aviv.

== Participants ==
As the format states, the top eight teams on the 2012–13 Israeli Super League qualified for the tournament. However, league champions Maccabi Haifa were at the time in the United States competing against clubs of the National Basketball Association (NBA) and were therefore replaced by ninth placed team Hapoel Holon.

== Tournament Bracket ==
Quarterfinals; October 6–7
1	Maccabi Tel Aviv	87
8	Hapoel Tel Aviv	73
3	Hapoel Eilat	79
6	Maccabi Rishon LeZion	69
2	Hapoel Holon	80
7	Gilboa/Galil	66
4	Barak Netanya	71
5	Hapoel Jerusalem	81

Semifinals; October 9
1	Maccabi Tel Aviv	85
3	Hapoel Eilat	65
2	Hapoel Holon	58
5	Hapoel Jerusalem	72

Final; October 10
1	Maccabi Tel Aviv	88
5	Hapoel Jerusalem	77
