= 2009–10 Israeli Basketball State Cup =

The 2009–10 Israeli Basketball State Cup was the 50th edition of the Israeli Basketball State Cup, organized by the Israel Basketball Association. 26 teams participated in the competition. The semifinals and finals was played at the Yad Eliyahu Arena in Tel Aviv.

== Preliminary round ==
4 Liga Leumit teams have been drawn to play a preliminary round to earn a spot in the main draw.

Home team	Score	Away team
Maccabi H'abika	88–73	Hapoel Kiryat Tiv'on
Hapoel Haifa	85–73	Elitzur Ramla

== Main draw ==
Following IBA's rules, the current champions, Maccabi Tel Aviv, and the cup holders, Hapoel Holon, have been drawn straight into the quarterfinals, into different halves of the draw. Two other random teams, Hapoel Jerusalem and Maccabi Haifa, have been drawn straight into the second round.

First round
Hapoel Yokneam\Megido	77
Hapoel Afula	93
Maccabi Hod HaSharon	80
Eliztur Kokhav Ya'ir	84
Elitzur Kiryat Ata	70
Ironi Ramat Gan	107
Maccabi H'abika	77
Hapoel Gilboa Galil Elyon	82
Hapoel Nazareth Illit	54
Elitzur Maccabi Netanya	91
Hapoel Jerusalem	Bye
Hapoel Be'eri	84
Maccabi Rishon LeZion	93
Maccabi Be'er Ya'akov	79
Ironi Nahariya	81
Elitzur Yavne	49
Bnei HaSharon	88
Maccabi Ashdod	92
Hapoel Lev hasharon	60
Hapoel Haifa	61
Ironi Ashkelon	102
Maccabi Haifa	Bye

Second round
Hapoel Afula	93
Eliztur Kokhav Ya'ir	85
Maccabi Tel Aviv	Bye
Ironi Ramat Gan	63
Hapoel Gilboa Galil Elyon	64
Elitzur Maccabi Netanya	77
Hapoel Jerusalem	76
Maccabi Rishon LeZion	83
Ironi Nahariya	85
Bnei HaSharon	96
Maccabi Ashdod	68
Hapoel Holon	Bye
Ironi Ashkelon	95
Maccabi Haifa	87

Quarterfinals
Hapoel Afula	81
Maccabi Tel Aviv	95
Hapoel Gilboa Galil Elyon	82
Elitzur Maccabi Netanya	92
Ironi Nahariya	71
Bnei HaSharon	76
Hapoel Holon	64
Ironi Ashkelon	71

Semifinals
Maccabi Tel Aviv	81
Elitzur Maccabi Netanya	65
Bnei HaSharon	69
Ironi Ashkelon	61

final
Maccabi Tel Aviv	77
Bnei HaSharon	70

== See also ==
- 2009–10 Israeli Basketball Super League
- Israeli Basketball State Cup
