= 2014–15 Israeli Basketball State Cup =

The 2014–15 Israeli Basketball State Cup was the 55th edition of the Israeli Basketball State Cup, organized by the Israel Basketball Association.

== First round ==
Home team	Score	Away team
Ironi Ramat Gan	82–86	Maccabi Haifa
Maccabi Hod HaSharon	75–76	Maccabi Ashdod
Ironi Ashkelon	0–20	Bnei Herzliya
Hapoel Afula	78-72	Elitzur Kiryat Ata
Elitzur Yavne	78-86	Barak Netanya
Hapoel Kfar Saba/Kohav Yair	47–99	Hapoel Gilboa Galil
Maccabi Ra'anana	108-103	Maccabi Kiryat Gat
Hapoel Galil Elyon	91-93	Ironi Nes Ziona
Elitzur Ramla	67-94	Ironi Nahariya
Hapoel Migdal HaEmek	52-79	Hapoel Holon

== Round of 16 ==
Home team	Score	Away team
Maccabi Kiryat Gat	78–82	Hapoel Eilat
Barak Netanya	90–84	Ironi Nahariya
Maccabi Haifa	99–87	Hapoel Holon
Maccabi Hod HaSharon	75-76	Hapoel Gilboa Galil
Maccabi Rishon LeZion	74-72	Bnei Herzliya
A.S. Ramat HaSharon	63–94	Hapoel Jerusalem
Hapoel Afula	60-97	Maccabi Tel Aviv
Hapoel Tel Aviv	92-78	Ironi Nes Ziona

== Quarterfinals ==
Home team	Score	Away team
Hapoel Eilat	96–85	Barak Netanya
Maccabi Haifa	79–61	Hapoel Gilboa Galil
Maccabi Rishon LeZion	78–81	Hapoel Jerusalem
Maccabi Tel Aviv	73-71	Hapoel Tel Aviv

== Bracket ==
Semifinals
Hapoel Jerusalem	97
Hapoel Eilat	65
Maccabi Haifa	87
Maccabi Tel Aviv	90

Final
Hapoel Jerusalem	76
Maccabi Tel Aviv	94

=== Semifinals ===
16 February

Hapoel Jerusalem	97–65	Hapoel Eilat

Pais Arena, Jerusalem

16 February

Maccabi Haifa	87–90	Maccabi Tel Aviv

Pais Arena, Jerusalem

=== Final ===
19 February

Report

Maccabi Tel Aviv	94–76	Hapoel Jerusalem
Pts: Smith 27		Pts: Wright 22

Pais Arena, Jerusalem

Maccabi	Hapoel

Game rules
Game was played under FIBA rules.

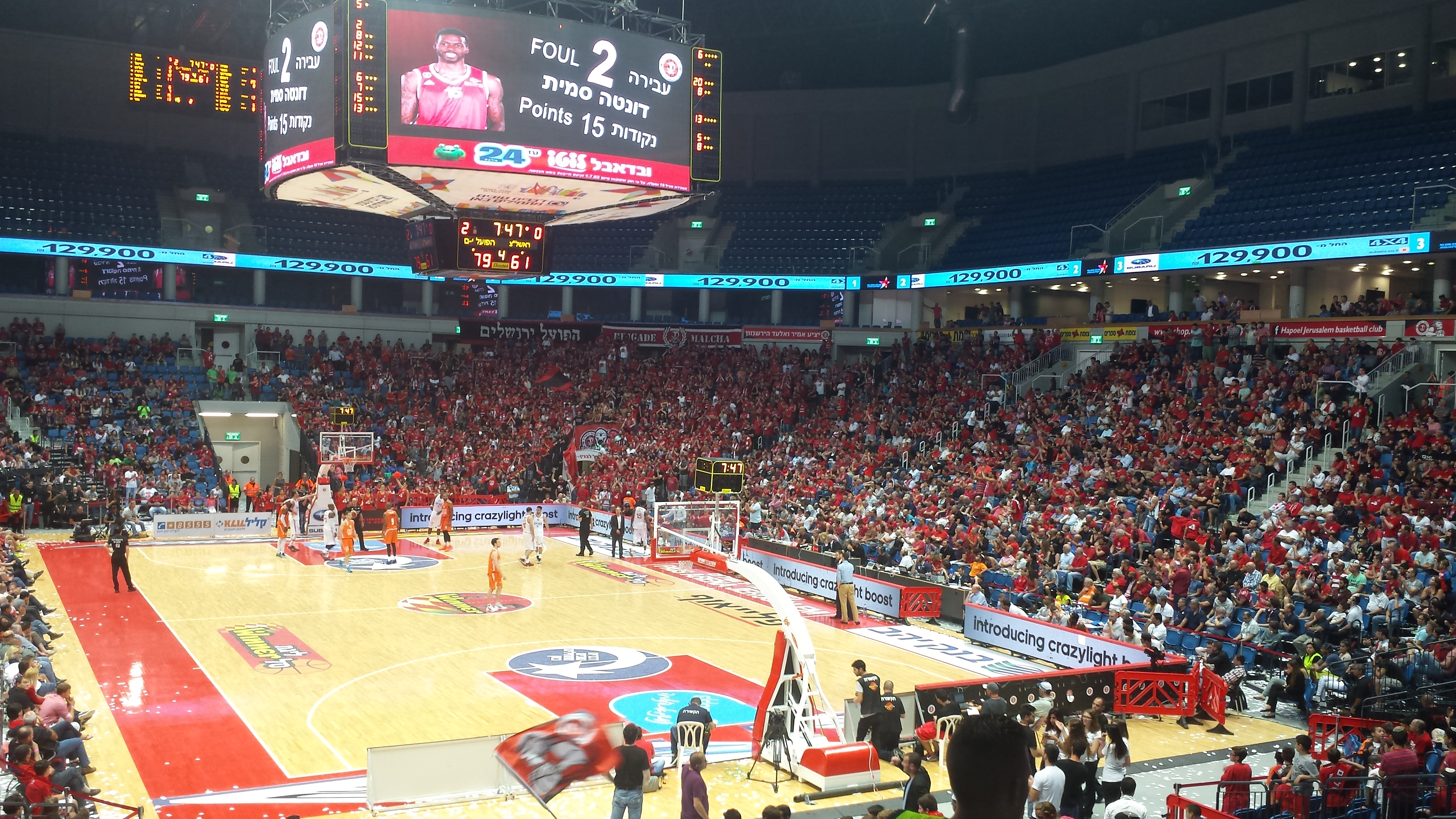
Jerusalem Arena

2015 Israeli State Cup Winners
Maccabi Tel Aviv B.C.
(42nd title)

== See also ==
- 2014–15 Israeli Basketball Super League
- Israeli Basketball State Cup
