= Hapoel Jerusalem B.C. =

Basketball team in Israel

Hapoel Jerusalem
- Leagues: Israeli Premier League; EuroCup
- Founded: 1943; 83 years ago
- History: Hapoel Jerusalem B.C. (1943–present)
- Arena: Pais Arena
- Capacity: 11,000
- Location: Jerusalem, Israel
- Team colors: Red, Black, White
- Main sponsor: Midtown Jerusalem
- CEO: Oren Arielly
- President: Matan Adelson
- Head coach: Saša Obradović
- Ownership: Matan Adelson (90%); Fan association (10%)
- Championships: 1 EuroCup; 2 Israeli Championship; 8 Israeli State Cups; 7 Israeli League Cups; 1 Israeli Super Cup
- Website: hapoel.co.il
Home	Away	Third

Hapoel Jerusalem Basketball Club (Hebrew: מועדון כדורסל הפועל ירושלים), known for sponsorship reasons as Hapoel Midtown Jerusalem (הפועל מידטאון ירושלים), is a professional basketball club based in Jerusalem and competes in the Israeli Basketball Premier League, the top tier of Israeli basketball, and in the EuroCup. It has won several titles, including the ULEB Cup (now called EuroCup) in 2004, the Israeli Basketball Premier League championship in 2015 and 2017, and seven state Cups. In 2013, a new ownership group took over, and the club has since seen a remarkable advancement and expansion. The team began playing in the Pais Arena in 2014.

== History ==
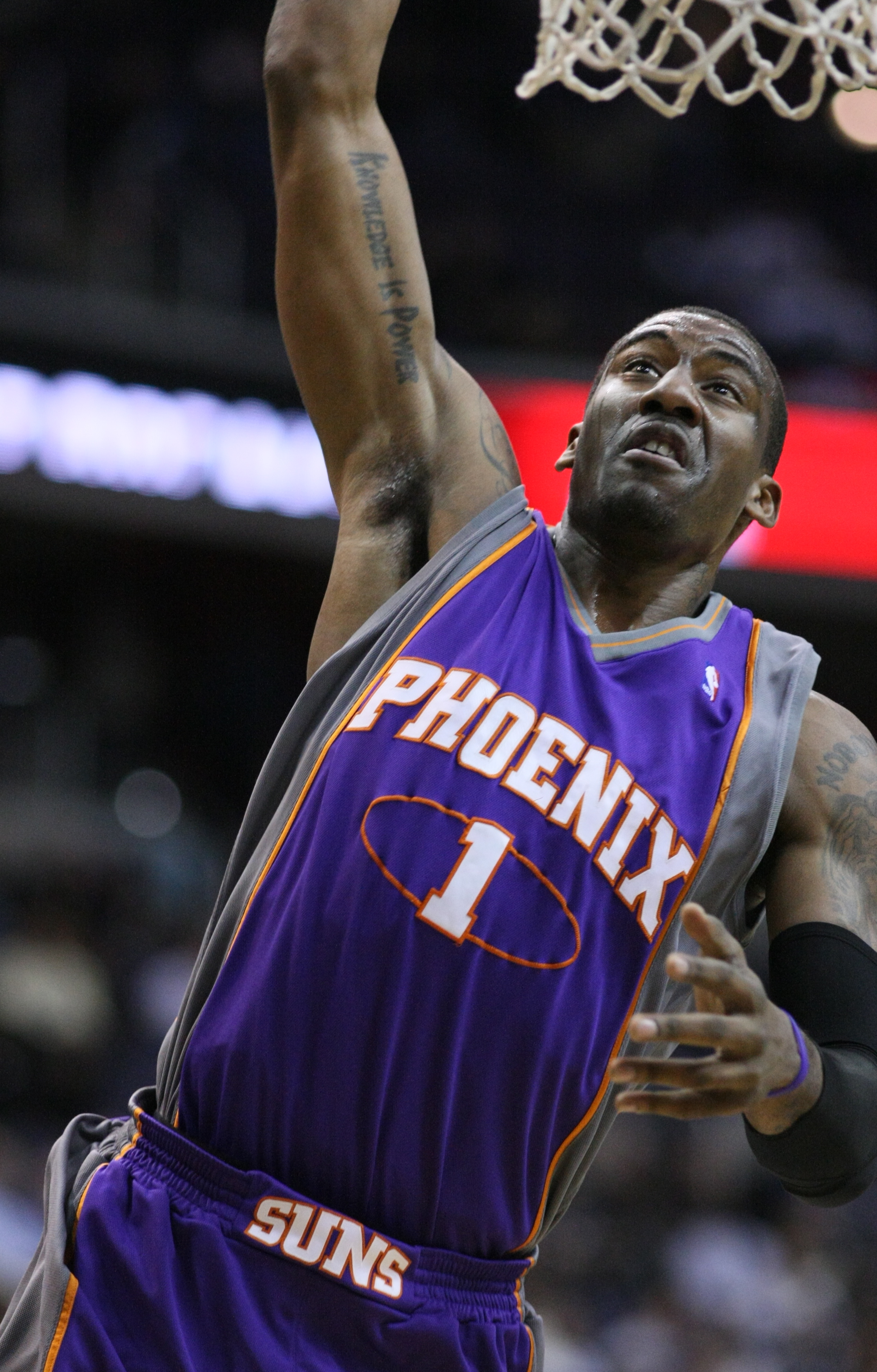
Amar'e Stoudemire

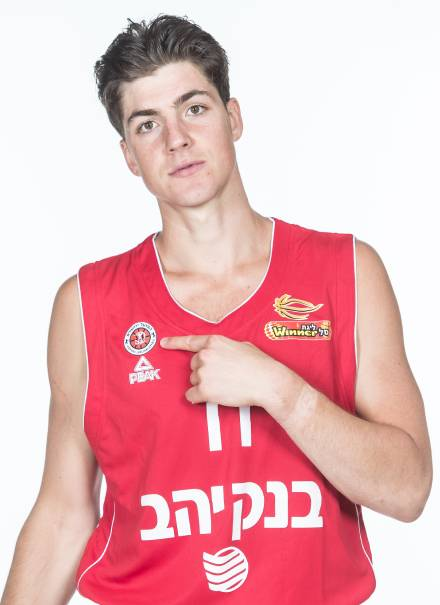
Adam Ariel

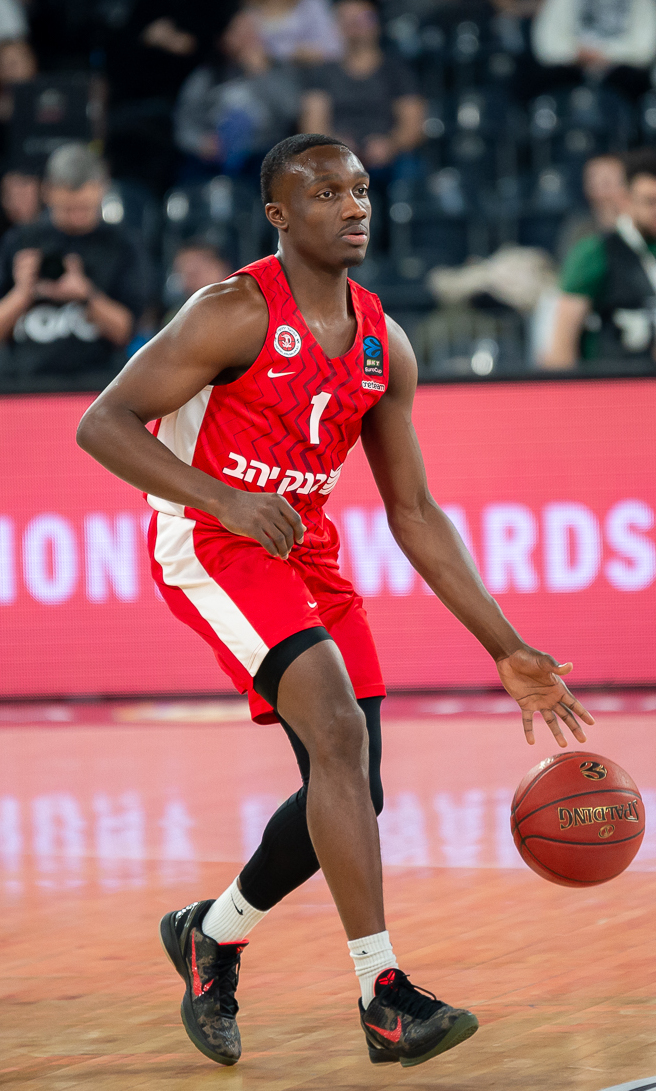
Jared Harper

Hapoel Jerusalem Basketball Club was founded in 1935, and incorporated in 1943. It made its first appearance in the Israeli Basketball Premier League in 1955. Hapoel Jerusalem played in the first division most of the 1950s and 1960s, with notable players such as David Kaminsky. The following two decades had ups and downs, as Hapoel Jerusalem toggled between the first and second divisions.

In 1986, led by coach Simi Riger, the team advanced to the Premier League, after five consecutive years in the second division. Since then, Hapoel Jerusalem has remained in the Premier League. In 1996 and 1997, Hapoel Jerusalem won the Israeli Basketball State Cup, defeating Maccabi Tel Aviv in the finals, at the Yad Eliyahu Arena. The team was led by Adi Gordon.

In 2004, Hapoel Jerusalem won its first European title, the ULEB Cup (EuroCup), defeating Real Madrid in the final in Charleroi, Belgium.

In 2005, Israeli-Russian billionaire Arcadi Gaydamak purchased a large stake in the club. As a result, the team became stronger and signed four American players with NBA records – Tamar Slay, Horace Jenkins, Roger Mason, and Mario Austin, as well as Israeli star Meir Tapiro.

In 2007, Hapoel Jerusalem won its third Israel State Cup, defeating Bnei HaSharon. In early 2008 Hapoel Jerusalem came back from being 22 points down in the 4th quarter, to win its fourth State Cup, beating Maccabi Tel Aviv 93–89. In late 2008 it won its first Israeli Basketball League Cup, beating Ironi Nahariya.

In September 2009, oil tycoon Guma Aguiar became the team's sponsor and helped pay debts left by Gaydamak. On October 8, 2009, Hapoel Jerusalem beat Maccabi Tel Aviv in the Winner Cup finals, winning the club's second cup in a row.

One year after the mysterious disappearance of Guma Aguiar, in 2013 a new ownership group headed by entrepreneur Ori Allon took over. Guy Harel succeeded Dani Klein as general manager.

In April 2014, the New York Post and The Wall Street Journal reported that six-time NBA All-Star Amar'e Stoudemire might join Hapoel Jerusalem after his contract with the New York Knicks expired at the end of the 2014–15 NBA season. Stoudemire decided to retire from the NBA in July 2016.

Amar'e Stoudemire signed a two-year contract with Hapoel Jerusalem on August 1, 2016. In his first season with the team he helped it win the Israeli Basketball League Cup, defeating Maccabi Tel Aviv.

On June 20, 2014, the club signed coach Danny Franco. That same day, the club also signed season MVP Donta Smith. On June 25, 2014, the executive board of Euroleague Commercial Assets agreed to give Hapoel Jerusalem a wild card to compete for a spot in the EuroLeague qualifications.

On June 25, 2015, Hapoel Jerusalem won the Israeli Basketball Premier League Championship for the first time in their history, defeating Hapoel Eilat in the Final. On June 15, 2017, the club won the Israeli Championship for the second time, defeating Maccabi Haifa in the Israeli Final.

On June 1, 2023, Matan Adelson purchased a 90% stake of the club for $20 million, with the remaining 10% held by the Hapoel fan association. Among his goals were to expand the brand internationally and enter the Euroleague, alongside Maccabi Tel Aviv.

== Team management ==
=== Ownership ===
- 90%: Matan Adelson
- 10%: Fan association

=== Staff ===
- General Manager: Dan Shamir
- Head coach: Saša Obradović
- Physiotherapists: Gadi Hadad and Yanai Barak
- Team doctor: Dr. Jonathan (Jonty) Maresky
- Orthopedist: Dr. Adi Fridman

== Fans and arena ==
=== The Brigade ===
Brigade Malcha is the official ultras organization of Hapoel Jerusalem B.C. In Malha Arena, the Brigade was located behind the south side basket. At the Pais Arena, the Brigade is located in stands #1 and #12. The Brigade has close connections with the team itself, and is consulted by management on instrumental decisions, such as changing the team logo, and planning events with the community.

==== Rivalry with Maccabi Tel Aviv ====
Since the founding of the club in 1943, Hapoel Jerusalem has developed a major rivalry with Tel Aviv's leading basketball club Maccabi Tel Aviv. Throughout the years, many games between the two teams became a part of the 'Hall of Fame' of Israeli basketball. The rivalry between the teams is very deep and emotional. Due to its vast size, the Pais Arena has brought Israel's largest basketball rivalry to a whole new level.

=== Malha Arena (1985–2014) ===
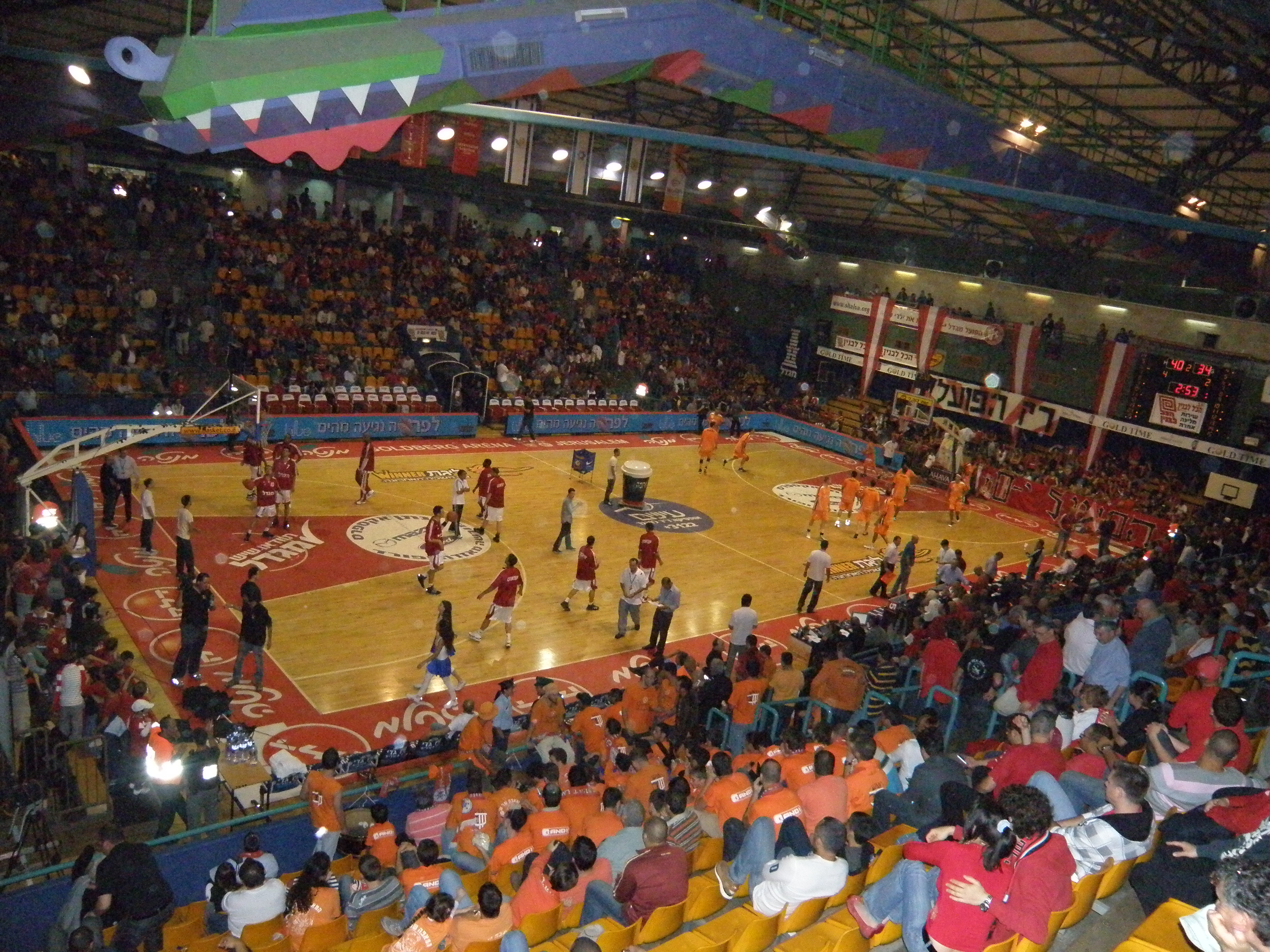
Malha Arena

When Hapoel Jerusalem was founded, it initially played in a small court on Histadrut Street, in the city center, before moving to the Jerusalem International YMCA arena. In the mid-1950s, it moved to the only indoor arena in Jerusalem at that time, "the Straus Arena," in the Histadrut building, on Straus Street. Malha Arena was used as Hapoel Jerusalem's home area from 1985 to 2014. It has a seating capacity of 3,000 seats, with 2,540 seats in its lower tier, an additional 460 seats in its upper tier. With its small size, the arena traps in noise, and distracts the opposing team. This gives a boost to players towards the end of the game when they need it most, according to the former head coach of Hapoel Jerusalem, Oded Kattash.

=== Pais Arena (2014–present) ===
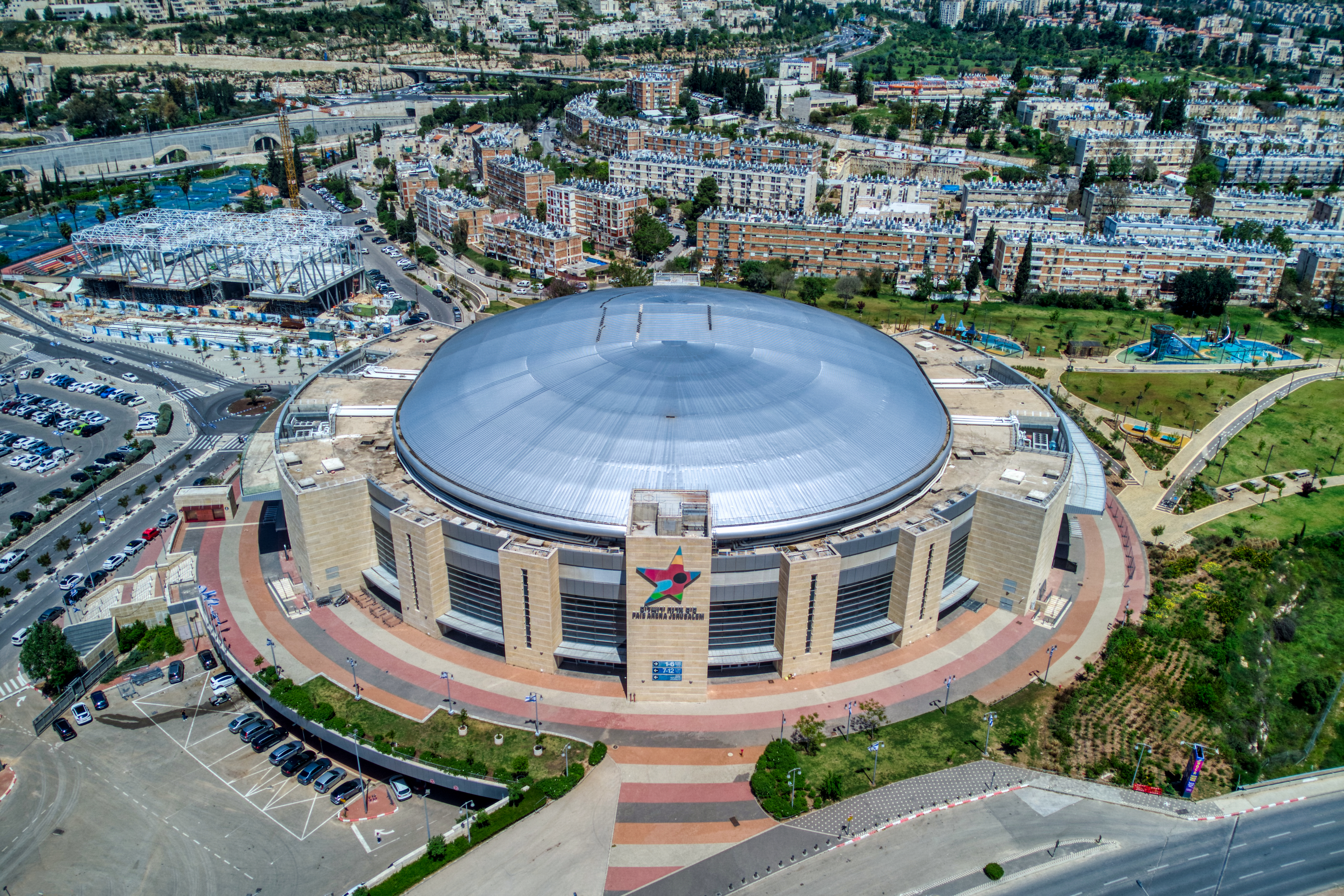
Pais Arena

Former Mayor of Jerusalem, and Prime Minister of Israel, Ehud Olmert, proposed the master plan for the arena in 2004, and it took ten years to build. Though the Pais Arena is less than two kilometers from the team's previous home, which was opened in 1985, it is exponentially larger. The arena features 11,000 seats, four times as many as in Goldberg Arena, and all the modern amenities expected of a modern basketball venue. The stadium has twelve corporate boxes, each listed for $100,000 per season. The site was chosen far back, but the building only took place in recent years. With an eye towards what the future might bring, the arena has been built to EuroLeague standards. Playing in the EuroLeague in the next few years, is a goal that the team has publicly set for itself. The Pais Arena was opened in the 2014–15 season.

== Sponsors ==
The team's main corporate sponsor is Israel Canada, which contributed to the teams name: Hapoel "Midtown" Jerusalem, after the companie's "Midtown Jerusalem" project. Secondary sponsors include Nike, Prima hotels, Hadassah hospital.

== Current roster ==
Note: Flags indicate national team eligibility at FIBA-sanctioned events. Players may hold other non-FIBA nationalities not displayed.

Hapoel Jerusalem roster
Players
Coaches

Pos.	No.	Nat.	Name	Ht.	Wt.	Age
C	0	(United States)	Cacok, Devontae	2.03 m (6 ft 8 in)	109 kg (240 lb)	30 – 8 October 1996
PG	1	(United States)	Harper, Jared (injured)	1.78 m (5 ft 10 in)	79 kg (174 lb)	29 – 14 September 1997
PF	2	(United States)	Lofton Jr., Kenneth	1.98 m (6 ft 6 in)	125 kg (276 lb)	24 – 14 August 2002
G	3	(Croatia)	Smith, Jaleen	1.93 m (6 ft 4 in)	93 kg (205 lb)	31 – 24 November 1994
PG	4	(Spain)	Brown, Lorenzo	1.96 m (6 ft 5 in)	86 kg (190 lb)	36 – 26 August 1990
G/F	7	(Israel)	Luberboim, Shahar	1.92 m (6 ft 4 in)	98 kg (216 lb)	18 – 22 July 2008
PF	8	(Israel)	Hanochi, Yotam	2.06 m (6 ft 9 in)	104 kg (229 lb)	25 – 8 December 2000
PG	9	(United States)	Milton, Shake	1.96 m (6 ft 5 in)	93 kg (205 lb)	30 – 26 September 1996
C	11	(Serbia)	Miletić, Dušan	2.15 m (7 ft 1 in)	103 kg (227 lb)	28 – 30 August 1998
PG	13	(Israel)	Huber, Roi	1.88 m (6 ft 2 in)	86 kg (190 lb)	29 – 10 February 1997
PF	15	(Israel)	Levi, Nimrod	2.08 m (6 ft 10 in)	104 kg (229 lb)	31 – 24 March 1995
F	21	(United States)	Roddy, David	1.96 m (6 ft 5 in)	116 kg (256 lb)	25 – 27 March 2001
C	33	(Israel)	Chachashvili, Gabriel	2.10 m (6 ft 11 in)	100 kg (220 lb)	26 – 8 December 1999
SG	35	(Israel)	Burg, Ethan	1.91 m (6 ft 3 in)	90 kg (198 lb)	24 – 4 September 2002
G/F	50	(Israel)	Zoosman, Yovel (C)	2.00 m (6 ft 7 in)	90 kg (198 lb)	28 – 12 May 1998

Head coach

- (Serbia) Saša Obradović

Assistant coach(es)

- (Greece) Theodoros Giannakopoulos
- (Israel) Shai Oleartchik

Athletic trainer(s)

- (Poland) Pioter Pigla

Legend

- (C) Team captain
- (IN) Inactive player
- Injured

- Roster
Updated: September 9, 2026

=== Depth chart ===
Pos.	Starting 5	Bench 1	Bench 2	Inactive
C	Dušan Miletić	Devontae Cacok	Gabriel Chachashvili
PF	Kenneth Lofton Jr.	Nimrod Levi	Yotam Hanochi
SF	Yovel Zoosman	David Roddy	Shahar Luberboim
SG	Jaleen Smith	Shake Milton	Ethan Burg
PG	Lorenzo Brown	Roi Huber		Jared Harper (injured)

- The Israeli league rule requires every team to have at least one Israeli on the court at any time.
- There should be maximum 5 non-Israeli players on a 12-men game sheet.

Source: basket.co.il

== Notable players ==
Note: Flags indicate national team eligibility at FIBA-sanctioned events. Players may hold other non-FIBA nationalities not displayed.

Criteria

To appear in this section a player must have either:

- Set a club record or won an individual award while at the club
- Played at least one official international match for their national team at any time
- Played at least one official NBA match at any time.

- (Israel) David Kaminsky 7 seasons: '58–'63, '77
- Israel Berlinsky 11 seasons: '59–'70
- (Israel) Itzhak Neumann 11 seasons: '59–'70
- (Israel) Yoel Steinberg 13 seasons: '63–'76
- (Israel) Doron Shefa 10 seasons: '80–'81, '89–'94, '96–'00
- (United States) (Israel) David Blatt 1 season: '86–'87
- (Israel) Pini Levi 9 seasons: '87–'94, '95–'97
- (Israel) Erez Hazan 5 seasons: '88–'93
- (Bosnia and Herzegovina) Emir Mutapčić 2 seasons: '89–'91
- (Israel) Shalom Turgeman 11 seasons: '89–'96, '97–'01
- (United States) (Israel) Hubert Roberts 4 seasons: '90–'91, '93–'96
- (Israel) Adi Gordon 6 seasons: '91–'94, '95–'98
- (United States) Norris Coleman 3 seasons: '92–'94, '95–'96
- (Israel) Miki Berkovich 1 season: '93–'94
- (United States) Billy Thompson 3 seasons: '94–'97
- (United States) (Israel) Jon Dalzell 3 seasons: '94–'97
- (Israel) Moti Daniel 2 seasons: '96–'98
- (United States) (Israel) H Waldman 4 seasons: '96–'00
- (Serbia) Radisav Ćurčić 2 seasons: '97–'99
- (United States) Kenny Williams 4 seasons: '97–'01
- (United States) Derrick Hamilton 2 seasons: '98–'00
- (Israel) Erez Katz 6 seasons: '98–'04
- (United States) (United Kingdom) Tony Dorsey 1 season: '00–'01
- (United States) Haywoode Workman 1 season: '00–'01
- (Israel) Meir Tapiro 6 seasons: '00–'03, '05–'07, '12–'13
- (United States) Demetrius Alexander 1 season: '01–'02
- (Israel) Moshe Mizrahi 5 seasons: '01–'04, '10–'12
- (Lithuania) Andrius Jurkūnas 1 season: '02–'03
- (Nigeria) Tunji Awojobi 1 season: '03–'04
- (United States) Kelly McCarty 1 season: '03–'04
- (Israel) Doron Sheffer 2 seasons: '03–'05
- (United States) Will Solomon 2 seasons: '03–'04, '10–'11
- (Israel) Ido Kozikaro 3 seasons: '03–'06
- (Israel) Yuval Naimy 4 seasons: '03–'04, '09–'12
- (United States) William Avery 1 season: '04–'05
- (Israel) Matan Naor 3 seasons: '04–'07
- (Israel) Raviv Limonad 3 seasons: '04–'06, '12
- (United States) Roger Mason, Jr. 1 season: '05–'06
- (United States) Horace Jenkins 2 seasons: '05–'06, '07
- (United States) Mario Austin 2 seasons: '05–'07
- (United States) Terence Morris 1 season: '06–'07
- (Slovenia) Jurica Golemac 1 season: '06–'07
- (Israel) Dror Hagag 2 seasons: '06–'08
- (Israel) Erez Markovich 3 seasons: '05–'08
- (Israel) Guy Pnini 2 seasons: '06–'08
- (United States) Timmy Bowers 3 seasons: '06–'09
- (United States) (Israel) Jamie Arnold 1 season: '07–'08
- (United States) Ramel Curry 1 season: '07–'08
- (United States) Marcus Slaughter 1 season: '07–'08
- (Israel) Sharon Shason 3 seasons: '07–'10
- (United States) Omar Sneed 1 season: '08–'09
- (United States) Travis Watson 1 season: '08–'09
- (United States) Eugene Jeter 1 season: '09–'10
- (United States) Tre Simmons 1 season: '09–'10
- (United States) Dijon Thompson 2 seasons: '09–'10, '16–'17
- (Israel) Yogev Ohayon 4 seasons: '09–'11, '17–'19
- (Israel) Uri Kokia 4 seasons: '09–'13
- (United States) Jason Rich 1 season: '10–'11
- (United States) Brian Randle 3 seasons: '10–'12, '17
- (United States) D. J. Strawberry 1 season: '11–'12
- (Israel) Elishay Kadir 2 seasons: '11–'13
- (United States) Ramel Bradley 1 season: '11–'12
- (Israel) Adam Ariel 5 season: '12–'15, '20-'22
- (United States) Jacob Pullen 1 season: '12–'13
- (United States) Courtney Fells 1 season: '12–'13
- (United States) Josh Duncan 3 seasons: '12–'14, '15–'16
- (Israel) Rafi Menco 4 seasons: '12–'16
- (Jamaica) Samardo Samuels 1 season: '13
- (Belarus) Artsiom Parakhouski 1 season: '13–'14
- (United States) Derwin Kitchen 2 seasons: '13–'15
- (Israel) Yotam Halperin 5 seasons: '13–'18
- (Israel) Lior Eliyahu 6 seasons: '13–'19
- (United States) Bracey Wright 1 season: '14–'15
- (United States) Tony Gaffney 2 seasons: '14–'16
- (United States) Donta Smith 2 seasons: '14–'16
- (Israel) Bar Timor 7 seasons: '14–'20
- (United States) (Israel) D'Or Fischer 1 season: '15–'16
- (United States) E. J. Rowland 1 season: '15–'16
- (United States) (Israel) Amar'e Stoudemire 2 seasons: '16–'17, '18–'19
- (United States) Curtis Jerrells 1 season: '16–'17
- (United States) Jerome Dyson 2 seasons: '16–'18
- (United States) Tarence Kinsey 2 seasons: '16–'18
- (Dominican Republic) James Feldeine 2 seasons: '18–'20
- (Israel) Tamir Blatt 3 seasons: '18–'21
- (United States) TaShawn Thomas 3 seasons: '18–'21
- (United States) J'Covan Brown 3 seasons: '18–'21
- (Nigeria) Suleiman Braimoh 3 seasons: '19-'22
- (United States) John Holland 1 season: '19-'20
- (United States) Shelvin Mack 1 season: '20
- (United States) Emanuel Terry 1 season: '20
- (Lithuania) Deividas Sirvydis 1 season: '20
- (United States) Chris Kramer 1 season: '20-'21
- (United States) Stanton Kidd 1 season: '21
- (United States) Ray McCallum Jr. 1 season: '21
- (United States) Jalen Adams 1 season: '21-'22
- (Belgium) Retin Obasohan 1 season: '21-'22
- (Israel) Itay Segev 2 seasons: '21-'23
- (United States) K. C. Rivers 1 season: '22
- (Latvia) Mareks Mejeris 1 season: '22-'23
- (Estonia) Siim-Sander Vene 1 season: '22-'23
- (United States) Brandon Brown 1 season: '22-'23
- (United States) Zach Hankins 2 seasons: '22-'24
- (United States) Levi Randolph 2 seasons: '22-'24
- (United States) JaCorey Williams 1 season: '24
- (United States) (Israel) Alex Tyus 1 season: '24

== Head coaches ==
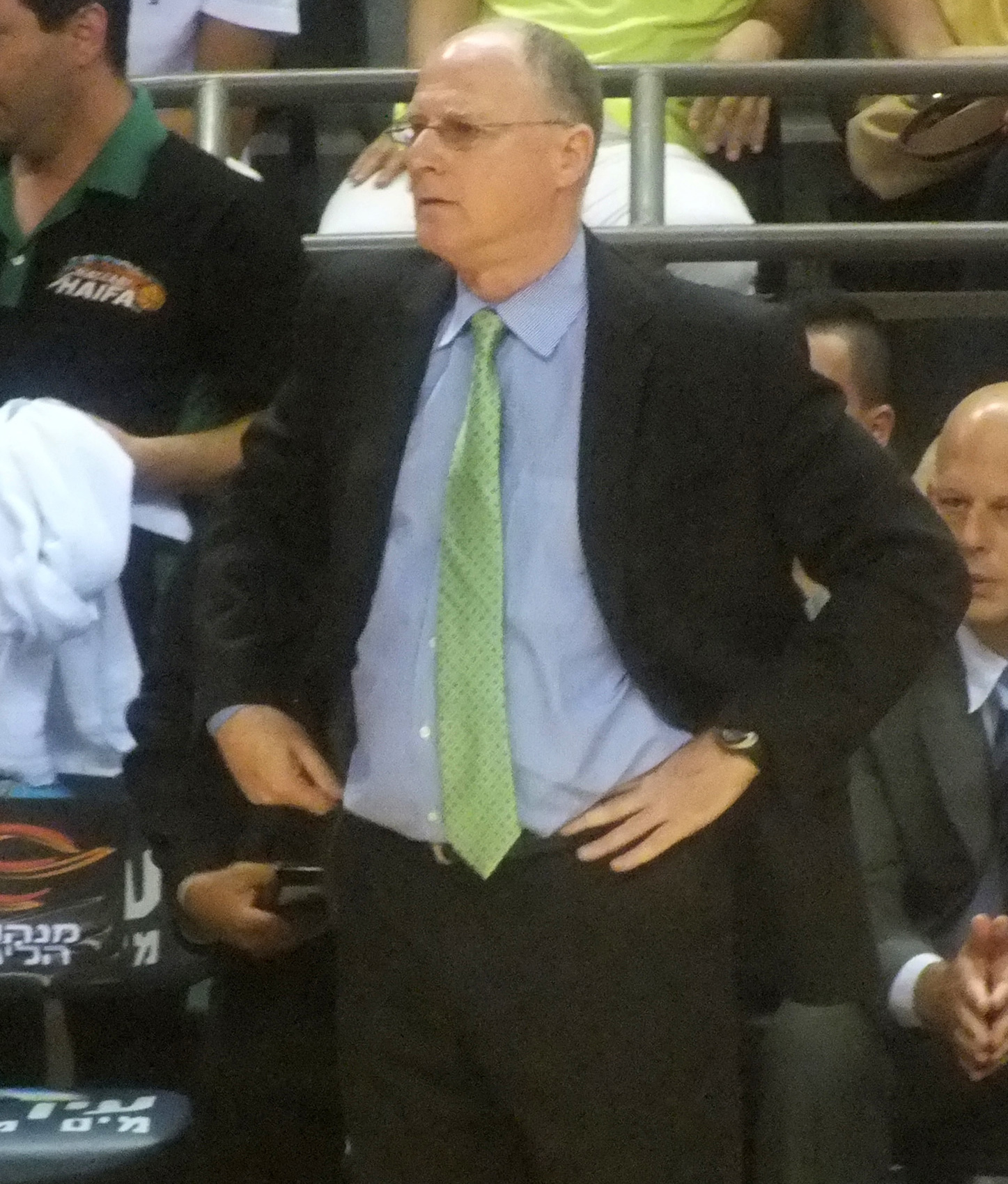
Brad Greenberg

- (Israel) David Kaminsky
- (Israel) Yoram Harush
- (Israel) Effi Birnbaum
- (Israel) Pini Gershon
- (Israel) Zvi Sherf
- (Israel) Sharon Drucker
- (Israel) Erez Edelstein
- (Israel) Dan Shamir
- (Israel) Guy Goodes
- (Israel) Mody Maor
- (Israel) Oded Kattash
- (Israel) Danny Franco
- (Israel) Oren Amiel
- (Israel) Yonatan Alon
- (Israel) Yotam Halperin
- (United States) Brad Greenberg
- (Italy) Simone Pianigiani
- (Serbia) Aleksandar Džikić
- (Serbia) Faruk Kulenović
- (Greece) Fotios Katsikaris
- (Greece) Ilias Kantzouris
- (Lithuania) Dainius Adomaitis

== Season by season ==
Season	Tier	League	Pos.	Israeli Cup	League Cup	European competitions	
1991–92	1	Premier League	5th	Eightfinalist	—N/a	3 Korać Cup	EF
1992–93	1	Premier League	4th	Semifinalist	—N/a	3 Korać Cup	PR
1993–94	1	Premier League	3rd	Semifinalist	—N/a	3 Korać Cup	PR
1994–95	1	Premier League	7th	Semifinalist	—N/a	2 Saporta Cup	PR
1995–96	1	Premier League	2nd	Champions	—N/a		
1996–97	1	Premier League	2nd	Champions	—N/a	2 Saporta Cup	QF
1997–98	1	Premier League	4th		—N/a	1 Euroleague	RS
1998–99	1	Premier League	2nd	Runner-up	—N/a	1 Saporta Cup	EF
1999–00	1	Premier League	7th	Runner-up	—N/a	2 Saporta Cup	EF
2000–01	1	Premier League	2nd	Runner-up	—N/a	1 Euroleague	RS
2001–02	1	Premier League	3rd	Runner-up	—N/a	2 Saporta Cup	SF
2002–03	1	Premier League	8th	Semifinalist	—N/a	3 EuroCup Challenge	GS2
2003–04	1	Premier League	5th	Runner-up	—N/a	2 ULEB Cup	C
2004–05	1	Premier League	5th	Eightfinalist	—N/a	2 ULEB Cup	RS
2005–06	1	Premier League	2nd	Runner-up	—N/a	2 ULEB Cup	SF
2006–07	1	Premier League	2nd	Champions	3rd	2 ULEB Cup	QF
2007–08	1	Premier League	5th	Champions	Runner-up	2 ULEB Cup	R32
2008–09	1	Premier League	4th	Semifinalist	Champions	3 EuroChallenge	RS
2009–10	1	Premier League	3rd	Eightfinalist	Champions	2 Eurocup	QF
2010–11	1	Premier League	3rd	Quarterfinalist	Runner-up	2 Eurocup	RS
2011–12	1	Premier League	6th	Eightfinalist	Semifinalist	2 Eurocup	RS
2012–13	1	Premier League	4th	Semifinalist	Semifinalist	2 Eurocup	RS
2013–14	1	Premier League	3rd	Eightfinalist	Runner-up	2 Eurocup	QF
2014–15	1	Premier League	1st	Runner-up	Champions	2 Eurocup	RS
2015–16	1	Premier League	2nd	Eightfinalist	Quarterfinalist	2 Eurocup	R32
2016–17	1	Premier League	1st	Runner-up	Champions	2 EuroCup	SF
2017–18	1	Premier League	3rd	Semifinalist	Quarterfinalist	2 EuroCup	RS
2018–19	1	Premier League	Semifinalist	Champions	Semifinalist	3 Champions League	QF
2019–20	1	Premier League	Semifinalist	Champions	Champions	3 Champions League	QF
2020–21	1	Premier League	Quarterfinalist	Semifinalist	Semifinalist	3 Champions League	RS
2020–21	1	Premier League	Quarterfinalist	Semifinalist	Semifinalist	R Balkan League	RS
2021–22	1	Premier League	Semifinalist	Quarterfinalist	Semifinalist	2 Champions League	Play-ins
2022–23	1	Premier League	Semifinalist	Champions	Semifinalist	2 Champions League	Runner-up
2023–24	1	Premier League	Semifinalist	Champions	Champions	2 Champions League	R16
2024–25	1	Premier League	Finalist Final Cancelled; No Champion Named	Runner-up	Quarterfinalist	2 EuroCup	QF
2025-26	1	Premier League	Ongoing	Semifinalist	Champions	2 EuroCup	QF
2025-26	1	Premier League	Ongoing	Semifinalist	Super Cup Champion	2 EuroCup	QF

== Logos ==
Historical Club Logos and Emblems Since 1943

2014-2026 Logo

== Honours ==
Total titles: 16

=== Domestic ===
Israeli Championships

- Winners (2): 2015, 2017
- Runner-up (7): 1996, 1997, 1999, 2001, 2006, 2007, 2016

State Cup

- Winners (8): 1996, 1997, 2007, 2008, 2019, 2020, 2023, 2024
- Runner-up (8): 1999, 2000, 2001, 2002, 2004, 2006, 2015, 2017

League Cup

- Winners (7): 2008, 2009, 2014, 2016, 2019, 2023, 2025
- Runner-up (3): 2007, 2010, 2013

Super Cup

- Winners (1): 2025

=== European ===
- EuroCup (ULEB Cup)

Winners (1): 2003–04
Semifinalist (2): 2005–06, 2016–17

- Champions League

Runner-up (1): 2022–23

- FIBA Saporta Cup

Semifinalist (1): 2001–02
