= Yotam Hanochi =

Israeli basketball player (born 2000)

Yotam Hanochi יותם חנוכי
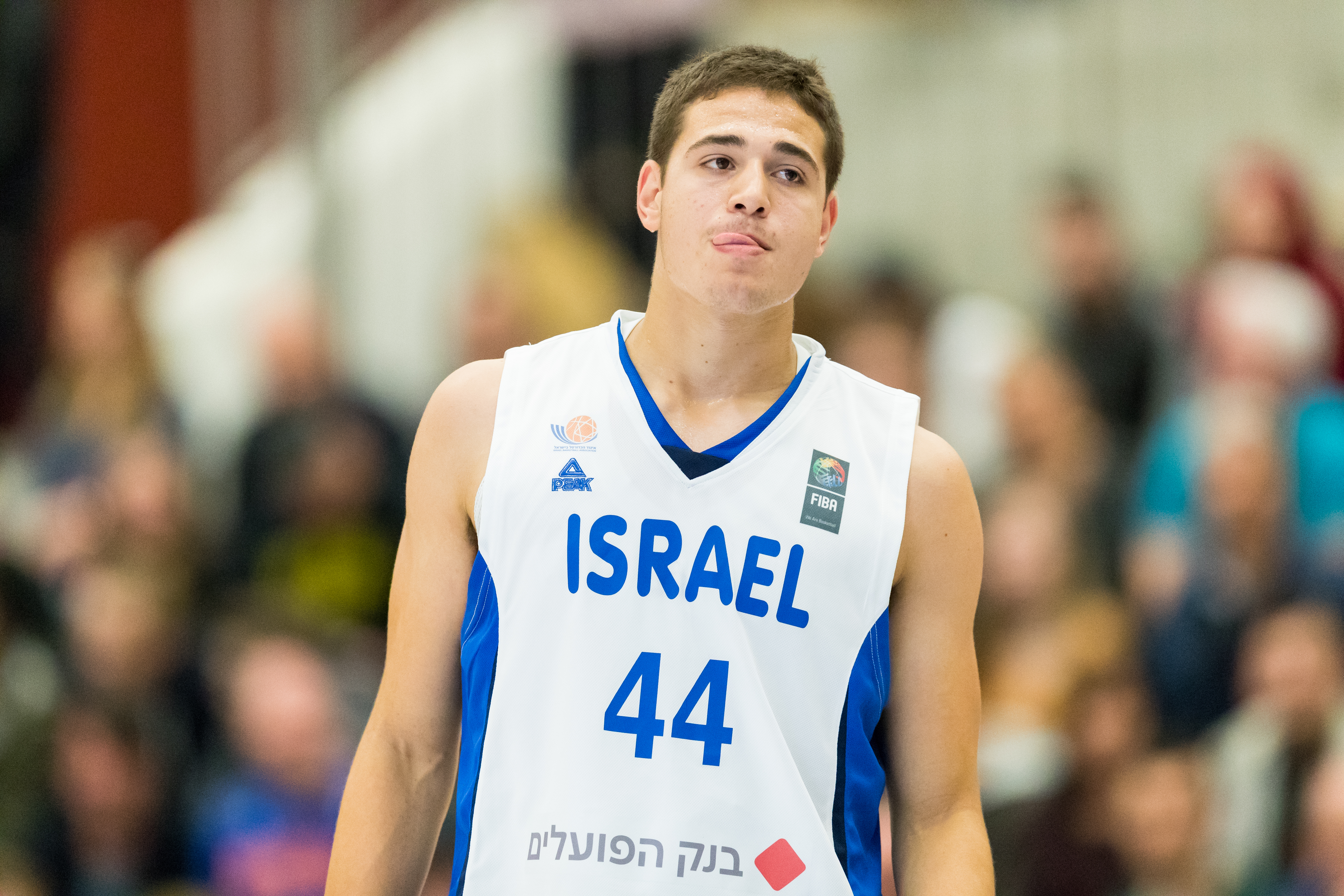
- Hanochi in 2018

No. 8 – Hapoel Jerusalem
- Position: Small forward
- League: Israeli Premier League; EuroCup

Personal information
- Born: December 8, 2000 (age 25) Afula, Israel
- Listed height: 6 ft 9 in (2.06 m)
- Listed weight: 230 lb (104 kg)

Career information
- Playing career: 2016–present

Career history
- 2016–2022: Hapoel Gilboa Galil
- 2022–2023: Ironi Kiryat Ata
- 2023–2024: Hapoel Holon
- 2025–2026: Maccabi Ra'anana
- 2026–present: Hapoel Jerusalem

Yotam Hanochi (Hebrew: יותם חנוכי; born December 8, 2000) is an Israeli-Portuguese professional basketball player for Hapoel Jerusalem of the Israeli Premier League and the EuroCup. He plays the small forward position.

== Biography ==
His hometown is Afula, Israel. He is 6 ft 10 in (208 cm) tall and weighs 218 pounds (99 kg).

He played for Team Israel in the 2017 FIBA U18 European Championship - Division B averaging 5.3 points and 3.5 rebounds per game, and in the 2019 FIBA U20 European Championship, averaging 8.1 points and 3.3 rebounds per game.

In 2020-21 he played for Hapoel Gilboa Galil and averaged 5.0 points and 2.7 rebounds per game. In 2021-22 he returned to the team, and averaged 6.0 points and 3.3 rebounds per game.

On July 21, 2023, he signed with Hapoel Holon of the Israeli Basketball Premier League.
