= 2014 Israeli Basketball League Cup =

Israeli basketball pre-season tournament

Tournament details
- Arena: Pais Arena; Jerusalem

Final positions
- Champions: Hapoel Jerusalem (3rd title)
- Runners-up: Maccabi Tel Aviv

Awards and statistics
- MVP: (Israel) Yotam Halperin

The 2014 Israeli Basketball League Cup was the 9th edition of the Israeli Basketball League Cup pre-season tournament. Hapoel Jerusalem won its third League Cup title.

== Bracket ==
Quarterfinals; 15 September
1	Maccabi Tel Aviv	73
8	Gilboa/Galil	58
3	Ironi Nes Ziona	64
6	Maccabi Haifa	61
2	Hapoel Tel Aviv	88
7	Hapoel Eilat	83
4	Hapoel Holon	61
5	Hapoel Jerusalem	86

Semifinals; September 16
1	Maccabi Tel Aviv	106
3	Ironi Nes Ziona	90
2	Hapoel Tel Aviv	70
5	Hapoel Jerusalem	89

Final; September 18
1	Maccabi Tel Aviv	78
5	Hapoel Jerusalem	81
