= Lorenzo Brown =

Spanish basketball player (born 1990)

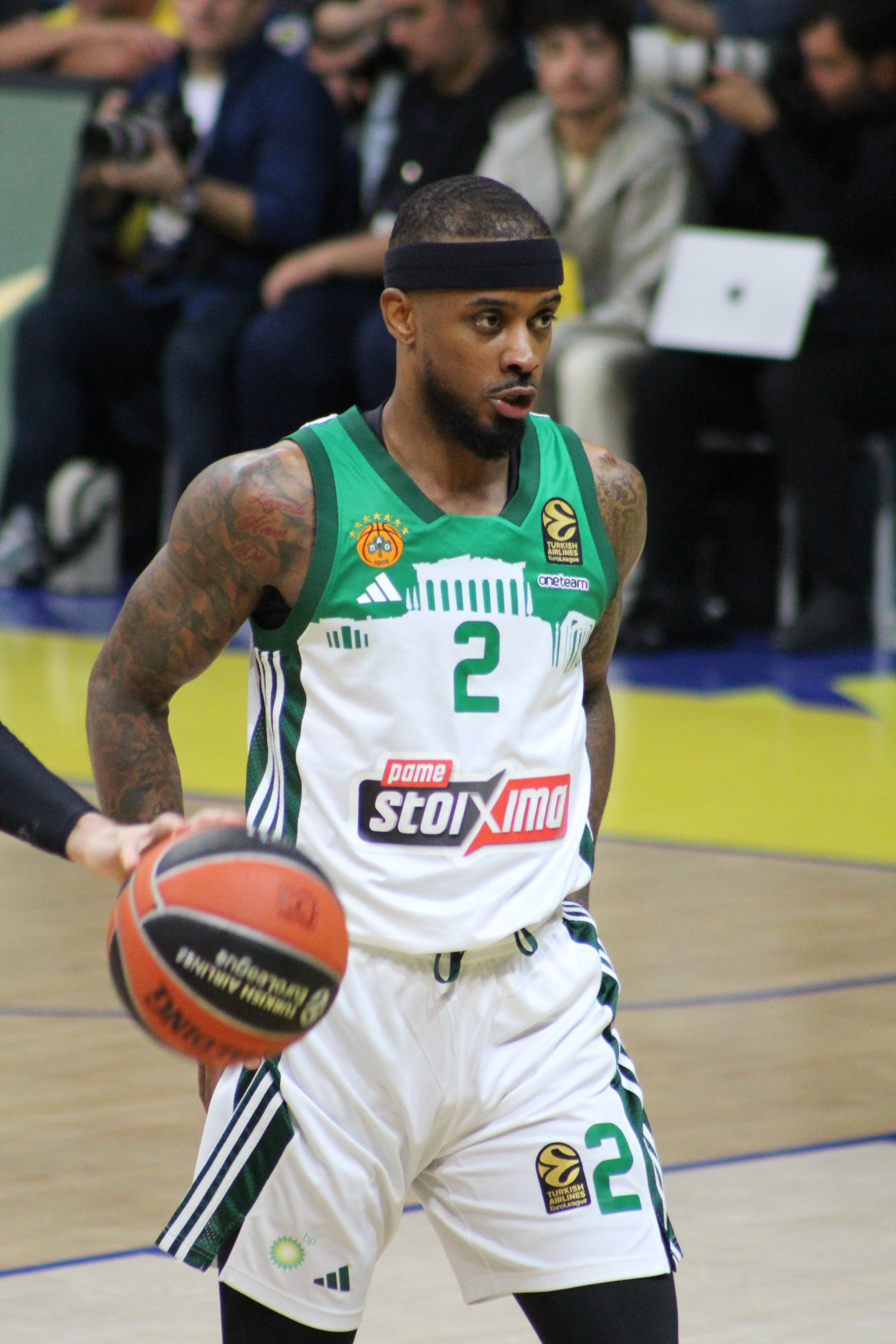
- Brown with Panathinaikos in 2024

No. 4 – Hapoel Jerusalem
- Position: Point guard
- League: Israeli Basketball Premier League; EuroCup

Personal information
- Born: 26 August 1990 (age 36) Rockford, Illinois, U.S.
- Listed height: 6 ft 5 in (1.96 m)
- Listed weight: 190 lb (86 kg)

Career information
- High school: Centennial (Roswell, Georgia); Hargrave Military Academy (Chatham, Virginia)
- College: NC State (2010–2013)
- NBA draft: 2013: 2nd round, 52nd overall pick
- Drafted by: Minnesota Timberwolves
- Playing career: 2013–present

Career history
- 2013: Springfield Armor
- 2013–2014: Philadelphia 76ers
- 2013–2014: →Delaware 87ers
- 2014: Springfield Armor
- 2014–2015: Grand Rapids Drive
- 2015: Minnesota Timberwolves
- 2015–2016: Grand Rapids Drive
- 2016: Phoenix Suns
- 2016: Grand Rapids Drive
- 2016–2017: Zhejiang Golden Bulls
- 2017: Grand Rapids Drive
- 2017–2019: Toronto Raptors
- 2017–2018: →Raptors 905
- 2019: Guangzhou Loong Lions
- 2019–2020: Crvena zvezda
- 2020–2021: Fenerbahçe
- 2021–2022: UNICS Kazan
- 2022–2024: Maccabi Tel Aviv
- 2024–2025: Panathinaikos
- 2025–present: Olimpia Milano
- 2026–present: →Hapoel Jerusalem

Career highlights
- All-EuroLeague First Team (2023); All-EuroLeague Second Team (2024); 2× Israeli Premier League champion (2023, 2024); Israeli League Cup winner (2022); Greek Cup winner (2025); Lega Serie A champion (2026); Italian Cup winner (2026); Italian Supercup winner (2025); NBA G League MVP (2018); First-team All NBA G League (2018); 2× NBA D-League All-Star (2015, 2016); Second-team All-ACC (2013); Third-team All-ACC (2012); Fourth-team Parade All-American (2009)
- Stats at NBA.com
- Stats at Basketball Reference
Medals
Men's basketball
Representing Spain
EuroBasket
Gold medal – first place	2022 Czech Republic–Georgia–Italy–Germany

Lorenzo D'Ontez Brown Banks (born 26 August 1990) is an American-born naturalized Spanish professional basketball player for Hapoel Jerusalem of the Israeli Basketball Premier League and the EuroCup, on loan from Olimpia Milano. He played college basketball for the NC State Wolfpack and spent several seasons in the National Basketball Association (NBA). Born in the United States, he plays for the Spanish national team and helped lead them to a EuroBasket title in 2022.

== High school career ==
Brown initially attended Centennial High School in his native Roswell, Georgia (United States). He averaged 20.8 points as a senior and was named a fourth-team Parade All-American and the Georgia 5A player of the Year. When he graduated in 2009, he was the No. 36 nationally and the No. 7 shooting guard overall by Rivals.com. After he graduated, he attended the Hargrave Military Academy in Chatham, Virginia.

== College career ==
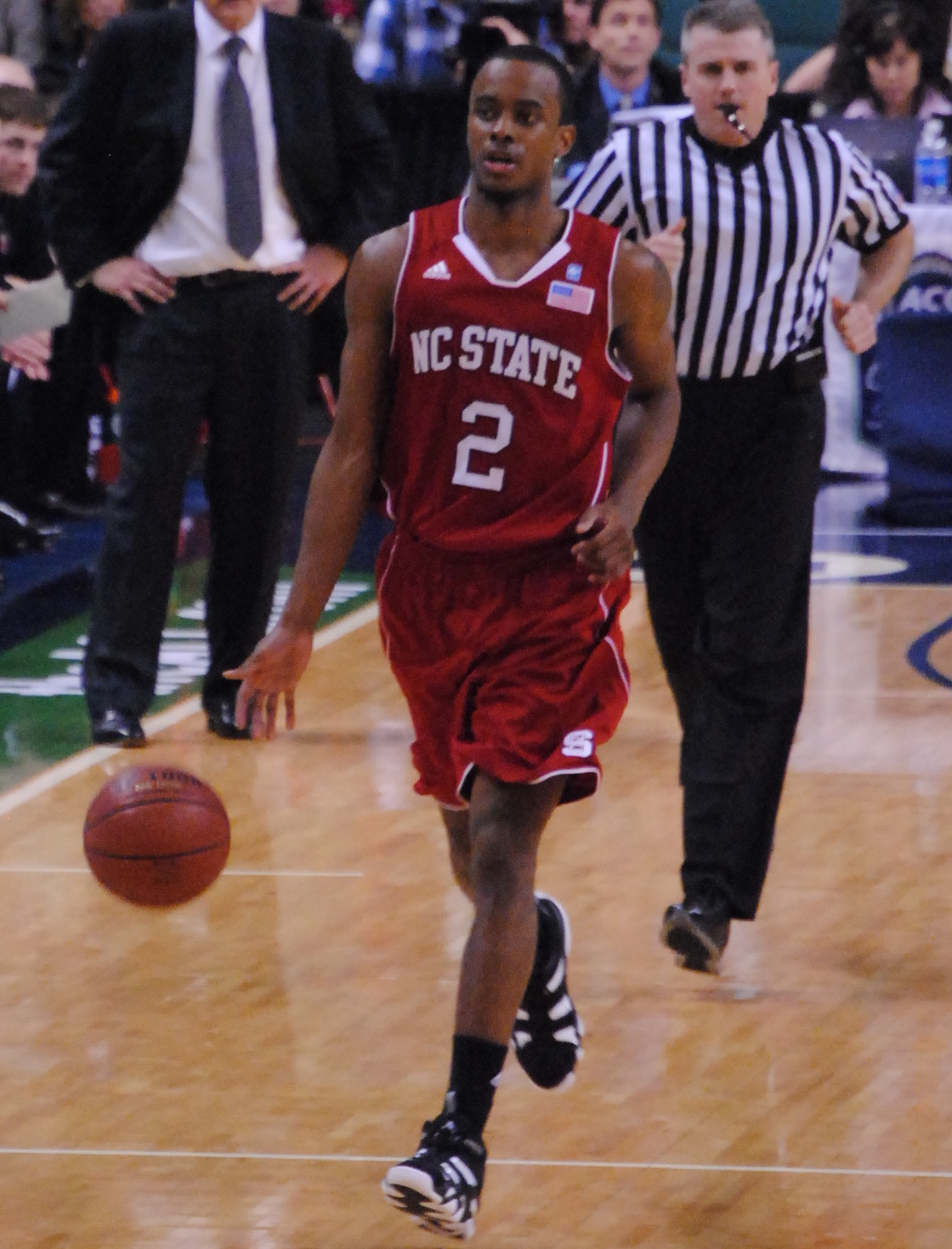
Brown at NC State (2011).

Brown, a 6'5" guard, played for NC State from 2010 to 2013. He started all three seasons and led the Wolfpack to consecutive NCAA tournament appearances in 2012 and 2013. As a junior, Brown averaged 12.4 points and 4.3 rebounds per game and led the Atlantic Coast Conference (ACC) in assists with 7.2 per game. At the close of the season, Brown was named second team All-ACC. During his college career Brown averaged 11.6 points, 4.2 rebounds, 5.8 assists and 32.6 minutes per game.

After the 2012–13 season, Brown decided to forgo his final season of college eligibility and declared for the 2013 NBA draft.

== Professional career ==
=== Springfield Armor (2013–2014) ===
Brown was selected with the 52nd overall pick in the 2013 NBA draft by the Minnesota Timberwolves and subsequently joined the team for the 2013 NBA Summer League. On September 26, 2013, he signed his first professional contract with the Timberwolves. However, he was waived by Timberwolves on October 25, 2013.

On November 1, 2013, he was acquired by the Springfield Armor.

=== Philadelphia 76ers (2013–2014) ===
On November 20, 2013, he signed with the Philadelphia 76ers. He made his debut that same day, scoring 5 points with 58 seconds left in the 4th quarter. During his rookie season, he had multiple assignments with the Delaware 87ers. On March 14, 2014, he was waived by the 76ers.

=== Return to Springfield (2014) ===
On March 16, 2014, he was re-acquired by the Springfield Armor.

=== Grand Rapids Drive (2014–2015) ===
On July 29, 2014, he signed with Reyer Venezia of Italy for the 2014–15 season. On September 5, 2014, his contract was voided by Venezia after he failed physicals. On September 25, 2014, he signed with the Detroit Pistons. However, he was later waived by the Pistons on October 20, 2014. On November 1, 2014, he was acquired by the Grand Rapids Drive. On November 15, he made his debut for the Drive in a 112–103 loss to the Bakersfield Jam, recording 14 points, six rebounds and five assists in 33 minutes. On February 4, 2015, he was named to the Futures All-Star team for the 2015 NBA D-League All-Star Game.

=== Minnesota Timberwolves (2015) ===
On January 28, 2015, he signed a 10-day contract with the Minnesota Timberwolves. Three days later, in just his third game for the Timberwolves, he was thrown into the starting line-up due to being the only healthy point guard on the team as Mo Williams and Zach LaVine were both out injured. He was forced to play all but five seconds of their 90–106 loss to the Cleveland Cavaliers as he recorded 9 assists, 6 rebounds and 1 point. He moved back to the bench the following game on February 2 with the return of Ricky Rubio from long-term injury. His playing time drastically decreased as he managed just 1:29 minutes of action in the 94–100 loss to the Dallas Mavericks. On February 6, he signed a second 10-day contract with the Timberwolves. On February 19, 2015, he signed with the Timberwolves for the rest of the season. On October 24, 2015, he was waived by the Timberwolves.

=== Return to Grand Rapids (2015–2016) ===
On November 12, 2015, Brown was reacquired by the Grand Rapids Drive. Two days later, he made his season debut in a 113–101 win over the Delaware 87ers, recording 13 points, two rebounds, two assists and three steals in 23 minutes off the bench.

=== Phoenix Suns (2016) ===
On January 8, 2016, Brown signed a 10-day contract with the Phoenix Suns. He made his debut for the Suns four days later, recording 7 points, 5 assists, 2 rebounds and 1 steal in a 116–97 loss to the Indiana Pacers. On January 18, he signed a second 10-day contract with the Suns. After his contract expired, the Suns decided to not retain him, making him a free agent. On January 29, he was named in the East All-Star team for the 2016 NBA D-League All-Star Game, earning his second straight All-Star nod.

=== Third Stint with Grand Rapids (2016) ===
On February 2, he was reacquired by the Grand Rapids Drive.

On March 18, 2016, Brown signed a 10-day contract with the Detroit Pistons. He later signed a second 10-day contract with the Pistons on March 28, and then for the rest of the season on April 13. Brown was waived by the Pistons on October 22, 2016, before playing in a game for them.

On November 4, 2016, Brown signed a deal with Russian team UNICS Kazan, but his contract was voided on November 15 after failing a physical.

=== Zhejiang Golden Bulls (2016–2017) ===
On December 8, 2016, he signed a contract with the Zhejiang Golden Bulls of the Chinese Basketball Association to replace the injured Cady Lalanne. In 20 games, he averaged 24.0 points, 7.4 rebounds, 5.5 assists, and 2.6 steals per game, and shot 80% from the free throw line.

=== Fourth Stint with Grand Rapids (2017) ===
On March 3, 2017, following the conclusion of the 2016–17 CBA season, Brown was reacquired by the Grand Rapids Drive.

=== Toronto Raptors (2017–2019) ===
==== 2017–18 season ====
Brown joined the Detroit Pistons for the 2017 NBA Summer League. He ultimately signed a two-way contract with the Toronto Raptors. Under the terms of the deal, split time between the Raptors and their G League affiliate, the Raptors 905. He also became the first player who previously had NBA experience to sign a two-way contract with an NBA team. He won the NBA G League Most Valuable Player Award for the season with Raptors 905. Prior to the close of the season, Brown's contract was upgraded to a standard deal.

==== 2018–19 season ====
On July 20, 2018, the Raptors re-signed Brown. In 26 games for the team during the 2018–19 season, Brown averaged 2.1 points per game in 8.2 minutes per game. On January 7, 2019, the Raptors waived Brown.

=== Guangzhou Loong Lions (2019) ===
On February 10, 2019, Guangzhou Loong Lions of the Chinese Basketball Association was reported to have signed Brown. Brown made his debut for the Loong Lions two days later, scoring 17 points with 2 rebounds and a steal in a 97–93 victory over the Beijing Ducks. In eight games he averaged 25.2 points, 5.4 rebounds, 4.9 assists, and 2.8 steals per game, and shot 80% from the free throw line.

=== Crvena zvezda (2019–2020) ===
On August 3, 2019, KK Crvena zvezda announced that they had signed Brown. He averaged 11.3 points, 2.9 rebounds, 5.1 assists, and 1.2 steals per game, and shot 84% from the free throw line.

=== Fenerbahçe (2020–2021) ===
On July 14, 2020, he signed with Fenerbahçe Beko of the Turkish Basketball Super League. He averaged 10.3 points, 2.4 rebounds, 3.8 assists, and 1.3 steals per game, and shot 83% from the free throw line. On June 17, 2021, Brown was released from the Turkish club.

=== UNICS Kazan (2021–2022) ===
On July 23, 2021, Brown signed a one-year contract with UNICS. He left the team in early 2022 due to the 2022 Russian invasion of Ukraine, but returned later to finish the season. He averaged 28.9 minutes, 13.7 points, 3.6 rebounds, 5.6 assists, and 1.3 steals per game, and shot 85% from the free throw line.

=== Maccabi Tel Aviv (2022–2024) ===
Brown with Maccabi Tel Aviv (2022)

On June 29, 2022, Brown signed a two-year deal with Israeli club Maccabi Tel Aviv of the Israeli Basketball Premier League. In 2022–23, he averaged 29.0 minutes, 16.4 points, 2.7 rebounds, 5.7 assists, and 1.0 steals per game, and shot 89% from the free throw line.

In February, Brown signed a contract extension with Maccabi until the end of the 2025–26 season. In 2023-24 he averaged 26.8 minutes, 12.7 points, 2.9 rebounds, 5.6 assists, and 1.0 steals per game, and shot 79.5% from the free throw line

=== Panathinaikos (2024–2025) ===
On June 19, 2024, Brown agreed upon a three-year contract, worth €5.4 million (along with a €600,000 buyout compensation for Maccabi), with the reigning EuroLeague champions Panathinaikos. The deal was made official on June 25, 2024.

Despite the length of the contract, Brown left the club in 2025 following a season in which his performance did not meet expectations. As part of the agreement to terminate the contract early, Panathinaikos paid him a compensation of €700,000 to facilitate the move. In 2024-25, coming off the bench he averaged 17.0 minutes, 7.2 points, 2.0 rebounds, 3.3 assists, and 1.0 steals per game, and shot 45.3% from the field and 79.7% from the free throw line

=== Olimpia Milano (2025–present) ===
On July 12, 2025, Brown signed a multi-year contract with Italian powerhouse Olimpia Milano. In October 2025, Brown missed the opening two games of the Euroleague season due to a left thigh strain. In 2025-26, in 13 games he averaged 14.8 minutes, 6.4 points, 1.7 rebounds, 2.9 assists, and 0.9 steals per game, and shot 46.6% from the floor and sank all of his free throws.

==== Loan to Hapoel Jerusalem (2026–present) ====
On September 25, 2026, Brown was loaned to Hapoel Jerusalem of the Israeli Basketball Premier League until the end of 2026–27 season.

== National team career ==
After being a naturalization target for Croatia, Brown was granted Spanish citizenship in early July 2022 ahead of EuroBasket 2022. Brown stated that the prospect of being coached at the Spain national team by Sergio Scariolo—whom he had previously collaborated with at the Toronto Raptors—was the deciding factor the player chose Spain.

He represented Spain at EuroBasket 2022, winning gold in the final against France. He was subsequently named to the All-Tournament Team.

== Career statistics ==
Legend
GP	Games played	GS	Games started	MPG	Minutes per game
FG%	Field-goal percentage	3P%	3-point field-goal percentage	FT%	Free-throw percentage
RPG	Rebounds per game	APG	Assists per game	SPG	Steals per game
BPG	Blocks per game	PPG	Points per game	PIR	Performance index rating
**Bold**	Career high

=== NBA ===
==== Regular season ====
Year	Team	GP	GS	MPG	FG%	3P%	FT%	RPG	APG	SPG	BPG	PPG
2013–14	Philadelphia	26	0	8.6	.302	.100	.692	1.1	1.6	.5	.1	2.5
2014–15	Minnesota	**29**	**7**	**18.9**	**.426**	**.214**	.632	**2.4**	**3.1**	**1.0**	**.2**	**4.2**
2015–16	Phoenix	8	0	7.6	.320	.125	.750	.9	1.4	.4	.1	2.5
2017–18	Toronto	14	0	9.9	.412	.167	**1.000**	1.1	.9	.4	—	2.3
2018–19	Toronto	26	0	8.2	.324	**.214**	**1.000**	1.2	1.1	.5	**.2**	2.1
Career		103	7	11.5	.364	.170	.707	1.5	1.8	.6	.1	2.8

==== Playoffs ====
Year	Team	GP	GS	MPG	FG%	3P%	FT%	RPG	APG	SPG	BPG	PPG
2018	Toronto	4	0	7.3	.300	.400	.500	1.5	.5	—	.3	2.3
Career		4	0	7.3	.300	.400	.500	1.5	.5	—	.3	2.3

=== EuroLeague ===
Year	Team	GP	GS	MPG	FG%	3P%	FT%	RPG	APG	SPG	BPG	PPG	PIR
2019–20	Crvena zvezda	27	27	25.3	.417	.288	.823	3.3	4.6	1.1	**.4**	12.3	13.0
2020–21	Fenerbahçe	37	12	23.0	.423	.327	.804	2.2	3.5	1.3	—	9.5	8.6
2021–22	UNICS	24	23	29.4	**.488**	.322	.857	**3.4**	**6.1**	**1.5**	.2	13.8	**17.3**
2022–23	Maccabi Tel Aviv	35	35	**31.6**	.444	**.353**	**.911**	3.0	5.5	1.1	.1	**16.4**	16.1
2023–24	Maccabi Tel Aviv	**38**	**38**	29.3	.415	.345	.859	2.8	**6.1**	1.0	.1	13.2	13.1
Career		161	135	27.7	.435	.334	.856	2.9	5.1	1.2	.1	13.0	13.3

=== Domestic leagues ===
Year	Team	League	GP	MPG	FG%	3P%	FT%	RPG	APG	SPG	BPG	PPG
2013–14	(United States) Delaware 87ers	D-League	12	35.0	.468	.426	.804	5.2	6.9	1.7	.2	19.9
2013–14	(United States) Springfield Armor	D-League	8	25.3	.435	.211	.852	3.2	5.2	1.0	.6	13.4
2014–15	(United States) Grand Rapids Drive	D-League	19	31.8	.500	.382	.810	5.3	3.8	1.9	.3	16.8
2015–16	(United States) Grand Rapids Drive	D-League	25	33.3	.503	.352	.860	5.5	5.8	2.1	.3	18.3
2016–17	(United States) Grand Rapids Drive	D-League	11	35.8	.473	.353	.781	7.7	4.0	1.7	.4	23.6
2016–17	(China) Zhejiang G. B.	CBA	20	32.6	.457	.301	.804	7.4	5.5	2.6	.5	23.9
2017–18	(United States) Raptors 905	G League	32	33.2	.468	.330	.792	5.2	8.8	1.7	.2	18.7
2018–19	(China) Guangzhou L. L.	CBA	8	32.0	.592	.293	.800	5.4	4.9	2.7	.6	25.2
2019–20	(Serbia) Crvena zvezda	ABA	18	21.3	.503	.313	.917	2.7	6.3	1.4	.4	10.6
2020–21	(Turkey) Fenerbahçe	TBSL	20	23.8	.452	.346	.860	2.8	4.3	1.2	.1	11.9
2021–22	(Russia) UNICS	VTBUL	17	29.1	.423	.368	.850	3.7	5.0	1.0	.3	14.6
2022–23	(Israel) Maccabi Tel Aviv	Ligat HaAl	22	24.9	.393	.303	.849	2.1	6.1	.9	.1	11.2
2023–24	(Israel) Maccabi Tel Aviv	Ligat HaAl	23	22.6	.453	.412	.689	3.0	5.0	1.1	.0	11.6

=== College ===
Year	Team	GP	GS	MPG	FG%	3P%	FT%	RPG	APG	SPG	BPG	PPG
2010–11	NC State	31	26	28.8	.413	.298	.713	3.7	3.7	1.3	.4	9.3
2011–12	NC State	**37**	**37**	**34.3**	**.450**	**.351**	.729	**4.5**	6.3	1.8	.5	**12.7**
2012–13	NC State	33	32	34.2	.419	.263	**.771**	4.3	**7.2**	**2.0**	**.6**	12.4
Career		101	95	32.6	.429	.305	.741	4.2	5.8	1.7	.5	11.6
