= 2013–14 Israeli Basketball State Cup =

The 2013–14 Israeli Basketball State Cup was the 54th edition of the Israeli Basketball State Cup, organized by the Israel Basketball Association. The semifinals and finals were played at the Nokia Arena in Tel Aviv.

Maccabi Tel Aviv defeated Hapoel Eilat 80–73 in the final, successfully defending their title. It was Maccabi Tel Aviv's 40th Israeli State Cup and 5th in a row.

== Bracket ==
Second round
Maccabi Tel Aviv	83
Maccabi Ashdod	65
Bnei Herzliya	79
Hapoel Holon	73
Hapoel Afula	58
Maccabi Rishon LeZion	64
Elitzur Ramla	61
Hapoel Gilboa Galil	86
Maccabi Be'er Ya'akov	66
A.S. Ramat HaSharon	82
Hapoel Eilat	78
Maccabi Haifa	67
Ironi Nes Ziona	72
Hapoel Tel Aviv	82
Hapoel Galil Elyon	76
Hapoel Jerusalem	81

Quarterfinals
Maccabi Tel Aviv	76
Bnei Herzliya	58
Maccabi Rishon LeZion	84
Hapoel Gilboa Galil	77
A.S. Ramat HaSharon	103
Hapoel Eilat	107
Hapoel Tel Aviv	83
Hapoel Jerusalem	71

Semifinals
Maccabi Tel Aviv	99
Maccabi Rishon LeZion	83
Hapoel Eilat	82
Hapoel Tel Aviv	73

Final
Maccabi Tel Aviv	80
Hapoel Eilat	73

== Semifinals ==
3 February
20:45

Maccabi Tel Aviv	99–83	Maccabi Rishon LeZion

Nokia Arena, Tel Aviv

3 February
17:50

Hapoel Eilat	82–73	Hapoel Tel Aviv

Nokia Arena, Tel Aviv

== Final ==
6 February
20:45

Report

Maccabi Tel Aviv	80–73	Hapoel Eilat
Pts: Blu 22		Pts: Gates 15

Nokia Arena, Tel Aviv
Attendance: 2,000

== See also ==
- 2013–14 Israeli Basketball Super League
- Israeli Basketball State Cup
