= 2007–08 Israeli Basketball State Cup =

The Israeli Basketball State Cup 2007–08 was organized by the IBA. 24 teams that took part in the competition. The semifinals and finals were played at Yad Eliyahu Arena in Tel Aviv, Israel. Hapoel Jerusalem won their 4th cup title, beating Maccabi Tel Aviv 93-89 in the final.

== First Preliminary Round (07/10/07–10/10/07) ==
Hapoel Holon - Ironi Kiryat Ata 2:0 (106:84;89:79)

Maccabi Elizur Netanya - Beitar Biniamina 2:0 (92:70;77:62)

== Second Preliminary Round (21/10/07–24/10/07) ==
Hapoel Galil Elyon - Elizur Yavne 2:0 (105:94;89:70)

Hapoel Gilboa/Afula - Maccabi Shoham 2:0 (95:71;102:75)

Ironi Naharia - Maccabi Ashdod 2:0 (104:72;82:58)

Hapoel Holon - Elitzur Maccabi Netanya 2:0 (94:82;97:62)

Ironi Ramat Gan - Maccabi Givat Shmuel 2:0 (89:82;93:86)

- Hapoel Galil Elyon, Elizur Yavne, Hapoel Gilboa/Afula, Maccabi Shoham, Ironi Naharia, Maccabi Ashdod, Ironi Ramat Gan and Maccabi Givat Shmuel got a free card to the second preliminary round.

== Bracket ==
Quarter-finals
Maccabi Tel Aviv | 90 | 100
Hapoel Galil Elyon | 81 | 92
Hapoel Gilboa/Afula | 96 | 86
Ironi Naharia | 78 | 88
Hapoel Holon | 87 | 84
Ironi Ramat-Gan | 58 | 84
Hapoel Jerusalem | 83 | 77
Bnei Hasharon | 74 | 79

Semi-finals
Maccabi Tel Aviv | 92
Hapoel Gilboa/Afula | 83
Hapoel Holon | 100
Hapoel Jerusalem | 102

Final
Maccabi Tel Aviv | 89
Hapoel Jerusalem | 93

- Maccabi Tel Aviv, Hapoel Jerusalem and Bnei Hasharon got a free card to the Quarter-finals.
