= 2026 Israeli Basketball League Cup =

Israeli basketball pre-season tournament

Tournament details
- Country: Israel
- Dates: 8 September – 9 November 2026
- Teams: 14
- Defending champions: Hapoel Jerusalem

Final positions
- Champions: Maccabi Tel Aviv
- Runners-up: Hapoel Tel Aviv
- Semifinalists: Hapoel Jerusalem; Ironi Ness Ziona

Tournament statistics
- Matches played: 26

Awards
- MVP: (United States) Jimmy Clark III

The 2026 Israeli Basketball League Cup, for sponsorship reasons the Winner League Cup, is the 21st edition of the pre-season tournament of the Israeli Basketball Premier League. All of the fourteen Israeli Premier League teams participate. Both of the finalists from the 2025–26 Israeli Basketball Premier League, Maccabi Tel Aviv and Hapoel Tel Aviv, were given a bye to the quarter-final. Defending champions Hapoel Jerusalem entered the group phase without their star player and 2025 MVP Jared Harper, down with a thumb injury during training camp.

== Group stage ==
=== Group A ===
Pos	Team	Pld	W	L	GF	GA	GD	PCT	Qualification	HGE	HAM	MRG
1	Hapoel Galil Elyon	2	2	0	182	143	+39	1.000	Advance to Quarterfinals		83–61	
2	Hapoel HaEmek	2	1	1	138	158	−20	.500	Advance to Play-in			77–75
3	Maccabi Ironi Ramat Gan	2	0	2	157	176	−19	.000	Classification play-offs	82–99		

Legend: Blue = home team win; Red = away team win.

=== Group B ===
Pos	Team	Pld	W	L	GF	GA	GD	PCT	Qualification	INZ	IKA	HHO
1	Ironi Ness Ziona	2	2	0	175	166	+9	1.000	Advance to Quarterfinals			77–72
2	Ironi Kiryat Ata	2	1	1	177	177	0	.500	Advance to Play-in	94–98		
3	Hapoel Holon	2	0	2	151	160	−9	.000	Classification play-offs		79–83	

Legend: Blue = home team win; Red = away team win.

=== Group C ===
Pos	Team	Pld	W	L	GF	GA	GD	PCT	Qualification	BNE	MRL	HIE
1	Bnei Herzliya	2	2	0	200	177	+23	1.000	Advance to Quarterfinals		99–79	
2	Maccabi Rishon LeZion	2	1	1	166	184	−18	.500	Advance to Play-in			87–85
3	Hapoel Ironi Eilat	2	0	2	183	188	−5	.000	Classification play-offs	98–101		

Legend: Blue = home team win; Red = away team win.

=== Group D ===
Pos	Team	Pld	W	L	GF	GA	GD	PCT	Qualification	HJE	HBS	MAS
1	Hapoel Jerusalem	2	2	0	193	146	+47	1.000	Advance to Quarterfinals		83–69	
2	Hapoel Be'er Sheva/Dimona	2	1	1	172	184	−12	.500	Advance to Play-in			103–101
3	Maccabi Ashdod	2	0	2	178	213	−35	.000	Classification play-offs	77–110		

Legend: Blue = home team win; Red = away team win.

== Bracket ==
=== Main bracket ===
Play-in
23 September
Hapoel HaEmek	98
Ironi Kiryat Ata	99
22 September
Maccabi Rishon LeZion	75
Hapoel Be'er Sheva/Dimona	84

Quarterfinals
27 September
Maccabi Tel Aviv	109
Ironi Kiryat Ata	61
25 September
Hapoel Jerusalem	88
Bnei Herzliya	68
26 September
Hapoel Tel Aviv	85
Hapoel Be'er Sheva/Dimona	67
28 September
Ironi Ness Ziona	78
Hapoel Galil Elyon	70

Semifinals
4 October
Maccabi Tel Aviv	88
Hapoel Jerusalem	71
3 October
Hapoel Tel Aviv	79
Ironi Ness Ziona	76

Final
9 November
Maccabi Tel Aviv	86
Hapoel Tel Aviv	75

=== 11–14th classification bracket ===
11–14th play-offs
23 September
Hapoel Holon	83
Maccabi Ironi Ramat Gan	80
27 September
Hapoel Ironi Eilat	75
Maccabi Ashdod	55

11–12th match
30 September
Hapoel Holon	87
Hapoel Ironi Eilat	85
13–14th match
5 October
Maccabi Ironi Ramat Gan	84
Maccabi Ashdod	89

=== 9–10th classification bracket ===
9–10th match
29 September
Hapoel HaEmek	80
Maccabi Rishon LeZion	59

== 11–14th classification play-offs ==
23 September	Hapoel Holon	83–80	Maccabi Ironi Ramat Gan	Holon
18:40	Scoring by quarter: 15–22, 25–17, 21–19, 22–22
	Pts: Harris Jr. 24; Rebs: Sanogo 10; Asts: Harris Jr., Artzi 6 PIR: Harris Jr. 25	Boxscore	Pts: Figueroa 28; Rebs: Figueroa 7 Asts: Caver 4 PIR: Figueroa 39	Arena: Holon Toto Hall; Attendance: 800; Referees: Amit Balak, Nir Meirson, Ofek Kirshenbaum

27 September	Hapoel Ironi Eilat	75–55	Maccabi Ashdod	Eilat
18:30	Scoring by quarter: 20–10, 24–14, 17–18, 14–13
	Pts: Dickey 17; Rebs: Dickey 8 Asts: McCullum, Sznajderman 5 PIR: Dickey 21	Boxscore	Pts: Callahan-Gold 15; Rebs: Ben David 7 Asts: Hill 4 PIR: Dawson 16	Arena: Begin Arena; Attendance: 500; Referees: Elad Leibovich, Assaf Engelberg, Said Khoury

=== 11–12th classification match ===
30 September	Hapoel Holon	87–85	Hapoel Ironi Eilat	Holon
20:00	Scoring by quarter: 21–27, 17–23, 23–13, 26–22
	Pts: Artzi 20; Rebs: Artzi 8 Asts: Kravitz 6 PIR: Artzi 28	Boxscore	Pts: Crawford, McCullum 12; Rebs: Lieb 8 Asts: McCullum 6 PIR: McCullum 17	Arena: Holon Toto Hall; Attendance: 950; Referees: Omer Wasserman, Or Zrur, Ofek Kirshenbaum

=== 13–14th classification match ===
5 October	Maccabi Ironi Ramat Gan	84–89	Maccabi Ashdod	Ramat Gan
19:40	Scoring by quarter: 19–27, 22–17, 27–19, 16–26
	Pts: Figueroa 28; Rebs: Lewis 8 Asts: Washington 7 PIR: Figueroa 21	Boxscore	Pts: Turner 26; Rebs: Wahab 10; Asts: Turner, Hill 4 PIR: Turner 26	Arena: Zisman Arena; Attendance: 100; Referees: Omer Esteron, Kfir Mualem, Ron Man

== Play-in ==
22 September	Maccabi Rishon LeZion	75–84	Hapoel Be'er Sheva/Dimona	Rishon LeZion
20:55	Scoring by quarter: 24–29, 17–6, 18–25, 16–24
	Pts: King 17; Rebs: King 8 Asts: Grant 4 PIR: Grant 19	Boxscore	Pts: Cabbil 32; Rebs: Smith 7 Asts: Cabbil 6 PIR: Cabbil 42	Arena: Beit Maccabi; Attendance: 800; Referees: Sefi Shemesh, Zahi Habdali, Or Zrur

23 September	Hapoel HaEmek	98–99(OT)	Ironi Kiryat Ata	Haim Ohayon Sports Hall
20:55	Scoring by quarter: 30–18, 14–25, 24–21, 16–20, Overtime: 14–15
	Pts: Misgav 20; Rebs: Hall, Elleby 9 Asts: Misgav 8 PIR: Misgav 27	Boxscore	Pts: Sharon 22; Rebs: Sharon 9 Asts: Woods 7 PIR: Sharon 29	Arena: Gan Ner; Referees: Adar Pe'er, Harel Kidron, David Izmirli

=== 9–10th classification match ===
29 September	Hapoel HaEmek	80–59	Maccabi Rishon LeZion	Kiryat Ata
18:30	Scoring by quarter: 23–12, 19–16, 23–17, 15–14
	Pts: Henry 26; Rebs: Three players 5 Asts: Misgav 7 PIR: Henry 29	Boxscore	Pts: Jenkins 22; Rebs: Zalmanson 10; Asts: Jenkins, Grant 3 PIR: Jenkins 30	Arena: Ramaz Hall; Referees: Ofer Manheim, Assaf Engelberg, Yuval Delbaha

== Quarterfinals ==
27 September	Maccabi Tel Aviv	109–61	Ironi Kiryat Ata	Hadera
19:00	Scoring by quarter: 18–18, 36–18, 25–8, 30–17
	Pts: Theis 15; Rebs: Rayman 8 Asts: Clark III 7 PIR: Leaf 21	Boxscore	Pts: Green 15; Rebs: Sharon 8 Asts: Woods 4 PIR: Sharon 14	Arena: Enerbox; Attendance: 1,712; Referees: Zahi Habdali, Kfir Mualem, Idan Stein

26 September	Hapoel Tel Aviv	85–67	Hapoel Be'er Sheva/Dimona	Hadera
20:55	Scoring by quarter: 27–19, 15–10, 19–15, 24–23
	Pts: Odiase 15; Rebs: Odiase 9 Asts: Three players 3 PIR: Odiase 27	Boxscore	Pts: Cabbil 16; Rebs: Coleman 12; Asts: Doron 5 PIR: Coleman 20	Arena: Enerbox; Attendance: 712; Referees: Ofer Manheim, Noam Gordon, Lior Beynish

25 September	Hapoel Jerusalem	88–68	Bnei Herzliya	Hadera
14:00	Scoring by quarter: 28–20, 13–9, 24–13, 23–26
	Pts: Lofton Jr. 17; Rebs: Lofton Jr. 10; Asts: Lofton Jr. 6 PIR: Lofton Jr. 27	Boxscore	Pts: Gershon 15; Rebs: Burns 9 Asts: Bryant 9 PIR: Bryant 23	Arena: Enerbox; Attendance: 927; Referees: Sefi Shemesh, Guy Shmueli, Rotem Koza

28 September	Ironi Ness Ziona	78–70	Hapoel Galil Elyon	Hadera
20:00	Scoring by quarter: 23–16, 21–10, 17–28, 17–16
	Pts: Smith 18; Rebs: Gillespie 8 Asts: Weisz, Lee 5 PIR: Lee 21	Boxscore	Pts: Kingz 29; Rebs: Kemp 8 Asts: Moskovits 4 PIR: Kingz 32	Arena: Enerbox; Attendance: 521; Referees: Omer Esteron, Ori Shalhavi, Nir Keren

== Semifinals ==
3 October	Hapoel Tel Aviv	79–76	Ironi Ness Ziona	Holon
20:55	Scoring by quarter: 19–23, 21–14, 24–20, 15–19
	Pts: Blakeney 21; Rebs: Caboclo 6 Asts: German 4 PIR: Blakeney 20	Boxscore	Pts: Christopher 17; Rebs: Rowe 11; Asts: Christopher 4 PIR: Rowe 22	Arena: Holon Toto Hall; Attendance: 1,038; Referees: Dan Yalon, Noam Gordon, Nir Keren

4 October	Maccabi Tel Aviv	88–71	Hapoel Jerusalem	Holon
19:00	Scoring by quarter: 15–16, 16–16, 28–22, 29–17
	Pts: Brissett 17; Rebs: Hoard 6 Asts: Lundberg, Madar 4 PIR: Sorkin 22	Boxscore	Pts: Lofton Jr. 16; Rebs: Cacok 12; Asts: Milton 5 PIR: Cacok, Lofton Jr. 19	Arena: Holon Toto Hall; Attendance: 4,781; Referees: Sefi Shemesh, Nir Meirson, Omer Wasserman

== Final ==
9 November	Maccabi Tel Aviv	86–75	Hapoel Tel Aviv	Holon
20:55	Scoring by quarter: 26–17, 10–27, 15–18, 35–13
	Pts: Clark 24; Rebs: Madar 6 Asts: Clark 7 PIR: Clark 28	Boxscore	Pts: German 26; Rebs: Ginat 7 Asts: Ginat 6 PIR: German 24	Arena: Holon Toto Hall; Attendance: 5,026; Referees: Sefi Shemesh, Ofer Manheim, Dvir Rainisch

Starters:			Pts	Reb	Ast
PF	1	(France) Jaylen Hoard	12	4	3
PG	26	(Israel) Yam Madar	10	6	3
F/C	9	(Israel) Roman Sorkin	6	2	0
G	12	(Israel) John DiBartolomeo	0	4	3
F	10	(Canada) Oshae Brissett	0	3	0
Reserves:					
G	2	(United States) Jimmy Clark III	24	3	7
G	17	(United States) Keaton Wallace	16	5	2
C	23	(Germany) Daniel Theis	16	4	0
F	11	(Israel) Will Rayman	2	2	1
F/C	22	(Israel) T. J. Leaf	0	4	0
Head coach:
(Israeli Basketball Association) Oded Kattash

M. Tel Aviv	H. Tel Aviv

M. Tel Aviv	Statistics	H. Tel Aviv
18/38 (47%)	2 point field goals	16/34 (47%)
12/29 (41%)	3 point field goals	10/25 (40%)
14/17 (82%)	Free throws	13/22 (59%)
38	Rebounds	39
19	Assists	17
12	Steals	9
11	Turnovers	16
3	Blocks	1

Starters:			Pts	Reb	Ast
PG	1	(United States) Eugene German	26	1	3
G/F	3	(United States) Elijah Bryant	7	6	4
C	25	(Nigeria) Daniel Oturu	7	5	0
PF	41	(Israel) Tomer Ginat	6	7	6
PG	10	(Israel) Bar Timor	0	2	0
Reserves:					
SG	2	(United States) Antonio Blakeney	8	6	6
G	5	(Israel) Khadeen Carrington	8	0	0
C	21	(Puerto Rico) Tai Odiase	7	5	0
F	14	(Israel) Oz Blayzer	3	1	0
PG	45	(Israel) Tamir Blatt	3	0	1
F/C	6	(Israel) Itay Segev	0	0	0
G	9	(Israel) Guy Palatin	0	0	0
Head coach:
(Hellenic Basketball Federation) Dimitris Itoudis

2026 League Cup Winners
Maccabi Tel Aviv
12^{th} title

== Final rankings ==
R	Team
1st place, gold medalist(s)	Maccabi Tel Aviv
2nd place, silver medalist(s)	Hapoel Tel Aviv
3–4	Hapoel Jerusalem
3–4	Ironi Ness Ziona
5–8	Bnei Herzliya
5–8	Hapoel Be'er Sheva/Dimona
5–8	Hapoel Galil Elyon
5–8	Ironi Kiryat Ata
9	Hapoel HaEmek
10	Maccabi Rishon LeZion
11	Hapoel Holon
12	Hapoel Ironi Eilat
13	Maccabi Ashdod
14	Maccabi Ironi Ramat Gan
