= 2006 Israeli Basketball League Cup =

Israeli basketball pre-season tournament

Tournament details
- Arena: Malha Arena; Jerusalem
- Dates: 15–19 October 2006

Final positions
- Champions: Ironi Ashkelon (1st title)
- Runners-up: Maccabi Rishon LeZion

Awards and statistics
- MVP: (Israel) Guy Kantor

Winner Cup 2006 is the 1st edition of the Israeli basketball pre-season tournament - Winner Cup. It was played on 15 October-19 October in Jerusalem at the Malha Arena, during the jewish holiday of Sukkot. Ironi Ashkelon has won the cup after beating Maccabi Rishon LeZion 79-73 in the final.

== Withdrawals ==
The teams that finished at the top eight places on Basketball Super League 2005–06 were supposed to compete in the tournament.

Maccabi Tel Aviv that finished 1st in the 2005-06 season has withdrawn from the tournament due to schedule problems.

Hapoel Tel Aviv that finished on the 8th place was relegated to the 2nd division due to financial problems and was not eligible to compete in the tournament.

The both teams were replaced by the 9th and 10th ranked teams - Bnei HaSharon and Ironi Ramat Gan, respectively.

== Tournament Bracket ==
The teams were matched by their last season standings (2nd VS 10th, 3rd VS 9th, etc...).

Quarter-finals
Ironi Nahariya	77
Maccabi Giv'at Shmuel	87
Maccabi Rishon LeZion	77
Bnei HaSharon	76
Ironi Ashkelon	101
Hapoel Galil Elyon	85
Ironi Ramat Gan	72
Hapoel Jerusalem	83

Semi-finals
Maccabi Giv'at Shmuel	102
Maccabi Rishon LeZion	109
Ironi Ashkelon	65
Hapoel Jerusalem	60

Final
Maccabi Rishon LeZion	73
Ironi Ashkelon	79
Third place
Maccabi Giv'at Shmuel	89
Hapoel Jerusalem	93

== Results ==
=== Quarter-finals ===
15 October
17:30

Report

Ironi Nahariya	77–87	Maccabi Giv'at Shmuel
Scoring by quarter: 20-21, 23-19, 13-23, 21-24
Pts: Ben David 18; Rebs: Kozikaro 8 Asts: Limonad 6		Pts: Davis 26; Rebs: Wallace 10; Asts: Straight 8

Malha Arena

15 October
20:00

Report

Ironi Ramat Gan	72–83	Hapoel Jerusalem
Scoring by quarter: 21-28, 16-25, 15-14, 20-16
Pts: Allen 30; Rebs: Louis, Allen 6 Asts: McCants 12		Pts: Austin 18; Rebs: Golemac, Austin 7 Asts: Austin 5

Malha Arena

16 October
17:30

Report

Ironi Ashkelon	101–85	Hapoel Galil Elyon
Scoring by quarter: 10-22, 33-15, 19-26, 39-22
Pts: Eitan 31; Rebs: Miles 15; Asts: Hatten, Miles 7		Pts: Casspi 24; Rebs: Blloberk, Stockman 6 Asts: Rot 7

Malha Arena

16 October
20:00

Report

Maccabi Rishon LeZion	77–76	Bnei HaSharon
Scoring by quarter: 21-16, 19-17, 23-13, 14-30
Pts: Shimonovich 19; Rebs: Shimonovich 12; Asts: Kantor, Tolbert, Shimonovich 4		Pts: Williams, Cisse 15; Rebs: Cisse 13; Asts: Katz 5

Malha Arena

=== Semi-finals ===
18 October

Report

Maccabi Rishon LeZion	109–102 (90-90)	Maccabi Giv'at Shmuel
Scoring by quarter: 17-27, 29-19, 22-23, 22-21, Overtime: 19-12
Pts: Kantor, Moore 21; Rebs: Moore 12; Asts: Sidney 8		Pts: Straight 29; Rebs: Wallace 16; Asts: Davis 5

Malha Arena

18 October

Report

Hapoel Jerusalem	60–65	Ironi Ashkelon
Scoring by quarter: 22-14, 19-19, 9-17, 10-15
Pts: Bowers 19; Rebs: Golemac, Bowers 9 Asts: Golemac 8		Pts: Hatten 20; Rebs: Miles 8 Asts: Colman 5

Malha Arena

=== Third-place game ===
19 October

Report

Hapoel Jerusalem	93–89	Maccabi Giv'at Shmuel
Scoring by quarter: 18-22, 24-15, 29-21, 22-30
Pts: Bowers 20		Pts: Davis 35

Malha Arena

=== Final ===
19 October

Report

Maccabi Rishon LeZion	73–79	Ironi Ashkelon
Scoring by quarter: 27-18, 12-26, 17-15, 17-20
Pts: Tolbert 27; Rebs: Moore 10; Asts: Moore 3		Pts: Eitan 17; Rebs: Hatten 13; Asts: Hatten 5

Malha Arena
