= 2024 Israeli Basketball League Cup =

Israeli basketball pre-season tournament

Tournament details
- Country: Israel
- Dates: 8 September–17 November 2024
- Teams: 14
- Defending champions: Hapoel Jerusalem

Final positions
- Champions: Maccabi Tel Aviv
- Runners-up: Maccabi Ironi Ramat Gan
- Semifinalists: Bnei Herzliya; Hapoel Holon

Tournament statistics
- Matches played: 25

Awards
- MVP: (France) (United States) Jaylen Hoard
- All statistics correct as of 27 September 2024.

The 2024 Israeli Basketball League Cup, for sponsorships reasons the Winner League Cup, was the 19th edition of the pre-season tournament of the Israeli Basketball Premier League. Fourteen Israeli Premier League team's participate. The tournament has been changed and instead of the round of 16 there was a group stage. Each group consisted of four teams.

== Group stage ==
=== Group A ===
Pos	Team	Pld	W	L	GF	GA	GD	PCT	Qualification	HHO	IKA	HAF	HBS
1	Hapoel Holon	3	3	0	248	217	+31	1.000	Advance to Quarterfinals	—	90–74	—	—
2	Ironi Kiryat Ata	3	2	1	250	223	+27	.667	Advance to Quarterfinals	—	—	—	85–66
3	Hapoel Afula	3	1	2	220	244	−24	.333		67–75	67–91	—	—
4	Hapoel Be'er Sheva/Dimona	3	0	3	220	254	−34	.000		76–83	—	78–86	—

=== Group B ===
Pos	Team	Pld	W	L	GF	GA	GD	PCT	Qualification	BNE	MRG	HHA	ENE
1	Bnei Herzliya	3	3	0	243	214	+29	1.000	Advance to Quarterfinals	—	81–69	78–66	—
2	Maccabi Ironi Ramat Gan	3	2	1	240	217	+23	.667	Advance to Quarterfinals	—	—	96–81	—
3	Hapoel Haifa	3	1	2	228	243	−15	.333		—	—	—	81–69
4	Elitzur Netanya	3	0	3	203	240	−37	.000		79–85	55–75	—	—

=== Group C ===
Pos	Team	Pld	W	L	GF	GA	GD	PCT	Qualification	HJE	INZ	HGE	HGG
1	Hapoel Jerusalem	3	3	0	259	230	+29	1.000	Advance to Quarterfinals	—	94–84	75–66	—
2	Ironi Ness Ziona	3	1	2	239	244	−5	.333	Advance to Quarterfinals	—	—	89–65	—
3	Hapoel Galil Elyon	3	1	2	218	227	−9	.333		—	—	—	87–63
4	Hapoel Gilboa Galil	3	1	2	228	243	−15	.333		80–90	85–66	—	—

== Bracket ==
Quarterfinals; 21–24 September
21 September, 20:45
Hapoel Tel Aviv	102
Maccabi Ironi Ramat Gan	109
22 September, 20:50
Hapoel Jerusalem	79
Bnei Herzliya	83
24 September, 20:50
Maccabi Tel Aviv	94
Ironi Kiryat Ata	67
23 September, 20:00
Hapoel Holon	81
Ironi Ness Ziona	68

Semifinals; 27 September
27 September, 12:40
Maccabi Ironi Ramat Gan	99
Bnei Herzliya	89
27 September, 15:10
Maccabi Tel Aviv	82
Hapoel Holon	57

Final; 17 November
17 November, 19:15
Maccabi Tel Aviv	86
Maccabi Ironi Ramat Gan	83

== Quarterfinals ==
21 September	Hapoel Tel Aviv	102–109(OT)	Maccabi Ironi Ramat Gan	Holon
20:45	Scoring by quarter: 24–12, 19–21, 24–24, 21–31, Overtime: 21–14
	Pts: Ragland 21; Rebs: Caboclo 15; Asts: Ragland 12; PIR: Caboclo 30	Boxscore	Pts: Stevens 30; Rebs: Stevens 9 Asts: Huber 10; PIR: Stevens 30	Arena: Holon Toto Hall; Attendance: 3,550; Referees: Sefi Shemesh, Ori Shalhavi, Omer Wasserman

22 September	Hapoel Jerusalem	79–83	Bnei Herzliya	Holon
20:50	Scoring by quarter: 14–25, 21–22, 31–14, 13–22
	Pts: Harper 23; Rebs: Smith 8 Asts: Smith 6 PIR: Harper 22	Boxscore	Pts: Meeks 20; Rebs: Hawley 9 Asts: Clark 4 PIR: Meeks 20	Arena: Holon Toto Hall; Attendance: 700; Referees: Dan Yalon, Elad Leibovich, Elias Abu Arab

23 September	Hapoel Holon	81–66	Ironi Ness Ziona	Holon
20:00	Scoring by quarter: 20–11, 17–28, 14–15, 30–12
	Pts: Bingham Jr. 19; Rebs: Kyser 8 Asts: Misgav 10; PIR: Bingham Jr. 19	Boxscore	Pts: Brown 19; Rebs: Van Tubbergen 14; Asts: Edge 4 PIR: Brown 19	Arena: Holon Toto Hall; Attendance: 1,430; Referees: Omer Esteron, Rotem Kuza, Nir Keren

24 September	Maccabi Tel Aviv	94–67	Ironi Kiryat Ata	Holon
20:50	Scoring by quarter: 18–18, 33–14, 26–23, 17–12
	Pts: Jokubaitis 15; Rebs: Sorkin 9 Asts: Cohen 4 PIR: Sorkin & Jokubaitis 15	Boxscore	Pts: De Sousa 17; Rebs: De Sousa 9 Asts: O'Reilly 5 PIR: De Sousa 22	Arena: Holon Toto Hall; Attendance: 1,124; Referees: Nir Meirson, Or Zrur, Said Khoury

== Semifinals ==
27 September	Maccabi Ironi Ramat Gan	99–89	Bnei Herzliya	Holon
12:40	Scoring by quarter: 17–20, 21–20, 38–23, 23–26
	Pts: Stevens 27; Rebs: Three players 7 Asts: McCullum 10; PIR: Stevens 33	Boxscore	Pts: Silva 21; Rebs: Hawley 8 Asts: Burg 6 PIR: Silva 24	Arena: Holon Toto Hall; Attendance: 1,200; Referees: Omer Esteron, David Kolangi, Harel Kidron

27 September	Maccabi Tel Aviv	82–57	Hapoel Holon	Holon
15:10	Scoring by quarter: 22–17, 29–19, 15–18, 16–21
	Pts: Rivero 15; Rebs: Three players 6 Asts: Blatt 12; PIR: Rivero 17	Boxscore	Pts: Bingham Jr. 24; Rebs: Bingham Jr. & Adams 7 Asts: Adams 6 PIR: Bingham Jr. 32	Arena: Holon Toto Hall; Referees: Amit Balak, Adar Pe'er, Tzur Tuval

== Final ==
17 November	Maccabi Tel Aviv	86–83	Maccabi Ironi Ramat Gan	Holon
19:15	Scoring by quarter: 25–16, 23–20, 13–26, 25–21
	Pts: Randolph 18; Rebs: Hoard 12; Asts: Randolph 4 PIR: Hoard 25	Boxscore	Pts: Huber 16; Rebs: Miles 6 Asts: Huber 8 PIR: Huber 22	Arena: Holon Toto Hall; Referees: Amit Balak, Zahi Habdali, Dvir Rainisch

Starters:			Pts	Reb	Ast
PF	1	(France) Jaylen Hoard	17	12	3
G/F	20	(United States) Levi Randolph	18	5	4
G	12	(Israel) John DiBartolomeo	11	2	2
F/C	9	(Israel) Roman Sorkin	8	4	1
PG	45	(Israel) Tamir Blatt	8	0	2
Reserves:					
PG	55	(United States) David DeJulius	15	1	1
PF	11	(Israel) Will Rayman	3	5	1
F/C	32	(South Sudan) Wenyen Gabriel	2	4	0
SF	8	(Israel) Rafi Menco	2	3	1
PG	31	(Lithuania) Rokas Jokubaitis	2	2	2
PG	10	(Israel) Omer Mayer	0	0	0
F/C	15	(Israel) Jake Cohen	0	0	0
Head coach:
(Israeli Basketball Association) Oded Kattash

M. Tel Aviv	M. I. Ramat Gan

M. Tel Aviv	Statistics	M. I. Ramat Gan
20/44 (45%)	2 point field goals	20/41 (49%)
10/27 (37%)	3 point field goals	10/25 (40%)
16/17 (94%)	Free throws	13/18 (72%)
41	Rebounds	37
17	Assists	22
8	Steals	6
14	Turnovers	13
4	Blocks	6

Starters:			Pts	Reb	Ast
F/C	3	(United States) Amin Stevens	15	5	2
PG	10	(United States) Kendale McCullum	11	5	6
F	11	(Israel) Adam Ariel	11	3	3
F	15	(United States) Isaiah Miles	6	6	1
G	44	(United States) Roberto Gallinat	3	0	0
Reserves:					
PG	13	(Israel) Roi Huber	16	4	8
G/F	22	(United States) Drew Crawford	10	4	0
C	23	(Israel) Benaya Srour	9	5	2
F	12	(Israel) Yahal Melamed	2	0	0
G/F	6	(Israel) Dori Sahar	0	0	0
Head coach:
(Israeli Basketball Association) Shmulik Brenner

2024 League Cup Winners
Maccabi Tel Aviv
11^{th} title
