= 2008 Israeli Basketball League Cup =

Israeli basketball pre-season tournament

Tournament details
- Arena: Malha Arena / Gan Ner Arena; Jerusalem / Gan Ner
- Dates: 12 October–16 October 2008

Final positions
- Champions: Hapoel Jerusalem (1st title)
- Runners-up: Ironi Nahariya

Awards and statistics
- MVP: (United States) Timmy Bowers

The 2008 Israeli Basketball League Cup, for sponsorship reasons Winner Cup 2008 (Hebrew: גביע ווינר, Gevi'a Winner), was the 3rd edition of the Israeli Basketball League Cup pre-season tournament. It was played between 12 October and 16 October at Malha Arena in Jerusalem and at Gan Ner Arena in Gan Ner. Hapoel Jerusalem has won the cup after beating Ironi Nahariya 84-69 in the final. MVP was Timmy Bowers (Hapoel Jerusalem).

== Tournament bracket ==
The teams were seeded according to their last season standings.

Quarterfinals; 12 October
1	Hapoel Holon	62
3	Bnei HaSharon	82
5	Hapoel Jerusalem	87
6	Ironi Ashkelon	81
8	Gilboa/Galil	79
2	Maccabi Tel Aviv	77
4	Ironi Nahariya	90
7	Ironi Ramat Gan	77

Semifinals; 15 October
5	Hapoel Jerusalem	101
3	Bnei HaSharon	75
8	Gilboa/Galil	64
4	Ironi Nahariya	93

Final; 16 October
5	Hapoel Jerusalem	84
4	Ironi Nahariya	69
Third place
8	Gilboa/Galil	82
3	Bnei HaSharon	79
