= Moran Roth =

Israeli basketball player (born 1982)

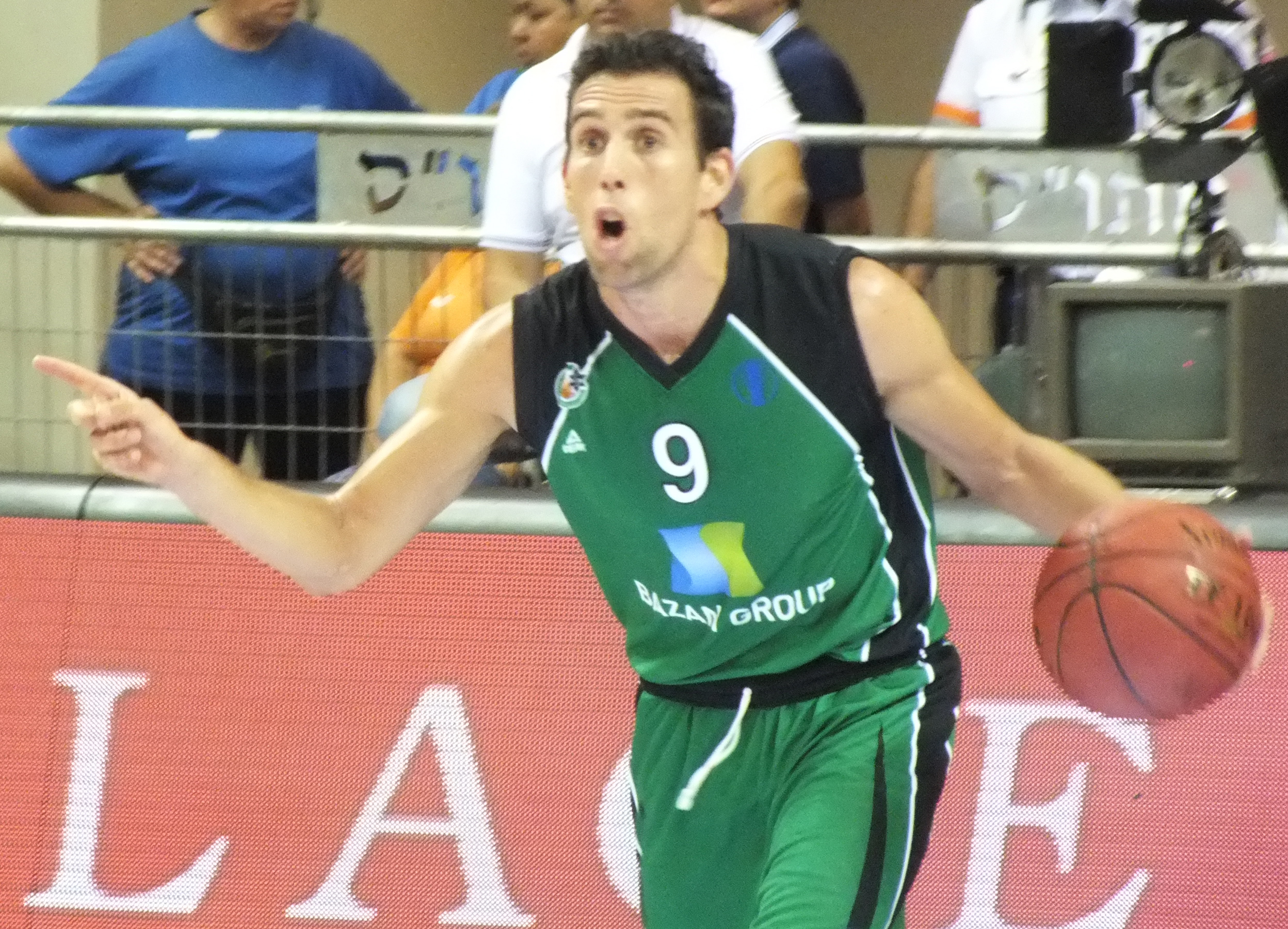

Free agent
- Position: Point guard

Personal information
- Born: November 10, 1982 (age 44) Ashdod, Israel
- Listed height: 6 ft 0 in (1.83 m)
- Listed weight: 185 lb (84 kg)

Career information
- High school: Kiryat Sharet (Holon)
- Playing career: 2000–2016

Career history
- 2000–2001: Hapoel Be'eri
- 2001–2002: Maccabi Ashdod
- 2002–2004: Elitzur Ramla
- 2004–2005: Ramat Hasharon
- 2005–2006: Maccabi Rishon LeZion
- 2006–2007: Hapoel Galil Elyon
- 2007: Ironi Ramat Gan
- 2007–2008: Hapoel Holon
- 2008–2009: Hapoel Jerusalem
- 2009–2010: Elitzur Ashkelon
- 2010–2012: Hapoel Holon
- 2012–2013: Maccabi Tel Aviv
- 2013–2014: Maccabi Haifa
- 2014: Ironi Nes Ziona
- 2014–2015: Maccabi Haifa
- 2015–2016: Bnei Herzliya

Career highlights
- Israeli League champion (2008); Israeli Cup winner (2013); 2× Israeli League Cup winner (2009, 2012); 2× All-Israeli League First Team (2011, 2012); Israeli League Rising Star (2005); Israeli League Assists Leader (2012)

Moran Roth (Hebrew: מורן רוט; born November 10, 1982) is an Israeli professional basketball player who last played with Bnei Herzliya of the Israeli Super League. He plays at the point guard position. He won the Israeli Super League championship with Hapoel Holon, in the 2007–08 season. In 2012, he was the Israeli Premier League Assists Leader.

== Professional career ==
After finishing his youth career at the youth systems of Maccabi Tel Aviv, Roth signed with Hapoel Be'eri of the Israeli third-tier level Liga Artzit. After one year at the third-tier level, Roth played three seasons in the Israeli second-tier level Liga Leumit - one with his hometown team Maccabi Ashdod, and two with Elitzur Ramla.

His performance at the Israeli second league earned him his first Israeli top-tier level Israeli Premier League contract, with A.S. Ramat Hasharon. At the end of his first season with the club, he won the Israeli Super League's Discovery of the Year award, after averaging 7.0 points and 2.7 assists per game.

He signed with Maccabi Rishon LeZion, for the 2005–06 season, and finished with the team in third place in the league.

Roth split the 2006–07 season between Hapoel Galil Elyon and Ironi Ramat Gan.

In the next season, Roth was a key player in the sensational Israeli Super League championship winning team Hapoel Holon, which ended what was at the time a run of 14 consecutive league championships by Maccabi Tel Aviv. In that season, Roth averaged 4.6 assists per game.

After the sensational league championship with Hapoel Holon, Roth signed a contract with the traditional second-best team in Israel, Hapoel Jerusalem.

He split ways with Hapoel Jerusalem after just one season, and signed with Elitzur Ashkelon, for the 2009–10 season.

In June 2010, Roth returned to Hapoel Holon, signing a 2-year contract with them. That season, Roth averaged then career highs of 13.5 points and 5.9 assists per game, which earned him a place in the All-BSL First Team, although his team only finished in 7th place in the Israeli Super League, and was eliminated in the playoff quarterfinals.

The second year of his contract with Hapoel Holon was more successful on the team level, as they finished the season in third place. Roth led the league in assists, with an average of 7.95 per game, and also had two games in which he had 15 assists during the season.

After two good seasons with Hapoel Holon, Roth signed a 3-year contract with the Israeli EuroLeague powerhouse Maccabi Tel Aviv.

Roth parted ways with Maccabi Tel Aviv after only one year due, to a lack of playing time with the team. He then signed with the Israeli Super League's defending champions, Maccabi Haifa, as a replacement for Gal Mekel, who had moved to the NBA.

== National team ==
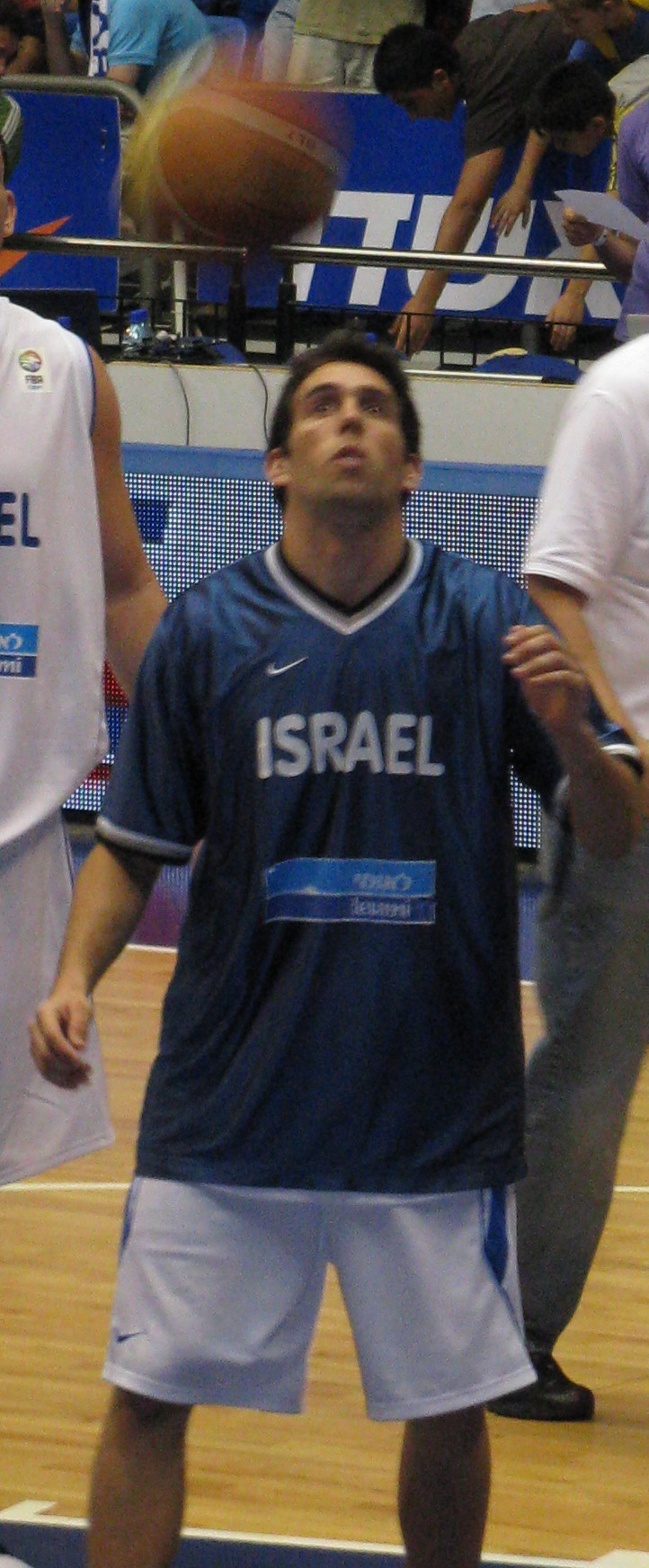
Roth with the Israeli National Team

Roth became a member of the senior Israeli National Basketball Team since 2007. He played at the EuroBasket 2007 and the EuroBasket 2009

== Career stats ==
=== EuroLeague ===
| Year | Team | GP | GS | MPG | FG% | 3P% | FT% | RPG | APG | SPG | BPG | PPG | PIR |
|---|---|---|---|---|---|---|---|---|---|---|---|---|---|
| 2012–13 | Maccabi Tel Aviv | 18 | 0 | 6.0 | .333 | .333 | .625 | .6 | 1.2 | .2 | .0 | 1.2 | 1.2 |
