= 2007 Israeli Basketball League Cup =

Israeli basketball pre-season tournament

Tournament details
- Arena: Malha Arena; Jerusalem
- Dates: 14 October–18 October 2007

Final positions
- Champions: Maccabi Tel Aviv (1st title)
- Runners-up: Hapoel Jerusalem

Awards and statistics
- MVP: (Israel) David Bluthenthal

The 2007 Israeli Basketball League Cup, for sponsorship reasons Winner Cup 2007, was the 2nd edition of the Israeli basketball pre-season tournament. It was played on 14 October-18 October in Jerusalem at the Malha Arena, during the jewish holiday of Sukkot. Maccabi Tel Aviv has won the cup after beating Hapoel Jerusalem 93-74 in the final. MVP was David Bluthenthal (Maccabi Tel Aviv).

== Teams participating ==
For the first time, all the teams that finished at the top eight places on the Israeli Premier League 2006-07 competed in the tournament.

The 9th ranked team, Ironi Ashkelon, and the new promoted team, Hapoel Holon, have played a non-deciding exhibition game as part of the event.

== Tournament bracket ==
The teams were matched by their last season standings (1st VS 8th, 2nd VS 8th, etc...).

Quarter-finals
1	Maccabi Tel Aviv	94
Maccabi Rishon LeZion	81
4	Hapoel Galil Elyon	85
Hapoel Gilboa/Afula	89
3	Bnei HaSharon	77
Ironi Nahariya	81
2	Hapoel Jerusalem	90
Ironi Ramat Gan	70

Semi-finals
Maccabi Tel Aviv	78
Hapoel Gilboa/Afula	67
Ironi Nahariya	68
Hapoel Jerusalem	95

Final
Maccabi Tel Aviv	93
Hapoel Jerusalem	74
Third place
Hapoel Gilboa/Afula	83
Ironi Nahariya	82
