= 2010 Israeli Basketball League Cup =

Israeli basketball pre-season tournament

Tournament details
- Arena: Malha Arena; Jerusalem
- Dates: 10–14 October 2010

Final positions
- Champions: Maccabi Tel Aviv (2nd title)
- Runners-up: Hapoel Jerusalem

Awards and statistics
- MVP: (United States) Jeremy Pargo

The 2010 Israeli Basketball League Cup was the 5th edition of the Israeli Basketball League Cup pre-season tournament. It was played between October 10 and October 14 at Malha Arena in Jerusalem. Maccabi Tel Aviv has won the cup after beating Hapoel Jerusalem 87–77 in the final. MVP was Jeremy Pargo (Maccabi Tel Aviv).

== Tournament Bracket ==
The teams were seeded according to their last season standings.

Quarterfinals
1	Gilboa/Galil	77
8	Bnei HaSharon	70
October 10
3	Hapoel Jerusalem	83
6	Ironi Ashkelon	80
2	Maccabi Tel Aviv	93
7	Maccabi Rishon LeZion	54
October 11
4	Baraq Netanya	82
10	Hapoel Holon	69

Semifinals; October 13
1	Gilboa/Galil	74
3	Hapoel Jerusalem	94
2	Maccabi Tel Aviv	108
4	Baraq Netanya	75

Final; October 14
3	Hapoel Jerusalem	77
2	Maccabi Tel Aviv	87
