= Israeli Basketball League Cup =

Sports tournament

- Current season, competition or edition: 2025 Israeli Basketball League Cup
- Sport: Basketball
- Founded: 2006
- First season: 2006
- No. of teams: 14
- Country: Israel
- Continent: Europe
- Most recent champions: Maccabi Tel Aviv (2026)
- Most titles: Maccabi Tel Aviv (12 titles)
- Related competitions: Super League; State Cup

The Israeli Basketball League Cup is a pre-season professional basketball tournament that is contested between clubs. It has been held in Israel since 2006. It is held during the week before the start of the Israeli Premier League season. The Israeli League Cup tournament is currently sponsored by Pais Lotto, and therefore it is officially known as the Chance Cup. Previously, the tournament was sponsored by the Toto Winner Organization, and it was known as the Winner Cup, from 2006 to 2009. In 2010, it had no sponsor, and therefore the tournament was named Basketball League Cup.

== Competition system ==
The top eight teams of the previous season's Israeli Premier League compete in this tournament. The tournament uses the knockout system. The teams are scheduled according to their positions in Israel's Premier League.

== Finals ==
Key
(X)	Number of times the event is held in this city or venue
MVP	Tournament Most Valuable Player award usually given to the best player on the winning team

Year	Winner(s)	Score	Runners-up	Venue	Location	MVP
2006	Ironi Ashkelon	79–73	Maccabi Rishon LeZion	Malha Arena	Jerusalem	(Israel) Guy Kantor (Note: In 2006, Kantor was named Most Valuable Player even though his team did not win the trophy but finished in second place.)
2007	Maccabi Tel Aviv	93–74	Hapoel Jerusalem	Malha Arena (2)	Jerusalem (2)	(Israel) David Blu
2008	Hapoel Jerusalem	84–69	Ironi Nahariya	Malha Arena (Note: In 2008, several games were also played at the Gan Ner Arena in Gan Ner.) (3)	Jerusalem (3)	(United States) Timmy Bowers
2009	Hapoel Jerusalem	86–80	Maccabi Tel Aviv	Malha Arena (4)	Jerusalem (4)	(United States) Tre Simmons
2010	Maccabi Tel Aviv	87–77	Hapoel Jerusalem	Malha Arena (5)	Jerusalem (5)	(United States) Jeremy Pargo
2011	Maccabi Tel Aviv	78–74	Hapoel Holon	Malha Arena (6)	Jerusalem (6)	(Israel) Lior Eliyahu
2012	Maccabi Tel Aviv	75–65	Maccabi Ashdod	Romema Arena (Note: In 2012, two quarter-finals games were played at the Kiryat Ata Hall in Kiryat Ata.)	Haifa	(United States) David Logan
2013	Maccabi Tel Aviv	88–77	Hapoel Jerusalem	Beit Maccabi (Note: In 2013, several games were played at the Nokia Arena in Tel Aviv.)	Rishon LeZion	(Israel) Sylven Landesberg
2014	Hapoel Jerusalem	81–78	Maccabi Tel Aviv	Pais Arena	Jerusalem (7)	(Israel) Yotam Halperin
2015	Maccabi Tel Aviv	87–80	Hapoel Eilat	Drive in Arena (Note: In 2015, games were also played at the Holon Toto Hall in Holon.)	Tel Aviv (2)	(United States) Devin Smith
2016	Hapoel Jerusalem	77–62	Maccabi Tel Aviv	Ein Sara Sport Hall	Nahariya	(United States) Curtis Jerrells
2017	Maccabi Tel Aviv	93–79	Ironi Nahariya	Toto Hall	Holon	(Israel) John DiBartolomeo
2018	Maccabi Rishon LeZion	78–66	Hapoel Be'er Sheva	Beit Maccabi	Rishon LeZion	(United States) Cameron Long
2019	Hapoel Jerusalem	84–83	Maccabi Tel Aviv	Toto Hall (2)	Holon (2)	(Nigeria) Suleiman Braimoh
2020	Maccabi Tel Aviv	86–84	Hapoel Holon	Drive in Arena (2)	Tel Aviv (3)	(United States) Scottie Wilbekin
2021	Maccabi Tel Aviv	92–62	Hapoel Eilat	Drive in Arena (3)	Tel Aviv (4)	(United States) James Nunnally
2022	Maccabi Tel Aviv	88–84	Hapoel Tel Aviv	Innerbox	Hadera	(United States) (Ivory Coast) Alex Poythress
2023	Hapoel Jerusalem	79–71	Maccabi Tel Aviv	Drive in Arena (4)	Tel Aviv (5)	(United States) Speedy Smith
2024	Maccabi Tel Aviv	86–83	Maccabi Ironi Ramat Gan	Toto Hall (3)	Holon (3)	(France) (United States) Jaylen Hoard
2025	Hapoel Jerusalem	89–84	Hapoel Tel Aviv	Pais Arena (2)	Jerusalem (8)	(United States) Jared Harper
2026	Maccabi Tel Aviv	86–75	Hapoel Tel Aviv	Toto Hall (4)	Holon (4)	(United States) Jimmy Clark III

== Performance by club ==
Teams shown in italics are no longer in existence.

Club	Winners	Runners-up	Years won
Maccabi Tel Aviv	12	5	2007, 2010, 2011, 2012, 2013, 2015, 2017, 2020, 2021, 2022, 2024, 2026
Hapoel Jerusalem	7	3	2008, 2009, 2014, 2016, 2019, 2023, 2025
Maccabi Rishon LeZion	1	1	2018
Ironi Ashkelon	1	–	2006
Hapoel Tel Aviv	–	3	
Ironi Nahariya	–	2	
Hapoel Eilat	–	2	
Hapoel Holon	–	2	
Maccabi Ashdod	–	1	
Hapoel Be'er Sheva	–	1	
Maccabi Ironi Ramat Gan	–	1	
