= 2011 Israeli Basketball League Cup =

Israeli basketball pre-season tournament

Tournament details
- Arena: Malha Arena; Jerusalem
- Dates: 9–13 October 2011

Final positions
- Champions: Maccabi Tel Aviv (3rd title)
- Runners-up: Hapoel Holon

Awards and statistics
- MVP: (Israel) Lior Eliyahu

The 2011 Israeli Basketball League Cup was the 6th edition of the Israeli Basketball League Cup pre-season tournament. It was played between October 9 and October 13 at Malha Arena in Jerusalem. Maccabi Tel Aviv has won the cup after beating Hapoel Holon 78-74 in the final. MVP was Lior Eliyahu (Maccabi Tel Aviv).

== Tournament Bracket ==
The teams were seeded according to their last season standings.

Quarterfinals; October 9-10
1	Maccabi Tel Aviv	117
8	Barak Netanya	66
3	Hapoel Jerusalem	75
6	Maccabi Ashdod	64
2	Gilboa/Galil	67
7	Hapoel Holon	101
4	Maccabi Rishon LeZion	78
5	Bnei HaSharon/Herzliya	75

Semifinals; October 11
1	Maccabi Tel Aviv	102
3	Hapoel Jerusalem	82
7	Hapoel Holon	84
4	Maccabi Rishon LeZion	81

Final; October 13
1	Maccabi Tel Aviv	78
7	Hapoel Holon	74
