= 2025 Israeli Basketball League Cup =

Israeli basketball pre-season tournament

Tournament details
- Country: Israel
- Dates: 9 September – 8 November 2025
- Teams: 14
- Defending champions: Maccabi Tel Aviv

Final positions
- Champions: Hapoel Jerusalem
- Runners-up: Hapoel Tel Aviv
- Semifinalists: Maccabi Tel Aviv; Hapoel HaEmek

Tournament statistics
- Matches played: 29

Awards
- MVP: (United States) Jared Harper

The 2025 Israeli Basketball League Cup, for sponsorships reasons the Winner League Cup, will be the 20th edition of the pre-season tournament of the Israeli Basketball Premier League. Fourteen Israeli Premier League team's participate. The tournament has been changed, adding a fourth group to the group stage and a play-in round. Both of the finalists from the 2024–25 Israeli Basketball Premier League, Maccabi Tel Aviv and Hapoel Jerusalem, were given a bye to the quarter-final, but the latter team chose to participate in the group stage.

== Group stage ==
=== Group A ===
| Pos | Team | Pld | W | L | GF | GA | GD | PCT | Qualification | HJE | HBS | MRL | MRG |
|---|---|---|---|---|---|---|---|---|---|---|---|---|---|
| 1 | Hapoel Jerusalem | 3 | 3 | 0 | 262 | 210 | +52 | 1.000 | Advance to Quarterfinals | | | 73–69 | 97–65 |
| 2 | Hapoel Be'er Sheva/Dimona | 3 | 1 | 2 | 249 | 246 | +3 | .333 | Advance to Quarterfinals | 76–92 | | | |
| 3 | Maccabi Rishon LeZion | 3 | 1 | 2 | 233 | 228 | +5 | .333 | Advance to Play-in | | 89–72 | | |
| 4 | Maccabi Ironi Ramat Gan | 3 | 1 | 2 | 213 | 273 | −60 | .333 | Classification play-offs | | 65–101 | 83–75 | |

=== Group B ===
| Pos | Team | Pld | W | L | GF | GA | GD | PCT | Qualification | HTA | IKA | INZ |
|---|---|---|---|---|---|---|---|---|---|---|---|---|
| 1 | Hapoel Tel Aviv | 2 | 2 | 0 | 217 | 129 | +88 | 1.000 | Advance to Quarterfinals | | | 116–63 |
| 2 | Ironi Kiryat Ata | 2 | 1 | 1 | 177 | 188 | −11 | .500 | Advance to Play-in | 101–66 | | |
| 3 | Ironi Ness Ziona | 2 | 0 | 2 | 150 | 227 | −77 | .000 | Classification play-offs | | 87–111 | |

=== Group C ===
| Pos | Team | Pld | W | L | GF | GA | GD | PCT | Qualification | HHO | ENE | HGE |
|---|---|---|---|---|---|---|---|---|---|---|---|---|
| 1 | Hapoel Holon | 2 | 2 | 0 | 173 | 162 | +11 | 1.000 | Advance to Quarterfinals | | | 91–83 |
| 2 | Elitzur Netanya | 2 | 1 | 1 | 151 | 143 | +8 | .500 | Advance to Play-in | 79–82 | | |
| 3 | Hapoel Galil Elyon | 2 | 0 | 2 | 144 | 163 | −19 | .000 | Classification play-offs | | 61–72 | |

=== Group D ===
| Pos | Team | Pld | W | L | GF | GA | GD | PCT | Qualification | HAM | BNE | MRA |
|---|---|---|---|---|---|---|---|---|---|---|---|---|
| 1 | Hapoel HaEmek | 2 | 1 | 1 | 174 | 161 | +13 | .500 | Advance to Quarterfinals | | | 89–73 |
| 2 | Bnei Herzliya | 2 | 1 | 1 | 161 | 167 | −6 | .500 | Advance to Play-in | 88–85 | | |
| 3 | Maccabi Ironi Ra'anana | 2 | 1 | 1 | 155 | 162 | −7 | .500 | Classification play-offs | | 82–73 | |

== Bracket ==
=== Main bracket ===
Play-in
20 September
Maccabi Rishon LeZion | 70
Ironi Kiryat Ata | 82
19 September
Bnei Herzliya | 88
Elitzur Netanya | 80

Quarterfinals
24 September
Maccabi Tel Aviv | 93
Ironi Kiryat Ata | 91
24 September
Hapoel Jerusalem | 105
Bnei Herzliya | 98
25 September
Hapoel Tel Aviv | 98
Hapoel Be'er Sheva/Dimona | 86
25 September
Hapoel Holon | 79
Hapoel HaEmek | 85

Semifinals
26 September
Maccabi Tel Aviv | 69
Hapoel Jerusalem | 79
27 September
Hapoel Tel Aviv | 84
Hapoel HaEmek | 65

Final
8 November
Hapoel Jerusalem | 89
Hapoel Tel Aviv | 84

=== 11–14th classification bracket ===
11–14th play-offs
25 September
Maccabi Ironi Ramat Gan | 92
Ironi Ness Ziona | 91
26 September
Hapoel Galil Elyon | 56
Maccabi Ironi Ra'anana | 85

11–12th match
29 September
Maccabi Ironi Ramat Gan | 81
Maccabi Ironi Ra'anana | 53
13–14th match
29 September
Ironi Ness Ziona | 69
Hapoel Galil Elyon | 75

== 11–14th classification play-offs ==
| 25 September | Maccabi Ironi Ramat Gan | 92–91 | Ironi Ness Ziona | Ramat Gan |
| 19:00 | Scoring by quarter: 17–26, 21–20, 30–17, 24–28 |
| | Pts: Nicholas, Ariel 16; Rebs: Nicholas 9 Asts: Alon, Segu 5 PIR: Nicholas 20 | Boxscore | Pts: Moshkovitz 26; Rebs: Amsalem 9 Asts: Weisz 7 PIR: Amsalem 26 | Arena: Zisman Sports Hall; Referees: Harel Kidron, Or Zrur, Omer Wasserman |

| 26 september | Hapoel Galil Elyon | 56–85 | Maccabi Ironi Ra'anana | Kfar Blum |
| 14:00 | Scoring by quarter: 10–20, 22–21, 10–16, 14–28 |
| | Pts: Amir 15; Rebs: Amir 8 Asts: Amir 6 PIR: Blakes 13 | Boxscore | Pts: Laszewski 20; Rebs: Laszewski 7 Asts: Diarra, Hanochi 5 PIR: Laszewski 28 | Arena: HaPais Kfar Blum; Attendance: 500; Referees: Ofer Manheim, David Kolangi, Assaf Engelberg |

=== 13–14th classification match ===
| 29 september | Ironi Ness Ziona | 69–75 | Hapoel Galil Elyon | Ness Ziona |
| 21:05 | Scoring by quarter: 23–17, 20–23, 18–17, 8–18 |
| | Pts: Rodriguez 15; Rebs: Amsalem 10; Asts: Shepherd 9 PIR: Curbelo 20 | Boxscore | Pts: Blakes 18; Rebs: Melamed 10; Asts: Blakes 4 PIR: Blakes 19 | Arena: Lev Hamoshava; Referees: Elad Leibovich, Pini Rimon, Nir Keren |

=== 11–12th classification match ===
| 29 september | Maccabi Ironi Ramat Gan | 81–53 | Maccabi Ironi Ra'anana | Ramat Gan |
| 17:45 | Scoring by quarter: 18–10, 25–21, 12–13, 26–9 |
| | Pts: Ariel 18; Rebs: Nicholas 15; Asts: Segu 6 PIR: Nicholas 27 | Boxscore | Pts: Freeman 16; Rebs: Radford 7 Asts: Radford 4 PIR: Radford 18 | Arena: Zisman Sports Hall; Referees: Nir Meirson, Rotem Kuza, David Izmirli |

== Play-in ==
| 20 September | Ironi Kiryat Ata | 82–70 | Maccabi Rishon LeZion | Hadera |
| 20:30 | Scoring by quarter: 24–25, 25–20, 13–6, 20–19 |
| | Pts: Hannah 16; Rebs: Hall 12; Asts: Neal 5 PIR: Hannah 21 | Boxscore | Pts: Ahmad 19; Rebs: Stevens 12; Asts: Williams 6 PIR: Williams 19 | Arena: Enerbox; Attendance: 300; Referees: Zahi Habdali, Guy Shmueli, Elias Abu Arab |

| 19 September | Bnei Herzliya | 88–80 | Elitzur Netanya | Hadera |
| 14:00 | Scoring by quarter: 24–18, 10–26, 32–9, 22–27 |
| | Pts: Onuaku 19; Rebs: Carter 11; Asts: Jones 7 PIR: Onuaku 25 | Boxscore | Pts: Buchanan 25; Rebs: Frazier 8 Asts: Calvin, Shabat 4 PIR: Buchanan 19 | Arena: Enerbox; Attendance: 300; Referees: Dan Yalon, Rotem Kuza, Nir Keren |

=== 9–10th classification match ===
| 28 September | Elitzur Netanya | 83–93 | Maccabi Rishon LeZion | Hadera |
| 20:50 | Scoring by quarter: 16–15, 20–32, 30–27, 17–19 |
| | Pts: Frazier 26; Rebs: Frazier 11; Asts: Buchanan, Boone 4 PIR: Boone 31 | Boxscore | Pts: Williams 19; Rebs: Freund 5 Asts: Grant 6 PIR: Williams 23 | Arena: Enerbox; Referees: Adar Pe'er, Dvir Rainisch, Said Khour |

== Quarterfinals ==
| 24 September | Maccabi Tel Aviv | 93–91 | Ironi Kiryat Ata | Tel Aviv |
| 21:00 | Scoring by quarter: 23–19, 19–23, 24–20, 27–29 |
| | Pts: Walker 24; Rebs: Sorkin 7 Asts: Blatt 6 PIR: Walker 16 | Boxscore | Pts: Hall 18; Rebs: Hall 7 Asts: Neal 11; PIR: Hall 24 | Arena: Shlomo Group Arena; Attendance: 1000; Referees: Nir Meirson, Kfir Mualem, Natali Galuk |

| 24 September | Hapoel Jerusalem | 105–98 | Bnei Herzliya | Hadera |
| 20:30 | Scoring by quarter: 24–15, 21–31, 26–32, 34–20 |
| | Pts: Harper 24; Rebs: Lamb 7 Asts: Harper 9 PIR: Harper 36 | Boxscore | Pts: Stewart 25; Rebs: Onuaku 9 Asts: Stewart 6 PIR: Stewart 32 | Arena: Enerbox; Attendance: 1,100; Referees: Omer Esteron, Ori Shalhavi, Tzur Tuval |

| 25 September | Hapoel Tel Aviv | 98–86 | Hapoel Be'er Sheva/Dimona | Tel Aviv |
| 21:00 | Scoring by quarter: 30–25, 26–24, 21–20, 21–17 |
| | Pts: Blakeney 34; Rebs: Segev 8 Asts: Micić 5 PIR: Blakeney 35 | Boxscore | Pts: Foster 18; Rebs: Angel 8 Asts: Vitlem 6 PIR: Angel 25 | Arena: Shlomo Group Arena; Attendance: 2,200; Referees: Dan Yalon, Rotem Kuza, Pini Rimon |

| 25 September | Hapoel Holon | 79–85(OT) | Hapoel HaEmek | Hadera |
| 18:40 | Scoring by quarter: 12–18, 20–18, 23–19, 18–18, Overtime: 6–12 |
| | Pts: McRae 28; Rebs: Brooks 8 Asts: Kravitz 4 PIR: McRae 32 | Boxscore | Pts: Misgav 23; Rebs: Wheeler 8 Asts: Goldenberg 7 PIR: Shedrick 23 | Arena: Enerbox; Attendance: 1,000; Referees: Sefi Shemesh, Elad Leibovich, Elias Abu Arab |

== Semifinals ==
| 26 September | Maccabi Tel Aviv | 69–79 | Hapoel Jerusalem | Holon |
| 14:45 | Scoring by quarter: 19–23, 12–18, 17–18, 21–20 |
| | Pts: Clark 16; Rebs: Sorkin 7 Asts: Three Players 2 PIR: Sorkin 13 | Boxscore | Pts: Harper 22; Rebs: Three Players 7 Asts: Harper 6 PIR: Harper 26 | Arena: Holon Toto Hall; Attendance: 4,689; Referees: Ofer Manheim, Zahi Habdali, Dvir Rainisch |

| 27 September | Hapoel Tel Aviv | 84–65 | Hapoel HaEmek | Holon |
| 20:10 | Scoring by quarter: 22–26, 28–15, 14–9, 20–15 |
| | Pts: Oturu 20; Rebs: Oturu 8 Asts: Bryant 9 PIR: Oturu 30 | Boxscore | Pts: Henry 17; Rebs: Childs 8 Asts: Henry 4 PIR: Goldenberg 15 | Arena: Holon Toto Hall; Attendance: 800; Referees: Sefi Shemesh, Adar Pe'er, Said Khoury |

== Final ==
| 8 November | Hapoel Jerusalem | 89–84 | Hapoel Tel Aviv | Jerusalem |
| 19:10 | Scoring by quarter: 29–24, 23–26, 24–14, 13–20 |
| | Pts: Harper 33; Rebs: Wiley 8 Asts: Harper 5 PIR: Harper 37 | Boxscore | Pts: Blakeney 19; Rebs: Wainright 7 Asts: Micić 6 PIR: Bryant 17 | Arena: Pais Arena; Attendance: 8,921; Referees: Sefi Shemesh, Adar Pe'er, Rotem Kuza |

| Starters: | | | Pts | Reb | Ast |
|---|---|---|---|---|---|
| PG | 1 | (United States) Jared Harper | 33 | 3 | 5 |
| SG | 3 | (Trinidad and Tobago) Khadeen Carrington | 15 | 1 | 2 |
| G/F | 50 | (Israel) Yovel Zoosman | 10 | 2 | 1 |
| C | 5 | (United States) Austin Wiley | 4 | 8 | 0 |
| F | 22 | (United States) Anthony Lamb | 2 | 4 | 0 |
| Reserves: | | | | | |
| PG | 13 | (Israel) Roi Huber | 12 | 1 | 4 |
| SF | 91 | (United States) Josiah-Jordan James | 8 | 4 | 2 |
| SG | 6 | (Israel) Roy Paretsky | 3 | 2 | 0 |
| F/C | 0 | (United States) Justin Smith | 2 | 2 | 1 |
Head coach:
(Israeli Basketball Association) Yonatan Alon

| H. Jerusalem | H. Tel Aviv |

| H. Jerusalem | Statistics | H. Tel Aviv |
|---|---|---|
| 18/25 (72%) | 2 point field goals | 20/40 (50%) |
| 11/31 (35%) | 3 point field goals | 7/33 (21%) |
| 20/24 (83%) | Free throws | 23/25 (92%) |
| 36 | Rebounds | 35 |
| 15 | Assists | 12 |
| 3 | Steals | 5 |
| 13 | Turnovers | 5 |
| 2 | Blocks | 1 |

| Starters: | | | Pts | Reb | Ast |
|---|---|---|---|---|---|
| G/F | 3 | (United States) Elijah Bryant | 18 | 5 | 4 |
| PG | 22 | (Serbia) Vasilije Micić | 14 | 2 | 6 |
| F | 24 | (United States) Ish Wainright | 9 | 7 | 0 |
| SG | 9 | (Israel) Guy Palatin | 7 | 3 | 0 |
| C | 25 | (United States) Daniel Oturu | 6 | 5 | 1 |
| Reserves: | | | | | |
| SG | 2 | (United States) Antonio Blakeney | 19 | 2 | 0 |
| F | 14 | (Israel) Oz Blayzer | 5 | 4 | 1 |
| F/C | 6 | (Israel) Itay Segev | 4 | 4 | 0 |
| G | 10 | (Israel) Bar Timor | 2 | 1 | 0 |
Head coach:
(Hellenic Basketball Federation) Dimitris Itoudis

2025 League Cup Winners
Hapoel Jerusalem
7^{th} title

== Final rankings ==
| R | Team |
|---|---|
| 1st place, gold medalist(s) | Hapoel Jerusalem |
| 2nd place, silver medalist(s) | Hapoel Tel Aviv |
| 3–4 | Maccabi Tel Aviv |
| 3–4 | Hapoel HaEmek |
| 5–8 | Ironi Kiryat Ata |
| 5–8 | Hapoel Holon |
| 5–8 | Bnei Herzliya |
| 5–8 | Hapoel Be'er Sheva/Dimona |
| 9 | Maccabi Rishon LeZion |
| 10 | Elitzur Netanya |
| 11 | Maccabi Ironi Ramat Gan |
| 12 | Maccabi Ironi Ra'anana |
| 13 | Hapoel Galil Elyon |
| 14 | Ironi Ness Ziona |
