= Hapoel Lod =

Hapoel Lod may refer to:

- Hapoel Lod B.C., a basketball team representing Lod, Israel
- Hapoel Lod F.C., an Israeli football club based in Lod
