= 2009 Israeli Basketball League Cup =

Israeli basketball pre-season tournament

Tournament details
- Arena: Malha Arena; Jerusalem
- Dates: 4–8 October 2009

Final positions
- Champions: Hapoel Jerusalem (2nd title)
- Runners-up: Maccabi Tel Aviv

Awards and statistics
- MVP: (United States) Tre Simmons

Winner Cup 2009 was the 4th edition of the Israeli basketball pre-season tournament Winner Cup. It was played between October 4 and October 8 in Jerusalem at the Malha Arena, during the Jewish holiday of Sukkot. Hapoel Jerusalem has won the cup after defeating Maccabi Tel Aviv 86-80 in the final. MVP was Tre Simmons (Hapoel Jerusalem).

== Tournament Bracket ==
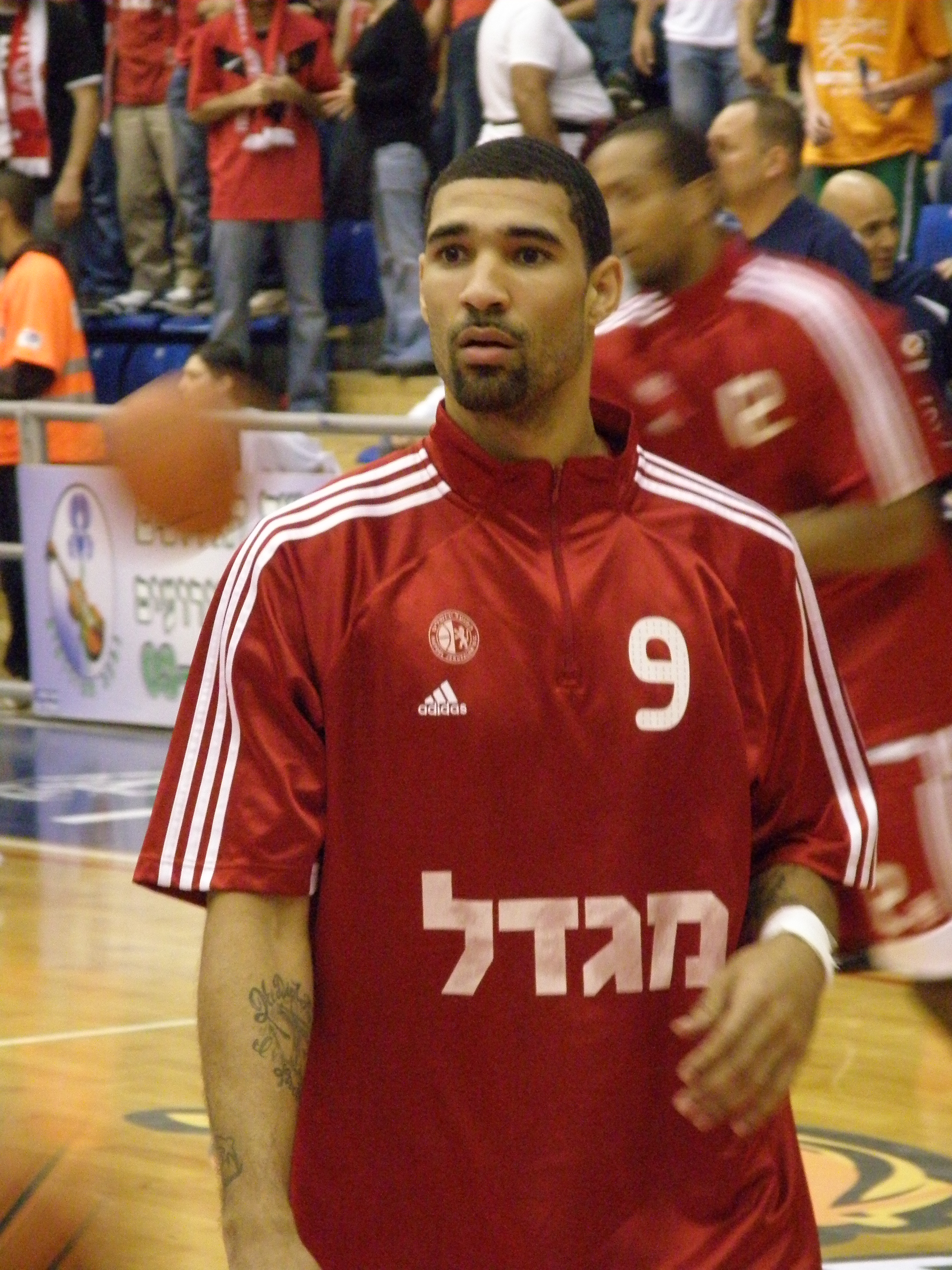
Tre Simmons

The teams were seeded according to their last season standings.

Quarter-finals
1	Maccabi Tel Aviv	101
8	Ironi Ashkelon	80
3	Gilboa/Galil	77
6	Bnei HaSharon	62
4	Hapoel Jerusalem	96
5	Hapoel Holon	81
2	Maccabi Haifa	77
7	Ironi Nahariya	73

Semi-finals
1	Maccabi Tel Aviv	87
3	Gilboa/Galil	65
2	Maccabi Haifa	75
4	Hapoel Jerusalem	77

Final
1	Maccabi Tel Aviv	80
4	Hapoel Jerusalem	86
Third place
3	Gilboa/Galil	79
2	Maccabi Haifa	81
