= Trent Lockett =

American basketball player (born 1990)

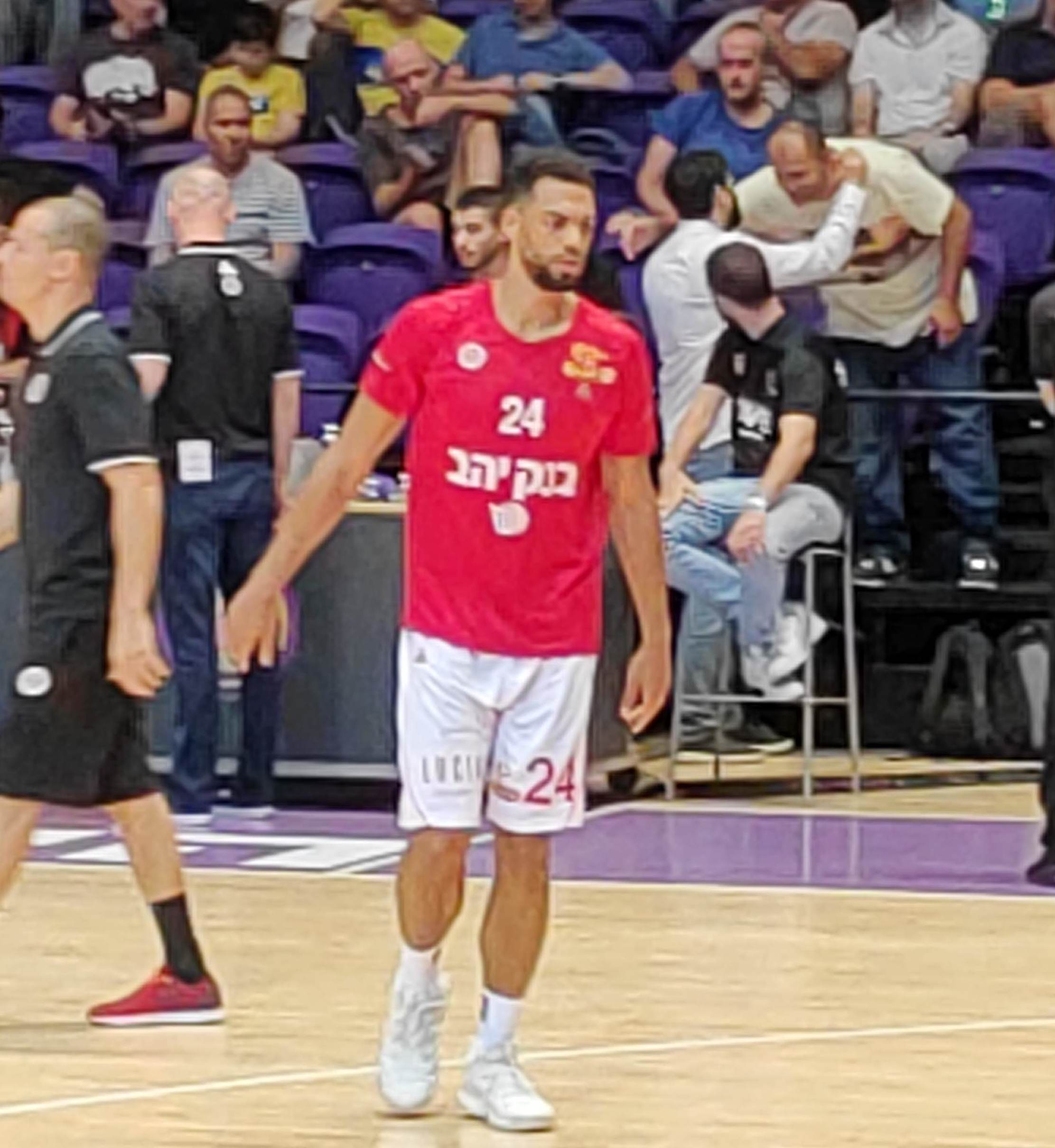
- Lockett with Hapoel Jerusalem in 2019

Personal information
- Born: December 10, 1990 (age 35) Golden Valley, Minnesota, U.S.
- Listed height: 1.96 m (6 ft 5 in)
- Listed weight: 95 kg (209 lb)

Career information
- High school: Hopkins (Minnetonka, Minnesota)
- College: Arizona State (2009–2012); Marquette (2012–2013)
- NBA draft: 2013: undrafted
- Playing career: 2013–2023
- Position: Shooting guard / small forward

Career history
- 2013–2014: Reno Bighorns
- 2014–2015: Braunschweig
- 2015–2016: Aquila Trento
- 2016–2017: Real Betis
- 2017–2019: UNICS
- 2019–2020: Hapoel Jerusalem
- 2021: Universo Treviso
- 2021–2022: Niners Chemnitz
- 2022–2023: Dolomiti Energia Trento

Career highlights
- Israeli State Cup winner (2020); Israeli League Cup winner (2019); Second-team All-Pac-10 (2011); Pac-10 All-Freshman team (2010)
- Stats at Basketball Reference

Trenton Merrick Lockett (born December 10, 1990) is an American professional basketball player who last played for Dolomiti Energia Trento of the Italian Lega Basket Serie A (LBA). He played college basketball for Arizona State and Marquette before playing professionally in the NBA G League, Germany, Italy, Spain, Russia and Israel.

== High school career ==
Lockett attended Hopkins High School in Minnetonka, Minnesota. As a senior, he helped guide Hopkins to a 31–0 season and the 4A state championship with averages of 15 points and eight rebounds per game.

== College career ==
In his freshman season at Arizona State, Lockett was named to the Pac-10 All-Freshman team. In 33 games (15 starts), he averaged 6.7 points and 3.4 rebounds in 19.6 minutes per game.

In his sophomore season, he earned second-team All-Pac-10 honors and first-team Pac-10 All-Academic honors. In 29 games, he averaged 13.4 points, 5.3 rebounds and 2.5 assists in 30.7 minutes per game.

In his junior season, he was a Capital One Academic All-District 8 honoree and was named first team all-academic by the league as well. In 25 games, he led the team in scoring (13.0) and rebounding (5.8), and added 2.2 assists and 1.5 steals in 34.9 minutes per game.

That season, Lockett learned his mother had cancer, and looked into playing closer to his home in Minnesota. He graduated after the season, allowing him to use his remaining year of eligibility at another school without needing to sit out a season for transferring.

In 2012, Lockett transferred to Marquette for his senior year to be closer to his mother, who was suffering from lymphoma. He was named to the 2012–13 Big East All-Academic Team and was also named Marquette's Defensive Player of the Year at the season's end. In 35 games, he averaged 7.0 points, 5.1 rebounds, 1.8 assists in 26.6 minutes per game.

== Professional career ==
=== Reno Bighorns (2013–2014) ===
After going undrafted in the 2013 NBA draft, Lockett joined the Sacramento Kings for the 2013 NBA Summer League. On August 28, 2013, he signed with the Kings. However, he was later waived by the Kings on October 24, 2013. In November 2013, Lockett was acquired by the Reno Bighorns as an affiliate player. In 46 games played for the Bighorns, he averaged 11 points, 5.5 rebounds and 2 assists per game, while shooting 42.3 percent from three-point range.

=== Braunschweig (2014–2015) ===
In July 2014, Lockett joined the NBA D-League Select Team for the 2014 NBA Summer League. On August 8, 2014, he signed with Basketball Löwen Braunschweig of the Basketball Bundesliga. In 30 games played for Braunschweig, he averaged 12.5 points, 5.0 rebounds, 2.4 assists and 1.3 steals per game.

=== Trento (2015–2016) ===
In July 2015, Lockett joined the Indiana Pacers for the 2015 NBA Summer League. On August 5, 2015, he signed a one-year deal with Dolomiti Energia Trento of the Italian Serie A. In 32 games played for Trento, he averaged 10.2 points, 3.3 rebounds and 1.5 assists per game. Lockett helped the team reach the EuroCup Semifinals, where they fell short to SIG Strasbourg.

=== Real Betis (2016–2017) ===
On August 9, 2016, Lockett signed a one-year deal, with an option for another one, with Spanish club Real Betis Energía Plus. On December 11, 2016, Lockett recorded a career-high 27 points, shooting 9-of-16 from the field, along with seven rebounds and four steals in a 94–88 win over Joventut Badalona. In 31 games played for Betis, he averaged 11.2 points, 5.3 rebounds and 1.4 assists per game, while shooting 39.3 percent from three-point range.

=== UNICS Kazan (2017–2019) ===
In July 2017, Lockett joined the Atlanta Hawks for the 2017 NBA Summer League. On July 10, 2017, Lockett joined UNICS of the VTB United League and the EuroCup, signing a one-year deal with an option for another one. In his second season with Kazan, he helped the team reach the EuroCup Semifinals, where they eventually were eliminated by Valencia.

=== Hapoel Jerusalem (2019–2020) ===
On August 7, 2019, Lockett signed a one-year deal with Hapoel Jerusalem of the Israeli Premier League.

=== Universo Treviso Basket (2021) ===
On January 29, 2021, he has signed with Universo Treviso of the Lega Basket Serie A (LBA).

=== Niners Chemnitz (2021–2022) ===
On December 9, 2021, Lockett signed with Niners Chemnitz of the Basketball Bundesliga.

=== Aquila Basket Trento (2022–2023) ===
On July 30, 2022, he has signed with Dolomiti Energia Trento of the Italian Lega Basket Serie A (LBA).

== Personal life ==
Lockett is the son of Ted and Judy Lockett. His father died when he was three. His sister, Taylor, played college volleyball for Duquesne University and Southern Methodist University.
