= 2012 Israeli Basketball League Cup =

Israeli basketball pre-season tournament

Tournament details
- Arena: Romema Arena / Kiryat Ata Hall; Haifa / Kiryat Ata
- Dates: 2–6 October 2012

Final positions
- Champions: Maccabi Tel Aviv (4th title)
- Runners-up: Maccabi Ashdod

Awards and statistics
- MVP: (United States) David Logan

The 2012 Israeli Basketball League Cup was the 7th edition of the Israeli Basketball League Cup pre-season tournament. It plays between October 2 and October 6 mainly at Romema Arena in Haifa, as Kiryat Ata Hall hosted two quarterfinals games.

== Teams Participating ==
As the format states, the top eight teams on the 2011–12 Israeli Super League should have competed in the tournament. However, two changes were made. One was caused by the owner of Habik'a, who finished in 8th place, moving his license To Eilat to form Hapoel Eilat. The second change was made as the hosts Maccabi Haifa replaced Ironi Ashkelon who finished at the 6th place last season.

== Tournament Bracket ==
Quarterfinals; October 2
1	Maccabi Tel Aviv	86
8	Hapoel Eilat	63
3	Maccabi Rishon LeZion	57
6	Maccabi Haifa	71
2	Gilboa/Galil	66
7	Maccabi Ashdod	71
4	Hapoel Jerusalem	93
5	Hapoel Holon	69

Semifinals; October 4
1	Maccabi Tel Aviv	86
6	Maccabi Haifa	79
7	Maccabi Ashdod	69
4	Hapoel Jerusalem	59

Final; October 6
1	Maccabi Tel Aviv	75
7	Maccabi Ashdod	65
