= Hapoel Be'er Sheva B.C. =

Hapoel Be'er Sheva
- Leagues: Israeli Basketball Premier League
- Founded: 1965; 61 years ago
- Arena: Conch Arena (Sea shell)
- Capacity: 3,000
- Location: Be'er Sheva, Israel
- Team colors: Red, White
- CEO: Tomer Yaron
- President: Kfir Arazi
- Head coach: Doug Spradley
- Championships: 0
- Website: hb7.co.il
Home	Away

Hapoel Be'er Sheva B.C. (Hebrew: הפועל באר שבע) is a professional basketball club based in Be'er Sheva, Israel. The team plays in the Israeli Basketball Premier League, the top tier of Israeli basketball and in the Balkan International Basketball League. It plays its home games in the Conch Arena.

For the 2026–27 season, Hapoel Be'er Sheva appointed veteran American-German Doug Spradley as the team's new head coach. Spradley arrived in Be'er Sheva following an extensive coaching career in European basketball, including a successful four-year spell with ZZ Leiden in the Netherlands.

As part of the roster rebuild ahead of the new campaign, the club added Israeli players Golan Gutt, Noam Avivi and Ido Flaisher. Gutt, an experienced Israeli shooting guard, joined Be'er Sheva after playing for several clubs in Israel. His signing added another experienced Israeli player to the team's backcourt and wing rotation. Avivi, a 2.05-meter Israeli forward, joined the club as another addition to its frontcourt. Flaisher, a 2.08-meter Israeli center, returned to Be'er Sheva for a second stint, after previously playing for the team during the 2024–25 season. He spent the following season with Ironi Ashkelon before returning to Be'er Sheva.

== History ==
=== 20th century ===
The club was founded in 1965 by Eitan Wegmann. During the eighties, the team won the Second League twice. During the nineties, the team disbanded.

=== 2000s ===
In 2002 the basketball club Hapoel Be'er Sheva rebranded, and started the season in the Fifth League. Within three years it qualified for the Second League.

During the 2006/07 season, the team stood one game away from ascending to the Israeli Basketball Premier League, but lost the final game of a 5-game series in the Liga Leumit (Second League) finals to Hapoel Holon. This series has been recalled as one of the hardest-fought series in the history of the Second League. A season later Be'er Sheva was eliminated in the quarter-finals of the Second League playoffs.

In order to continue to maintain the club's youth department, called "Future of the Negev", then-chairman Mario Levy and his son Rami (then director) once again rebranded the team in the summer of 2008, and assumed management of the club's youth department starting from the 2008/2009 season. The new team began to play in the Fifth League, and at the end of the season the team progressed to the Fourth League. A season later, the team fought relegation, and in the last cycle of the league remained in the league.

=== 2010s ===
At the beginning of the 2011/2012 season, the men's team was united with Beitar Be'er Sheva under the title of Municipal Be'er Sheva. The united team competed in Liga Artzit (the Third League). The leadership of the club was assumed by local businessman owner and chairman Kfir Arazi, who joined during the summer. The team was re-branded under his ownership, and competed again in the local Fourth League.

In the summer of 2013 Hapoel Be'er Sheva and Beitar/Municipal Be'er Sheva understood merged under the name Hapoel Be'er Sheva. Hapoel Be'er Sheva finished the 2013/2014 season in first place in the Fourth League, and at the end of the season returned to the Artzit (3rd) League.

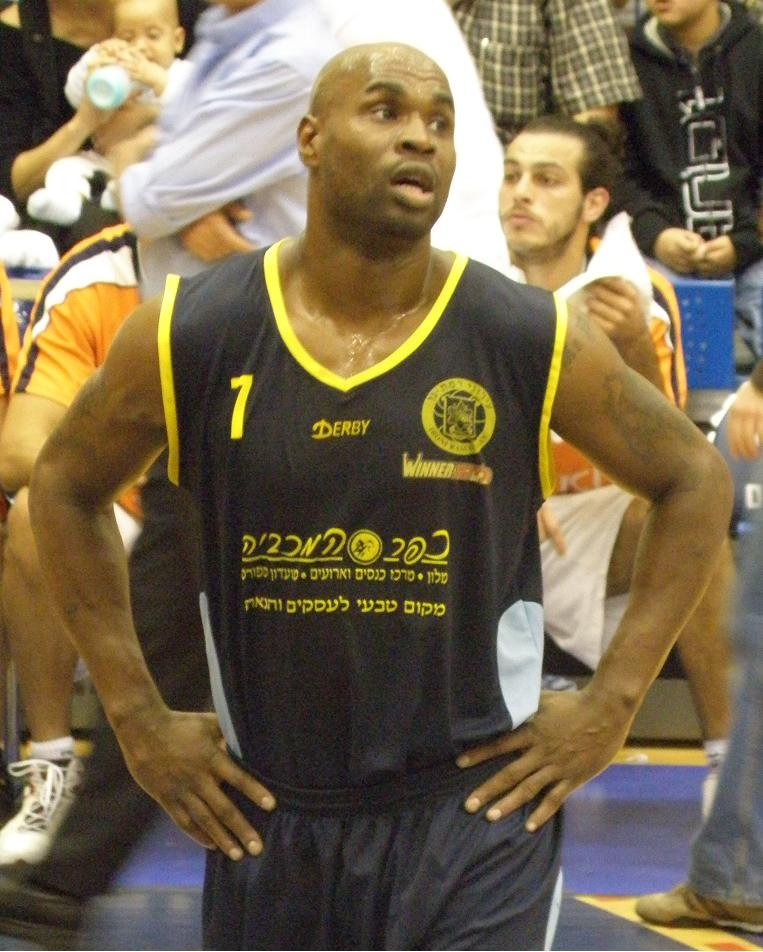
Chris Watson

In the summer of 2014 the club signed sponsorship deals with two major entities, the Bnei Shimon Regional Council and the Altshuler Shaham investment house, thus assuring the financial longevity of the club. Kfir Arazi owned and steered the club. American–Israeli Chris Watson played for the team in 2014–16. On 29 March 2015 Be'er Sheva ensured its rise to the Liga Leumit with a home victory over Hapoel Lod, 56:82.

The 2015–2016 season began well with Beer Sheva consistently at the top of the league, aiming squarely at the Premier League. However, after a series of critical injuries and some locker-room trouble the team lost its bid in the first round of the playoffs, and remained in the Liga Leumit (2nd League).

The 2016–2017 season began with a new coaching team, Yaniv Burger and Zach Schneider, and an almost new team which included Jeff Allen, Jason Williams, David Shamriz, and Ben Eisenhardt.

On 22 May 2018, Hapoel Be'er Sheva won the National League title and earned promotion to the Israeli Basketball Premier League for the first time in their history, as they swept Maccabi Kiryat Gat 3–0 in the best-of-five series. Storm Warren was named Finals MVP.

=== 2020s ===
In the 2022–23 BIBL season, Hapoel Be'er Sheva won the Balkan International Basketball League (BIBL) with a 13-1 record in the regular season, and by defeating KB Peja in the final, 99–95.

== Arena ==
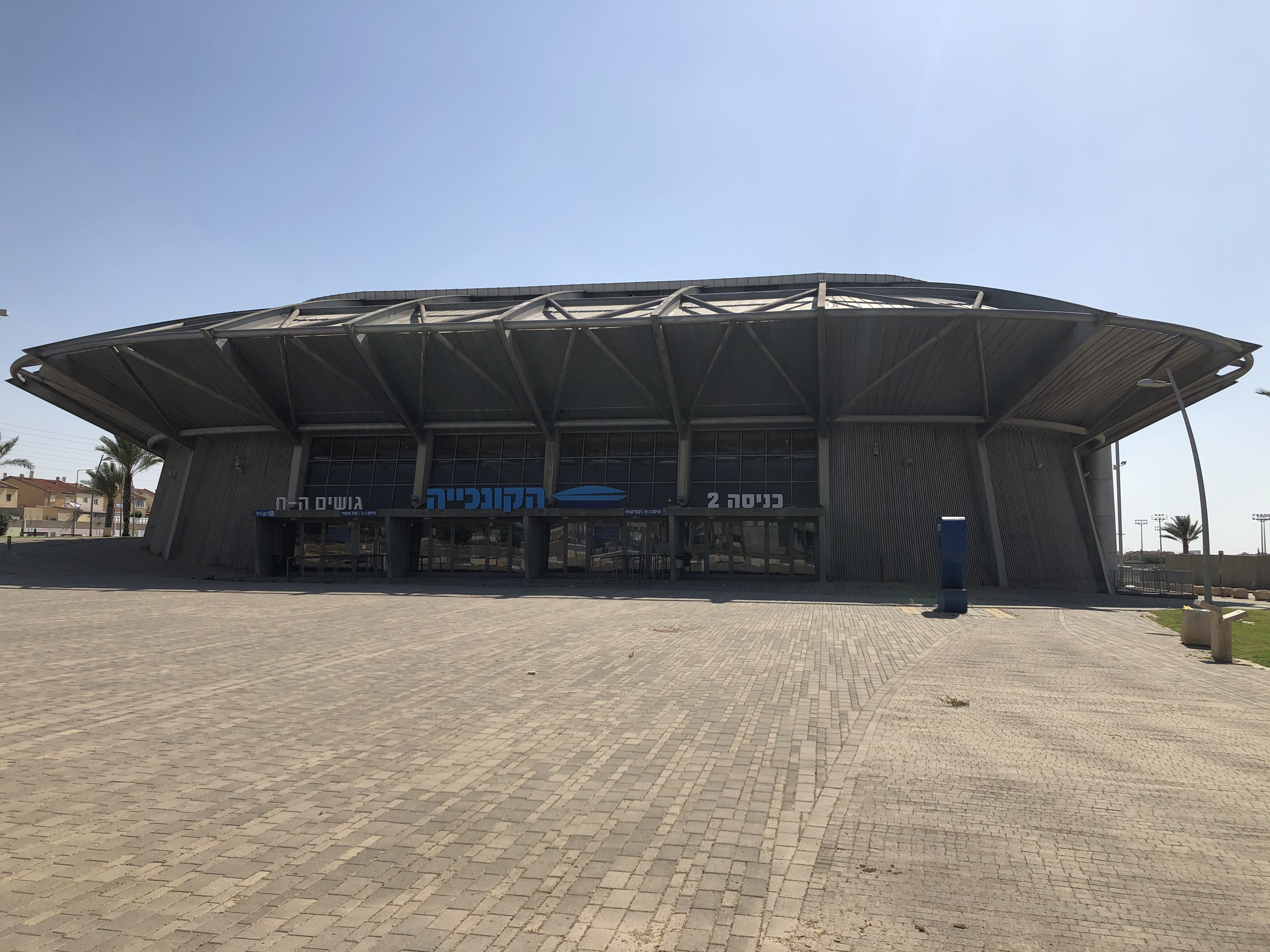
Conch Arena, home stadium of Hapoel Be'er Sheva.

Conch Arena is a multi-purpose sports arena located in Be'er Sheva, and has 3,000 seats.

On 25 February 2014 the arena was inaugurated, by Rubik Danilovich, the mayor of Be'er Sheva, Shmuel Frenkel, chairman of BSL, and Itzik Larry, Chairman of Wiener, before the Premier League All-Star Game.

== Season by season ==
Season	Tier	League	Pos	State Cup	League Cup	European Competitions	
2014–15	3	Liga Artzit	1st				
2015–16	2	National League	5th	Round of 32			
2016–17	2	National League	2nd	Quarterfinalist			
2017–18	2	National League	1st	Quarterfinalist			
2018–19	1	Premier League	7th	Quarterfinalist	Runner-up		
2019–20	1	Premier League	9th	Round of 16	Quarterfinalist		
2020–21	1	Premier League	QF	Round of 16	First round	Balkan League	RS
2021–22	1	Premier League	11th	—	First round		
2022–23	1	Premier League	QF	Quarterfinalist	First round	Balkan League	C
2023–24	1	Premier League	12th	Semifinalist	Quarterfinalist	European North League	Withdrew
2024–25	1	Premier League	PI	Quarterfinalist	Quarterfinalist		

== Current roster ==
Hapoel Be'er Sheva roster
Players
Coaches

Pos.	No.	Nat.	Name	Ht.	Age
G	0	(United States)	Cabbil, Lovell	1.90 m (6 ft 3 in)	29 – 13 January 1997
F	1	(United States)	Coleman, Christian	2.03 m (6 ft 8 in)	26 – 28 August 2000
G	2	(United States)	Cameron, Brian	1.88 m (6 ft 2 in)	29 – 19 May 1997
F	5	(Israel)	Shitrit, Ofri	1.99 m (6 ft 6 in)	21 – 3 July 2005
PG	6	(Israel)	Khanterovich, Ido	1.85 m (6 ft 1 in)	19 – 17 April 2007
SG	7	(Israel)	Gutt, Golan	1.95 m (6 ft 5 in)	31 – 7 November 1994
F/C	8	(Poland) (Israel)	Flaisher, Ido	2.08 m (6 ft 10 in)	28 – 27 January 1998
G	10	(United States)	Bailey, Amari (injured)	1.95 m (6 ft 5 in)	22 – 17 February 2004
C	11	(United States) (Israel)	Wiznitzer, Gabe	2.11 m (6 ft 11 in)	25 – 9 October 2001
F	12	(United States)	Smith, Tyreek	2.04 m (6 ft 8 in)	26 – 21 January 2000
G	22	(Israel)	Hoter, Nate	1.87 m (6 ft 2 in)	22 – 20 February 2004
G/F	23	(United States)	Walker, M. J.	1.96 m (6 ft 5 in)	28 – 28 March 1998
G	25	(Israel)	Doron, Shachar	1.98 m (6 ft 6 in)	21 – 22 May 2005
SF	35	(Israel)	Fogel, Matan	1.97 m (6 ft 6 in)	19 – 3 October 2007
PF	55	(Israel)	Avivi, Noam	2.05 m (6 ft 9 in)	27 – 25 February 1999

Head coach

- (United States) Doug Spradley

Assistant coach(es)

- (Israel) Yaniv Ravins
- (Spain) Javier Cal Muniz

Legend

- (C) Team captain
- Injured

- Roster
Updated: 1 October 2026

=== Depth chart ===
Pos.	Starting 5	Bench 1	Bench 2
C	Ido Flaisher	Gabe Wiznitzer	Ofri Shitrit
PF	Tyreek Smith	Noam Avivi	Matan Fogel
SF	M. J. Walker	Christian Coleman	Shachar Doron
SG	Golan Gutt	Amari Bailey	Nate Hoter
PG	Lovell Cabbil	Brian Cameron	Ido Khanterovich

- The Israeli league rule requires every team to have at least one Israeli on the court at any time.
- There should be at least 7 Israelis and up to 5 foreigners on a 12-men game sheet.

Source: basket.co.il

=== Notable players ===
Note: Flags indicate national team eligibility at FIBA-sanctioned events. Players may hold other non-FIBA nationalities not displayed.

Criteria

To appear in this section a player must have either:

- Set a club record or won an individual award while at the club
- Played at least one official international match for their national team at any time
- Played at least one official NBA match at any time.

- (Israel) Ohad Cohen 6 seasons: '06–'08, '14–'18
- (United States) (Israel) Chris Watson 2 seasons: '14–'16
- (United States) Keith Clanton 1 season: '15–'16
- (Israel) Anton Shoutvin 1 season: '15–'16
- (United States) Jason Williams 1 season: '16–'17
- (United States) Jeff Allen 1 season: '16–'17
- (United States) (Israel) Anthony Fisher 2 seasons: '16–'18
- (United States) Andell Cumberbatch 1 season: '17–'18
- (United States) Storm Warren 1 season: '17–'18
- (Israel) Amit Gershon 2 seasons: '17–'19
- (United States) Semaj Christon 1 season: '18–'19
- (United States) Taylor Braun 1 season: '18–'19
- (United States) Jordan Swing 1 season: '18–'19
- (United States) Jakim Donaldson 1 season: '18–'19
- (United States) Kerron Johnson 1 season: '18–'19
- (Denmark) (Israel) Chanan Colman 1 season: '18–'19
