= John Allen (basketball) =

American basketball player

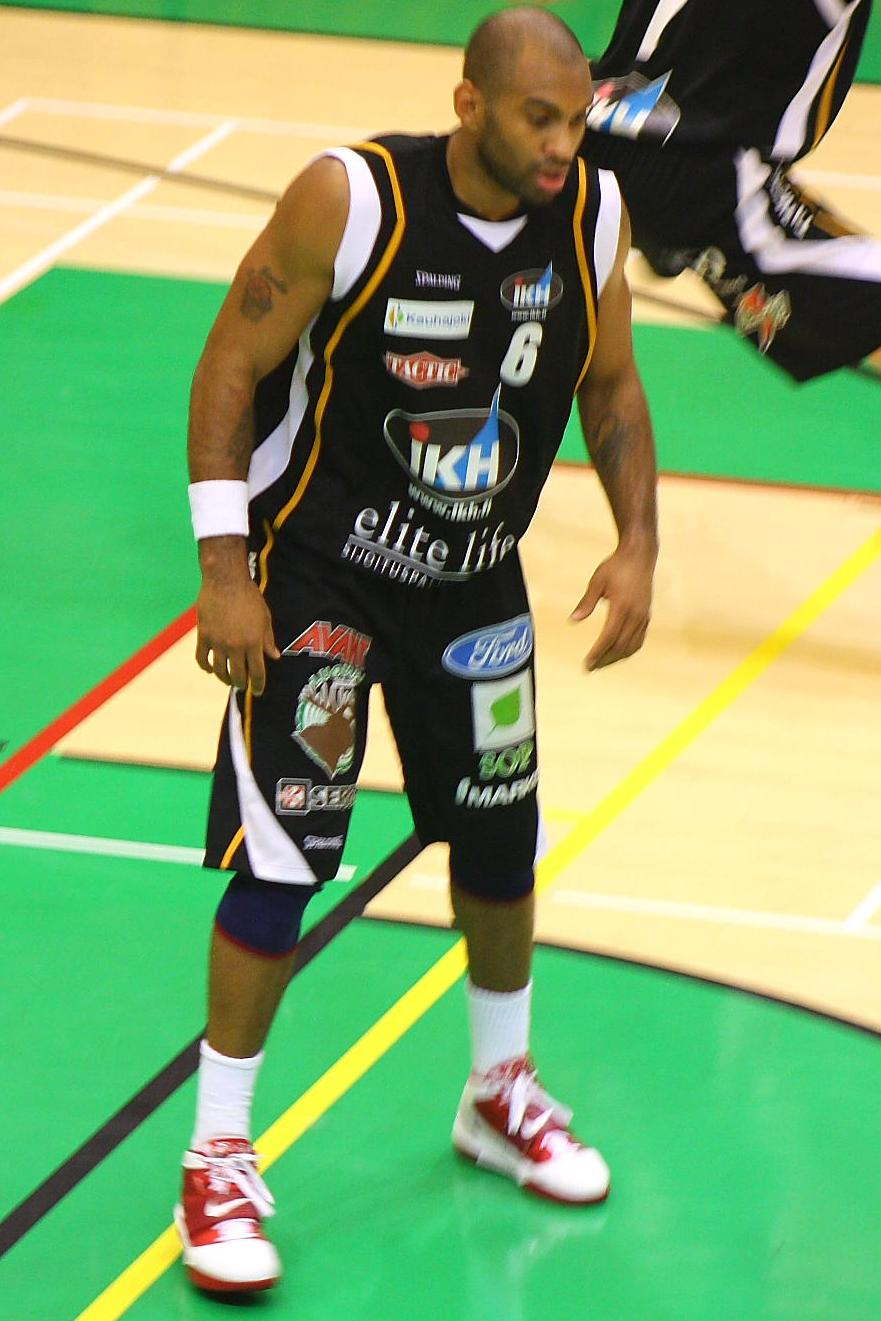

Personal information
- Born: November 1, 1982 (age 44) Coatesville, Pennsylvania
- Listed height: 6 ft 5 in (1.96 m)
- Listed weight: 200 lb (91 kg)

Career information
- High school: Coatesville (Coatesville, Pennsylvania)
- College: Seton Hall (2001–2005)
- NBA draft: 2005: undrafted
- Playing career: 2005–2012
- Position: Small forward / shooting guard

Career history
- 2005: New Jersey Flyers
- 2005–2006: Kouvot
- 2006–2007: Ironi Ramat Gan
- 2007–2008: Phantoms Braunschweig
- 2008–2009: Strasbourg IG
- 2009–2010: Phantoms Braunschweig
- 2010: Kauhajoen Karhu
- 2011: Eisbären Bremerhaven
- 2011–2012: Anwil Włocławek
- 2012: Reales de La Vega

Career highlights
- Second-team Parade All-American (2001)

John Allen (born November 1, 1982) is an American professional basketball player.

== College career ==
Allen hails from Coatesville, Pennsylvania, and played college basketball at Seton Hall University from 2001 to 2005. Allen is currently 15th all time in Seton Hall scoring (1,466), while averaging 12.3 points per game. Allen is also 4th all time in minutes played (3,821) and 6th all time in career starts (111) at Seton Hall University.

== Awards ==
- 2000 & 2001 All-State Pennsylvania
- 2001 Parade Magazine 2nd Team All-American
- 2001 McDonald's All-American Honorable Mention
- 2001 USA Today 3rd Team All USA
- 2001 SLAM Magazine All-American Honorable Mention
- 2001 EA Sports Roundball Classic (leading scorer)
- 2002 All Big East Rookie Team
- 2003 Metropolitan 2nd Team
- 2005 USBL Rookie of the Year

== Achievements ==
- Coatesville (PA) High School's All Time Leading Scorer (2,372)surpassing Detroit Pistons great Richard Hamilton (basketball).
- Averaged 26 points per game as senior, leading Coatesville to State Class AAAA Title.
- Scored 29 points for East in 2001 EA Sports Roundball Classic All-American Game.
