= Jaylen Hoard =

French-American basketball player (born 1999)

- Hoard with Maccabi Tel Aviv in 2026

No. 1 – Maccabi Tel Aviv
- Position: Power forward / small forward
- League: Israeli Premier League; EuroLeague

Personal information
- Born: March 30, 1999 (age 27) Le Havre, France
- Listed height: 2.05 m (6 ft 9 in)
- Listed weight: 216 lb (98 kg)

Career information
- High school: Wesleyan Christian Academy (High Point, North Carolina)
- College: Wake Forest (2018–2019)
- NBA draft: 2019: undrafted
- Playing career: 2019–present

Career history
- 2019–2020: Portland Trail Blazers
- 2019–2020: →Texas Legends
- 2021–2022: Oklahoma City Blue
- 2021–2022: Oklahoma City Thunder
- 2022–2024: Hapoel Tel Aviv
- 2024–present: Maccabi Tel Aviv

Career highlights
- Israeli Premier League champion (2026); All-Israeli League Second Team (2024); Israeli Cup winner (2025); Israeli League Cup winner (2024); Israeli League Cup MVP (2024); Nike Hoop Summit (2018)
- Stats at NBA.com
- Stats at Basketball Reference

Jaylen Hoard (born March 30, 1999) is a French-American professional basketball player for Maccabi Tel Aviv of the Israeli Premier League and the EuroLeague. He played college basketball for the Wake Forest Demon Deacons. Born in Le Havre, France, he began his career at INSEP in Paris, competing with the amateur club Centre Fédéral de Basket-ball of the Nationale Masculine 1 (NM1). He became among of the most sought-after prospects of the class of 2018, and a consensus five-star recruit, after moving to Wesleyan Christian Academy in High Point, North Carolina.

== Early life ==
Hoard was born in Le Havre, France to an American father and French mother, both with basketball experience. His father Antwon Hoard played for Murray State in college and spent multiple seasons in France in the LNB Pro A. His mother Katia Foucade played for the University of Washington and was a member of the French national team. Hoard's younger sister Anaia, one of four siblings, has played with the French national under-17 team.

== Youth career ==
In 2015, Hoard signed a two-year contract with the French athlete institute INSEP in Paris, joining affiliated club Centre Fédéral de Basket-ball (CFBB). With CFBB, Hoard competed in the Nationale Masculine 1, the third-tier division in France, for the 2015–16 season. In April 2015, he was named most valuable player (MVP) of the Jordan Brand Classic International Game, recording 16 points, 7 rebounds, and 5 steals. On April 16, 2016, Hoard recorded a season-high 23 points, shooting 9-of-15 from the field, in a win over Caen Basket Calvados. He finished the NM1 season averaging 8.0 points, 3.5 rebounds, 1.6 assists, and 1.1 steals per game.

== High school career ==
In the summer of 2016, Hoard arrived in the United States to begin playing basketball for Wesleyan Christian Academy in High Point, North Carolina. He was encouraged to join the program because his father had become friends with its head coach Keith Gatlin during his playing career. After making the move, Hoard said, "I just felt like it was time to come over here and compete against the best. A lot of people know me for basketball in France, but I want to make it over here. This is where all the talent is so I want to prove myself." Entering the season, Wesleyan was ranked among the top-10 in the nation by MaxPreps, and in the top-20 by USA Today High School Sports. In the beginning of the season, he spent time adjusting to the American style of basketball.

Hoard was rated as a five-star recruit and considered one of the best players of the 2018 class. He was ranked 22nd in the class of 2018 by ESPN.

College recruiting
Name	Hometown	School	Height	Weight	Commit date
Jaylen Hoard; SF	Carnon, FR	Wesleyan Christian Academy (NC)	6 ft 8 in (2.03 m)	195 lb (88 kg)	Aug 26, 2017
Jaylen Hoard; SF	Recruit ratings: Rivals: 247Sports: ESPN: (91)				
Overall recruit ranking: Rivals: 27 247Sports: 17 ESPN: 22
Note: In many cases, Scout, Rivals, 247Sports, On3, and ESPN may conflict in their listings of height and weight.; In these cases, the average was taken. ESPN grades are on a 100-point scale.; Sources: "Wake Forest 2018 Basketball Commitments". Rivals.; "2018 Wake Forest Demon Deacons Recruiting Class". ESPN.; "2018 Team Ranking". Rivals.

== College career ==
On August 26, 2017, Hoard committed to attend and play for Wake Forest University. Before the start of the 2018–19 season, Hoard was named to the Julius Erving Award preseason watchlist. On November 10, 2018, Hoard scored 19 points and 13 rebounds in a 90–78 win against North Carolina A&T. On November 18, 2018, the Demon Deacons would defeat Valparaiso 69–63 behind Hoard's 14 points and 9 rebounds. On January 2, 2019, he scored 23 points and 15 rebounds in an 83–61 victory over Cornell. On January 15, 2019, Hoard scored 16 points and 10 rebounds in a 71–67 victory over NC State. On February 5, 2019, Hoard tallied 19 points and a career high 17 rebounds in a win over Pittsburgh. As a freshman at Wake Forest, Hoard averaged 13.1 points, 7.6 rebounds, and 1.5 assist per game.

== National team career ==
Hoard made his debut with the French youth national team at the 2015 FIBA Europe Under-16 Championship in Kaunas, Lithuania. In his first game at the event, he recorded 16 points and 6 rebounds to help defeat Croatia. At the tournament, he averaged 7.7 points, 4.0 rebounds, and 1.2 steals per game, leading France to a fifth-place finish.

In April 2016, Hoard represented France at the Albert Schweitzer Tournament, playing six games and averaging 7.0 points, 2.0 rebounds, and 1.3 steals per game, en route to fourth place. He was considered one of the top prospects from the event, although basketball website NBAdraft.net said that he "underachieved." However, Hoard drew attention later in the year, at the 2016 FIBA Under-17 World Championship, held in Zaragoza, Spain. He averaged a team-high 22.4 points, 5.7 rebounds, 3.1 assists, and 1.7 steals per game, as France finished in sixth place. On June 23, 2016, in his opening game, Hoard erupted for 41 points against South Korea, shooting 15-of-28 from the field. The performance tied the tournament's single-game scoring record set by Isaac Humphries in 2014.

== Professional career ==
=== Portland Trail Blazers (2019–2020) ===
Hoard went undrafted in the 2019 NBA draft. On July 1, 2019, Hoard signed a two-way contract with the Portland Trail Blazers.

On October 27, 2019, Hoard was assigned to the Texas Legends of the NBA G League by the Portland Trail Blazers. Hoard participated in the 2020 NBA Bubble.

=== Oklahoma City Thunder / Blue (2021–2022) ===
On December 4, 2020, Hoard signed with the Oklahoma City Thunder, but was waived three days later. On January 28, 2021, he was included in the roster of the Oklahoma City Blue. In 15 games, he averaged 9.7 points, 4.9 rebounds and 2.0 assists in 22.0 minutes per contest while shooting 49.1 percent from the field.

On April 5, 2021, the Oklahoma City Thunder signed Hoard to a two-way contract.

Hoard rejoined the Oklahoma City Blue for the 2021–22 season.

On December 29, 2021, Hoard signed a 10-day contract with the Thunder and returned to the Blue after it expired. On April 1, he signed a second 10-day contract with the Thunder. On April 6, 2022, he recorded career highs of 24 points and 21 rebounds against his former team, Portland Trail Blazers.

=== Hapoel Tel Aviv (2022–2024) ===
On August 14, 2022, Hoard signed with Hapoel Tel Aviv of the Israeli Basketball Premier League. On July 31, 2023, he signed two-year extension with the club.

=== Maccabi Tel Aviv (2024–present) ===
In July 2024, Hoard signed with Maccabi Tel Aviv of the Israeli Premier League and the EuroLeague.

== National team career ==
Hoard was on the France national team's preliminary roster for the 2024 Olympics. He played at EuroBasket 2025 and averaged 8.4 points and 3.8 rebounds per game.

== Personal ==
Hoard's mother, Katia Foucade Hoard, played point guard at Washington and was on the French women's national team at the 1994 FIBA World Championship for Women. She returned home to France and played professionally as well.

== Career statistics ==
Legend
GP	Games played	GS	Games started	MPG	Minutes per game
FG%	Field goal percentage	3P%	3-point field goal percentage	FT%	Free throw percentage
RPG	Rebounds per game	APG	Assists per game	SPG	Steals per game
BPG	Blocks per game	PPG	Points per game	**Bold**	Career high

=== NBA ===
==== Regular season ====
Year	Team	GP	GS	MPG	FG%	3P%	FT%	RPG	APG	SPG	BPG	PPG
2019–20	Portland	13	0	7.9	.469	.000	.615	2.5	.3	.4	.0	2.9
2020–21	Oklahoma City	**19**	0	16.8	**.500**	.000	**.683**	3.4	1.3	.7	.3	6.1
2021–22	Oklahoma City	7	**5**	**34.2**	.489	**.360**	.429	**12.0**	**2.4**	**.9**	**.7**	**14.7**
Career		39	5	17.0	.490	.231	.618	4.6	1.2	.6	.3	6.6

==== Playoffs ====
Year	Team	GP	GS	MPG	FG%	3P%	FT%	RPG	APG	SPG	BPG	PPG
2020	Portland	3	0	13.7	.583	—	—	3.0	.3	.0	.0	4.7
Career		3	0	13.7	.583	—	—	3.0	.3	.0	.0	4.7

=== College ===
Year	Team	GP	GS	MPG	FG%	3P%	FT%	RPG	APG	SPG	BPG	PPG
2018–19	Wake Forest	31	30	30.2	.458	.226	.717	7.6	1.5	.6	.6	13.1
