= Jared Harper =

American basketball player (born 1997)

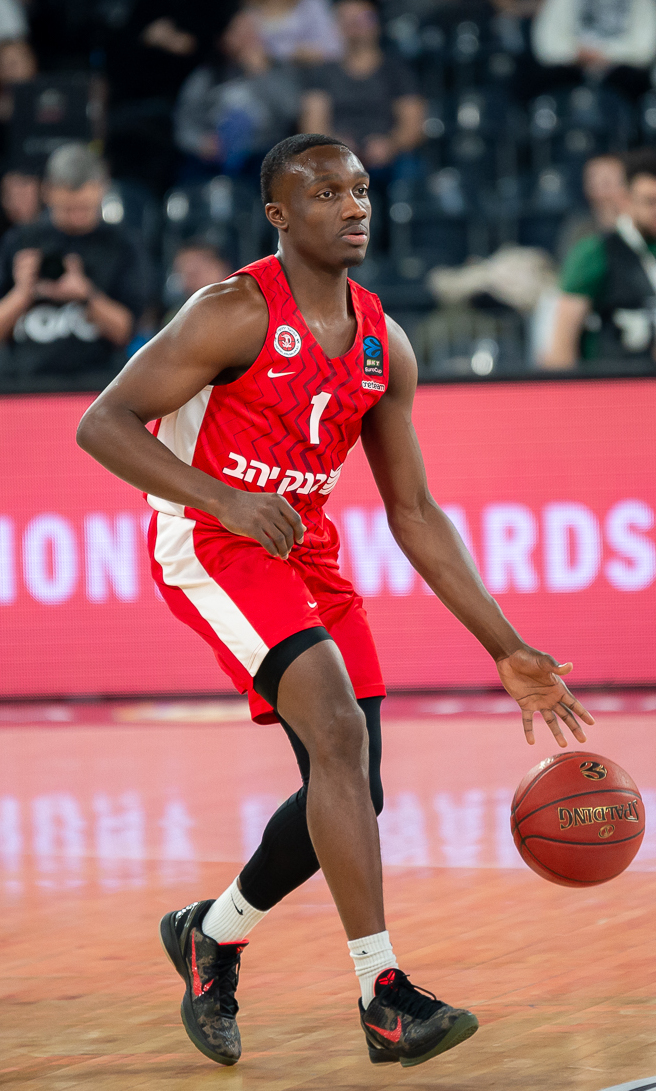
- Harper with Hapoel Jerusalem in 2025

No. 1 – Hapoel Jerusalem
- Position: Point guard
- League: Israeli Basketball Premier League; EuroCup

Personal information
- Born: September 14, 1997 (age 29) Atlanta, Georgia, U.S.
- Listed height: 5 ft 10 in (1.78 m)
- Listed weight: 175 lb (79 kg)

Career information
- High school: Pebblebrook (Mableton, Georgia)
- College: Auburn (2016–2019)
- NBA draft: 2019: undrafted
- Playing career: 2019–present

Career history
- 2019–2020: Phoenix Suns
- 2019–2020: →Northern Arizona Suns
- 2020–2021: New York Knicks
- 2021: →Westchester Knicks
- 2021: Birmingham Squadron
- 2021–2022: New Orleans Pelicans
- 2022: →Birmingham Squadron
- 2022–2024: Valencia
- 2024–present: Hapoel Jerusalem

Career highlights
- 2× EuroCup MVP (2025, 2026); 2× All-EuroCup First Team (2025, 2026); EuroCup Top Scorer (2025); Israeli League MVP (2025); 2× All-Israeli League First Team (2025, 2026); Israeli League Cup winner (2025); Israeli League Cup MVP (2025); Israeli Super Cup winner (2025); All-NBA G League First Team (2021); All-NBA G League Third Team (2022); 2× Second-team All-SEC (2018, 2019)
- Stats at NBA.com
- Stats at Basketball Reference

Jared Lamar Harper (born September 14, 1997) is an American professional basketball player who plays for Hapoel Jerusalem of the Israeli Basketball Premier League and the EuroCup.

He played college basketball for the Auburn Tigers where he was the starting point guard on the Tigers first-ever Final Four team. In 2025, he was the Israeli Basketball Premier League MVP; he was also named the EuroCup Basketball MVP, a title he was awarded again the following year.

== Early life ==
Harper began playing basketball with a Nerf hoop in his dining room. He also played baseball and the saxophone during his childhood. In basketball, Harper usually faced older opponents despite being undersized. He often trained with his younger brother Jalen under the guidance of his father Patrick Harper, former point guard for Elizabeth City State University in North Carolina.

== High school career ==
Harper played basketball for Pebblebrook High School in Mableton, Georgia. As a junior in 2014–15, Harper averaged 21 points and seven assists per game, and led Pebblebrook to a school-best 27–6 record. Pebblebrook finished the season as Georgia Class 6A runners-up after losing to Joseph Wheeler High School, a team featuring top recruit Jaylen Brown, in the state title game.

In July 2015, Harper was named co-most valuable player (MVP) of the Nike Elite Youth Basketball League (EYBL) Peach Jam, after scoring 33 points with eight assists to help the Georgia Stars win the championship.

In his senior season with Pebblebrook, he averaged 27 points, 10.1 assists, 5.7 rebounds, and 3.7 steals, guiding his team to a 23–10 record and another Class 6A state championship appearance. Harper left high school as a two-time first-team All-State selection. He was a consensus four-star recruit in the 2016 class and committed to Auburn on March 19, 2015. His other NCAA Division I offers included Kansas State and Ole Miss.

== College career ==
Harper averaged 11.4 points, 3.0 assists, and 1.2 steals per game, starting 30 games for Auburn in his freshman season in 2016–17. On January 7, 2017, he scored a season-high 24 points, including 16 of Auburn's final 19 points, in an 88–85 loss to Ole Miss. Harper was named SEC Freshman of the Week twice during the season.

In 2017–18, through 34 games as a sophomore, he averaged 13.2 points, 5.4 assists (3rd in the conference), and 1.2 steals per game while shooting .822 (5th) from the free throw line. On February 3, 2018, Harper posted a double-double of 14 points and 14 assists in a 93–81 win over Vanderbilt. He was one assist away from matching the school record for assists in a game, set by Eddie Johnson in 1976. One week later, Harper tied his scoring career-high, contributing 24 points and seven assists in a 78–61 victory over Georgia. He was a second-team All-SEC selection by the Associated Press and conference coaches.

Harper made his junior season debut on November 6, 2018, by recording his second career double-double, with 20 points and 13 assists, in a 101–58 win over South Alabama. On December 15, 2018, he scored a career-best 31 points in a 75–71 overtime win over UAB. For the 2018–19 season he averaged 15.3 points (7th in the conference) and 5.8 assists (3rd) per game while shooting .828 (4th) from the free throw line. At the end of the regular season, Harper earned second-team All-SEC honors from the Associated Press and conference coaches. In the NCAA tournament, Harper helped lead the Tigers to their first ever Final Four with a team high 26 points in the Tigers Elite Eight win against Kentucky.

== Professional career ==
=== Phoenix Suns (2019–2020) ===
After his junior season concluded, Harper declared his entry into the 2019 NBA draft, forgoing his senior year at Auburn. However, he went undrafted. Harper later played for the Phoenix Suns during the 2019 NBA Summer League in Las Vegas. Following his performance in the Summer League, he signed a two-way contract with Phoenix. On October 23, 2019, Harper made his NBA debut coming off the bench in a 124–95 victory over the Sacramento Kings. In three games for Phoenix during 2019-20, Harper averaged 2.7 minutes per game.

On December 20, Harper recorded 25 points and dished out a career-high 13 assists in a 94–99 loss to the Fort Wayne Mad Ants. On January 18, 2020, Harper scored 31 points to go with seven assists, four rebounds and two steals in the G League for the Northern Arizona Suns in a 120–109 loss to the Sioux Falls Skyforce. On March 14, Harper was waived by Phoenix. In 33 games for Northern Arizona in 2019-20, Harper averaged 29.8 minutes, 20.8 points, 5.7 assists, and 1.2 steals per game.

=== New York Knicks (2020–2021) ===
On June 25, 2020, the New York Knicks announced that they had claimed Harper off waivers. On November 25, Harper re-signed with the Knicks to a two-way contract with the Westchester Knicks. On April 23, New York converted his two-way contract into a 10-day contract. Ten days later, the Knicks signed him to another two-way contract. He appeared in eight games with New York averaging 2.0 minutes per game, and 12 games with Westchester, averaging 21.3 points, 2.9 rebounds, 0.8 steals, and a team-high 6.9 assists with the latter.

=== New Orleans Pelicans / Birmingham Squadron (2021–2022) ===
On September 24, 2021, Harper signed with the New Orleans Pelicans. However, he was waived on October 9. On October 25, he signed with the Birmingham Squadron as an affiliate player. In 14 games, he averaged 21.3 points, 6.9 assists, and 2.9 rebounds in 32.7 minutes per game.

On December 21, 2021, Harper signed a two-way deal with the New Orleans Pelicans. However, he was waived on January 9, 2022 and was re-acquired by Birmingham three days later. In 37 games for Birmingham in 2021-22, Harper averaged 33.5 minutes, 21.2 points, 6.3 assists, and 1.5 steals per game, while shooting .411 from three-point range.

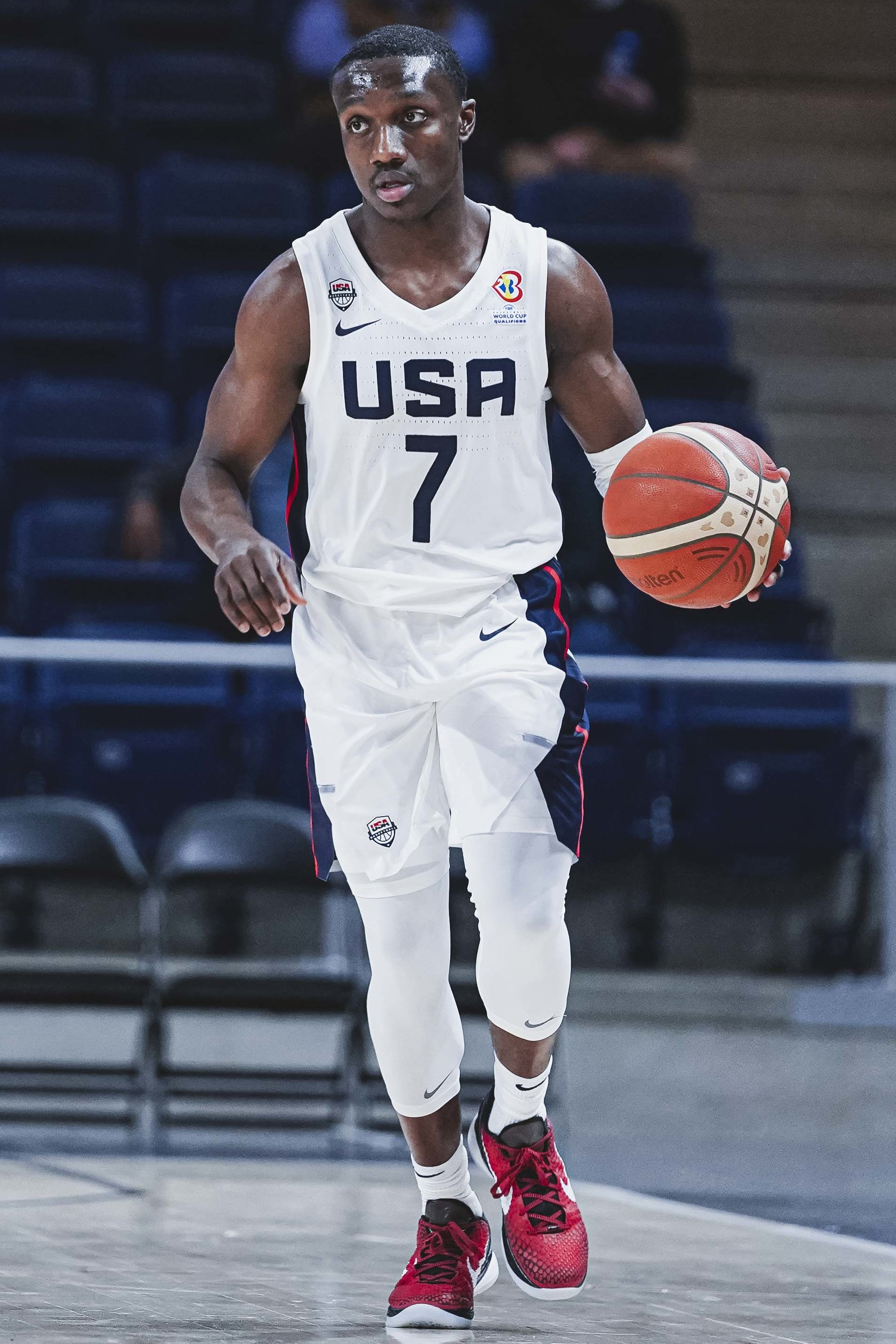
Harper playing with Team USA in 2022

In February 2022, he played with the United States men's national basketball team in FIBA World Cup Qualifying.

On March 29, he signed a new two-way deal with the Pelicans. On April 9, Harper scored a career-high 12 points, alongside a career-high three steals, in a 114–141 loss to the Memphis Grizzlies. The next day, he logged a career-high nine assists, alongside ten points, in a 107–128 loss to the Golden State Warriors. In five games for the Pelicans in 2021-22, Harper averaged 8.6 minutes, 7.4 points, 2.8 assists, and 0.8 steals per game.

=== Valencia (2022–2024) ===
On September 7, 2022, Harper signed with Valencia Basket of the Spanish Liga ACB and the EuroLeague. In 2022-23 he averaged 10.3 points and 2.8 assists per game, while shooting .849 from the free throw line.

On August 1, 2023, Harper renewed his contract for another year. In 2023-24 he averaged 7.8 points and 1.8 assists per game, while shooting .844 from the free throw line. On June 13, 2024, Harper parted ways with the Spanish club after two seasons.

=== Hapoel Jerusalem (2024–present) ===
In July 2024, Harper signed a two-year contract with Hapoel Jerusalem of the Israeli Basketball Premier League, and was happy to return to playing alongside his close friend Austin Wiley who had also played at Auburn.

Harper was named MVP of Round five times in the 2024–25 regular season of the EuroCup, tying the record for most ever in EuroCup history. In 2024-25, playing for Hapoel Jerusalem he averaged 20.2 points, 5.3 assists, and 1.2 steals per game while shooting .866 from the free throw line. Despite Hapoel Jerusalem not making it to the tournament's semi finals, he was named EuroCup MVP. He scored 22.8 points per game, leading the league, which was the most for a player since Milan Gurović in the 2006–07 season, and led the league in index rating with 27.2 per game.

In 2025-26, playing for Hapoel Jerusalem he averaged 18.7 points, 6.2 assists, and 1.0 steals per game while shooting .858 from the free throw line. He ranked 2nd in the EuroCup in scoring, and 5th in assists. In April 2026, Harper was named the 2025-2026 EuroCup Most Valuable Player. He made history as the first player to win the award twice.

In August 2026, Harper tore a thumb ligament while training, leading to him being unable to play for several months.

== Career statistics ==
Legend
GP	Games played	GS	Games started	MPG	Minutes per game
FG%	Field-goal percentage	3P%	3-point field-goal percentage	FT%	Free-throw percentage
RPG	Rebounds per game	APG	Assists per game	SPG	Steals per game
BPG	Blocks per game	PPG	Points per game	PIR	Performance index rating
**Bold**	Career high

=== NBA ===
==== Regular season ====
Year	Team	GP	GS	MPG	FG%	3P%	FT%	RPG	APG	SPG	BPG	PPG
2019–20	Phoenix	3	0	2.7	.250	.000	—	.0	.0	.0	.0	.7
2020–21	New York	**8**	0	2.0	.000	.000	.750	.3	.1	.0	.0	.4
2021–22	New Orleans	5	0	**8.6**	**.538**	**.417**	**1.000**	**.4**	**2.8**	**.8**	**.3**	**7.4**
Career		16	0	4.2	.441	.333	.875	.3	.9	.3	.1	2.6

=== EuroLeague ===
Year	Team	GP	GS	MPG	FG%	3P%	FT%	RPG	APG	SPG	BPG	PPG	PIR
2022–23	Valencia	**31**	**5**	**17.8**	**.384**	**.331**	.823	**.8**	**3.3**	.5	.0	**10.4**	**8.9**
2023–24	Valencia	22	2	16.5	.367	.253	**.853**	**.8**	2.2	**.6**	—	8.5	6.5
Career		53	7	17.3	.377	.300	.833	.8	2.8	.5	.0	9.6	7.9

=== College ===
*	Led NCAA Division I

Year	Team	GP	GS	MPG	FG%	3P%	FT%	RPG	APG	SPG	BPG	PPG
2016–17	Auburn	32	30	24.2	.385	.344	.705	1.9	3.0	**1.2**	**.1**	11.4
2017–18	Auburn	34	34	30.5	.360	.355	.822	2.4	5.4	**1.2**	.0	13.2
2018–19	Auburn	**40***	**40***	**33.0**	**.399**	**.370**	**.828**	**2.5**	**5.8**	1.1	**.1**	**15.3**
Career		106	104	29.5	.384	.359	.792	2.3	4.8	1.2	.0	13.5
