= Hapoel Lod B.C. =

הפועל לוד Hapoel Lod B.C.
- Leagues: Liga Artzit
- Location: Lod, Israel
- Team colors: Red, White
Home	Away

Hapoel Lod is a basketball team representing Lod, Israel. The team competes in Liga Artzit.
