= Timmy Bowers =

American basketball player

No. 15 – Andrea Costa Imola
- Position: Point guard
- League: European

Personal information
- Born: January 9, 1982 (age 44) Milwaukee, Wisconsin, U.S.
- Listed height: 6 ft 2 in (1.88 m)
- Listed weight: 192 lb (87 kg)

Career information
- High school: Harrison Central (Gulfport, Mississippi)
- College: Mississippi State (2000–2004)
- NBA draft: 2004: undrafted
- Playing career: 2004–2020

Career history
- 2004–2005: Asheville Altitude
- 2005: Gulf Coast Bandits
- 2005–2006: Maccabi Giv'at Shmuel
- 2006–2009: Hapoel Jerusalem
- 2009–2011: Pepsi Caserta
- 2011–2013: Umana Reyer Venezia
- 2013–2014: PMS Torino
- 2015: Koroivos Amaliadas
- 2015–2016: Ferentino
- 2016–2017: Aurora Basket Jesi
- 2017–2018: Pallacanestro Biella
- 2018–present: Andrea Costa Imola

Career highlights
- 2× All SEC Performer. Third Team (2003) First Team (2004); All WBA First Team (2005); NBA G League Champion (2005); All Serie A Italian League Second Team (2010); All Italian Lega Due First Team (2017); MVP Israeli Super League MVP (2006); Israeli Super League Cup Champion (2006); Israeli Super League Cup Champion (2007); Mississippi Mr. Basketball (2000)

Timothy Jermaine Bowers (born January 9, 1982) is an American former professional basketball player. He was named the 2006 Israeli Basketball Premier League MVP. At 6' 2", he is capable of playing both guard positions.

== Early life ==
He grew up in Gulfport, Mississippi where he graduated from Harrison Central High School. He studied at Mississippi State University and signed up for the 2004 NBA draft after graduation. He was not drafted.

== Career ==
After the NBA Draft he tried his luck playing with the Los Angeles Lakers Summer League Team and then moved on to the Asheville Altitude from the NBDL (now NBA G League), winning the 2004–2005 NBDL Championship. At season's end, he signed on to play with the Phoenix Suns in the NBA Summer League, after which he chose to continue his career abroad.

Then he decided to play in Israel, after signing with Maccabi Giv'at Shmuel, and became the league top scorer after averaging 21.8 ppg, 5.3 rpg, and 3.6 apg in the 2005–2006 season. He was named the 2006 Israeli Basketball Premier League MVP.

In 2006/07 and 2007/08 he won the Israeli state cup with Hapoel Jerusalem.

In February 2015, he signed with Koroivos Amaliadas of the Greek Basket League. Bowers spent the 2017–18 season with Pallacanestro Biella and posted 13.1 points, 4.9 rebounds and 3.5 assists per game. He signed with the Serie A2 club Andrea Costa Imola on July 18, 2018.
