= Jimmy Clark III =

American basketball player (born 2001)

- Clark with Maccabi Tel Aviv in 2026

No. 2 – Maccabi Tel Aviv
- Position: Point guard / shooting guard
- League: Israeli Premier League; EuroLeague

Personal information
- Born: April 4, 2001 (age 25) Covington, Georgia, U.S.
- Listed height: 1.91 m (6 ft 3 in)
- Listed weight: 79 kg (174 lb)

Career information
- High school: Newton (Covington, Georgia)
- College: VCU (2019–2021); Duquesne (2022–2024)
- NBA draft: 2024: undrafted
- Playing career: 2024–present

Career history
- 2024–2025: Bnei Herzliya
- 2025–present: Maccabi Tel Aviv

Career highlights
- Israeli Premier League champion (2026); All-Israeli League First Team (2026)

Jimmy Clark III (born April 4, 2001) is an American professional basketball player for Maccabi Tel Aviv of the Israeli Premier League and the EuroLeague. He played college basketball for the VCU Rams and the Duquesne Dukes. Standing at a height of 1.91 m (6 ft 3 in), Clark plays as a combo guard.

== Early life and high school career ==
Born in Covington, Georgia, Clark attended and played basketball for Newton High School in his hometown, where he averaged 20 points per game as a senior.

== College career ==
Clark started his college basketball career with VCU, appearing in 33 games over two seasons. Averaging 5.9 points per game in his second season, Clark was dismissed from the team due to a university suspension in February 2021. Clark played the following season for Northwest Florida State College of the NJCAA. In 2022, he returned to the NCAA with Duquesne. Playing 70 games in two seasons, Clark averaged 15 points per game as a senior. He was also selected to the Men's Atlantic 10 Conference All-Defensive team in 2023.

== Professional career ==
After finishing his college basketball career, Clark signed for Bnei Herzliya of the Israeli Premier League in August 2024. Averaging 14.5 points, 5.8 assists and 2 steals in 17 league games, Clark signed for Maccabi Tel Aviv of the Israeli Premier League and the EuroLeague in February 2025. He signed a contract through the end of the 2026–27 season.

Earning an important role in his second season with the Yellows, Clark scored a buzzer-beater to win a EuroLeague game against Partizan in February 2026.

On May 10, 2026, Clark signed a 3-year contract extension with Maccabi Tel Aviv keeping him with the team until 2029.

== Career statistics ==
Legend
GP	Games played	GS	Games started	MPG	Minutes per game
FG%	Field goal percentage	3P%	3-point field goal percentage	FT%	Free throw percentage
RPG	Rebounds per game	APG	Assists per game	SPG	Steals per game
BPG	Blocks per game	PPG	Points per game	**Bold**	Career high

=== EuroLeague ===
Year	Team	GP	GS	MPG	FG%	3P%	FT%	RPG	APG	SPG	BPG	PPG	PIR
2024–25	Maccabi Tel Aviv	8	2	19.0	.418	.333	.800	2.4	4.0	1.1	.1	10.0	8.8

=== Domestic leagues ===
Year	Team	League	GP	MPG	FG%	3P%	FT%	RPG	APG	SPG	BPG	PPG
2024–25	(Israel) Bnei Herzliya	Ligat HaAl	17	28.9	.459	.289	.738	3.1	5.8	2.0	.6	14.5
2024–25	(Israel) Maccabi Tel Aviv	Ligat HaAl	9	19.3	.507	.429	.750	2.0	3.7	1.0	.2	11.0

=== College ===
Year	Team	GP	GS	MPG	FG%	3P%	FT%	RPG	APG	SPG	BPG	PPG
2019–20	VCU	17	0	7.3	.371	.214	.583	.8	.8	.4	.1	2.1
2020–21	VCU	16	0	16.1	**.500**	.240	**.842**	1.4	1.8	1.8	**.3**	5.9
2022–23	Duquesne	33	32	29.0	.437	**.342**	.721	**4.0**	2.5	2.3	.1	12.2
2023–24	Duquesne	**37**	**37**	**31.0**	.415	.332	.713	3.3	**3.8**	**2.4**	**.3**	**15.0**
Career		103	69	24.1	.428	.326	.719	2.8	2.6	1.9	.2	10.6
