= Holon Toto Hall =

Indoor arena in Holon, Israel

Coordinates: 32°0′8″N 34°47′51″E

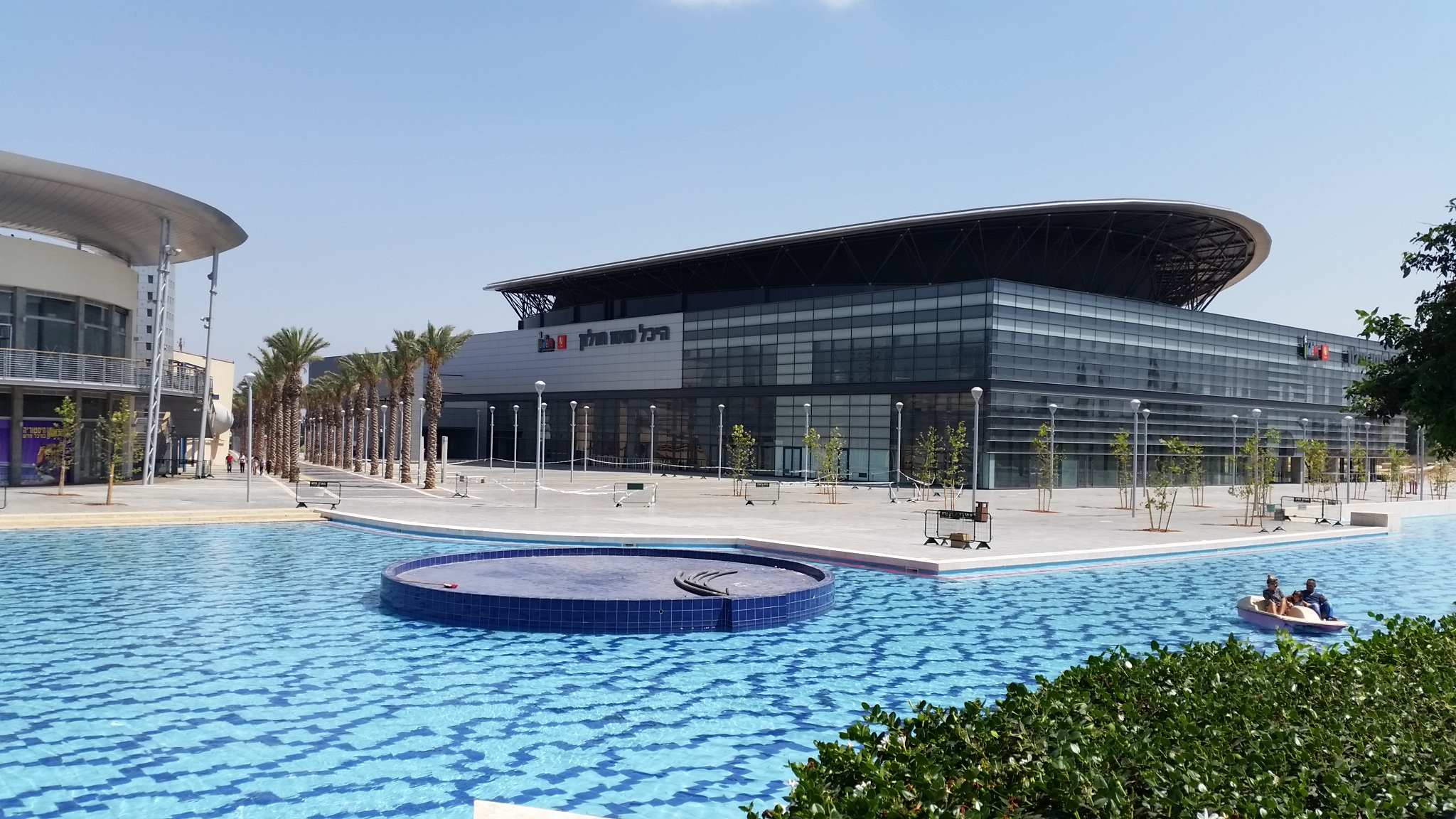
- Holon Toto Hall's exterior.
- Interactive map of Holon Toto Hall
- Location: Holon, Tel Aviv District, Israel
- Owner: Holon Municipality
- Operator: Park Peres Administration
- Capacity: Basketball: 5,500; Concerts: 4,000

Construction
- Groundbreaking: 2012
- Opened: 3 March 2015
- Cost: ₪ 160 million € 34 million

Tenants
- Hapoel Holon (2015-present): Major sporting events hosted; 2021 BIBL Final Four

Holon Toto Hall is an indoor arena that is located in the Tel Aviv District city of Holon, Israel. The arena is mainly used to host basketball games. It has a seating capacity of 5,500.

== History ==
Holon Toto Hall was opened in March 2015. In 2016, the arena hosted the Rhythmic Gymnastics European Championships. The arena has been used as the home arena of the Israeli Basketball Super League club Hapoel Holon.

== See also ==
- List of indoor arenas in Israel
