= Elitzur Ashkelon =

- Leagues: Israeli National League
- Founded: 2002
- Dissolved: 2017
- History: Elitzur Ashkelon (2002–2005); Ironi Ashkelon (2005–2012); Elitzur Ashkelon (2012–2017)
- Arena: Ashkelon Sport Arena
- Capacity: 3,000
- Location: Ashkelon, Israel
- Team colors: Blue, White
Home	Away

Elitzur Ashkelon (Hebrew: אליצור אשקלון) was a professional basketball team based in Ashkelon, south-west Israel. The team reached the quarterfinals of the EuroCup Challenge in 2006 and also won the 2006 League Cup. The club was dissolved in 2017.

== Honours ==
- Israeli League Cup

Winners (1): 2006

== Notable former players ==
- (Israel) Erez Markovich
- (United States) Terry Acox
- (Australia) CJ Bruton
- (Ukraine) Steve Burtt Jr.
- (United States) Marcus Hatten
- (United States) Paul Jones
- (Lithuania) Andrius Jurkūnas
- (United States) Wendell McKines
- (United States) Andrae Patterson
- (United States) Gabe Pruitt
- (United States) Omar Sneed
