= Malha Arena =

Indoor arena in Jerusalem, Israel

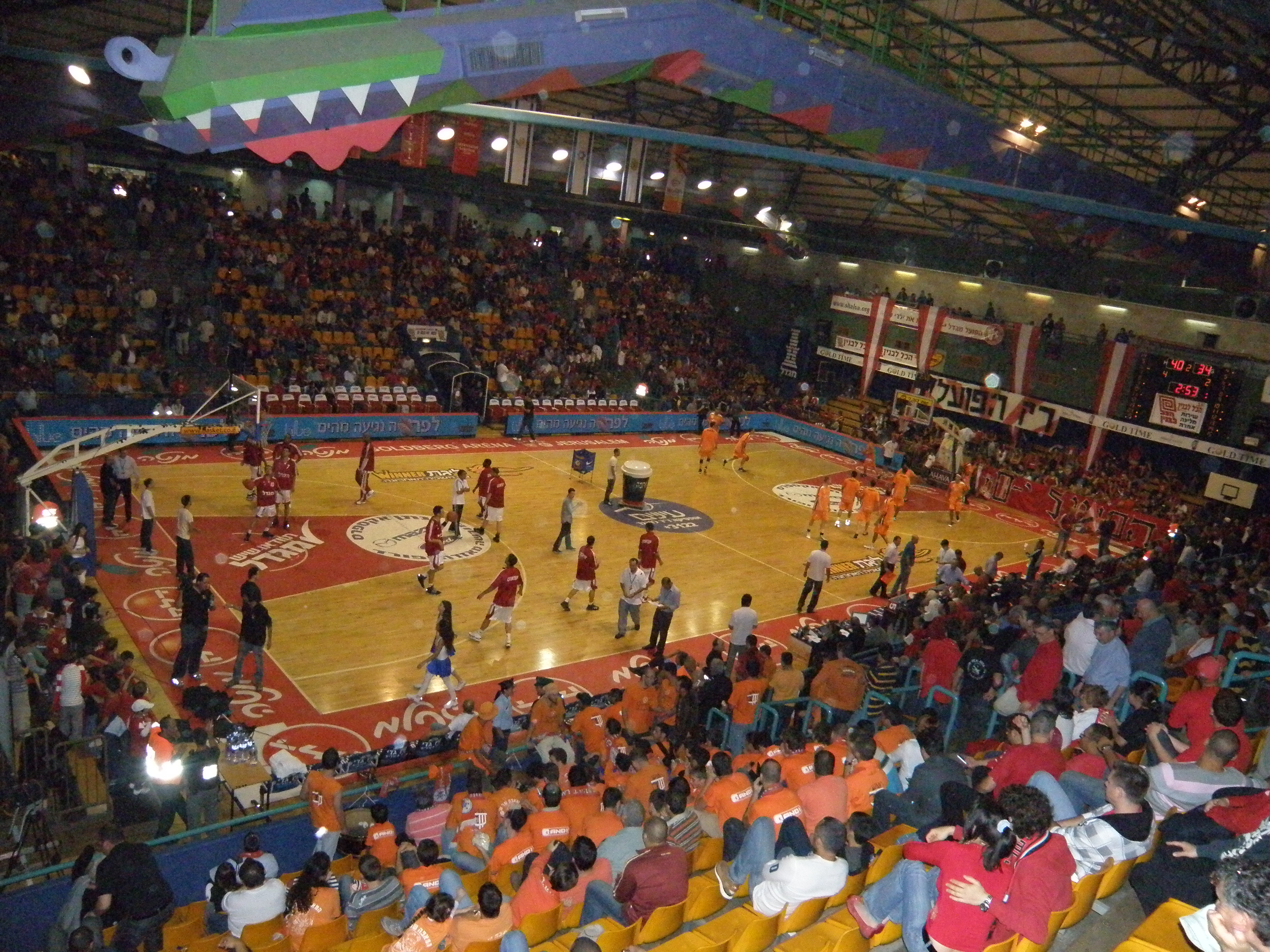
- Interactive map of Malha Arena
- Location: Jerusalem, Israel
- Coordinates: 31°45′23.84″N 35°10′52.04″E
- Capacity: 2,000

Construction
- Opened: 1985
- Renovated: 1997, 2010, 2013, 2017
- Expanded: 2010

Tenant
- Hapoel Jerusalem (1985–2014) Hapoel Jerusalem (Handball) (2021–Present)

The Malha Arena (officially called Lea and Maurice Goldberg Sports Hall) is a multi-purpose indoor arena that is located in Jerusalem's Malha neighborhood, across from Ramat Denya and Ramat Sharett. The arena is primarily used to host basketball, futsal, and handball games, and gymnastics.

Despite its small size, the arena traps in noise, and distracts the opposing team. This gives a boost to players towards the end of the game, when they need it most, according to the former head coach of Hapoel Jerusalem, Guy Goodes.

== History ==
Malha Arena was the home arena of the Hapoel Jerusalem professional basketball team, from 1985 until 2014, when the team moved to the newly constructed Pais Arena. Construction of the Jerusalem Arena began in 2009, in Malha, east of Teddy Stadium. The Jerusalem Arena eventually replaced the Malha Arena as Hapoel's home venue in 2014.

== See also ==
- Sports in Israel
