= Jerusalem Tennis and Education Center =

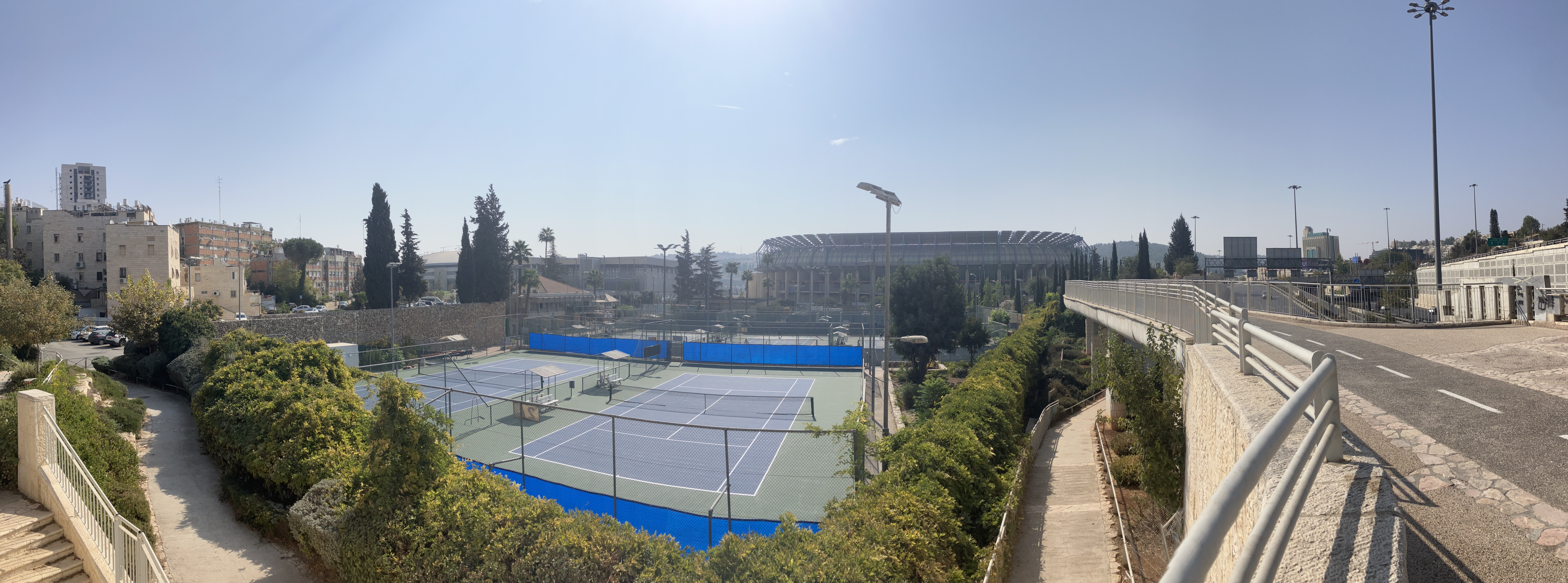
- Interactive map of Jerusalem Tennis and Education Center
- Address: 1 Avraham Almaliach Street, Jerusalem
- Public transit: at Malha Sports Complex

Construction
- Opened: July 27, 1981

Website
- https://tennis.org.il/centers/jerusalem/

Jerusalem Tennis and Education Center is one of the Israel Tennis Centers located in Malha Sports Park, near Teddy Stadium and Pais Arena Jerusalem.

== History ==
The establishment of the center began in 1979 by the Jerusalem Municipality as part of a neighborhood rehabilitation project in Katamon 8–9, funded by the Israel Tennis Centers and with assistance from the Jewish community in South Africa, and was named after the main donors Joyce and Ben Eisenberg. The center was inaugurated in July 1981, with 11 courts. Subsequently, 6 additional courts and a tennis stadium were built.

== Courts ==
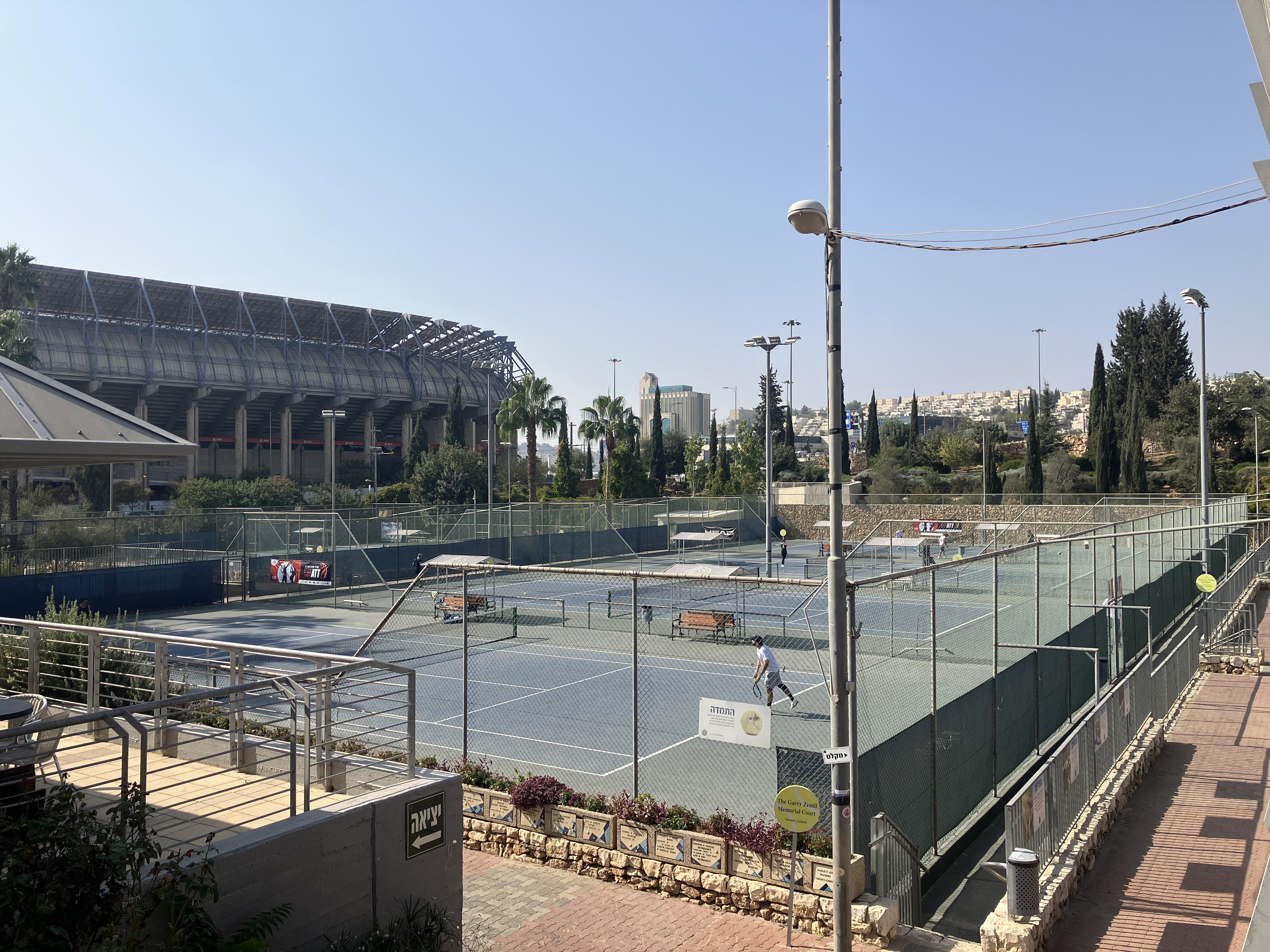
Tennis courts

Currently, the center has 14 active and lit tennis courts, including a stadium for 539 spectators, as well as 4 indoor courts nearing opening. Additionally, there is a padel court, gym, physiotherapy clinic, coaches and lecture room, restaurant, and sports equipment shop.

== The new complex ==
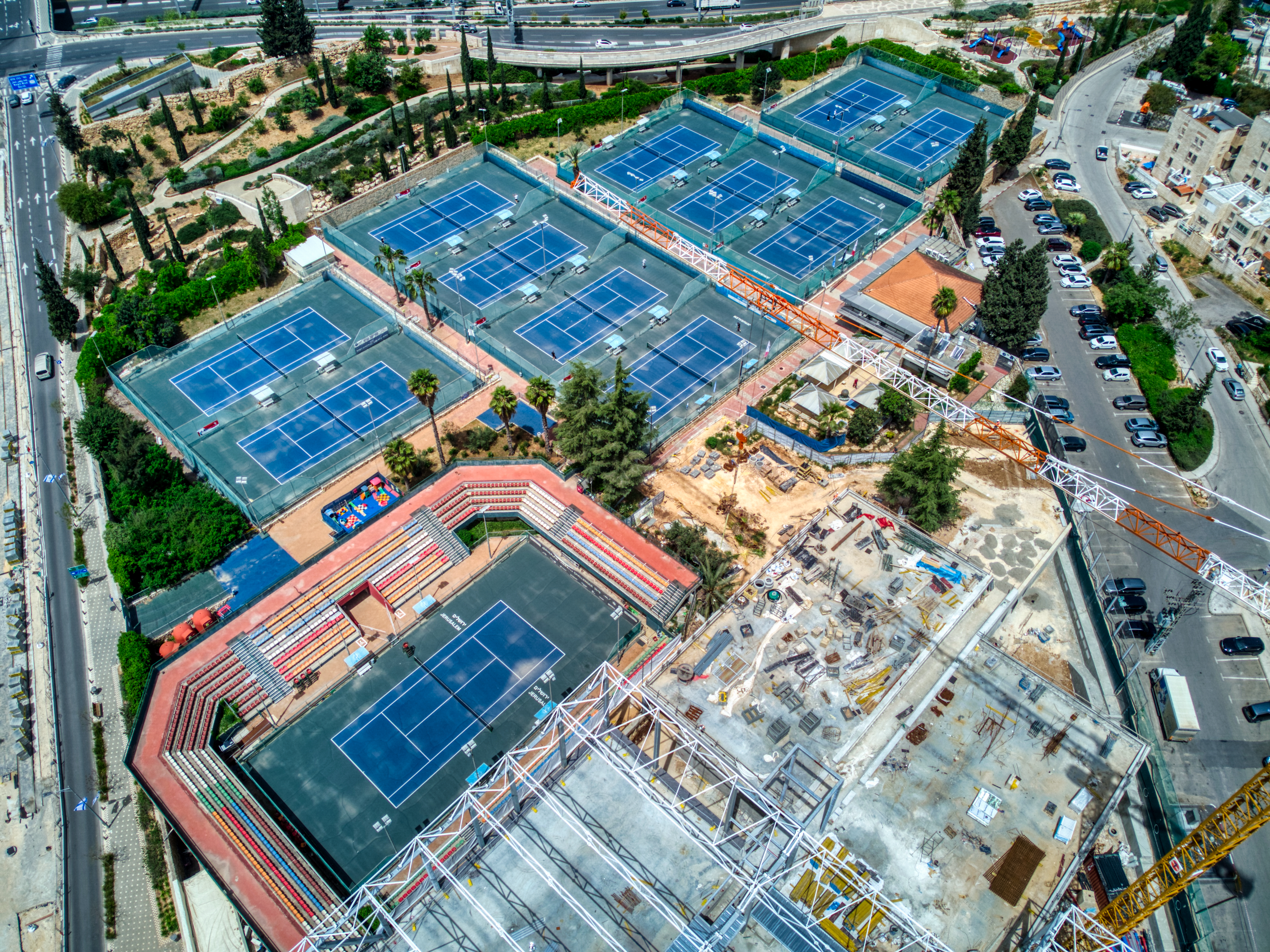
Tennis center during renovation (2023)

As part of laying the route of the L3 Line and the establishment of the Malha Sports Complex light rail station, eight tennis courts were demolished, including the indoor court and the tennis walls. However, as part of the light rail project budget, and with the help of a donation from Jewish-American philanthropist Stuart Weitzman, an upgrade of the tennis center was carried out and the new building Stuart Weitzman Tennis Complex was established, with an investment of over 70 million shekels, designed by HQ Architects, and executed by Moriah Company. The complex was inaugurated in July 2025 and is expected to fully open towards 2026.

The building, spanning a total area of approximately 9,000 square meters, consists of two underground floors and two floors above ground. The building's facade faces the light rail station and includes a new southern entrance to the tennis center, in addition to the existing entrance. The building uses natural ventilation systems for air conditioning.

On the upper level, six tennis courts were built, four of them covered and two open (these two have already opened for use). The facade of the covered courts building is constructed of louvers that allow partial closure while maintaining ventilation throughout the year, while not changing the ball trajectory and interfering with tennis play.

The building contains four squash halls, a judo hall, gym, commercial and catering spaces, clinic and treatment rooms, administration offices, equipment storage, and changing rooms.

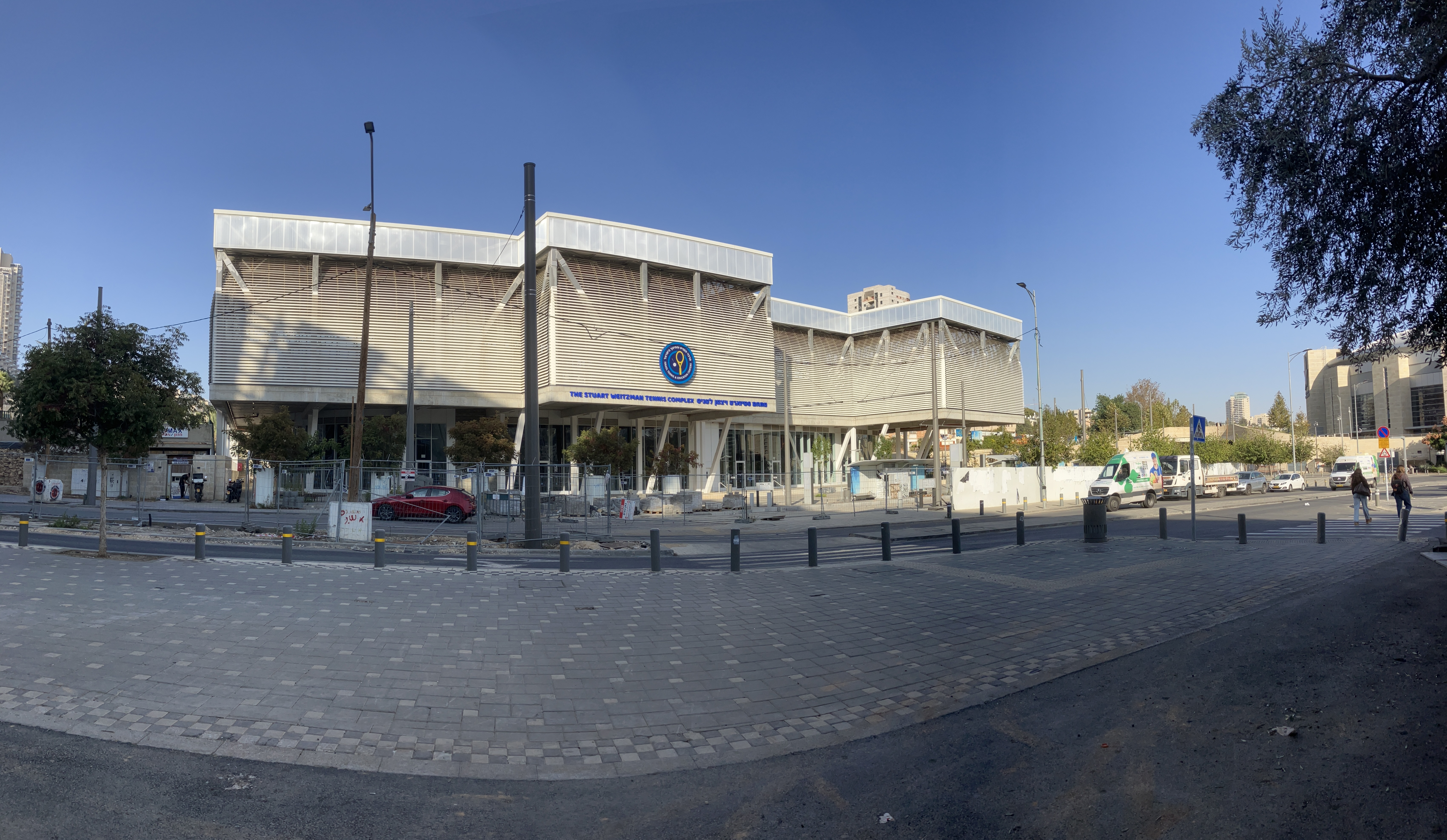
The Stuart Weitzman Tennis Complex (2025)

== Hosting competitions ==
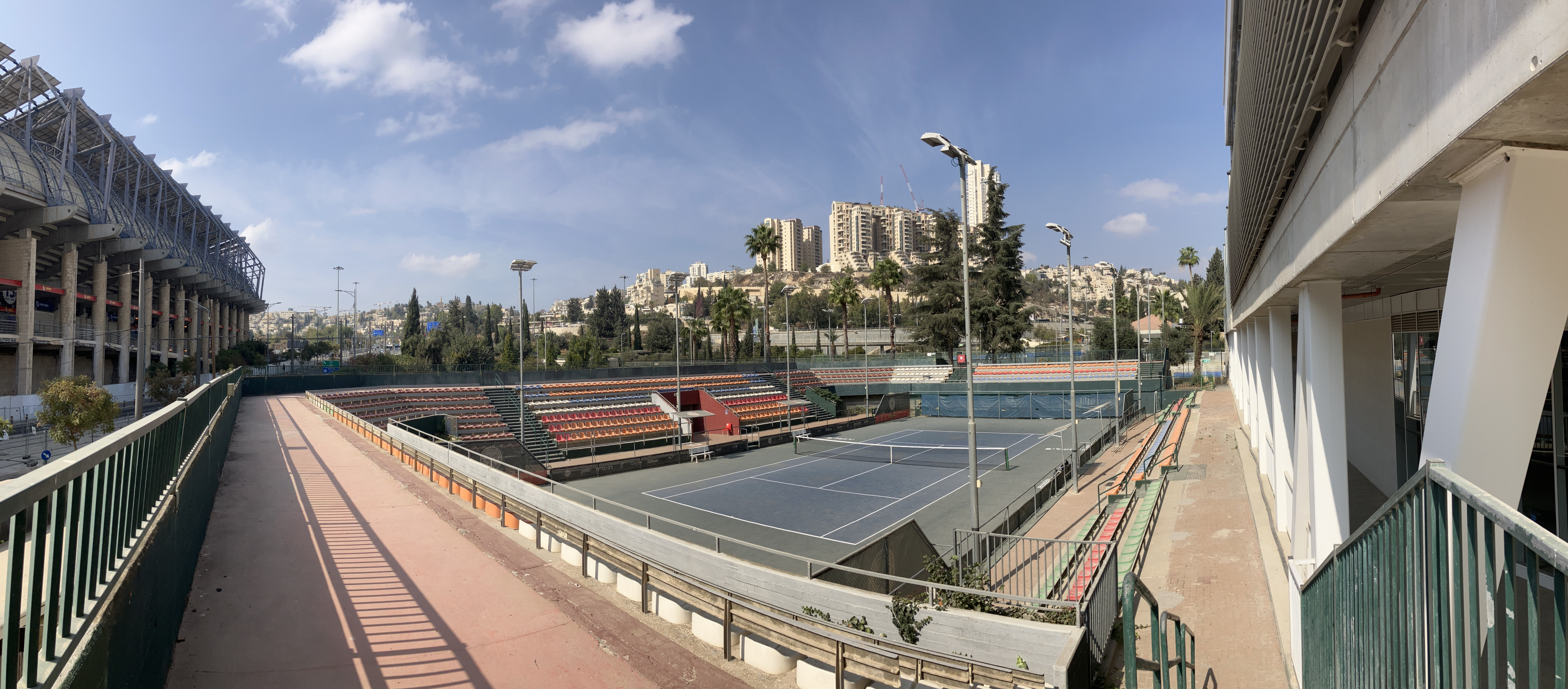
Tennis stadium (left Teddy Stadium, background Holyland Case)

The center has hosted numerous competitions over the years, such as the Eisenberg International Tournament with prizes totaling $50,000, Israeli Championships for adults and youth, competitions as part of the Maccabiah Games, national, regional and internal competitions, and Israel Tennis Centers championships.

The center's peak event was in 1984 when the Israeli team hosted the Polish team in the Davis Cup and won 5–0. In 1987, a showcase match was held at the same stadium between Amos Mansdorf and Jimmy Connors.

In December 2018, the tennis center returned to hosting the Israeli Tennis Championship after many years without hosting it.

The tennis center hosted the Israeli Championship in December 2024 and is expected to host the 2025 Israeli Championship again.

== Notable alumni ==
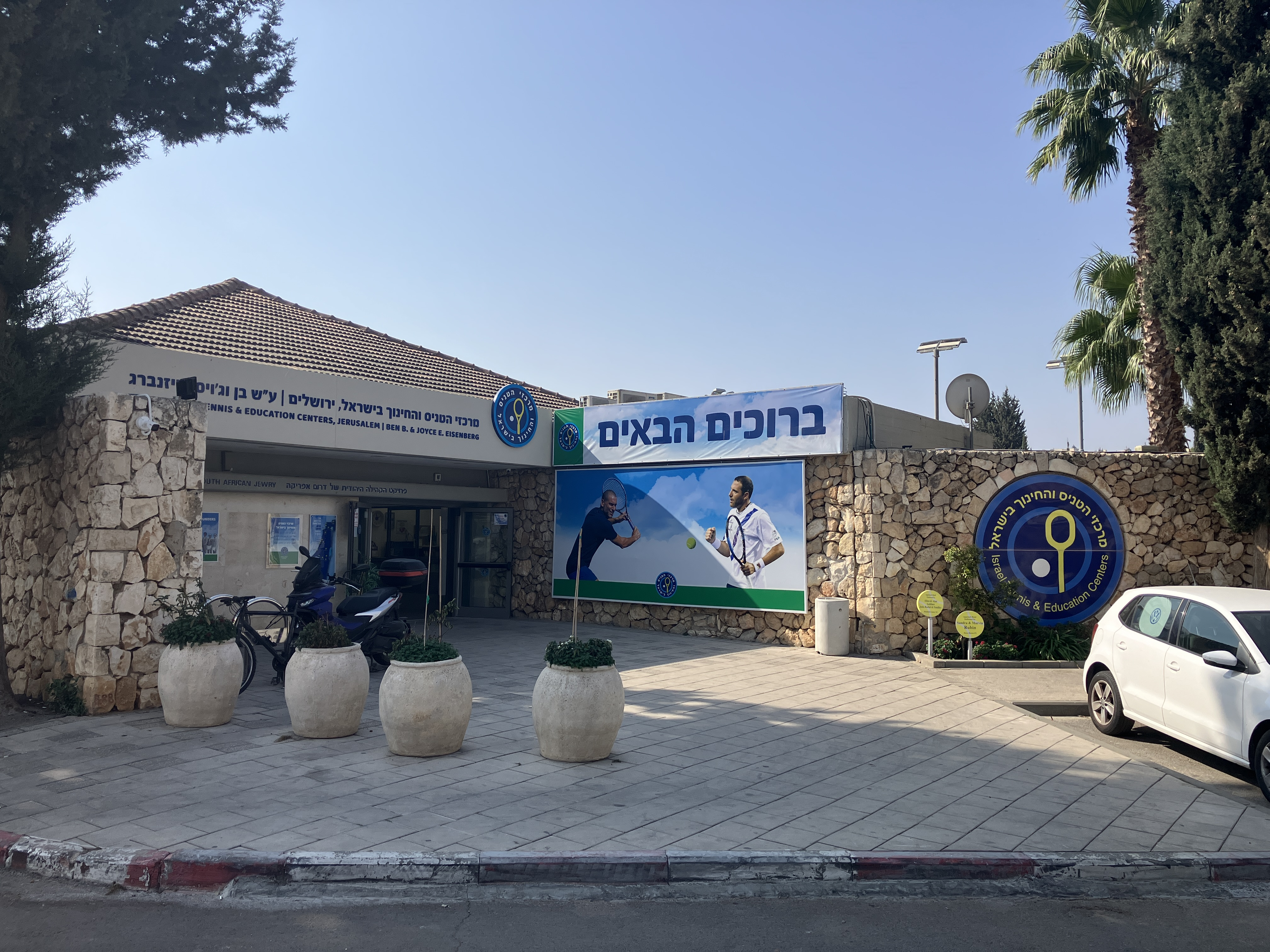
Northern entrance of the center, sign features Andy Ram and Yoni Erlich

Over the years, dozens of male and female players have grown up at the Jerusalem center, winning titles as Israeli youth champions and in numerous national competitions. The most famous player who grew up at the center is Andy Ram, a member of Israel's Davis Cup team, who took his first steps on the Jerusalem courts at age five and a half. Julia Glushko, who won Israeli youth and adult championships and represents Israel in the Fed Cup, also took her first steps at the Jerusalem center.
