= Teddy (disambiguation) =

Teddy is a masculine nickname or given name.

Teddy or TEDDY may also refer to:

== Arts and entertainment ==
- Teddy (album), an album by Teddy Pendergrass
- Teddy (film), an Indian animated film
- Teddy (musical), a 1956 British stage musical
- "Teddy" (story), a story by J. D. Salinger in Nine Stories
- Teddy Award, an international film award for films with LGBT topics

== Science and technology ==
- Terminology for the Description of Dynamics, an ontology in systems biology
- The Environmental Determinants of Diabetes in the Young, a study examining causes of juvenile diabetes
- Teddy, a Guinea pig breed

== Other uses ==
- Teddy bear, a type of toy bear
- Teddy (cigarette), a Norwegian brand
- Teddy (dog), an American canine film performer, active 1915–1924
- Teddy (horse), a racehorse
- Teddy (garment), a form of bodysuit-style garment
- Teddy, Kentucky, an unincorporated community in the US
- Teddy Air, a defunct Norwegian regional airline
- Teddy Stadium, a football stadium in Jerusalem named after Teddy Kollek
- Teddy Award, issued by the Canadian Taxpayers Federation for examples of high taxes and government waste

== See also ==
- Teddy bear (disambiguation)
- Teddy Boy, a phenomenon in youth culture since the 1950s
- Tedi
