= Malha Sports Complex =

Israeli sporting facilities complex

Coordinates: 31.7511°N 35.1927°E

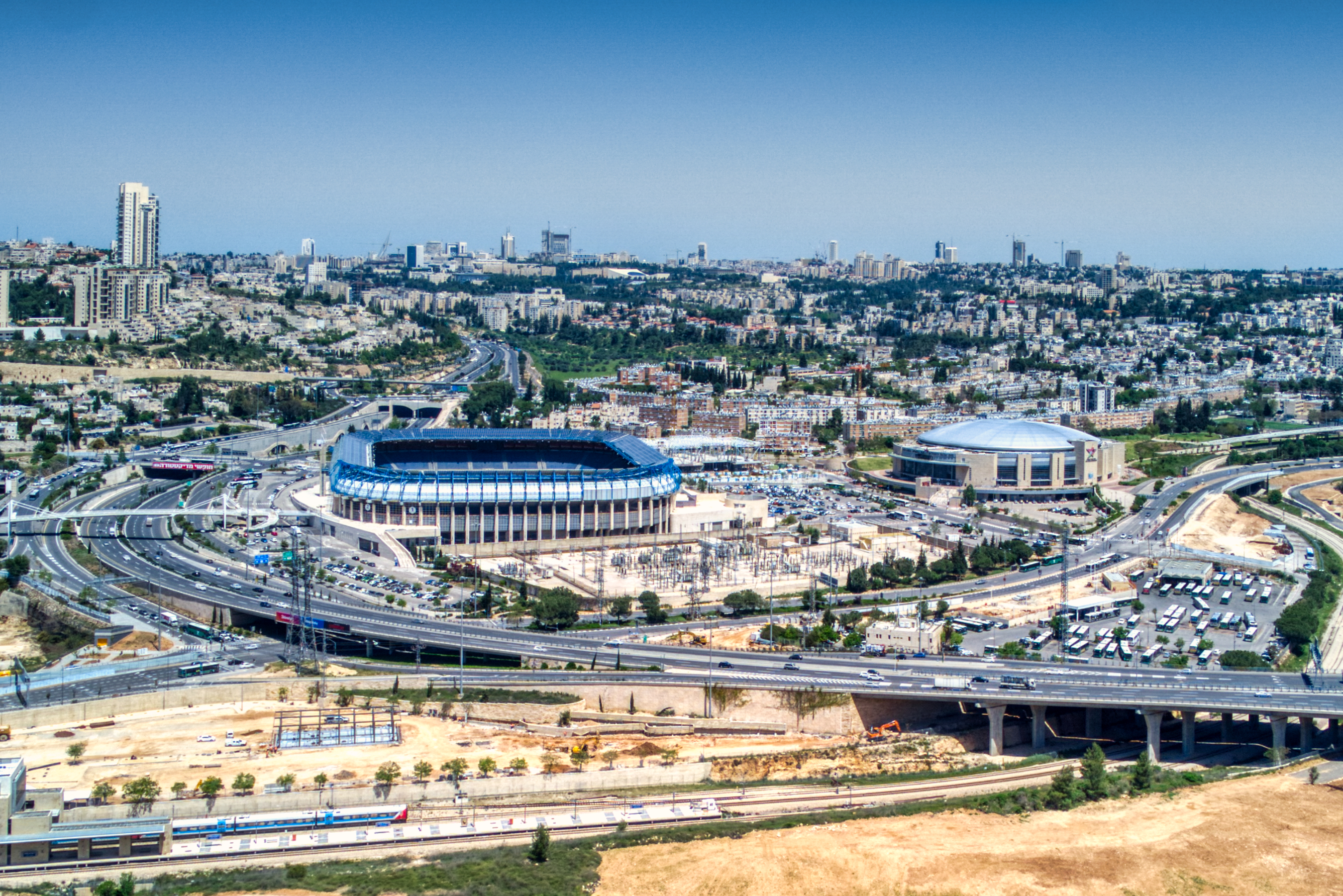
- Interactive map of Malha Sports Complex
- Location: Malha, Jerusalem, Israel
- Owner: Municipality of Jerusalem
- Public transit: at Malha Sports Complex

The Malha Sports Complex (Hebrew: קריית הספורט מלחה) is an Israeli sporting facilities complex located in the Malha neighborhood of southwestern Jerusalem, Israel. The complex consists of major venues as well as other supplementary sport, recreation and entertainment facilities.

== Venues ==
=== Teddy Stadium ===
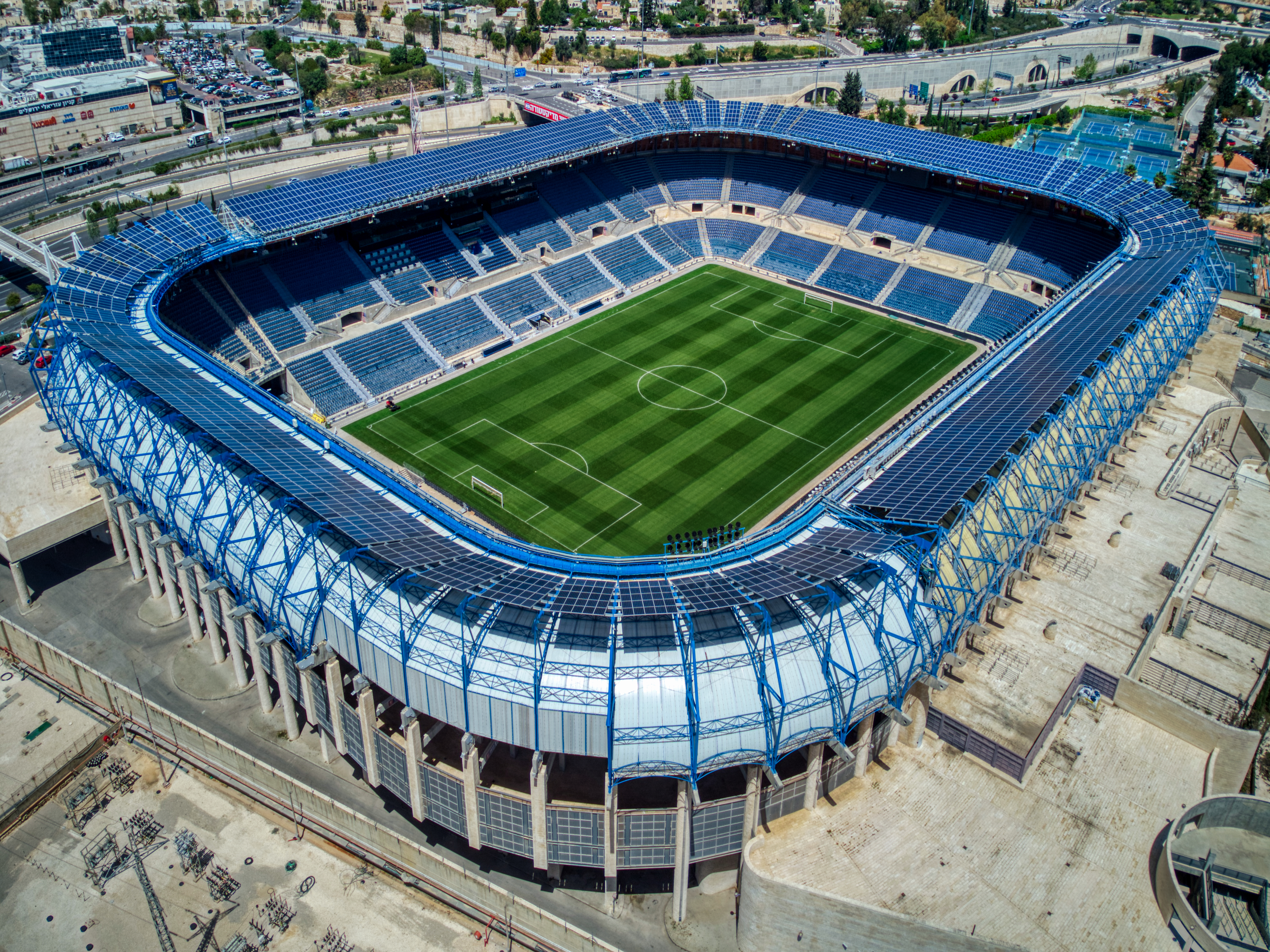
Teddy Stadium

Teddy Stadium (Hebrew: אצטדיון טדי, Itztadion Teddy) is the main football stadium in Jerusalem. The stadium is named for long-time Jerusalem mayor Teddy Kollek, who was in office during the time of its construction and was one of its prominent advocates. It opened in 1991 and has a capacity of 31,733

The stadium is home to four football clubs: Beitar Jerusalem and Hapoel Jerusalem. The stadium also serves the Israeli national team for some select home matches.

=== Pais Arena Jerusalem ===
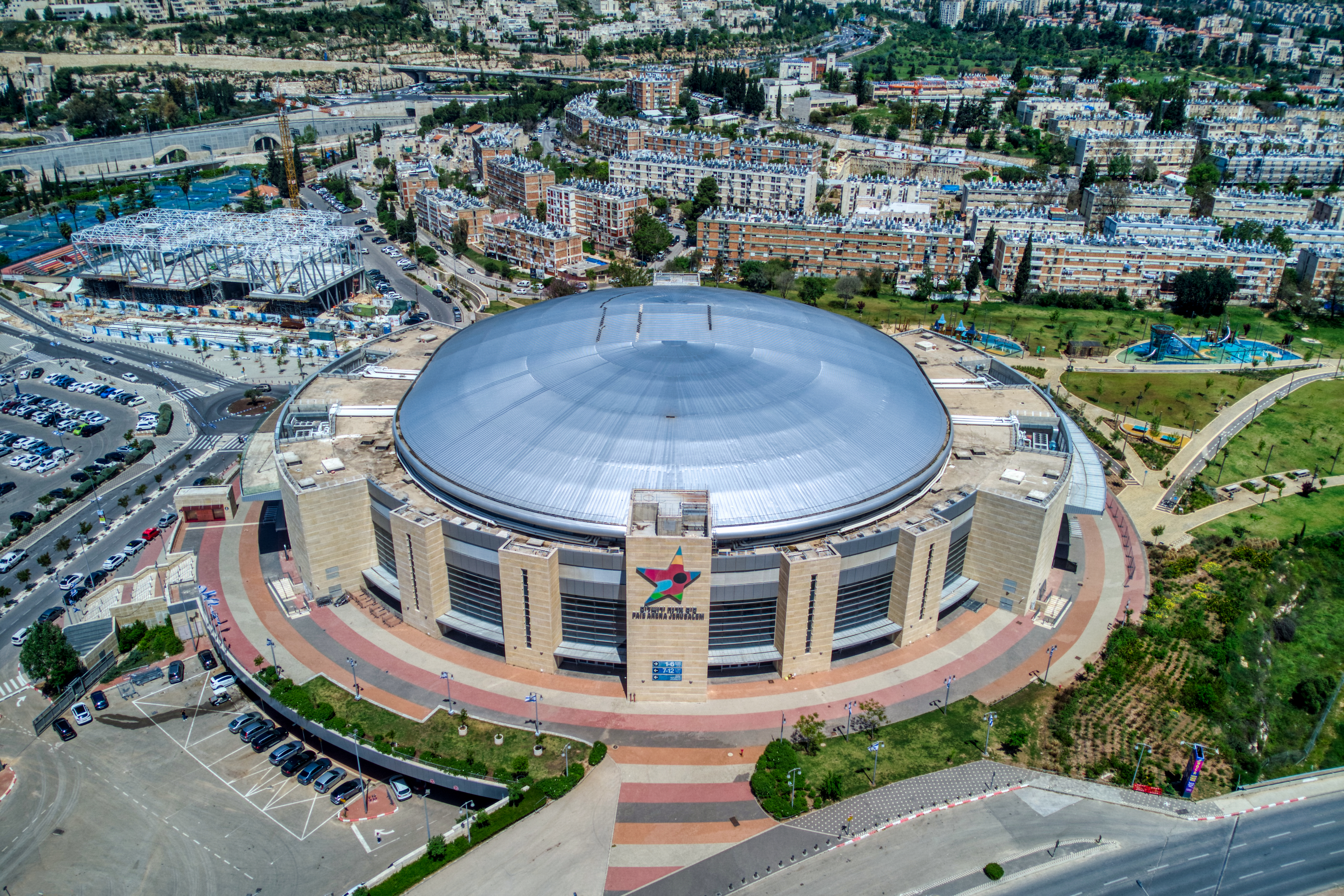
Pais Arena

The Jerusalem Arena (Hebrew: הארנה ירושלים, HaArena Yerushalayim), renamed for the National Lottery Mifal HaPais grant as Pais Arena Jerusalem (Hebrew: פיס ארנה ירושלים, HaPais Arena Yerushalayim), is a multi-purpose sports arena that was built in Jerusalem by the city council and National Lottery grant of Mifal HaPais. Opened in September 2014, the arena is located in the Jerusalem Sports Quarter, in the southwestern Malha neighborhood, adjacent to Teddy Stadium. The arena seats 11,000 for basketball games and 15,654 for concerts.

The arena is home to Hapoel Jerusalem

=== Jerusalem Tennis and Education Center ===
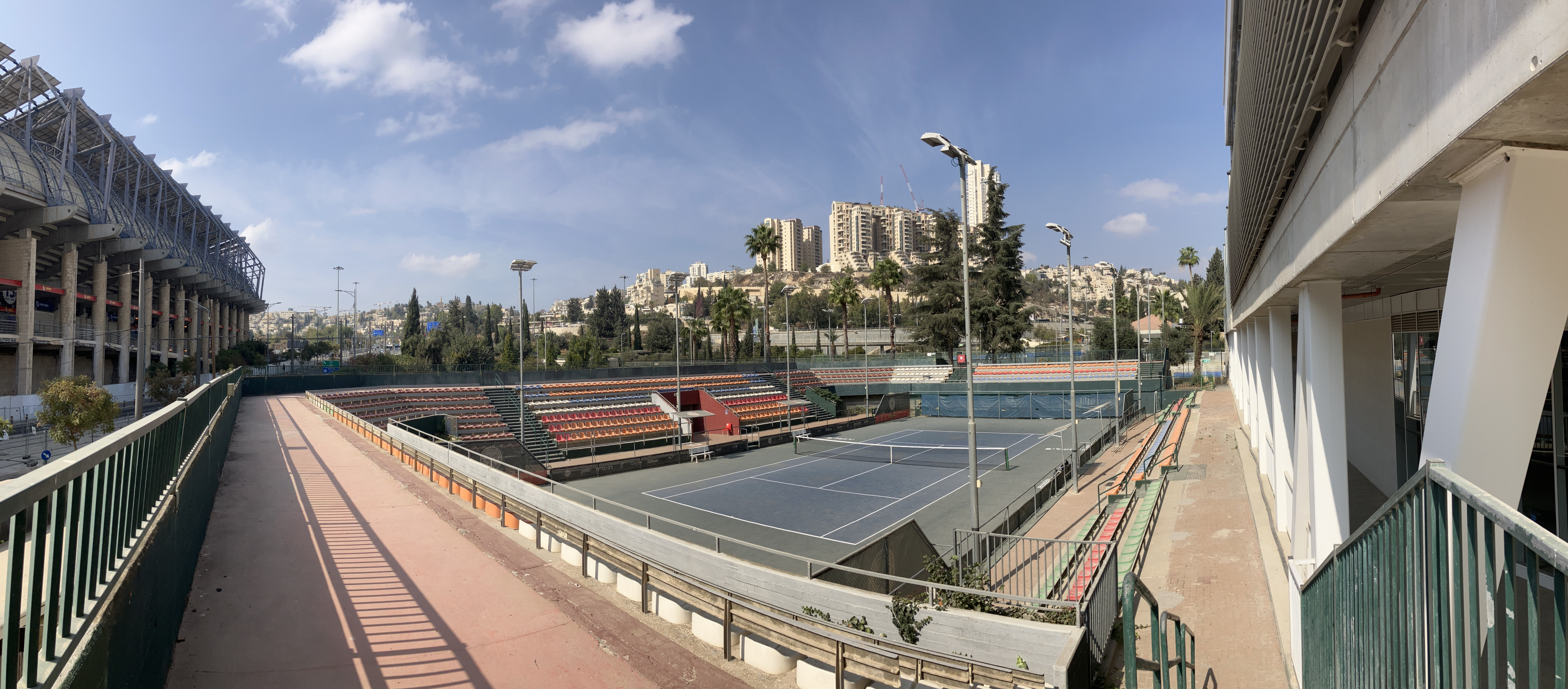
Jerusalem Tennis and Education Center

Israel Tennis Centers has its Jerusalem courts and facilities in the complex, including a main court with a capacity of 539.

=== Malha Mall ===
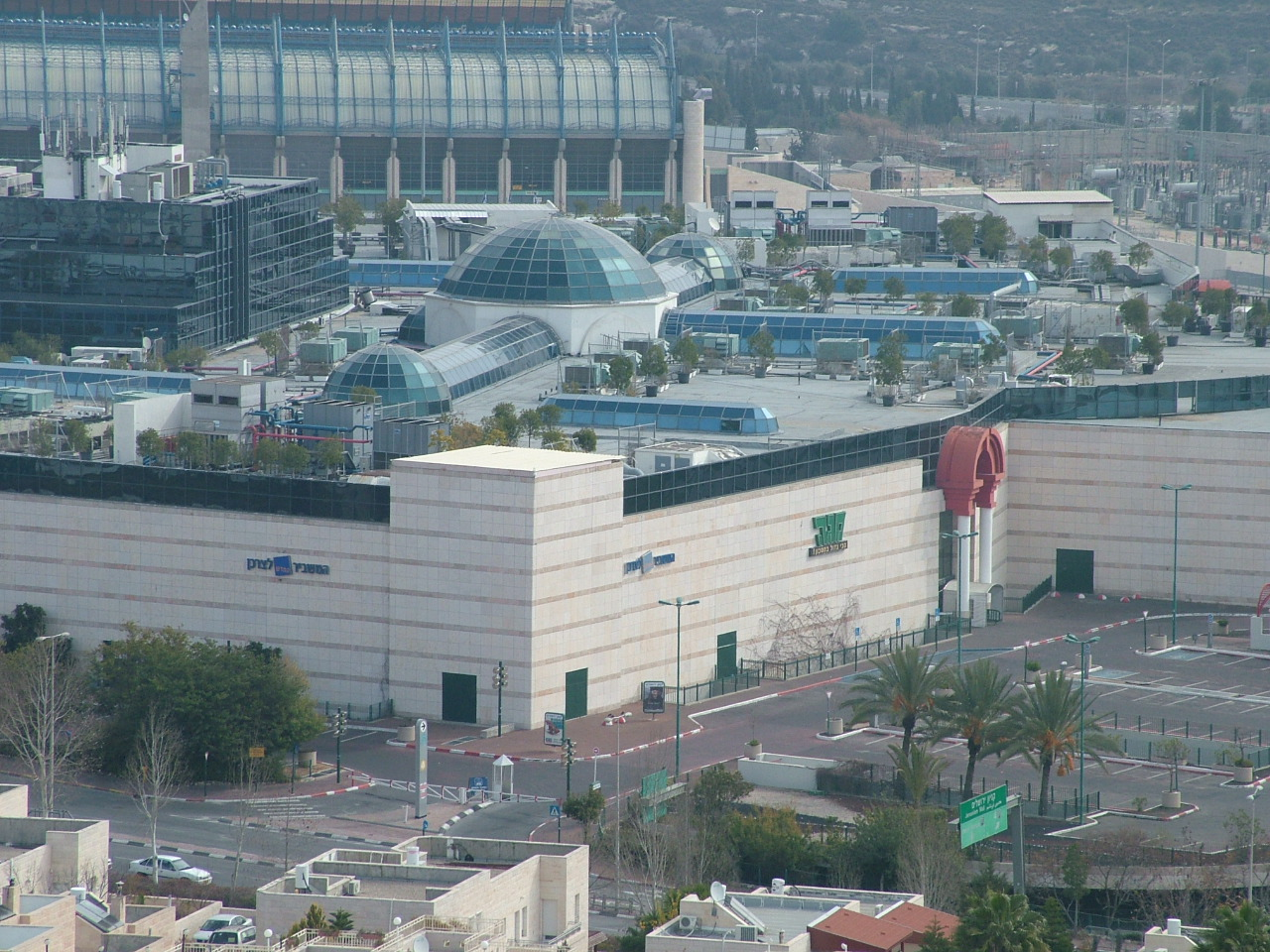
Malha Mall

The Malha Mall is a large indoor shopping mall. The mall, which opened in 1993, has 260 stores on 3 levels with a shopping area of 37,000 square metres (400,000 sq ft) and 3,000 square metres (32,000 sq ft) of office space. It is one of seven malls built in Israel by David Azrieli.

=== Other Features ===
The complex also hosts recreational neighborhood sports fields, rock climbing, boutiques, cafes, bike trails, and a school. It neighbors the Jerusalem Technology Park

== Transportation Links ==
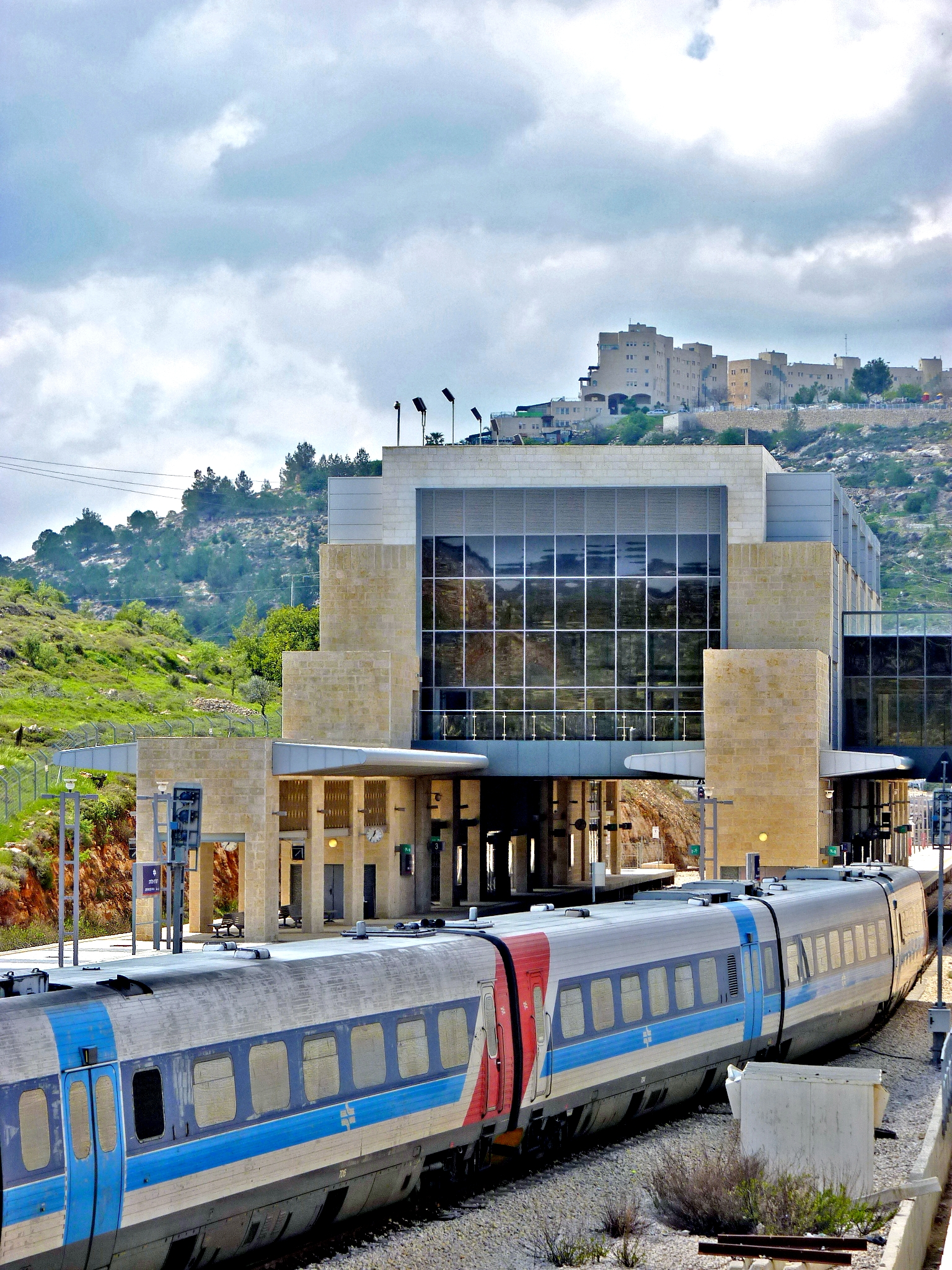
Jerusalem-Malha railway station

The complex can be reached by Israel Railways station "Jerusalem-Malha", or by Egged bus lines that stop at an onsite terminal. There are plans to extend the Jerusalem Light Rail to Malha and the sports complex.
