= Jerusalem Technology Park =

Israeli industrial research facility

Malha Technology Park
- הגן הטכנולוגי מלחה
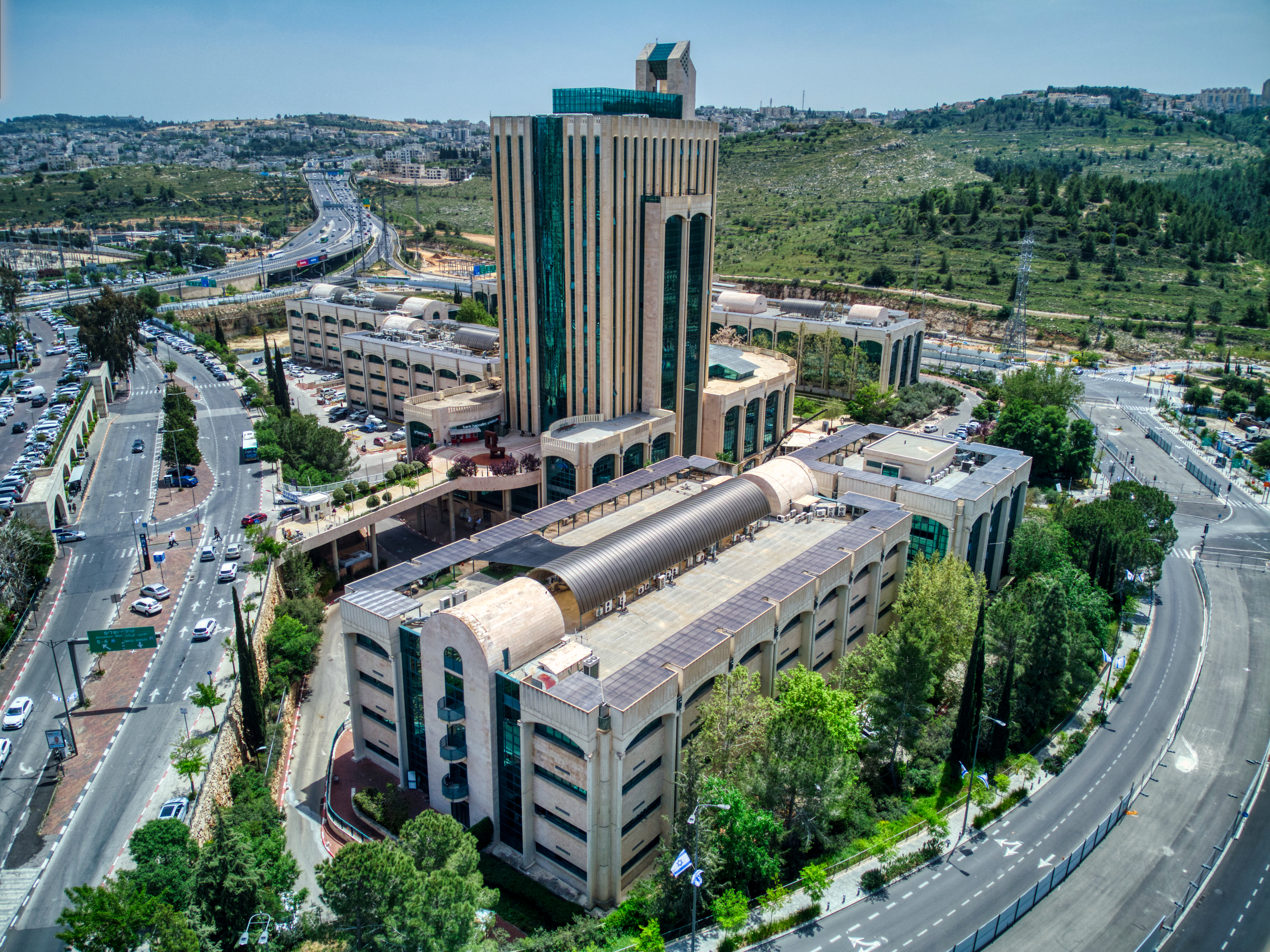

- Location within Jerusalem

General information
- Type: Technology park
- Location: Jerusalem, Israel
- Coordinates: 31°44′58″N 35°11′12″E
- Operator: Isras Group

Website
- gatiltd.co.il

Jerusalem Technology Park (Hebrew: גט"י - הגן הטכנולוגי), also Malha Technology Park (Hebrew: הגן הטכנולוגי מלחה, Hagan HaTechnologi Malha) is a high-tech industrial park located in the Malha neighborhood of southwest Jerusalem.

The Jerusalem Technology Park covers an area of about 15 acres (61,000 m^{2}) and was built gradually and populated since 1996, along with the development of the entire area, which includes: the Jerusalem Mall, Teddy Stadium, Pais Arena Jerusalem, Jerusalem Malha Railway Station, Jerusalem Tennis center, the Biblical Zoo, a residential neighborhood and a park.

The Park was designed and built as part of an urban development plan that puts an emphasis on integrating the urban fabric with the surrounding landscape, while creating a quality working environment. Within the park, in-between its buildings, there is also a Sculpture garden.

== Tenants ==
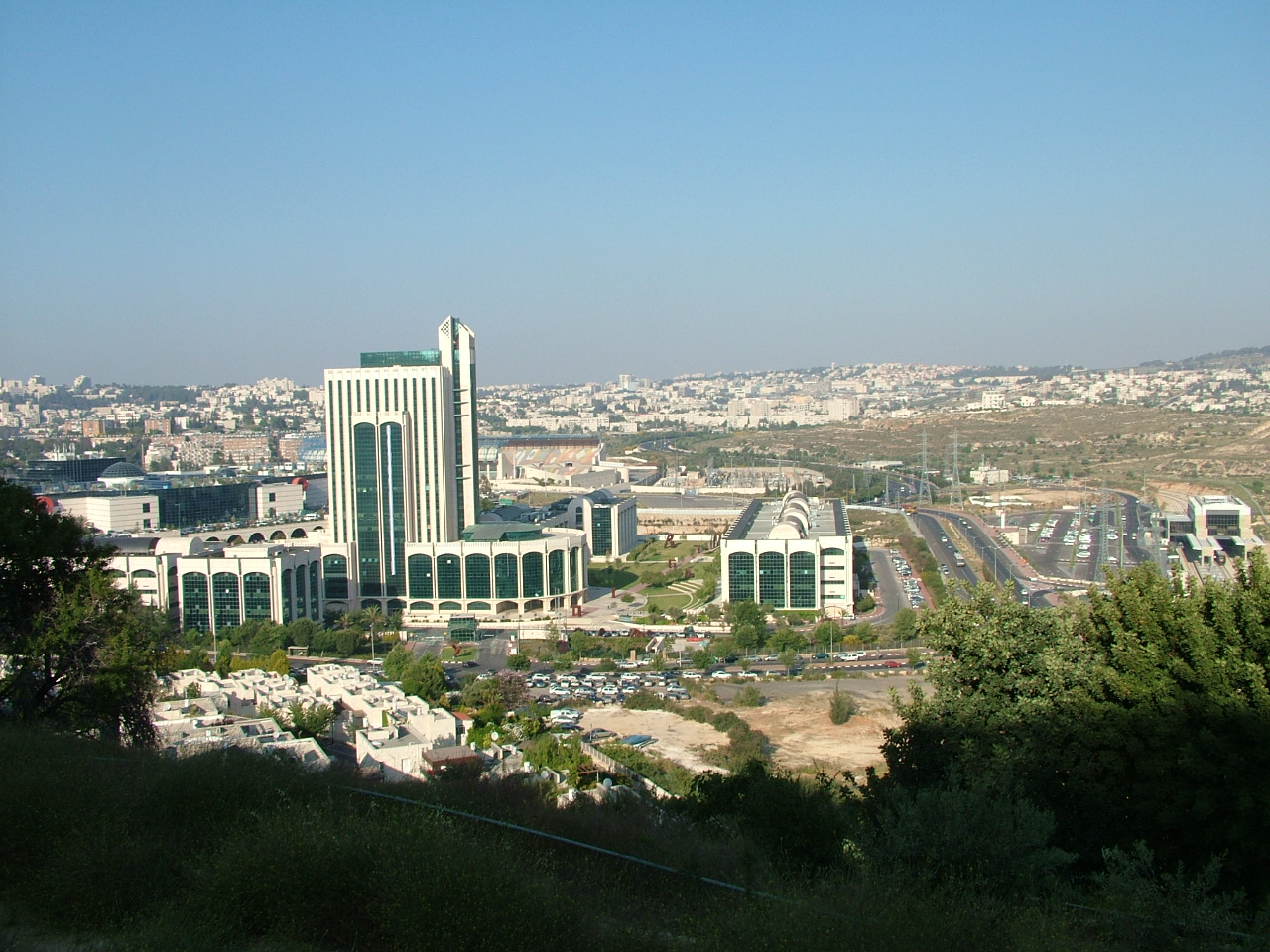
A view of the park from a nearby hill with the Jerusalem Mall (far left) and Malha Railway Station (far right)

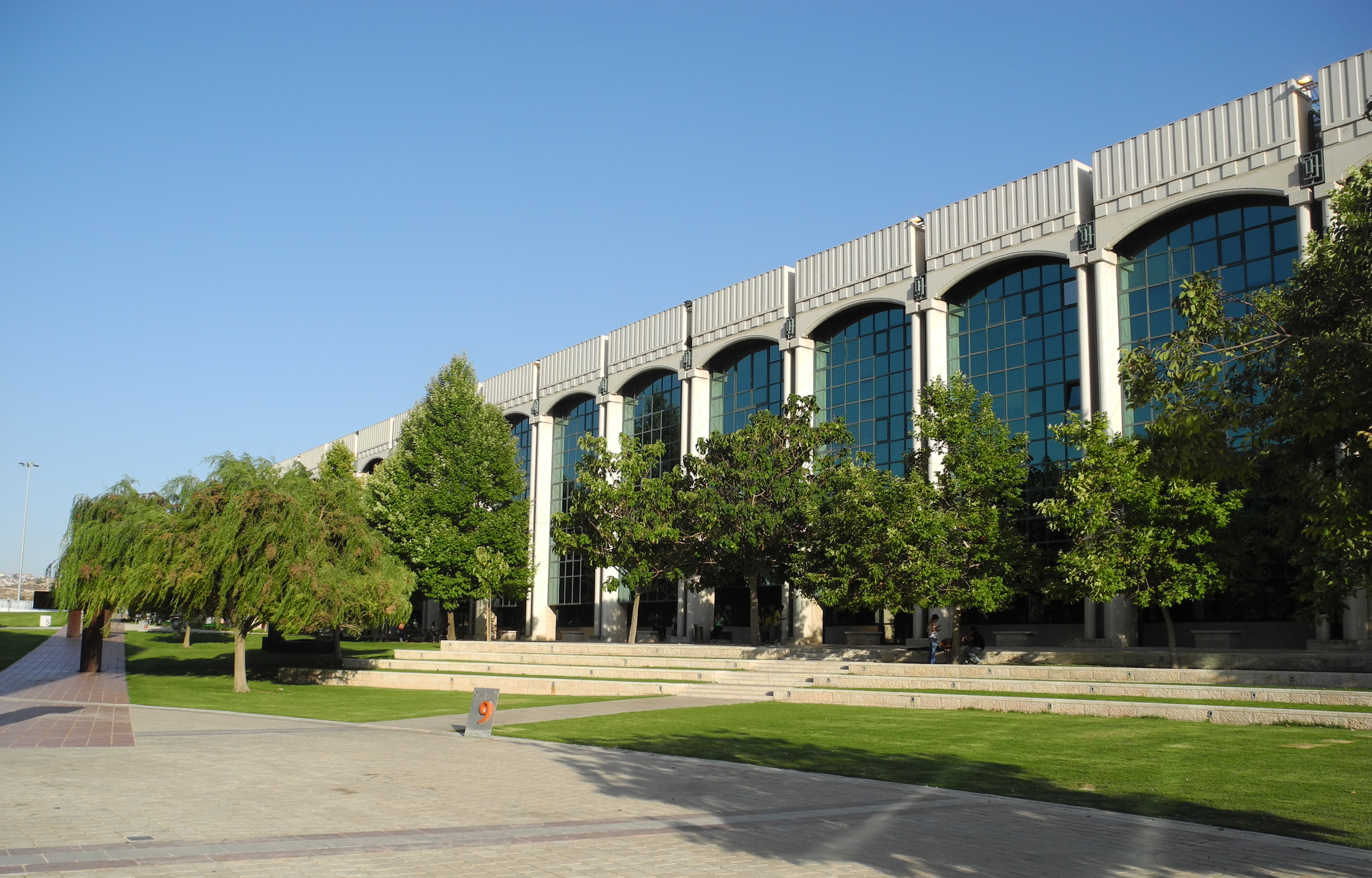
A view of the park lawn and building 9

The park is owned and managed by Isras Group, which offers office space in the park to rent only, while providing management and maintenance services. 70% of the tenants are Hi-tech sector companies and 30% are from the business services and media sectors. Notable tenants include:

- IBM R&D Labs in Israel
- Ex Libris Group
- Israel Innovation Authority
- Freightos
- Visionix
- Nanonics Imaging
- Pepticom
- Embassy of the Republic of Guatemala
- Embassy of the Republic of Paraguay

== See also ==
- Har Hotzvim Technology Park
- Science and technology in Israel
- Silicon Wadi
