= Tadd =

Tadd is a given name. Notable people with the name include:

- Tadd Dameron (1917–1965), American jazz composer, arranger, and pianist
- Tadd Fujikawa (born 1991), American golfer
- Tadd Roosevelt (1879–1958), American heir and automobile worker

== See also ==
- Tad (given name)
- Tedd (given name)
