= Ted =

Ted may refer to:

== Names and people ==
- Ted (given name)

A shortened form of the following:

- Edmund
- Edward
- Thaddeus
- Theodore (given name)

== Art, entertainment, and media ==
=== Films ===
- Ted (film), a 2012 American comedy directed by Seth MacFarlane and starring MacFarlane alongside Mark Wahlberg and Mila Kunis
  - Ted 2, the 2015 sequel to the 2012 film, directed by MacFarlane and starring MacFarlane, Wahlberg and Amanda Seyfried

=== Music ===
- Ted (album), by Swede Ted Gärdestad
- "Ted", from the 1980 album Virgin Ground by Redgum
- "Ted", from the 2006 album Body Riddle by electronic

=== Television ===
- "Ted" (Buffy the Vampire Slayer episode)
- Ted (TV series), a prequel spinoff of the Seth MacFarlane film series
- Ted (dog), known for appearances on Mortimer & Whitehouse: Gone Fishing

=== Other media ===
- Ted, a 2009 novel by Tony DiTerlizzi

== Other uses ==
- Ted (airline), United Airlines brand
- Ted (word processor)

== See also ==
- TED (disambiguation)
- Tedd (given name)
- Teddy (disambiguation)
- Teddy Boy, a youth sub-culture of the 1950s
- Tedi (disambiguation)
- Teds (disambiguation)
