= Tedd =

Tedd may refer to:

- Tedd (given name)
- Tedd, County Fermanagh, a townland in County Fermanagh, Northern Ireland
