= Teds =

Teds or TEDS may refer to

- Transducer Electronic Data Sheet
- Teddy Boys, particularly 1970s revivalists.
- Trinity Evangelical Divinity School
- The Ellen DeGeneres Show
- Twins Early Development Study
- The Ethical Debating Society
- TETRA Enhanced Data Service
- Tactical Eye Devices, a US Army term for eyeglasses
- Thrombo Embolus Deterrent Stockings- Anti-Embolism Compression Stockings

== See also ==
- Ted (disambiguation)
- TED (disambiguation)
- Ted's Hot Dogs
