= Teddy bear (disambiguation) =

A teddy bear is a stuffed toy.

Teddy bear may also refer to:

== Music ==
=== Bands ===
- The Teddy Bears, Phil Spector's first band
- Teddybears (band), a band from Stockholm, Sweden

=== Album ===
- Teddy Bear (single album), 2023 STAYC album

=== Songs ===
- "(Let Me Be Your) Teddy Bear", 1957 number one hit for Elvis Presley
- "Teddy Bear" (Red Sovine song), 1976
- Teddy Bear (STAYC song), 2023
- "Teddy Bear", a song from the album Duty by Ayumi Hamasaki
- "Teddybear", a 1997 song by Toy-Box
- "Teddy Bear", a song by Cheryl from A Million Lights (2012)
- "Teddy Bear", song by Amit Trivedi, Anand Bhaskar and Nikhita Gandhi from the 2024 Indian film CTRL
- "Teddy Bear", by Melanie Martinez from the digital deluxe edition of the album Cry Baby and the EP Cry Baby's Extra Clutter

== Film and television ==
- The 'Teddy' Bears, a 1907 film
- Teddy Bear (1981 film), English title of the 1981 Polish film Miś
- Teddy Bear (2007 film), a 2007 Czech comedy film directed by Jan Hřebejk
- Teddy Bear (2012 film), English title of the 2012 Danish film 10 Timer til Paradis
- Teddybears (TV series), a British children's television programme

== Other uses ==
- Teddy Bear, South Dakota, a ghost town in Pennington County, South Dakota, United States
- IDF Caterpillar D9, an Israeli armored bulldozer nicknamed "Doobi" ("teddy bear")
- Teddy bear, a variety of golden hamster
- Zuchon or teddy bear, a hybrid breed dog
- Cylindropuntia bigelovii, a species of cactus sometimes referred to as the teddy-bear cactus or teddy-bear cholla

== See also ==
- Teddy (disambiguation)
