= Sports complex =

Group of sports facilities

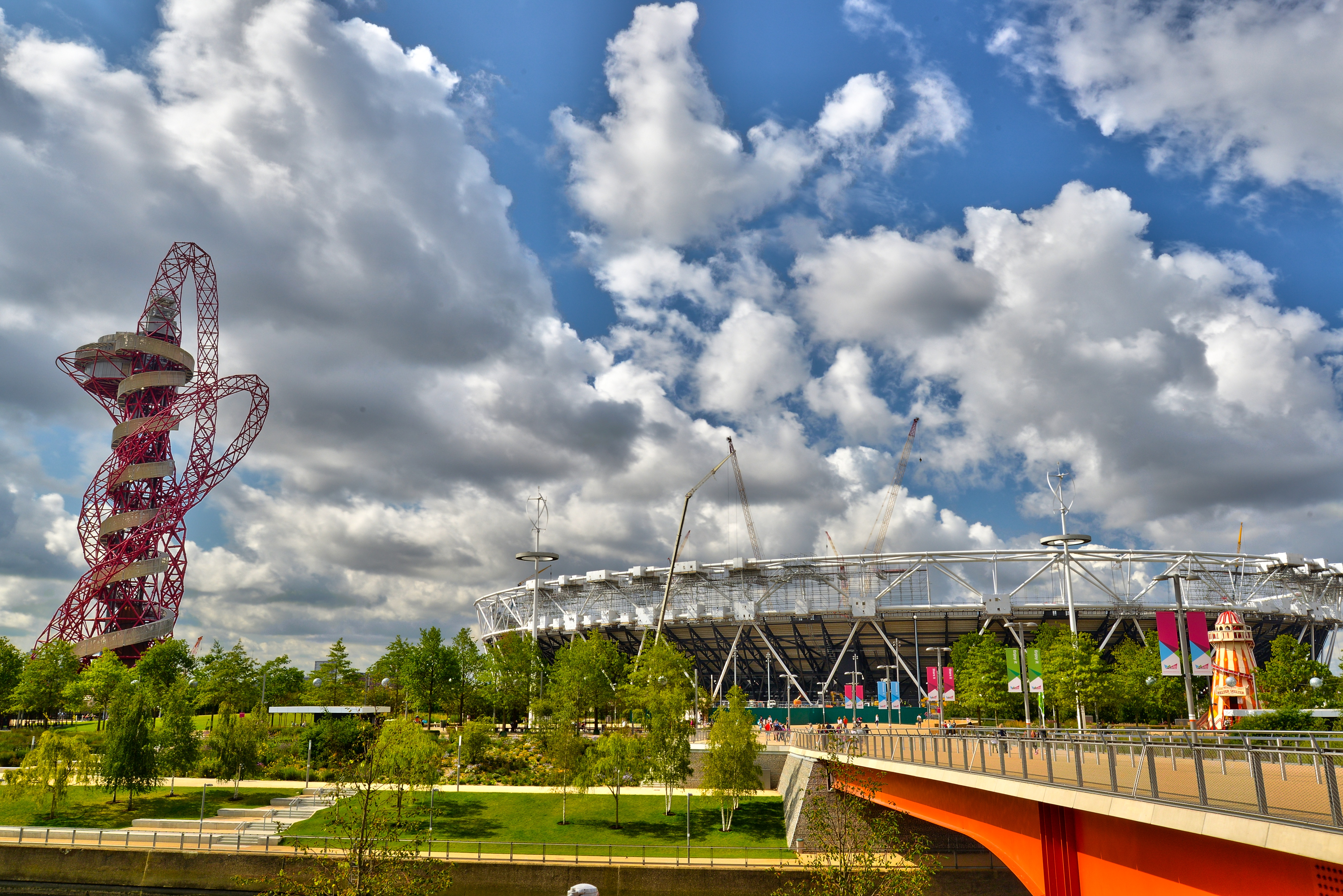
The Arcelormittal Orbit

A sports complex is a group of sports facilities. For example, there are track and field stadiums, football stadiums, baseball stadiums, swimming pools, Olympic Parks, and indoor arenas.

== Asia ==
- Arjuna Bhogeswar Baruah Sports Complex
- Azadi Sport Complex
- Cebu City Sports Complex
- Dasana Indah Sport City
- Davao City–UP Sports Complex
- Davao del Norte Sports Complex
- Deli Sport City
- Doyo Baru Sport Complex
- Gelora Bung Karno Sports Complex
- Gelora Bung Tomo Sports Complex
- Rizal Memorial Sports Complex
- Pakistan Sports Complex
- Jerusalem Sports Quarter
- Jakabaring Sport City
- Jalak Harupat Sports Complex
- JRD Tata Sports Complex
- Kai Tak Sports Park
- Kalinga Stadium
- Lukas Enembe Sport Complex
- Malaysia National Sports Complex
- Marikina Sports Center
- Mimika Sport Complex
- Nanjing Olympic Sports Center
- New Clark City Sports Complex
- Olympic Green
- Panaad Park and Sports Complex
- Rawamangun Sports Complex
- Shree Shiv Chhatrapati Sports Complex
- Setia SPICE
- Seoul Sports Complex
- Siliwangi Sport Complex
- Singapore Sports Hub
- The Sports Hub Trivandrum

== Europe ==
- Anella Olímpica
- Athens Olympic Sports Complex
- Faliro Coastal Zone Olympic Complex
- First Direct Arena
- Foro Italico
- Goudi Olympic Complex
- Headingley Stadium
- Hellinikon Olympic Complex
- Horsfall Stadium
- Manchester Regional Arena
- Odsal Stadium
- Olympiapark Berlin
- Park Avenue (stadium)
- Prioritet Serneke Arena
- Queen Elizabeth Olympic Park
- Torino Olympic Park

== North America ==
- Camden Yards Sports Complex
- Chelsea Piers Sports & Entertainment Complex
- ESPN Wide World of Sports Complex
- Gateway Sports and Entertainment Complex
- Meadowlands Sports Complex
- Olympic Park, Montreal
- South Philadelphia Sports Complex
- Truman Sports Complex
- Whistler Olympic Park

== Oceania ==
- Ballarat Sports Events Centre
- Canberra International Sports & Aquatic Centre
- Marden Sports Complex
- Marrara Sporting Complex
- Maroochydore Multi Sports Complex
- Melbourne Sports and Entertainment Precinct
- Moreton Bay Central Sports Complex
- Murray Sporting Complex
- Piggabeen Sports Complex
- Queensland Sport and Athletics Centre
- Springvale Indoor Sports Centre
- South Pine Sports Complex
- Sydney Olympic Park
- Willows Sports Complex

== South America ==
- Atanasio Girardot Sports Complex
- Barra Olympic Park
- Deodoro Olympic Park

== See also ==
- Sports venue
- Multi-purpose stadium
