= TED =

TED may refer to:

== Education ==
- Turkish Education Association (Türk Eğitim Derneği)
  - TED Ankara College Foundation Schools, Turkey
- Transvaal Education Department, South Africa; for example see Pretoria High School for Girls

== Entertainment and media ==
- TED (conference) (Technology, Entertainment, and Design)
- Tenders Electronic Daily, a journal on government procurement in the European Union

== Science and technology ==
- MOS Technology TED, an integrated circuit
- TED Notepad, a freeware portable plain-text editor
- Television Electronic Disc, an early Telefunken video disc
- Thyroid eye disease, aka Graves' ophthalmopathy
- Transferred electron device or Gunn diode
- TransLattice Elastic Database, a NewSQL database by TransLattice

== Other uses ==
- TED spread, between US Treasuries and Eurodollar
- Teddington railway station (National Rail station code), London, UK
- Tooheys Extra Dry, Australian beer
- Turtle excluder device, for letting sea turtles escape from fishing-nets

== See also ==
- Ted (disambiguation)
- Teds (disambiguation)
- Tender notification
