= Tedi =

Tedi may refer to:

== Acronyms ==
- Trans-European Drug Information (TEDI)
- The Economist Democracy Index

== People ==
- Tedi Thurman, American model and actress (d. 2012)
- Tedi Sarafian, American screenwriter
- Tedi Cara, Albanian professional football player
- Tedi Moskov, Bulgarian film director

== Other uses ==
- TEDi (retailer), a German variety store chain
- Tedi Medi Family, an Indian sitcom television series

== See also ==
- Ted (disambiguation)
- Teddy (disambiguation)
