= Teddy (cigarette) =

Norwegian brand of cigarettes

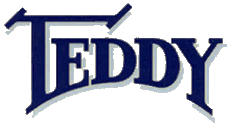

- Product type: Cigarette
- Current owner: British American Tobacco
- Country: Norway
- Introduced: 1914
- Discontinued: 2010; 16 years ago
- Markets: Norway
- Previous owners: Dr. J. L. Tiedemanns Tobaksfabrik

Teddy was a Norwegian brand of cigarettes, owned by the multinational company British American Tobacco. Cigarettes were manufactured by the Norwegian subsidiary of BAT (formerly "Dr. J. L. Tiedemanns Tobaksfabrik").

== History ==
Around 1905, after the establishment of the British-American Tobacco Co., (Norway) Ltd. in Oslo, there was an ongoing tobacco 'war.' The conflict was between the American tobacco trust (led by American Tobacco Company's James 'Buck' Duke) and the Norwegian manufacturers. In the United States president Theodore 'Teddy' Roosevelt was fighting the American trust/enterprise, and he was seen as an ally by the Norwegian manufacturers. In 1914 J. L. Tiedemanns Tobaksfabrik honored Roosevelt by launching a cigarette brand named Teddy. The trust war in Norway ended in November/December 1930 when BAT (Norway) was split between BATCO (45%), Tiedemann (45%), DnC (5%) - a bank, Andresens Bank (5%) - a bank owned by the Andresen family, the real owners of J. L. Tiedemanns Tobaksfabrik, when A/S Norsk-Engelsk Tobakkfabrikk (NETO) was established. In November 1933 NETO was completely in the hands of J. L. Tiedemanns.

In a commercial shown on early Norwegian TV, Teddy was presented as a cigarette for sportsmen and physically active Norwegians.

The brand was introduced in 1914 and the cigarettes use a Virginia tobacco. The brand was discontinued in 2010.

== See also ==
- Tobacco smoking
