= The Environmental Determinants of Diabetes in the Young =

Medical study of type 1 diabetes

The Environmental Determinants of Diabetes in the Young is a longitudinal study examining the environmental causes of Type 1 diabetes (T1D), formerly known as juvenile diabetes. The study follows children at high genetic risk for T1D from birth to 15 years of age.

Although genetic markers for Type 1 Diabetes have been identified, genetic predisposition is not the only factor in development of the disease. An increasing body of evidence, including rising rates of T1D diagnosis and incomplete penetrance of the disease in genetically predisposed individuals, suggests that environment may play an equally important role. TEDDY researchers hypothesize that a range of environmental factors have the ability to influence both the initial development of pancreatic beta-cell autoimmunity and the ultimate progression from autoimmunity to diabetes.

TEDDY monitors participants for the presence of antibodies to insulin, GAD, IA2, and ZnT8 through regular testing. Study participants also provide a range of samples designed to give a comprehensive view of their exposure to environmental factors which could possibly trigger or protect against the development of autoimmunity and T1D. Samples collected for analysis include blood, nasal swabs, saliva, urine, stool, toenails, and drinking water. Additionally, researchers collect diet records and interview subjects and their caretakers to assess the subjects’ stress levels, determine the impact of major life changes, and identify additional environmental factors such as illnesses, immunizations, allergies, and pets.

TEDDY is funded by the National Institute of Diabetes and Digestive and Kidney Diseases (NIDDK), National Institute of Allergy and Infectious Diseases (NIAID), National Institute of Child Health and Human Development (NICHD), National Institute of Environmental Health Sciences (NIEHS), Juvenile Diabetes Research Foundation (JDRF), and the Centers for Disease Control and Prevention.

== History of the TEDDY Study ==
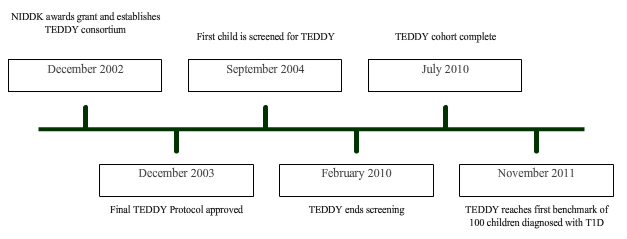
Timeline of Key Events in the History of the TEDDY Study.

=== Establishment of the TEDDY Consortium ===
In 2002, the TEDDY consortium was created. This consortium is made up of six clinical centers, three based in the United States (located in Colorado, Georgia, and Washington State) and three in Europe (in Germany, Sweden, and Finland).

A single Data Coordinating Center is also included in the TEDDY consortium. The DCC, located in Florida, is responsible for the comparison and synthesis of information from each of the clinical centers.

=== Subject Recruitment ===
Recruitment for the TEDDY study began in 2004 and was completed in 2010. Potential TEDDY subjects were identified at birth by genetic screening of the HLA-DR/DQ loci, which are considered to be highly important in determining whether an individual will develop Type 1 Diabetes. Parents of newborns with HLA DR/DQ genotypes associated with a high risk for T1D were approached for enrollment in the study.

TEDDY researchers screened a total of 421,047 newborns, with 26,239 eligible for the study. Slightly over 22% of newborns with a first degree relative with T1D were eligible for enrollment in the study. Only about 5% of newborns from the general population (no first degree relative with T1D) were eligible.

=== Major Findings ===
Several publications have suggested a link between participation in the TEDDY study and fewer complications at T1D diagnosis. In 2011, one report found that children in TEDDY are less likely to experience diabetic ketoacidosis (DKA) at the time of diagnosis. DKA is a serious complication which is particularly common in children under five years of age and can lead to cerebral edema, coma, and death.

A 2013 publication also stated that children who develop T1D while enrolled in TEDDY are diagnosed sooner after the onset of the disease than those not in the study. Among children who are not enrolled in a research study, 99% are symptomatic at the time of T1D diagnosis. However, of the 100 children in TEDDY who had been diagnosed with T1D at the time of publication, only 64% were symptomatic. Researchers believe that this difference can be attributed to the close monitoring of TEDDY subjects through methods such as regular autoantibody testing and oral glucose tolerance tests. Earlier diagnosis of T1D is associated with fewer long-term complications and better preservation of function in remaining pancreatic β-cells.
