= Teddy Stadium =

Sports stadium in Jerusalem, Israel

Coordinates: 31°45′4.20″N 35°11′26.22″E

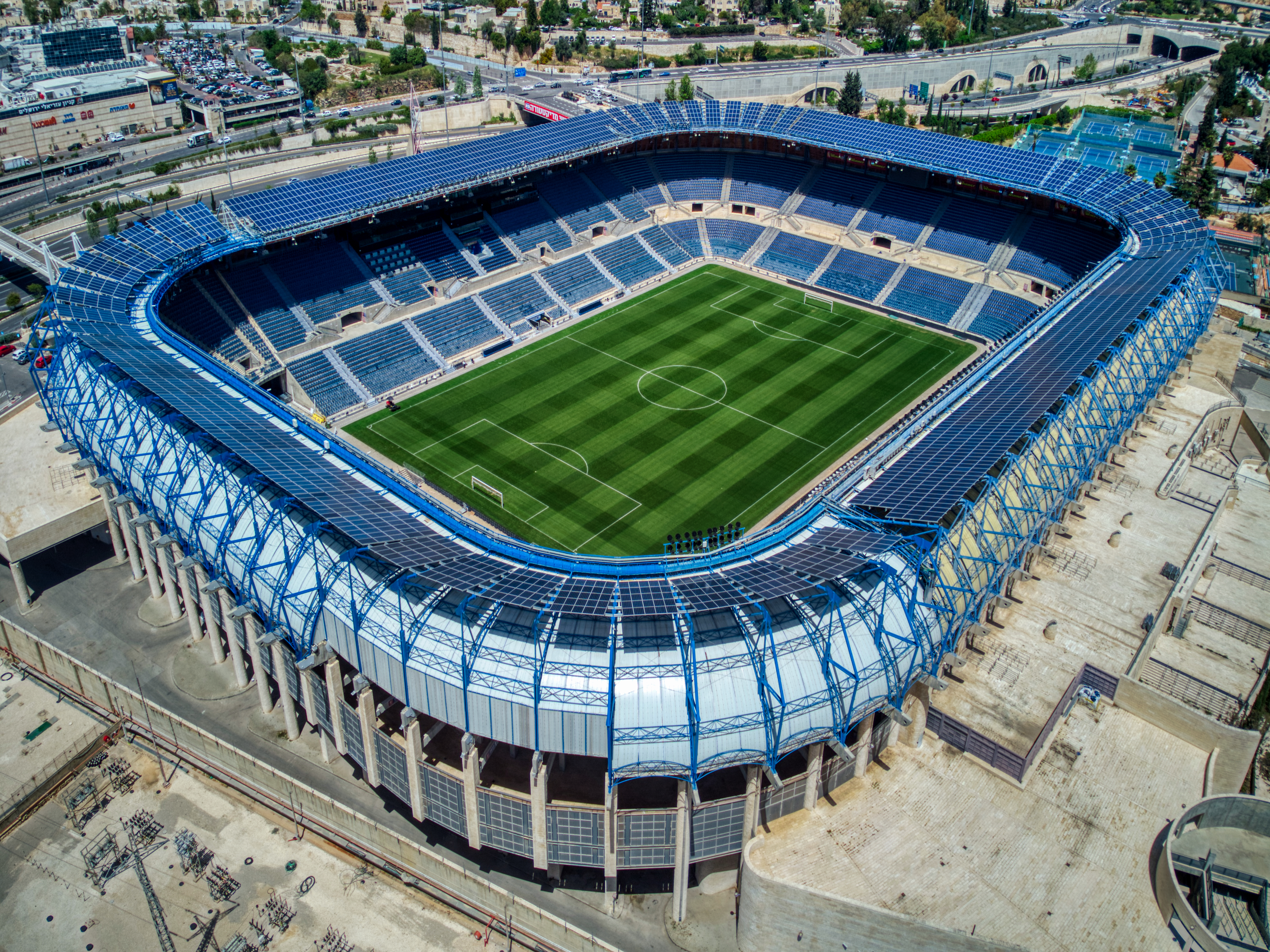
- UEFA
- Interactive map of Teddy Stadium
- Location: Jerusalem, Israel
- Owner: Jerusalem Municipality
- Operator: Ariel Municipal Company Ltd.
- Capacity: 31,733
- Surface: Grass
- Scoreboard: LED
- Field size: 105 m × 68 m (344 ft × 223 ft)
- Public transit: at Malha Sports Complex

Construction
- Groundbreaking: 1990
- Opened: 1991
- Renovated: 1997–1998, 2011–2013, 2018–2020
- Cost: $ 60 million
- Architects: Yossi Ben Naim; Pascual Broid

Tenants
- Beitar Jerusalem (1991–present); Hapoel Jerusalem (1991–present); Israel national football team (selected matches): Major sporting events hosted; 2013 UEFA European Under-21 Championship

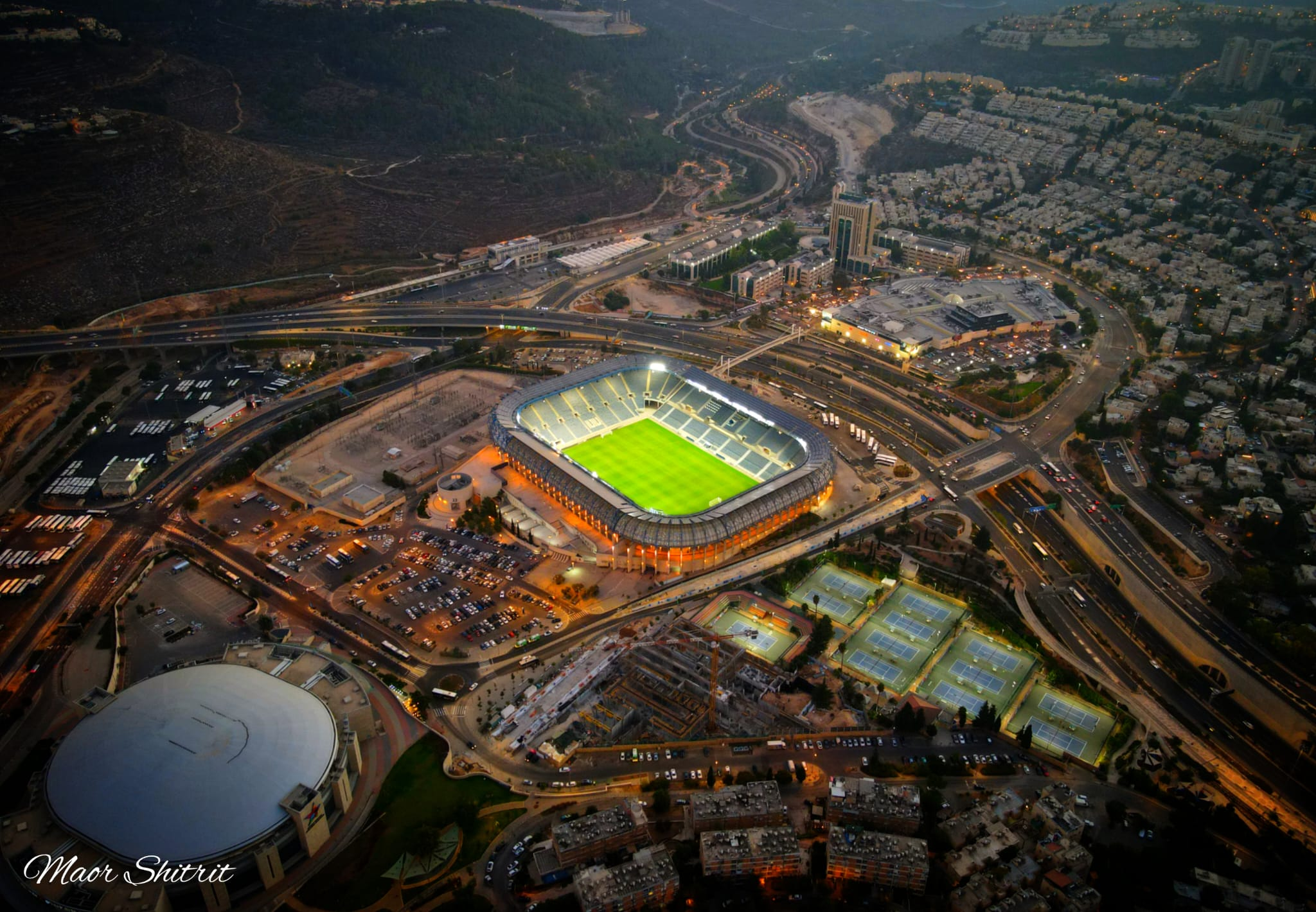
The Teddy Stadium from above in 2023

Teddy Stadium (Hebrew: אצטדיון טדי) is a sports stadium in Jerusalem, Israel. Two major Israeli football clubs currently use it as their home ground: Beitar Jerusalem and Hapoel Jerusalem. The Israel national football team also uses it for select home matches.

The stadium is named after long-time Mayor of Jerusalem Teddy Kollek, who was in office during the time of its initial construction and was one of its prominent advocates.

== History ==
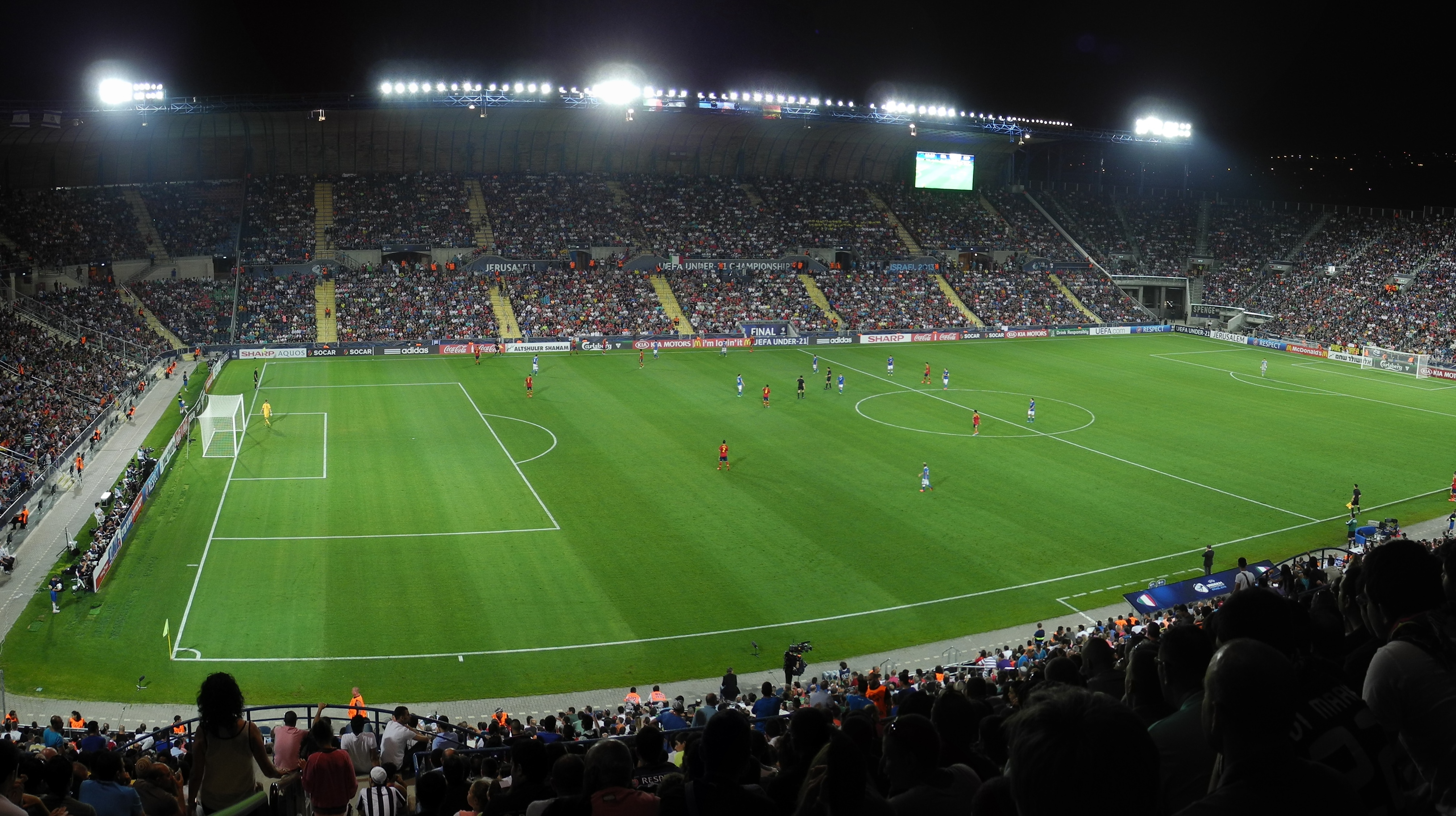
Teddy Stadium of Jerusalem, the largest stadium of the Israel national football team. It also has hosted the 2013 UEFA European Under-21 Championship.

The stadium was built in 1990–91 as part of a wider redevelopment project by the Jerusalem Municipality focused on the suburb of Malha, originally a poor area populated by immigrant families, who had repopulated the village in the 1950s after its Palestinian Arab population was displaced in 1948, but later become extensively gentrified. The history of the location, the historical village of Maliha (Hebraized as Manakhat which later reverted to Malha), has brought controversy, and the stadium is referred to by Arab-Israelis as "Maliha stadium". The redevelopment of the wider area subsequently included the Malha Mall (built 1993) and the Jerusalem Technology Park (built 1996).

For Beitar, the stadium was a major upgrade after years of playing at the YMCA Stadium, nicknamed "The Sandbox". In the first stage, only the west and east sides of the stadium were built, giving it a capacity of 14,500. In 1999, work was finished on a north side which contains capacity of 8000 seats.

The stadium itself is one of the newest in Israel and one of the few that are close to meeting all European standards. It is accessible to the disabled, has modern bathrooms, and has ample concession stands, a combination that is very difficult to find in many Israeli stadiums. The stadium has 5,000 parking spots on its premises, and is connected to the Malha Mall and its parking facilities by a pedestrian bridge.

The stadium is located at the Begin Expressway and just past the Malha Train Station, which ensures convenient road and rail access to the rest of Israel.

With stands close to the pitch and excellent acoustics, Teddy Stadium has hosted several Israel national football team matches, the Maccabiah Games opening ceremony, and other public events.

A south side stand was completed on 3 June 2013, increasing seating capacity to 31,733.

Teddy Stadium was one of the venues for the 2013 UEFA European Under-21 Football Championship and hosted the tournament's final match.

The first official match of the Israel national football team in the new stadium was played on 31 March 2015. Israel hosted the Belgium national football team in the UEFA Euro 2016 qualifying match and lost the match by a score of 0–1.

Israel was chosen to host The 2021 IFAF Flag Football World Championship which were played at Teddy Stadium after feared high winds at the original venue, The Kraft Family Sports Campus in Jerusalem.

== Supporters ==
During Beitar matches, the La Familia group occupies the eastern sections of the stadium. The "Eastern Stand" (Hebrew: היציע המזרחי) is the home not only of La Familia group but the fans of Beitar, with different tifo displays, flags and banners on a regular basis.

== Renovations ==
In September 2016 a new solar system which can produce 639 kW was installed on the roof of the stadium.

In mid-2018 Jerusalem municipality announced a 25 million ₪ upgrade of the stadium which have finished at the start of 2019:

- The players warm-up hall was renovated.
- New ergonomic players seats were installed.
- New professional sound system was installed on the roof.

The second phase of the renovation began in February 2019, and was completed in August 2020:

- Completion of the new roof for the south stand.
- Extension of the solar system on the new south stand roof.
- Installation of a new external LED lights show system around the stadium.
- Built new 8 VIP boxes in the west stand.

The third phase of the renovation began in 2021, and these are the things which have been completed so far until the end of 2022/23 season:

- Replacement of 6700 remaining old seats in the north stand with new modern seats.
- Extension of the new sound system on the south stand roof.
- Replacement of the old stadium lighting with new dynamic LED lights system.
- Replacement of the old screens by installing two new LED screens on the roofs of the north and south stands.

Jerusalem municipality allocated dozen of millions ₪ more for further improvements towards 2025/26 season:

- Completed the constructions of a new VIP complex within the west stand.
- Completed the renovation of the dressing rooms and players tunnel.
- Ongoing constructions of new shops and restaurants outside the north stand.

== International matches ==
Date		Result		Competition	Attendance
12 February 1992	Israel	1–2	CIS	Friendly	2,000
29 November 1994	Israel	4–3	Cyprus	Friendly	4,000
20 September 1995	Israel	3–1	Uruguay	Friendly	8,000
22 January 1997	Israel	1–1	Greece	Friendly	500
15 April 1998	Israel	2–1	Argentina	Friendly	14,000
24 February 1999	Israel	2–0	Latvia	Friendly	6,000
9 February 2003	Israel	3–3	Croatia	Friendly	4,000
14 November 2012	Israel	1–2	Belarus	Friendly	8,000
31 March 2015	Israel	0–1	Belgium	UEFA Euro 2016 qualifying	29,750
13 October 2015	Israel	1–2	Cyprus	UEFA Euro 2016 qualifying	25,300
9 October 2016	Israel	2–1	Liechtenstein	2018 FIFA World Cup qualification	9,000
9 October 2017	Israel	0–1	Spain	2018 FIFA World Cup qualification	28,700
16 November 2019	Israel	1–2	Poland	UEFA Euro 2020 qualifying	16,700
19 June 2023	Israel	2–1	Andorra	UEFA Euro 2024 qualifying	13,300

== See also ==
- Lists of stadiums
- List of football stadiums in Israel
- Sports in Israel
- Pais Arena Jerusalem
- Jerusalem Sports Quarter
