= Pais Arena =

Arena in Jerusalem

Coordinates: 31°45′4.05″N 35°11′38.92″E

Pais Arena Jerusalem
- פיס ארנה ירושלים
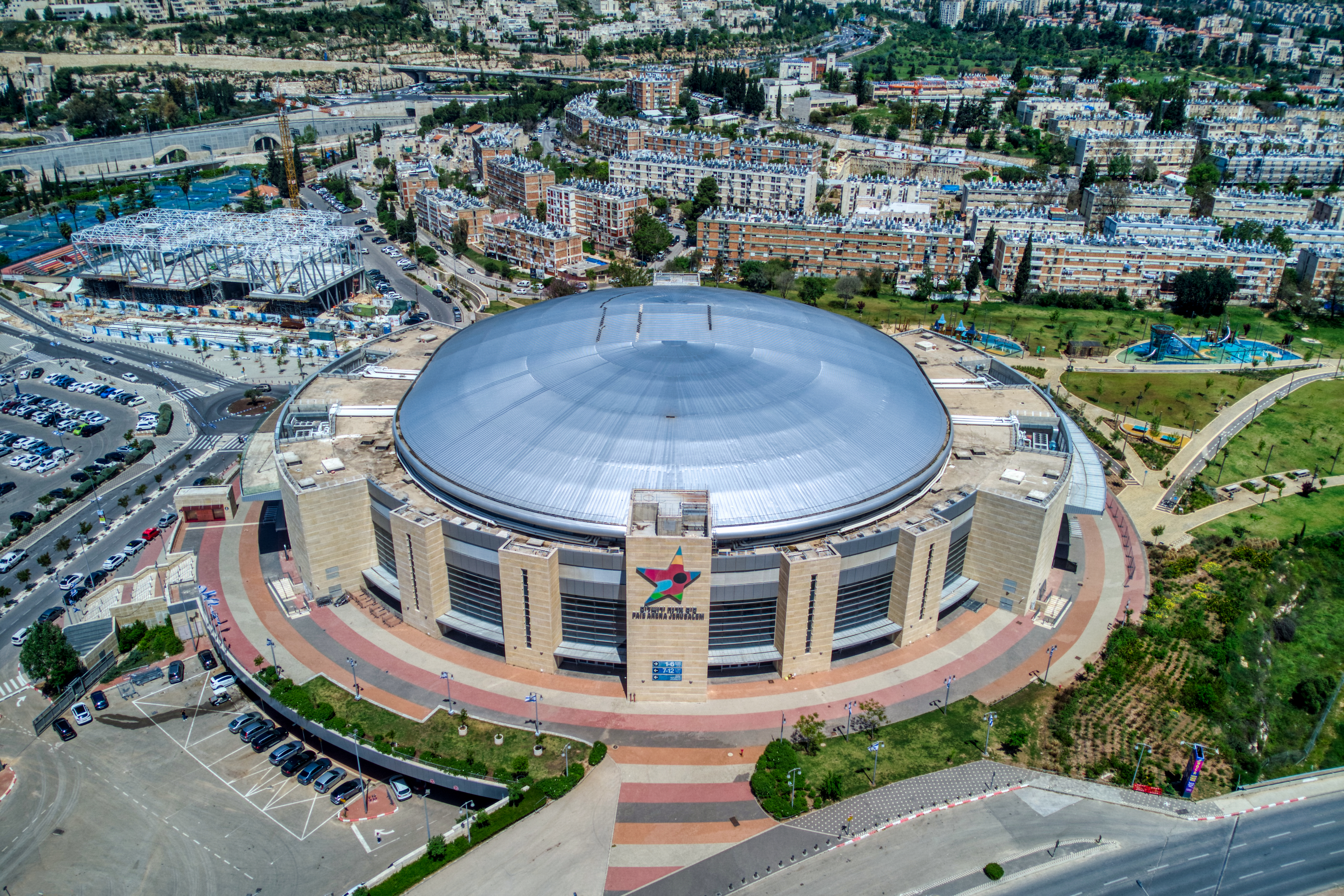
- Jerusalem Arena
- Interactive map of Pais Arena Jerusalem
- Location: Jerusalem, Israel
- Owner: Jerusalem Municipality
- Operator: Ariel Municipal Company Ltd.
- Capacity: 11,000
- Surface: Parquet; Ice
- Field size: 441,300 square feet (41,000 m^{2})
- Public transit: at Malha Sports Complex

Construction
- Groundbreaking: September 2009
- Opened: 11 September 2014
- Cost: NIS 400 million EUR € 85 million
- Architect: Arthur Spector

Tenant
- Hapoel Jerusalem (2014–present)

The Jerusalem Arena (Hebrew: הארנה ירושלים, romanized: HaArena Yerushalayim), renamed for the National Lottery Mifal HaPais grant as Pais Arena Jerusalem (Hebrew: פיס ארנה ירושלים, romanized: HaPais Arena Yerushalayim), is a multi-purpose sports arena in Jerusalem, funded by the city council and a National Lottery grant of Mifal HaPais. Opened in September 2014, it is located in the Malha Sports Complex in the southwestern Malha neighborhood, adjacent to Teddy Stadium. The arena seats 11,000 for basketball games.

== Features ==
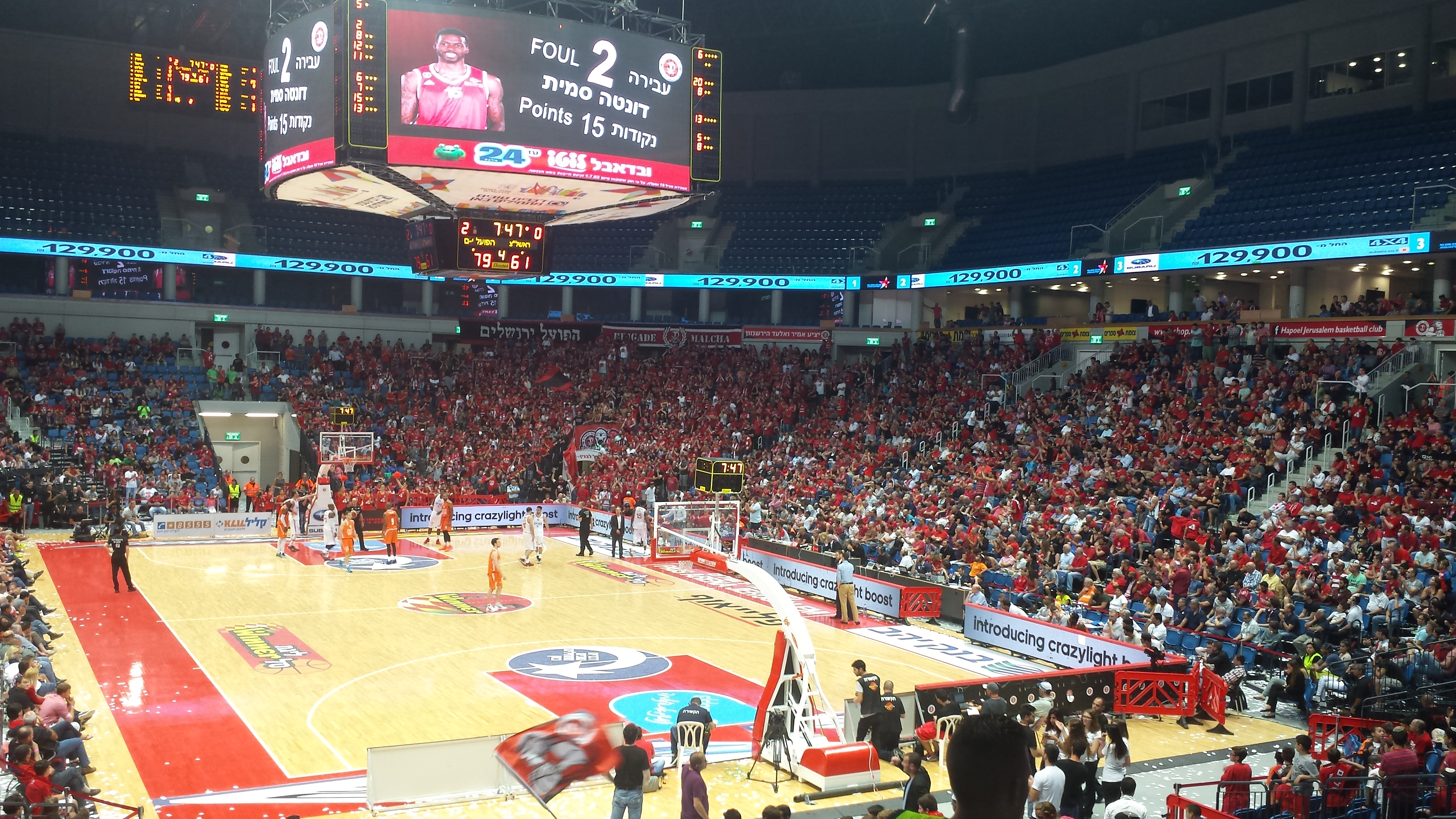
Jerusalem Arena, June 2015

The arena interior itself covers 40,000 square metres (430,000 ft^{2}) and, according to former Jerusalem Mayor Nir Barkat, the arena is the largest indoor space in Jerusalem. The arena is able to host professional sports, world-class concerts, international conferences, and cultural events. The arena also contains a medical sports center, club rooms, offices, and two additional halls. The entire complex includes 47,370 square metres (509,900 ft^{2}).

The arena is part of a number of sports facilities in the Malha Sports Complex, which include an indoor Olympic-size swimming pool, tennis courts, and an ice rink. It is also a multi-purpose site, with hotels and residences for athletes with accommodations of 240 rooms, that is able to provide facilities for exhibitions, cultural and business events. There is also an underground parking space for 1,700 cars, and a retail power center.

== History ==
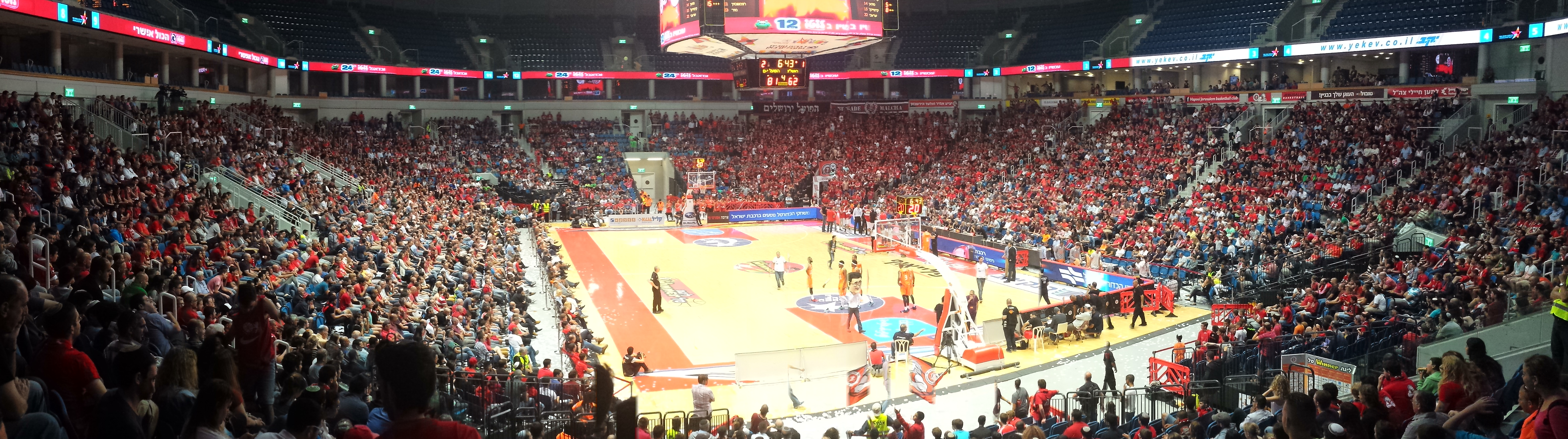
Jerusalem Pais Arena during the 2015 playoff semi-finals

In 2004, Jerusalem mayor, Ehud Olmert, declared a new basketball arena would be built within a year. In December 2005, the cornerstone was laid. In July 2009, the city hall publicized tenders for building the arena's infrastructure.

The building project was originally scheduled to be finished in late 2014, and originally estimated at a cost 240 million NIS. Of which, 187 million NIS was to be covered by Mifal HaPais, 20 million NIS from a grant from the Israeli National Sports Betting Council, and 33 million NIS from the Jerusalem municipality. However, the final eventual cost of the project ended being over 400 million NIS.

Upon completion, the arena became the new home arena of the Israeli Basketball Premiere League club Hapoel Jerusalem B.C., as they moved into it from the smaller Malha Arena, which was their previous home arena. The arena was officially opened on 11 September 2014.

During the 20th Maccabiah Games in 2017, a temporary full-size ice hockey rink was installed. The capacity of the arena (10,000 for ice hockey) made the tournament an attraction for thousands of fans, with the final game of the open tournament, in which Canada beat the United States 7:2, attracting an attendance of 9,000 and becoming the highest attended ice hockey game in history on Israeli soil.

== See also ==
- List of indoor arenas in Israel
