= Malha Mall =

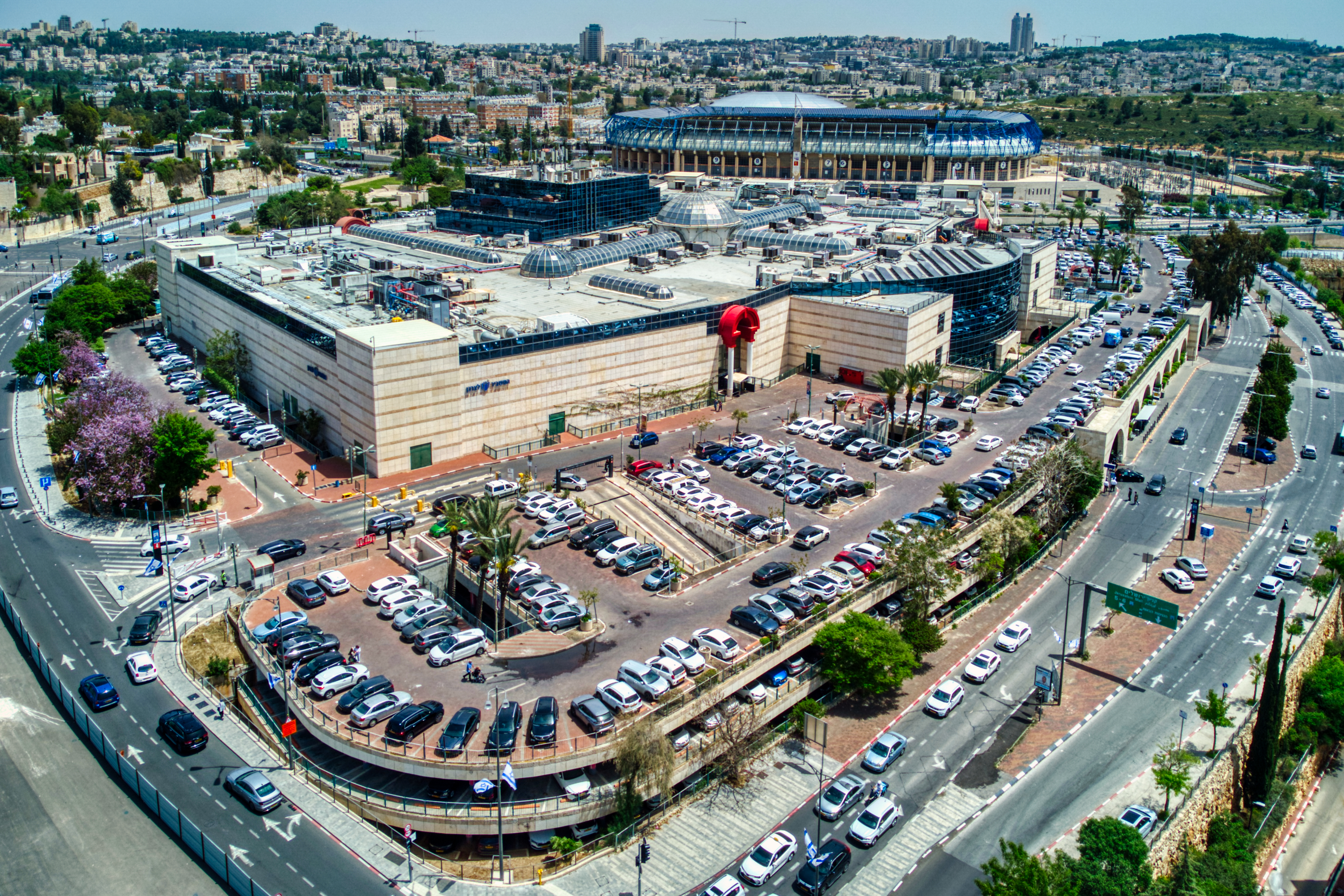
- Location: Malha, Jerusalem, Israel
- Coordinates: 31°45′06″N 35°11′14″E
- Opened: 1993
- Manager: Azrieli Group
- Owner: David Azrieli
- Num. of stores: About 260
- Num. of anchor tenants: 8
- Floor area: 40,000 square metres (430,000 sq ft)
- Floors: 3
- Parking: 2,000 free parking spots
- Website: Azrieli Mall Group

Malha Mall (Hebrew: קניון מלחה, Kanyon Malha), sometimes spelled Malcha Mall, also known as Jerusalem Mall (Hebrew: קניון ירושלים, Kanyon Yerushalayim), is an indoor shopping mall in the southwestern neighbourhood of Malha, Jerusalem.

The mall, which opened in 1993, has 260 stores on three levels with a shopping area of 37,000 square metres (400,000 sq ft) and 3,000 square metres (32,000 sq ft) of office space. It is one of seven malls built in Israel by David Azrieli.

According to Gideon Avrami, director of the mall, the mall is popular among both Jewish and Arab shoppers. In 2010, there were 1,000-1,200 Palestinian visitors a day, accounting for three percent of all shoppers. On Muslim holidays and Sundays, the figure rose to 25 percent.

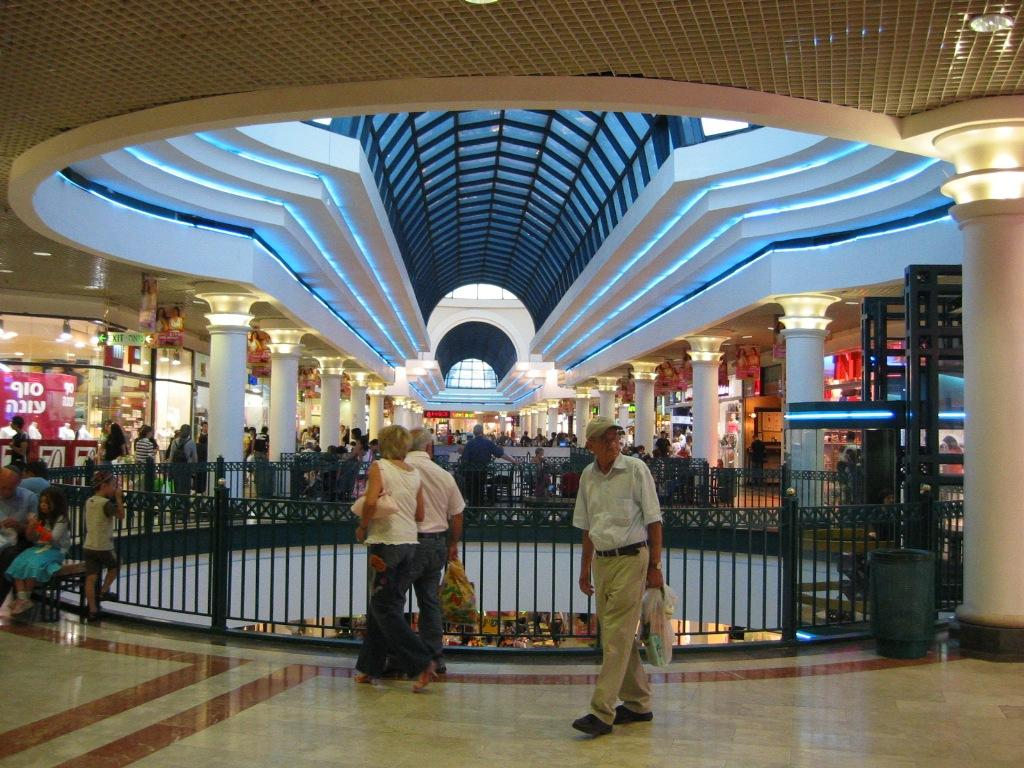
Malha mall

The mall is closed from Friday afternoon until Saturday evening out of respect for the Jewish Shabbat.

In 2011, Malha Mall was voted Israel's top mall by the Israeli financial newspaper Globes.

== See also ==
- List of shopping malls in Israel
- Azrieli Center
- Jerusalem Sports Quarter
