= Tedd (given name) =

Tedd is a given name. It is often a re-spelling of "Ted" which, in turn, is a traditional nickname for people named Theodore or Edward.

Those bearing the given name include:

- Tedd (1904–1991), American editorial cartoonist Theodor Geisel (later author/illustrator a.k.a. Dr. Seuss)
- Tedd Pierce (1906–1972), cartoon writer, animator and artist
- Tedd Arnold (born 1949), children's book writer
- Tedd Williams (born 1969), mixed martial arts fighter
- Tedd Josiah (born 1970), Kenyan music producer
- Tedd T (fl. 2000s), producer, programmer and engineer
