= Shefa =

Shefa may refer to:

- Shefa (Jewish theology) (שפע "Flow" in Hebrew), divine influence in Medieval Jewish philosophy
- Al-Shefa, one of the most famous books of Avicenna
- Shefa Province, Vanuatu
- SHEFA-2, a submarine communications cable linking the United Kingdom and the Faroe Islands
- Doron Shefa (born 1961), Israeli basketball player
- Shefa School, a Jewish day school in New York City
