= Pinnacle School =

The Pinnacle School

Location
- 201 High Ridge Road; Stamford, Connecticut 06905; United States
- Coordinates: 41.0467°N 73.5624°W

Information
- School type: Private
- Motto: Reach Your True Potential
- Established: 2011
- Sister school: The Spire School and Links Academy
- Head of school: Charlie Manos
- Grades: 2-12
- Gender: Co-educational
- Student to teacher ratio: 2:1
- Colors: Blue, white
- Website: www.thepinnacleschool.org

The Pinnacle School is a private, co-educational special education day school for students in grades 2-12 located in Stamford, Connecticut.

== History ==
Pinnacle is a for profit school that was founded in 2011 by the Greenwich Education Group, which also runs The Spire School and Links Academy, and began with a focus on students with high-functioning autism or Asperger's syndrome. The school later began serving students with language-based learning differences such as dyslexia, ADHD, and nonverbal learning disabilities.
