= The Spire School =

Coordinates: 41.0467°N 73.5625°W

Location
- 201 High Ridge Road; Stamford, Connecticut 06905; United States

Information
- School type: Private
- Motto: Know Thyself
- Established: 2010
- Sister school: Links Academy and Pinnacle School
- Director: Tammy Moscrip
- Faculty: 28
- Grades: 6–12
- Gender: Co-educational
- Enrollment: 53
- Student to teacher ratio: 2:1
- Campus: 17,000 sq ft (1,600 m^{2})
- Color(s): Cardinal Red
- Mascot: Phoenix
- Publication: InSPIREd Art & Literary Magazine
- Website: spireschool.org

The Spire School is a private, co-educational college preparatory day school in Stamford, Connecticut, for students in grades 6–12.

Spire is accredited by the New England Association of Schools and Colleges (NEASC), and is a Connecticut State-Approved Special Education School. Spire is owned and operated by the Greenwich Education Group, which also operates Links Academy and The Pinnacle School, both of which are located in Stamford, Connecticut.

The Spire School provides customized instruction for intellectually capable students who are struggling with executive functioning challenges, depression, anxiety, ineffective coping skills and other emotional issues. The Spire School supports its students with an emphasis on self-care through use of effective coping skills, exercise, nutrition and academic empowerment.

== History ==
The Spire School was founded in 2010 by Greenwich Education Group. Spire's initial debut included 10-15 students, most of which were around 10th-grade age. As of the 2018/19 school year Spire had an enrollment of 53 students, 21 of which were graduating seniors.

== Academics ==
The school has a strong academic focus that partners an individualized educational program with a health and wellness curriculum in order to help its students overcome any academic, social, or emotional difficulties that they may face. Spire's high school offers standard, advanced, and Advanced Placement (AP) college preparatory courses, as well as opportunities for college-level coursework and credit through the Norwalk Community College (NCC) High School Partnership Program and the University of Connecticut (UCONN)'s Early College Experience (ECE) Program. In the 2018/19 school year, students took a whopping 22 AP/ECE courses.

Eligible seniors have the opportunity to partake in Spire's Senior Internship Experience, an unpaid work placement outside the classroom, during the last few months of their senior year. Following this internship, those who participated present at Spire's Senior Symposium to describe their job experiences to fellow students and teachers, allowing seniors to reflect on their internships as well as inspire their younger peers to follow their educational and career goals.

== Approach ==
Each student at The Spire School is assigned a life coach, i.e. a clinical professional who holds at least a master's degree in fields relating to counseling, social work, or school psychology. Life coaches meet with students weekly, but are available on a daily basis to help reinforce skills through executive function support, cognitive behavioral therapy (CBT), and dialectical behavior therapy (DBT). Each student also has their own community of allies, which is composed of parents, teachers, counselors, psychologists, psychiatrists, and any other important adults in the student's life.

== Publications ==
=== InSPIREd ===
InSPIREd is an art & literary magazine published at the end of each school year. The magazine showcases the talents and artistic interests of any students who choose to submit their work to the publication. In the 2018/19 school year, 60% of students at Spire contributed to inSPIREd magazine.

== Administration ==
- Tammy Moscrip, Executive Director/Chief Administrator
- Cynthia Hendrickson, Education Director
- Dede LeComte, Director of Admissions
