= Israeli Basketball Premier League Quintet =

The Israeli Basketball Premier League Quintet, or Israeli Basketball Super League Quintet, is an award given to the 5 best players of each season of the Israeli Basketball Premier League, which is the top-tier level men's professional basketball league in Israel.

== All-Israeli League Team ==
Player (×)	Denotes the number of times the player has been selected.
**Player**	**Bold** text indicates the Israeli League MVP in the same year.

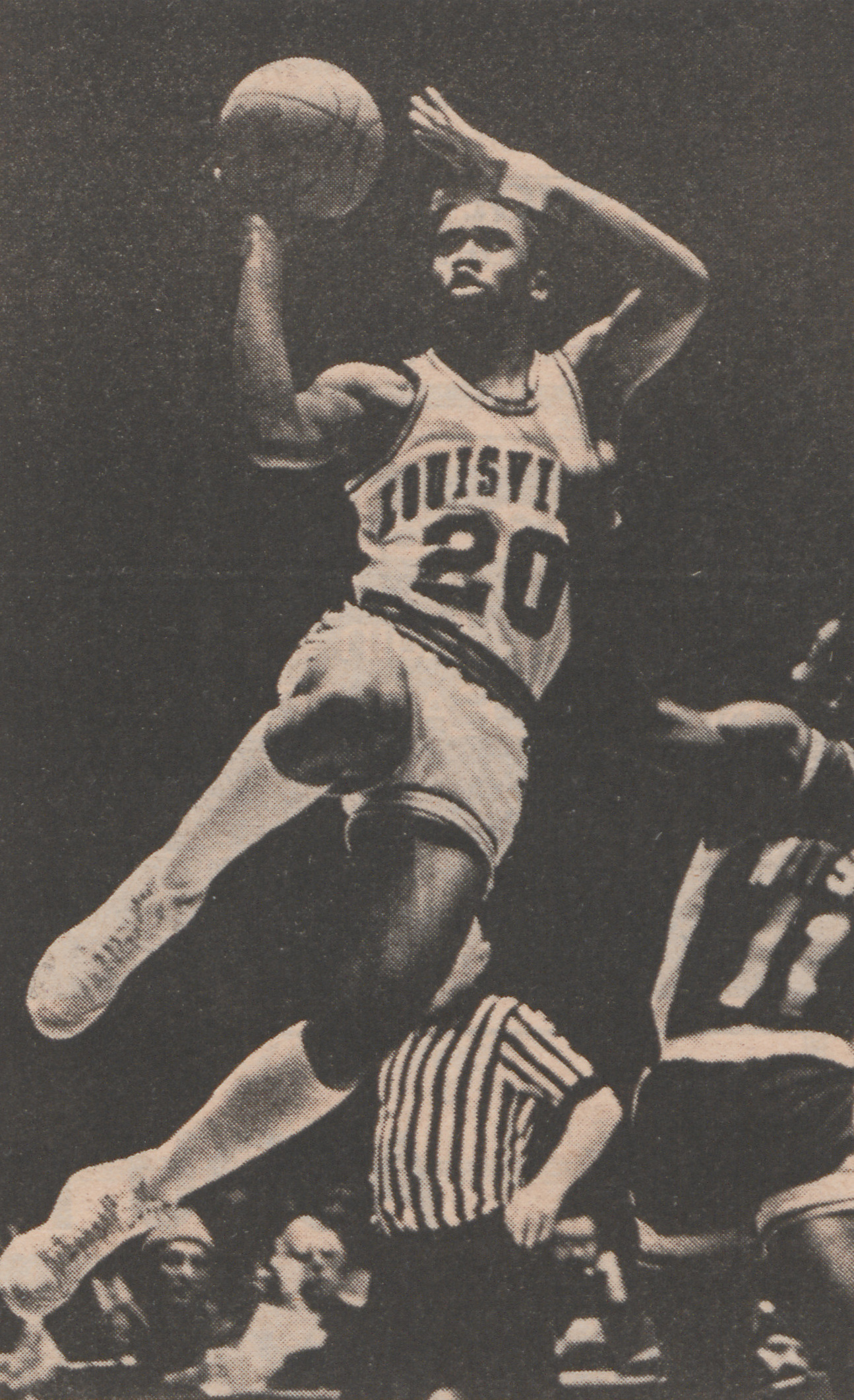
Milt Wagner

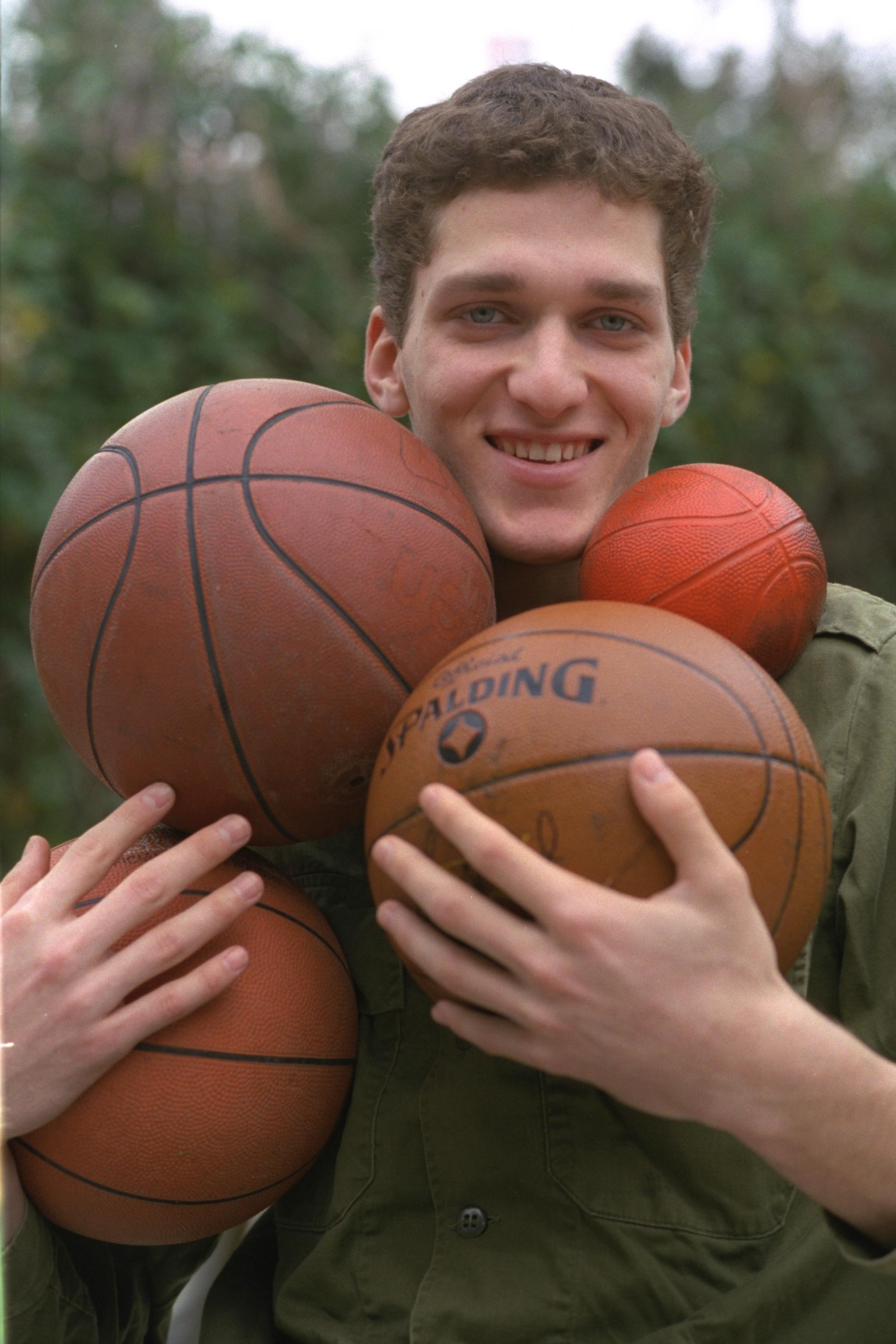
Doron Sheffer

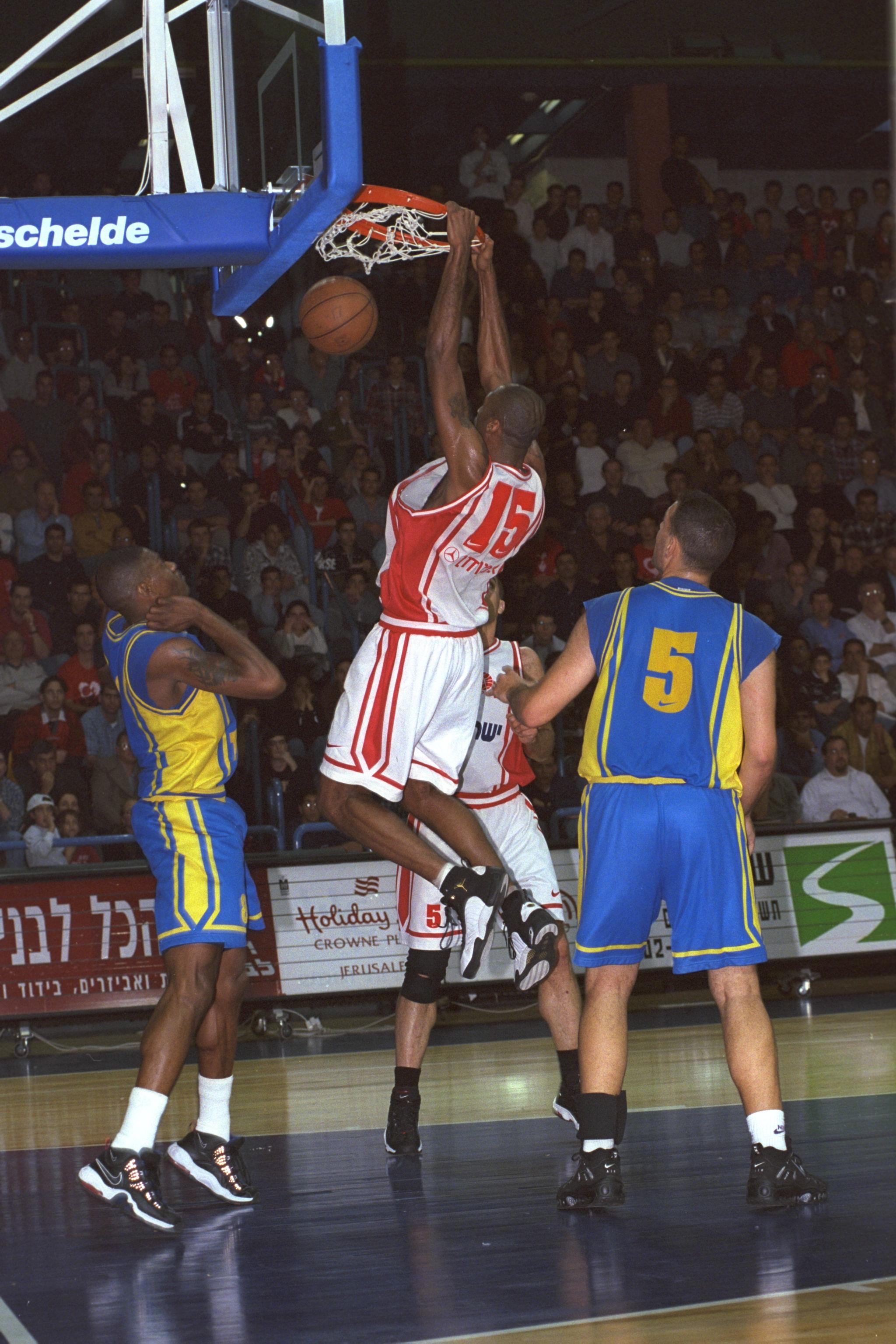
Kenny Williams

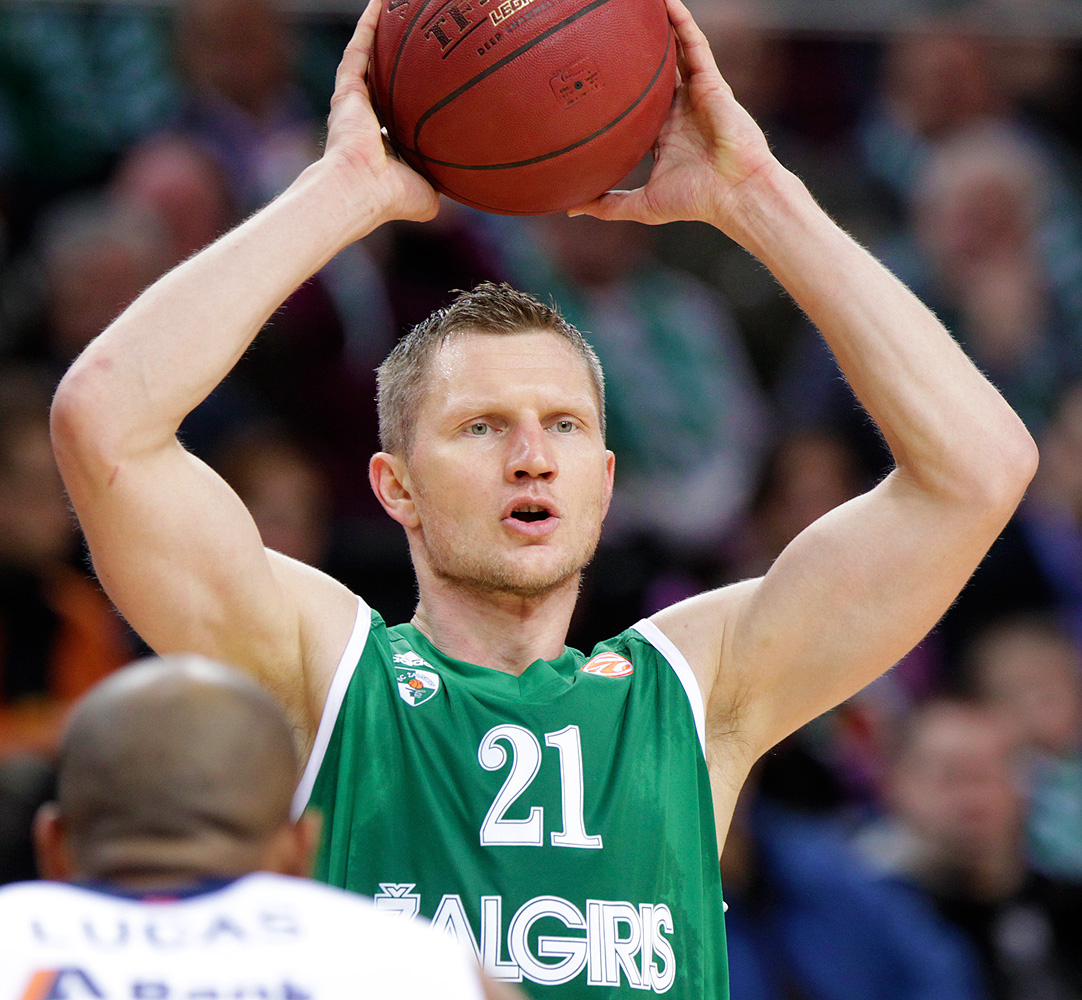
Rimantas Kaukenas

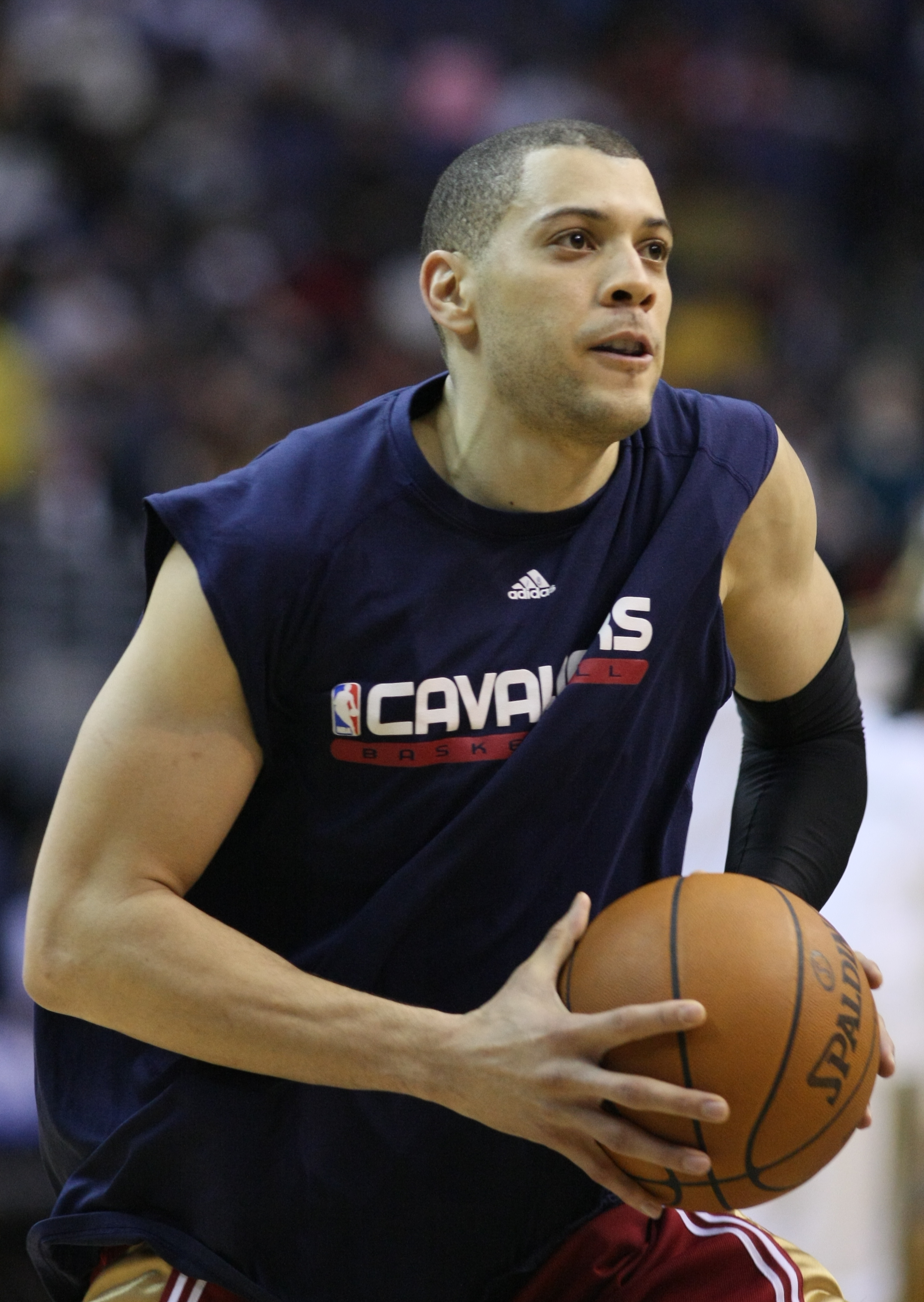
Anthony Parker

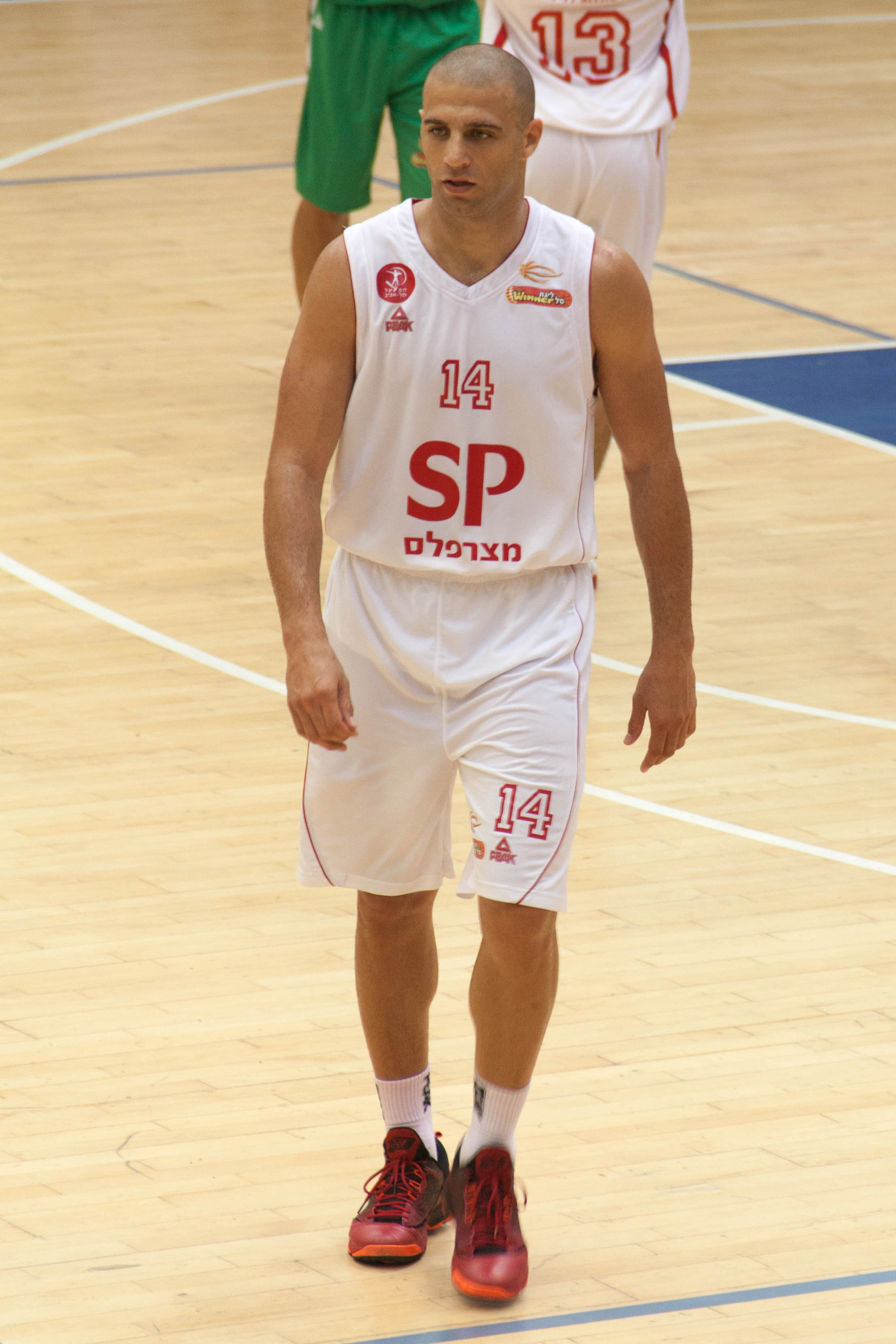
Raviv Limonad

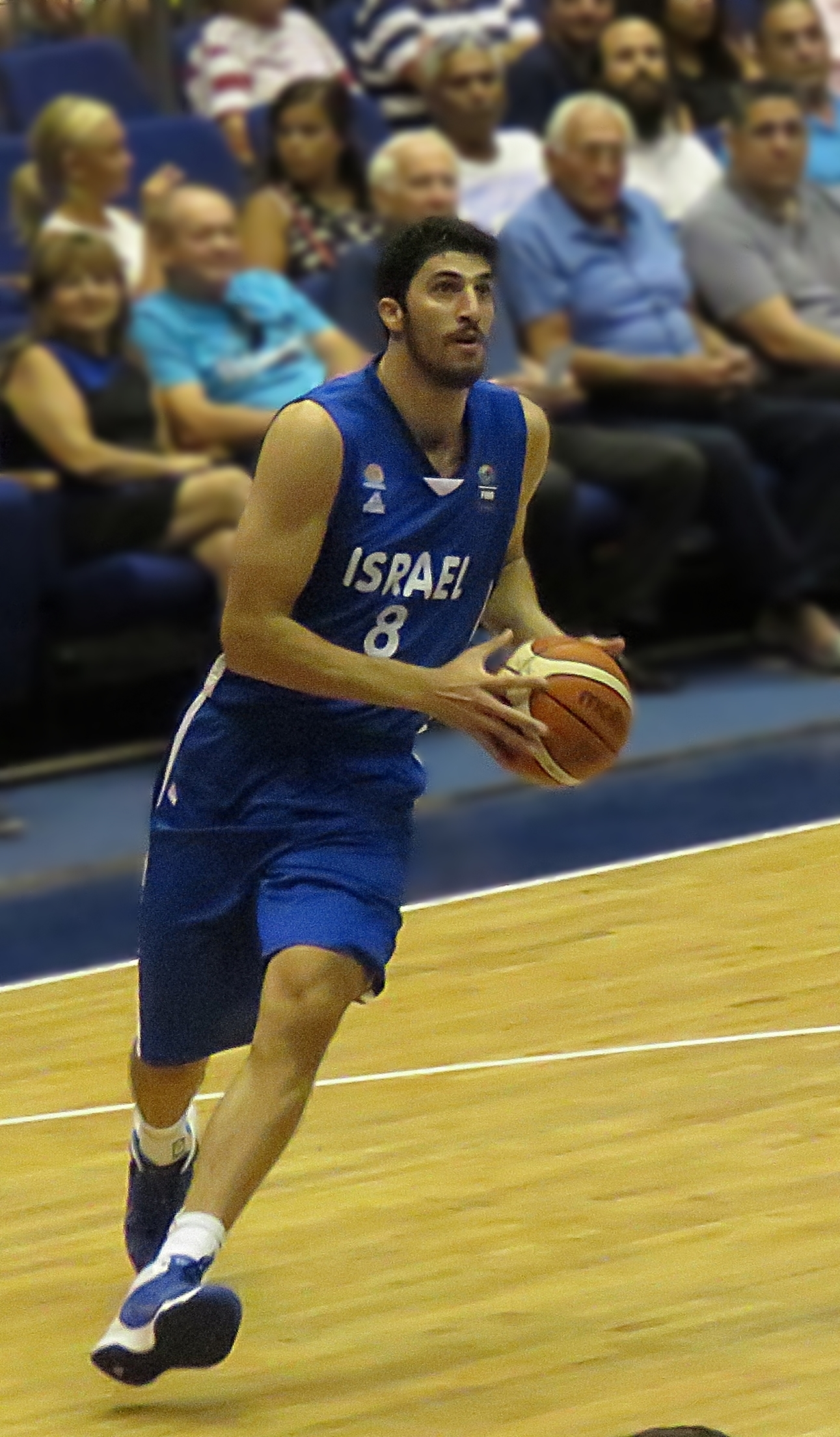
Lior Eliyahu

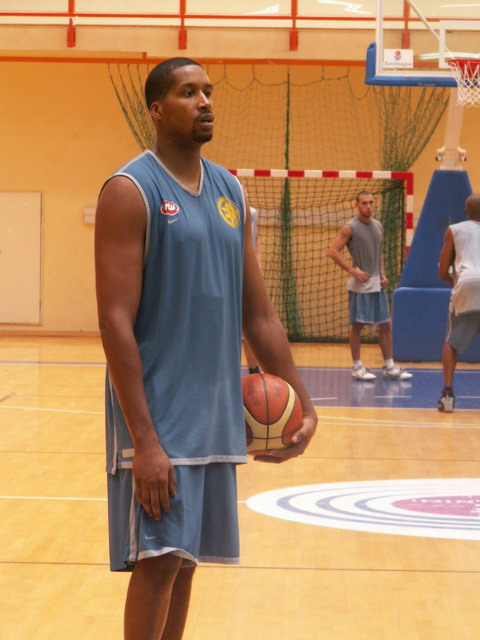
Jamie Arnold

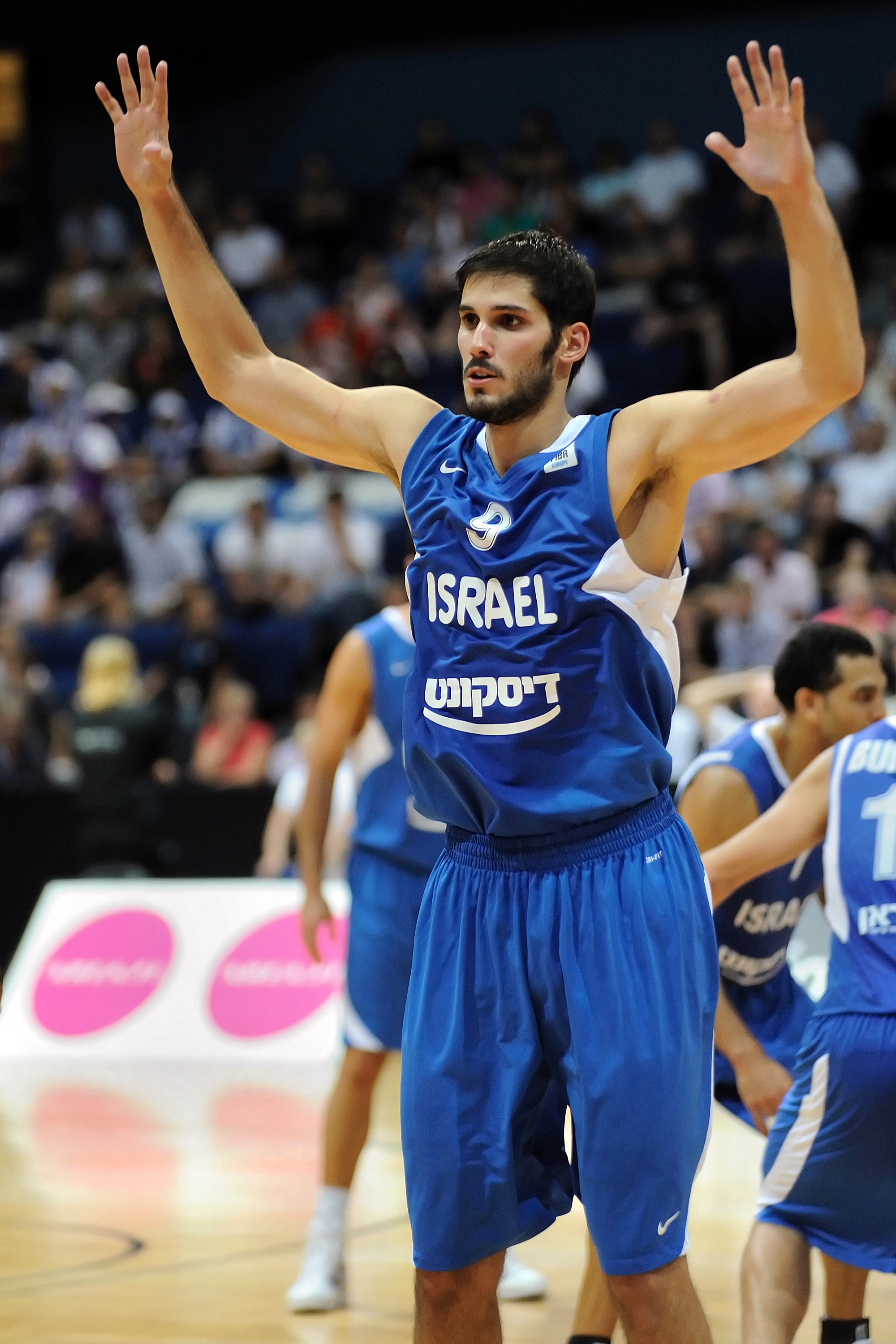
Omri Casspi

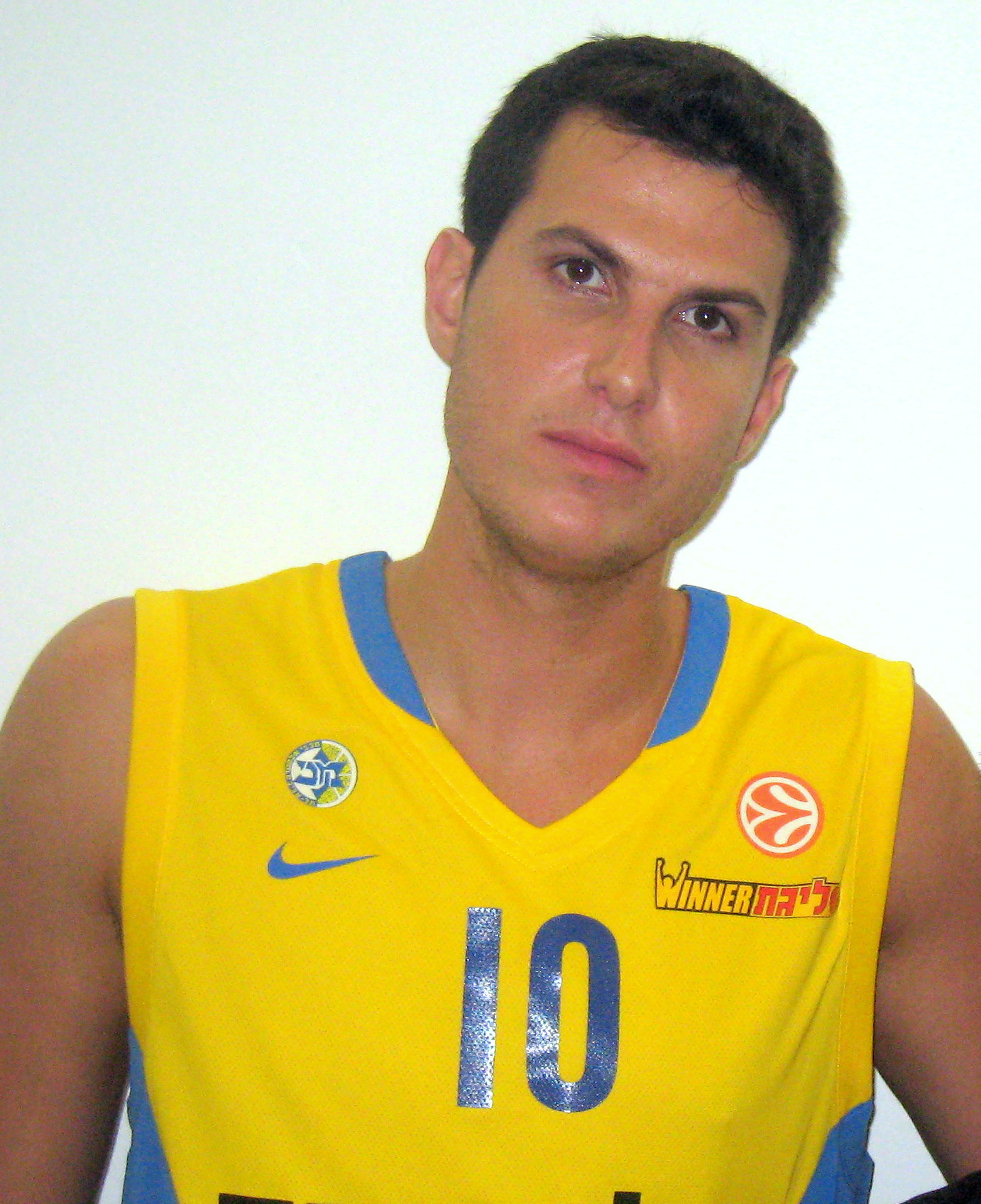
Guy Pnini

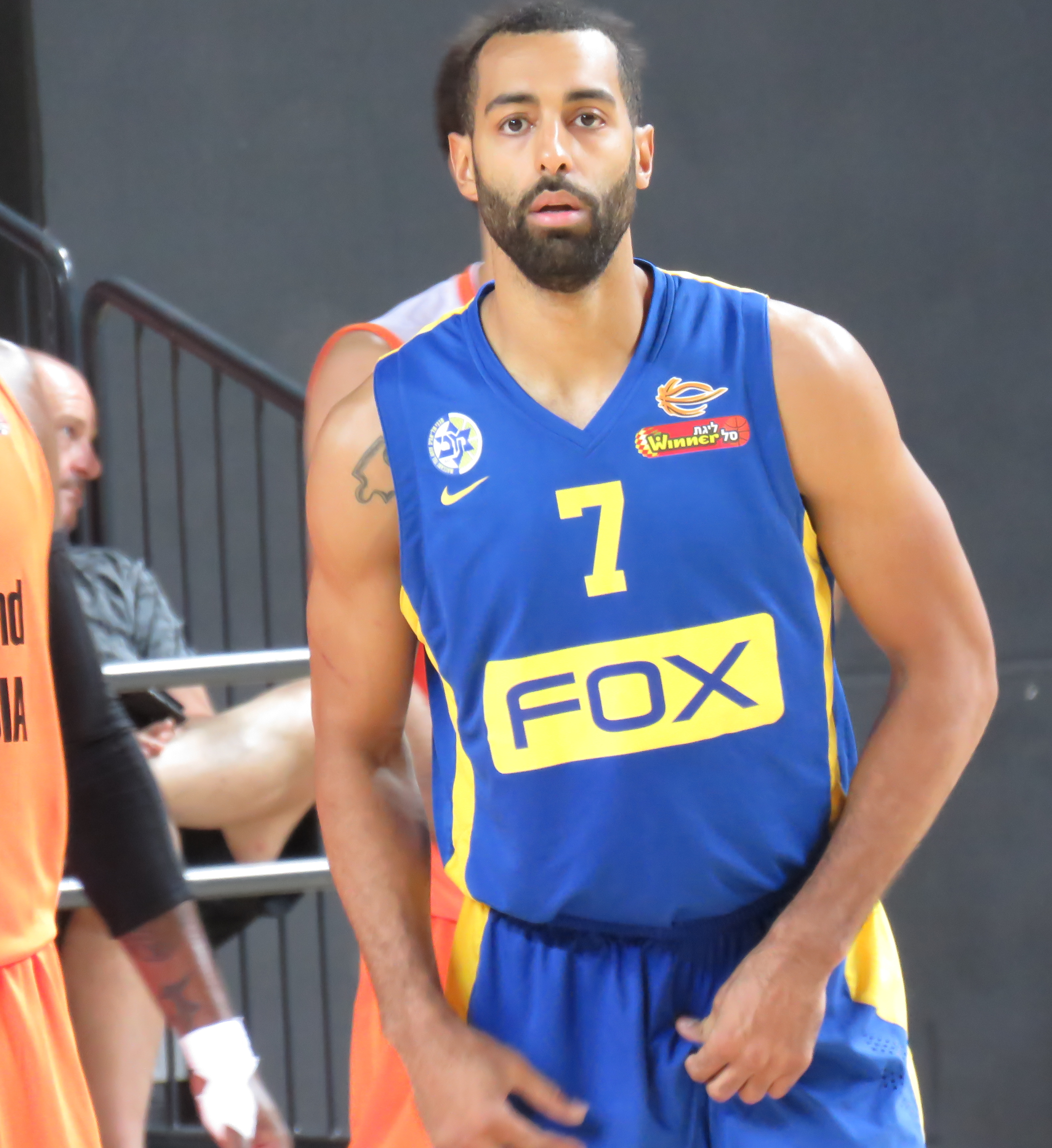
Brian Randle

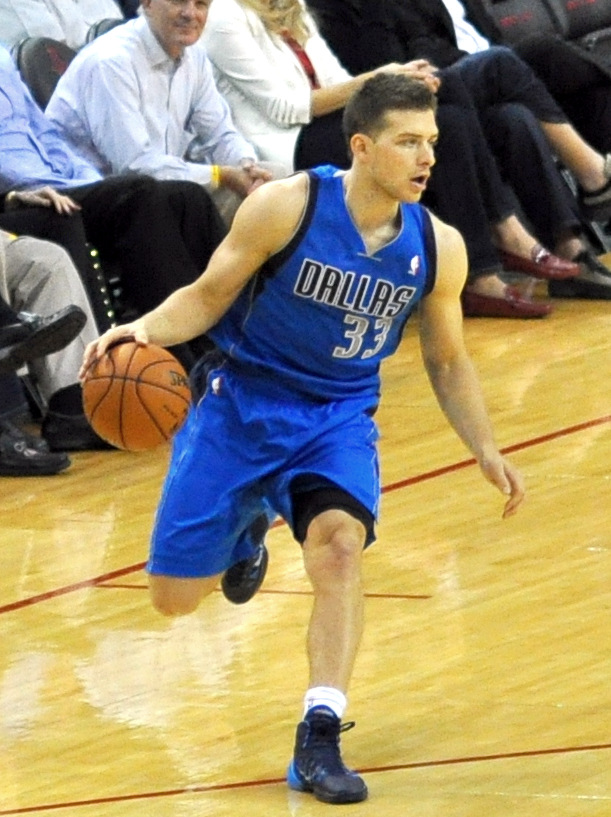
Gal Mekel

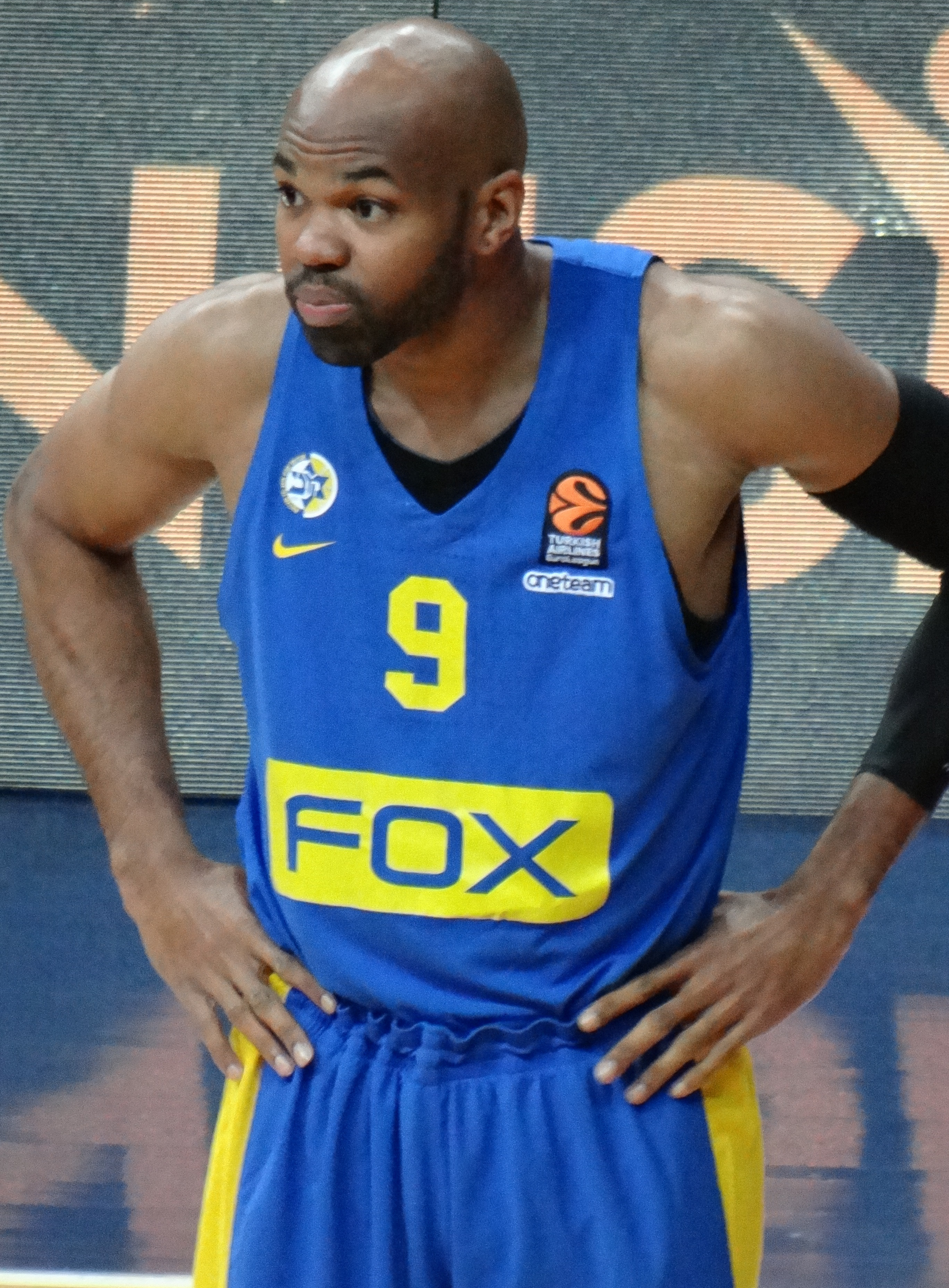
Alex Tyus

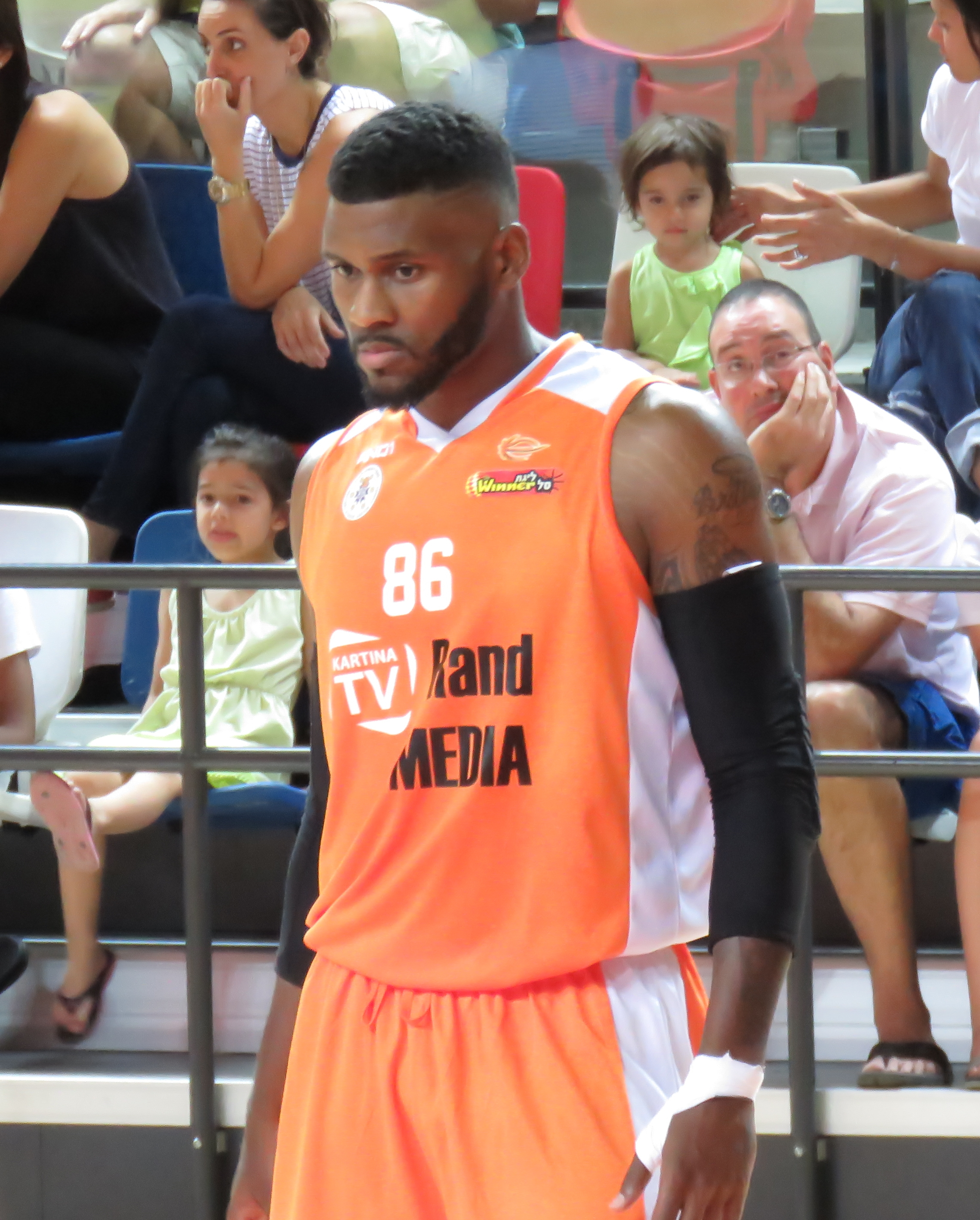
Darryl Monroe

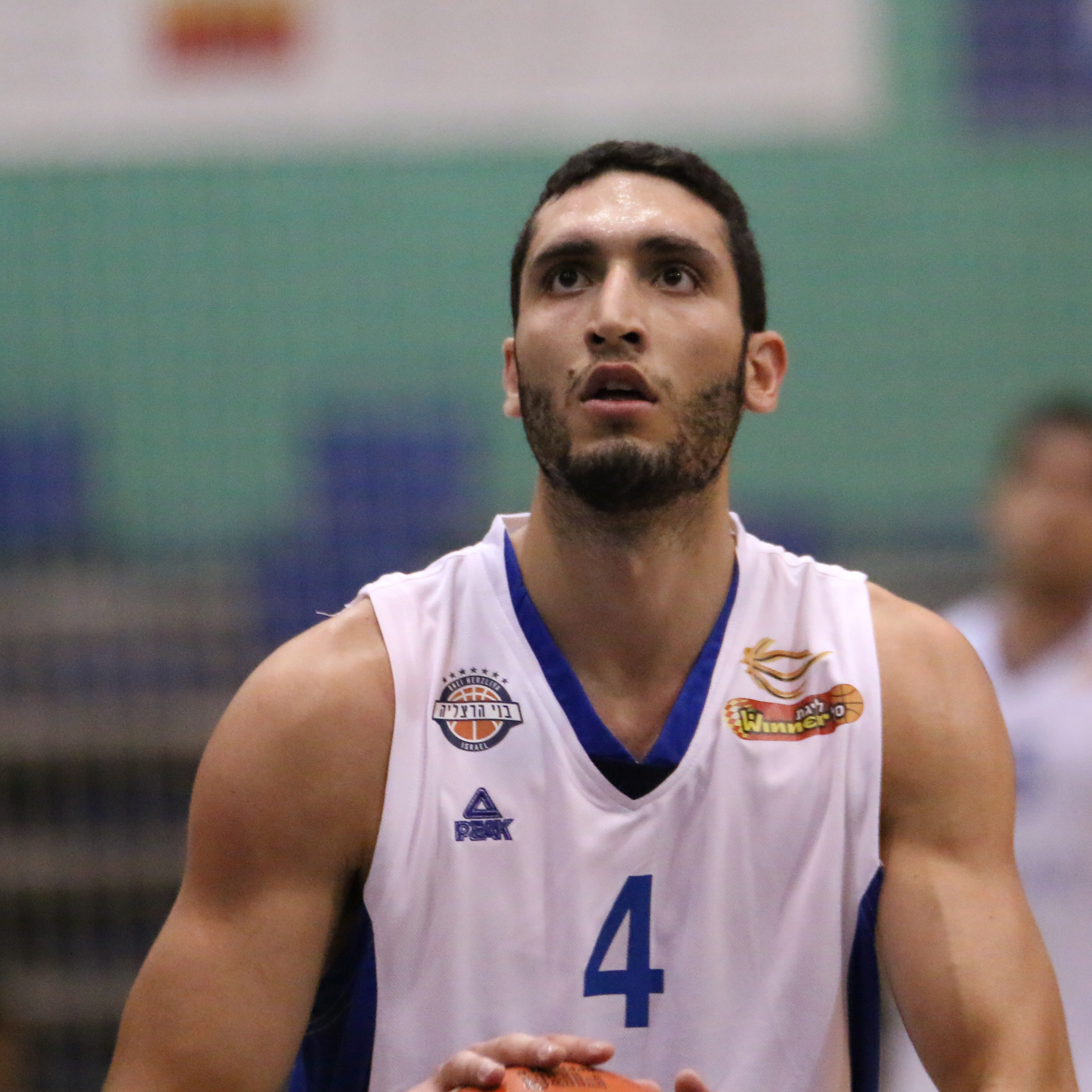
Karam Mashour

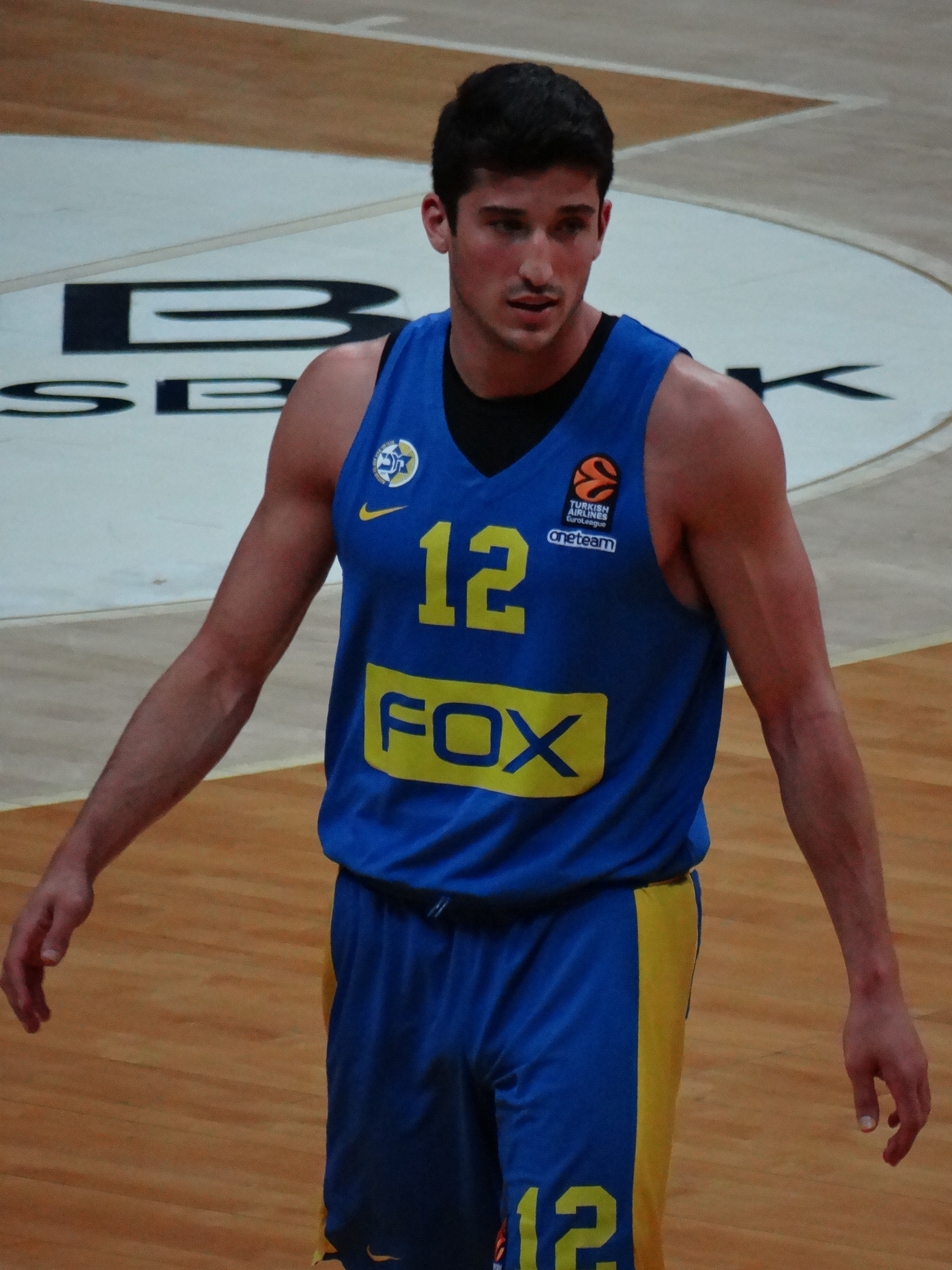
John DiBartolomeo

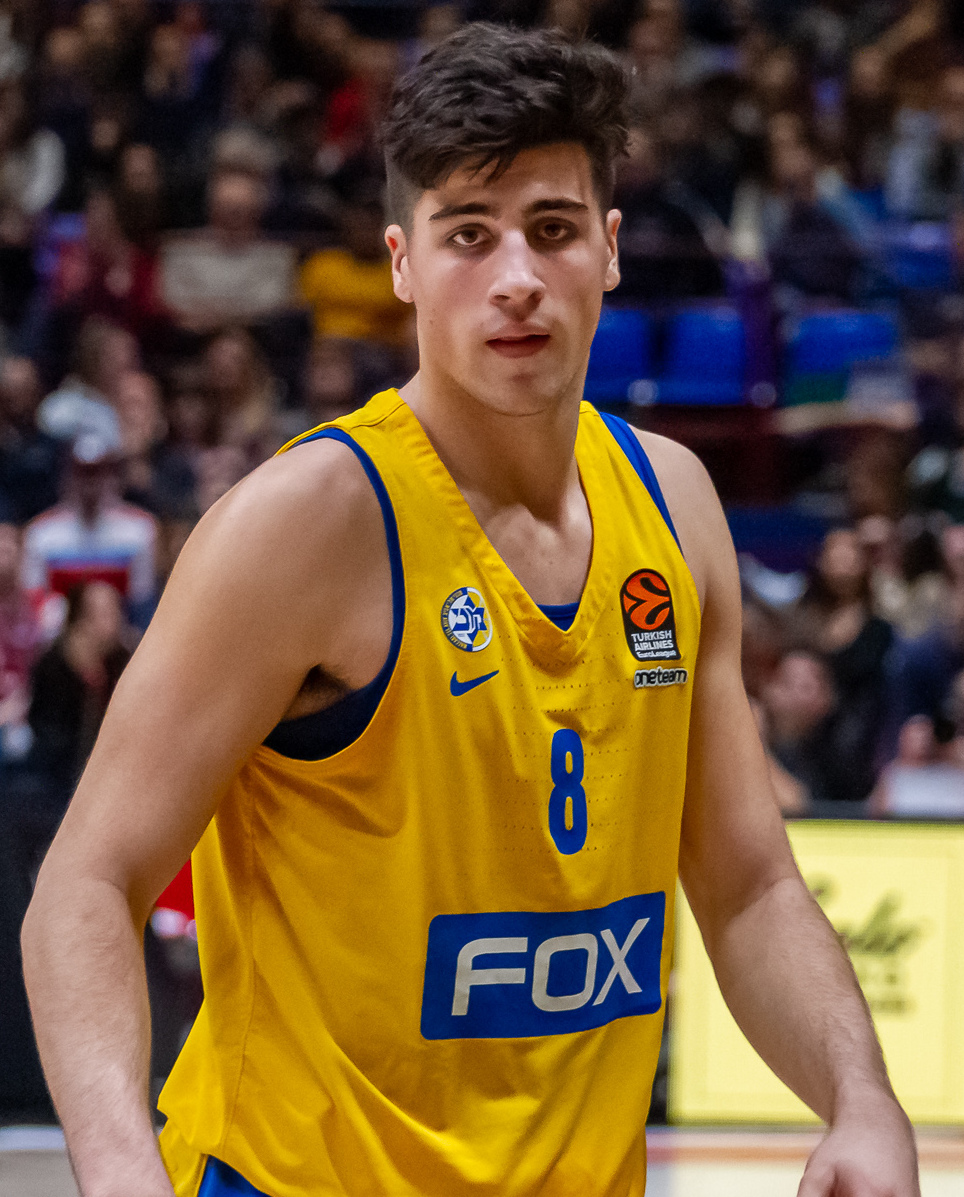
Deni Avdija

=== From 1989–90 to 2014–15 ===
Season	First Team	
Season	Player	Team
1989–90	(Israel) Adi Gordon	Hapoel Jerusalem
1989–90	(United States) (Israel) **Brad Leaf**	Hapoel Galil Elyon
1989–90	(United States) Milt Wagner	Maccabi Ramat Gan
1989–90	(United States) Richard Rellford	Maccabi Rishon LeZion
1989–90	(United States) (Israel) Earl Williams	Maccabi Ramat Gan
1990–91	(Israel) Miki Berkovich	Maccabi Rishon LeZion
1990–91	(Israel) Doron Shefa	Hapoel Jerusalem
1990–91	(United States) **David Henderson**	Hapoel Tel Aviv
1990–91	(United States) Gene Banks	Maccabi Rishon LeZion
1990–91	(United States) (Israel) LaVon Mercer	Maccabi Tel Aviv
1991–92	Israel Elimelech	Hapoel Holon
1991–92	(United States) (Israel) Brad Leaf (2×)	Hapoel Galil Elyon
1991–92	(United States) David Thirdkill	Hapoel Tel Aviv
1991–92	(United States) (Israel) **Joe Dawson**	Hapoel Eilat
1991–92	(United States) Mike Mitchell	Maccabi Tel Aviv
1992–93	(Israel) Doron Sheffer	Hapoel Galil Elyon
1992–93	(Serbia) Radenko Dobraš	Hapoel Tel Aviv
1992–93	(United States) **David Thirdkill** (2×)	Hapoel Tel Aviv
1992–93	(United States) (Israel) Joe Dawson (2×)	Hapoel Eilat
1992–93	(United States) Eddie Phillips	Hapoel Givatayim
1993–94	(United States) Milt Wagner (2×)	Beitar Ramat Gan
1993–94	(United States) **Norris Coleman**	Hapoel Jerusalem
1993–94	(United States) David Thirdkill (3×)	Hapoel Tel Aviv
1993–94	(United States) Wendell Alexis	Maccabi Tel Aviv
1993–94	(United States) Eddie Phillips (2×)	Beitar Ramat Gan
1994–95	(United States) Darren Daye	Hapoel Galil Elyon
1994–95	(United States) **Derrick Gervin**	Hapoel Gvat Yagur
1994–95	(United States) J. J. Eubanks	Maccabi Ramat Gan
1994–95	(United States) Buck Johnson	Hapoel Tel Aviv
1994–95	(United States) Billy Thompson	Hapoel Jerusalem
1995–96	(Bosnia and Herzegovina) Nenad Marković	Hapoel Tel Aviv
1995–96	(United States) (Italy) Brian Oliver	Maccabi Rishon LeZion
1995–96	(United States) Melvin Newbern	Hapoel Safed
1995–96	(Israel) Gur Shelef	Hapoel Galil Elyon
1995–96	(United States) (Jamaica) **Andrew Kennedy**	Hapoel Galil Elyon
1996–97	(Israel) Adi Gordon (2×)	Hapoel Jerusalem
1996–97	(United States) Corey Gaines	Hapoel Eilat
1996–97	(United States) (Israel) Mark Brisker	Maccabi Ra'anana
1996–97	(Israel) **Tomer Steinhauer**	Maccabi Ra'anana
1996–97	(United States) Dametri Hill	Hapoel Tel Aviv
1997–98	(Israel) **Oded Kattash**	Maccabi Tel Aviv
1997–98	(Israel) Doron Sheffer (2×)	Maccabi Tel Aviv
1997–98	(United States) (Israel) Mark Brisker (2×)	Maccabi Ra'anana
1997–98	(Israel) Tomer Steinhauer (2×)	Maccabi Ra'anana
1997–98	(United States) Ed Elisma	Hapoel Eilat
1998–99	(Israel) Oded Kattash (2×)	Maccabi Tel Aviv
1998–99	(United States) Greg Sutton	Hapoel Holon
1998–99	(United States) Kenny Williams	Hapoel Jerusalem
1998–99	(Serbia) **Radisav Ćurčić**	Hapoel Jerusalem
1998–99	(United States) Victor Alexander	Maccabi Tel Aviv
1999–00	(United States) (Slovenia) **Ariel McDonald**	Maccabi Tel Aviv
1999–00	(Israel) Yoav Saffar	Hapoel Galil Elyon
1999–00	(United States) Kenny Williams (2×)	Hapoel Jerusalem
1999–00	(Israel) Amir Muchtari	Hapoel Haifa
1999–00	(United States) Nate Huffman	Maccabi Tel Aviv
2000–01	(United States) (Slovenia) Ariel McDonald (2×)	Maccabi Tel Aviv
2000–01	(Lithuania) Rimantas Kaukėnas	Hapoel Galil Elyon
2000–01	(Israel) Yoav Saffar (2×)	Hapoel Galil Elyon
2000–01	(United States) Tony Dorsey	Hapoel Jerusalem
2000–01	(United States) **Nate Huffman** (2×)	Maccabi Tel Aviv
2001–02	(Israel) **Meir Tapiro**	Hapoel Jerusalem
2001–02	(United States) (United Kingdom) Danny Lewis	Ironi Ramat Gan
2001–02	(United States) Anthony Parker	Maccabi Tel Aviv
2001–02	(Canada) (Cameroon) Charles Minlend	Maccabi Givat Shmuel
2001–02	(Croatia) Siniša Kelečević	Hapoel Jerusalem
2002–03	(United States) Lucius Davis	Maccabi Rishon Lezion
2002–03	(United States) (South Korea) Jarod Stevenson	Bnei Hasharon
2002–03	(Canada) (Cameroon) **Charles Minlend** (2×)	Maccabi Givat Shmuel
2002–03	(Israel) Ido Kozikaro	Hapoel Galil Elyon
2002–03	(Croatia) Nikola Vujčić	Maccabi Tel Aviv
2003–04	(Lithuania) Šarūnas Jasikevičius	Maccabi Tel Aviv
2003–04	(Israel) Meir Tapiro (2×)	Bnei Hasharon
2003–04	(United States) **Anthony Parker** (2×)	Maccabi Tel Aviv
2003–04	(United States) Eric Campbell	Ironi Nahariya
2003–04	(Croatia) Nikola Vujčić (2×)	Maccabi Tel Aviv
2004–05	(Lithuania) **Šarūnas Jasikevičius** (2×)	Maccabi Tel Aviv
2004–05	(United States) Cory Carr	Ironi Ashkelon
2004–05	(United States) Anthony Parker (3×)	Maccabi Tel Aviv
2004–05	(United States) Kelvin Gibbs	Hapoel Tel Aviv
2004–05	(Israel) Lior Eliyahu	Hapoel Galil Elyon
2005–06	(United States) **Timmy Bowers**	Maccabi Givat Shmuel
2005–06	(Israel) Or Eitan	Maccabi Rishon LeZion
2005–06	(United States) Omar Sneed	Maccabi Rishon LeZion
2005–06	(Israel) Lior Eliyahu (2×)	Hapoel Galil Elyon
2005–06	(United States) Mario Austin	Hapoel Jerusalem
2006–07	(Israel) Raviv Limonad	Ironi Nahariya
2006–07	(United States) Tre Simmons	Hapoel Galil Elyon
2006–07	(United States) **Lee Nailon**	Bnei Hasharon
2006–07	(United States) Mario Austin (2×)	Hapoel Jerusalem
2006–07	(Croatia) Nikola Vujčić (3×)	Maccabi Tel Aviv
2007–08	(Israel) Meir Tapiro (3×)	Bnei HaSharon
2007–08	(United States) **P. J. Tucker**	Hapoel Holon
2007–08	(United States) Terence Morris	Maccabi Tel Aviv
2007–08	(United States) (Israel) Jamie Arnold	Hapoel Jerusalem
2007–08	(United States) Otis Hill	Ironi Nahariya
2008–09	(United States) **Doron Perkins**	Maccabi Haifa
2008–09	(Dominican Republic) Luis Flores	Hapoel Holon
2008–09	(United States) Omar Sneed (2×)	Hapoel Jerusalem
2008–09	(Israel) Omri Casspi	Maccabi Tel Aviv
2008–09	(Israel) Lior Eliyahu (3×)	Maccabi Tel Aviv
2009–10	(Israel) Shmulik Brener	Barak Netanya
2009–10	(Panama) Danilo Pinnock	Barak Netanya
2009–10	(Israel) Guy Pnini	Maccabi Tel Aviv
2009–10	(Israel) **Elishay Kadir**	Hapoel Gilboa Galil
2009–10	(United States) Brian Randle	Hapoel Gilboa Galil
2010–11	(Israel) Moran Roth	Hapoel Holon
2010–11	(United States) Jeremy Pargo	Maccabi Tel Aviv
2010–11	(Israel) **Gal Mekel**	Hapoel Gilboa Galil
2010–11	(United States) Dwayne Mitchell	Maccabi Rishon Lezion
2010–11	(Israel) Lior Eliyahu (4×)	Maccabi Tel Aviv
2011–12	(Israel) Moran Roth (2×)	Hapoel Holon
2011–12	(United States) Derwin Kitchen	Maccabi Rishon LeZion
2011–12	(United States) Josh Carter	Maccabi Ashdod
2011–12	(Israel) **Lior Eliyahu** (5×)	Maccabi Tel Aviv
2011–12	(United States) Bryant Dunston	Hapoel Holon
2012–13	(Israel) **Gal Mekel** (2×)	Maccabi Haifa
2012–13	(United States) Scotty Hopson	Hapoel Eilat
2012–13	(United States) Devin Smith	Maccabi Tel Aviv
2012–13	(Greece) (United States) Pat Calathes	Maccabi Haifa
2012–13	(United States) Shawn James	Maccabi Tel Aviv
2013–14	(Israel) Raviv Limonad (2×)	Hapoel Tel Aviv
2013–14	(United States) Kevin Palmer	Hapoel Eilat
2013–14	(United States) (Venezuela) **Donta Smith**	Maccabi Haifa
2013–14	(United States) Josh Duncan	Hapoel Jerusalem
2013–14	(United States) (Israel) Alex Tyus	Maccabi Tel Aviv
2014–15	(United States) Khalif Wyatt	Hapoel Eilat
2014–15	(Israel) Shawn Dawson	Maccabi Rishon LeZion
2014–15	(United States) Devin Smith (2×)	Maccabi Tel Aviv
2014–15	(Israel) **Lior Eliyahu** (6×)	Hapoel Jerusalem
2014–15	(Nigeria) Ike Ofoegbu	Maccabi Haifa

=== From 2015–16 ===
Season	First Team		Second Team	
Season	Player	Team	Player	Team
2015–16	(Israel) Gal Mekel (3×)	Maccabi Tel Aviv	(Venezuela) Gregory Vargas	Maccabi Haifa
2015–16	(United States) Khalif Wyatt (2×)	Hapoel Eilat	(Israel) Shawn Dawson	Maccabi Rishon LeZion
2015–16	(United States) (Venezuela) Donta Smith (2×)	Hapoel Jerusalem	(Israel) Raviv Limonad	Hapoel Tel Aviv
2015–16	(Israel) Lior Eliyahu (7×)	Hapoel Jerusalem	(United States) Will Clyburn	Hapoel Holon
2015–16	(United States) **Darryl Monroe**	Maccabi Rishon LeZion	(United States) (Israel) Richard Howell	Ironi Nahariya
2016–17	(United States) (Israel) **John DiBartolomeo**	Maccabi Haifa	(Venezuela) Gregory Vargas (2×)	Maccabi Haifa
2016–17	(United States) Curtis Jerrells	Hapoel Jerusalem	(Israel) Rafi Menco	Hapoel Eilat
2016–17	(United States) Andrew Goudelock	Maccabi Tel Aviv	(United States) Landon Milbourne	Hapoel Eilat
2016–17	(United States) James Bell	Hapoel Holon	(United States) Darion Atkins	Hapoel Holon
2016–17	(Israel) Karam Mashour	Bnei Herzliya	(Israel) (Sweden) Jonathan Skjöldebrand	Ironi Nahariya
2017–18	(United States) Jerome Dyson	Hapoel Jerusalem	(United States) (Israel) John DiBartolomeo	Maccabi Tel Aviv
2017–18	(United States) (Jamaica) **Sek Henry**	Maccabi Ashdod	(United States) Jordan Loyd	Hapoel Eilat
2017–18	(Israel) Amit Simhon	Hapoel Eilat	(Israel) Joaquin Szuchman	Hapoel Gilboa Galil
2017–18	(United States) (Israel) Joe Alexander	Hapoel Holon	(Israel) Tomer Ginat	Hapoel Tel Aviv
2017–18	(United States) Zach LeDay	Hapoel Gilboa Galil	(United States) (Israel) Alex Tyus	Maccabi Tel Aviv
2018–19	(United States) (Israel) John DiBartolomeo (2×)	Maccabi Tel Aviv	(United States) Cameron Long	Maccabi Rishon LeZion
2018–19	(United States) **Corey Walden**	Hapoel Holon	(Israel) Tal Dunne	Ironi Ness Ziona
2018–19	(United States) (Dominican Republic) James Feldeine	Hapoel Jerusalem	(Israel) Guy Pnini	Hapoel Holon
2018–19	(United States) Elijah Bryant	Hapoel Eilat	(Nigeria) (United States) Suleiman Braimoh	Hapoel Eilat
2018–19	(Israel) Tomer Ginat	Hapoel Tel Aviv	(United States) Tarik Black	Maccabi Tel Aviv
2019–20	(United States) Scottie Wilbekin	Maccabi Tel Aviv	Not awarded	
2019–20	(United States) J'Covan Brown	Hapoel Jerusalem	Not awarded	
2019–20	(United States) Alex Hamilton	Maccabi Rishon LeZion	Not awarded	
2019–20	(Israel) **Deni Avdija**	Maccabi Tel Aviv	Not awarded	
2019–20	(Israel) Tomer Ginat (2×)	Hapoel Tel Aviv	Not awarded	
2020–21	(Israel) Yiftach Ziv	Hapoel Gilboa Galil	(Israel) Yam Madar	Hapoel Tel Aviv
2020–21	(United States) Scottie Wilbekin (2×)	Maccabi Tel Aviv	(United States) Keenan Evans	Hapoel Haifa
2020–21	(United States) Chris Johnson	Hapoel Holon	(Nigeria) (Canada) Caleb Agada	Hapoel Be'er Sheva
2020–21	(United States) **Casey Prather**	Hapoel Eilat	(United States) Kerry Blackshear	Hapoel Gilboa Galil
2020–21	(Croatia) Ante Žižić	Maccabi Tel Aviv	(United States) Josh Nebo	Hapoel Eilat
2021–22	(Belgium) Retin Obasohan	Hapoel Jerusalem	(United States) Joe Ragland	Hapoel Holon
2021–22	(United States) Chris Babb	Bnei Herzliya	(United States) Jalen Adams	Hapoel Jerusalem
2021–22	(United States) Chris Johnson (2×)	Hapoel Holon	(United States) Scottie Wilbekin	Maccabi Tel Aviv
2021–22	(Israel) Nimrod Levi	Hapoel Galil Elyon	(United States) JP Tokoto	Hapoel Tel Aviv
2021–22	(United States) **Chinanu Onuaku**	Bnei Herzliya	(Israel) Roman Sorkin	Maccabi Tel Aviv
2022–23	(United States) D. J. Cooper	Ironi Ness Ziona	(United States) Wade Baldwin	Maccabi Tel Aviv
2022–23	(United States) Joe Ragland	Hapoel Holon	(United States) Khadeen Carrington	Hapoel Jerusalem
2022–23	(Israel) Tomer Ginat (3×)	Hapoel Tel Aviv	(United States) Jordan McRae	Hapoel Tel Aviv
2022–23	(Israel) Roman Sorkin	Maccabi Tel Aviv	(Israel) Nimrod Levi	Hapoel Galil Elyon
2022–23	(United States) **Zach Hankins**	Hapoel Jerusalem	(United States) Maurice Kemp	Bnei Herzliya
2023–24	(Israel) Roi Huber	Hapoel Galil Elyon	(Israel) Tamir Blatt	Maccabi Tel Aviv
2023–24	(United States) Levi Randolph	Hapoel Jerusalem	(United States) James Batemon	Ironi Kiryat Ata
2023–24	(Israel) Tomer Ginat (4×)	Hapoel Tel Aviv	(Israel) Adam Ariel	Maccabi Ironi Ramat Gan
2023–24	(Israel) **Roman Sorkin** (2×)	Maccabi Tel Aviv	(France) (United States) Jaylen Hoard	Hapoel Tel Aviv
2023–24	(United States) Amin Stevens	Ironi Kiryat Ata	(United States) Justin Smith	Hapoel Holon
2024–25	(United States) **Jared Harper**	Hapoel Jerusalem	Not awarded	
2024–25	(United States) Kendale McCullum	Maccabi Ironi Ramat Gan	Not awarded	
2024–25	(Israel) Gur Lavy	Hapoel Gilboa Galil	Not awarded	
2024–25	(Israel) Roman Sorkin (3×)	Maccabi Tel Aviv	Not awarded	
2024–25	(United States) Johnathan Motley	Hapoel Tel Aviv	Not awarded	
2025–26	(United States) **Jared Harper** (2×)	Hapoel Jerusalem	Not awarded	
2025–26	(United States) Jimmy Clark III	Maccabi Tel Aviv	Not awarded	
2025–26	(United States) Kyler Edwards	Hapoel HaEmek	Not awarded	
2025–26	(Israel) Roman Sorkin (4×)	Maccabi Tel Aviv	Not awarded	
2025–26	(United States) Tai Odiase	Hapoel Tel Aviv	Not awarded	

== Most selections ==
Player	Total	First team	Second team	Teams
(Israel) Lior Eliyahu	7	7	0	Hapoel Galil Elyon (2×); Maccabi Tel Aviv (3×); Hapoel Jerusalem (2×)
(Israel) Tomer Ginat	5	4	1	Hapoel Tel Aviv
(Israel) Roman Sorkin	4	3	1	Maccabi Tel Aviv
(United States) David Thirdkill	3	3	0	Hapoel Tel Aviv
(United States) Anthony Parker	3	3	0	Maccabi Tel Aviv
(Croatia) Nikola Vujčić	3	3	0	Maccabi Tel Aviv
(Israel) Meir Tapiro	3	3	0	Hapoel Jerusalem; Bnei HaSharon (2×)
(Israel) Gal Mekel	3	3	0	Hapoel Gilboa Galil; Maccabi Haifa; Maccabi Tel Aviv
(United States) (Israel) John DiBartolomeo	3	2	1	Maccabi Haifa; Maccabi Tel Aviv (2×)
(United States) Scottie Wilbekin	3	2	1	Maccabi Tel Aviv
