= Shefa School =

The Shefa School
- Hebrew: בית ספר שֶׁפַע

Location
- 17 West 60th St; New York City 10023; United States

Information
- Type: Private day school
- Religious affiliation: Jewish
- Denomination: Pluralistic Judaism
- Established: 2014 (12 years ago)
- NCES School ID: A1502585
- Head of school: Ilana Ruskay-Kidd
- Grades: 1–8
- Enrollment: 200
- Student to teacher ratio: 3:1
- Campus type: Urban
- Website: www.shefaschool.org

The Shefa School is a pluralistic Jewish day school for children with language-based learning disabilities in NoMad, Manhattan. The school's name Shefa (Hebrew: שֶׁפַע / שֶׁפַע) means "abundance".

The Shefa School was founded by Ilana Ruskay-Kidd, and opened in 2014. It was founded to educate Jewish children between grades 1 and 8 with language-based learning disabilities, with the goal of preparing them to enrol in mainstream schools when they are ready. The school is pluralistic, and enrols students from a variety of Jewish backgrounds and observances.

== History ==
The school had an inaugural class of 24 students with 12 faculty and staff in 2014, and grew to 80 students and 42 faculty and staff by 2016. It moved from a five-classroom space at Lincoln Square Synagogue to a dedicated campus at 40 East 29th Street in September 2016. In 2016, Ruskay-Kidd received a Covenant Award for her work as head of the Shefa School.

In 2018, Shefa honored its first 8th grade class at its inaugural Benefit. The 11 students in that class graduated later that spring in Shefa's first graduation ceremony, held at the school.

During the COVID-19 pandemic, the school retooled its teaching approach, and moved to even smaller class sizes to follow social distancing requirements.

By February 2022, the school had 200 students and was constructing a new campus to accommodate 350 students, slated for completion in February 2024. Students from the Shefa School recited the Seder Order song (Kadesh Urchatz) and the Four Questions during the 2022 virtual White House Passover Seder held by President Joe Biden.

== Academics ==
The Shefa School has a low student–teacher ratio of 3:1 and provides individualized teaching to students who have difficulty in traditional classroom settings. The school offers a comprehensive academic program. Students are taught grade-level content for the critical analysis required in mainstream middle and high schools. The curriculum incorporates the PAF Reading Program, which uses an Orton-Gillingham and multisensory approach to learning. The writing program uses strategies from the Hochman Method, also known as Teaching Basic Writing Skills. Math is taught using the Multisensory Math approach, developed by Marilyn Zecher.

Jewish learning is part of Shefa's daily program in all grades. Judaic Studies is conducted primarily in English. The school does not treat dual-language Hebrew proficiency as a necessity, since language is an area of difficulty for many students and learning two languages simultaneously can interfere with the acquisition of either one. Because of this, the school typically begins teaching Hebrew language at 4th or 5th grade, though Hebrew words and songs are integrated into prayer and Judaic Studies from the beginning.

The school includes an arts course as part of its core curriculum in addition to electives and arts integrated into academic subjects to enrich the teaching of history, Judaic Studies, and the culture of Israel and the Jewish people. Working artists, such as Israeli artist Hanoch Piven, have collaborated with the school by visiting to work with students.

In addition to physical education, visual and performance arts, the school also focuses on social–emotional learning and community service projects. Field trips and visits are made to local New York City sites, such as galleries and museums.

Some students meet with therapists during elective periods. The school's faculty includes speech-language pathologists, an occupational therapist and psychologist and social workers. These professionals consult and collaborate with teachers, and also meet with small groups of students during elective periods.

As they approach graduation, 8th grade students are coached and guided as they apply for mainstream Jewish and secular high schools, including how to write personal essays, and succeed in interviews and placement tests.

== The Shefa Center ==
The Shefa Center hosts trainings and meetings for educators from other day schools to learn best practices for educating children with learning challenges. The center also provides a consultation, coaching, teacher residency to Jewish educators learning how to teach students in a specialized educational setting.

== Campus ==
The Shefa School is currently located at 40 East 29th Street in Manhattan. In addition to classrooms and break-out spaces for small group learning, the campus also includes facilities for STEM programs. It was designed by HLW International. In order to support the build-out of the new space and the school's expansion in 2016, the board of trustees raised $6 million in a capital campaign.

=== New campus ===
In August 2021, the school announced that it was moving to a larger campus, which would expand the school's size to 75,000 sq. ft. The Shefa School purchased a 99-year ground lease for a 12-story building at 17 West 60th Street for $49.5 million. To help fund the lease and renovation of the new campus, the school launched the Sowing the Seeds of Abundance fundraising campaign, with the initial goal of raising $20 million.

Planned renovations for the new building include construction of new classrooms, facilities such as a gym and cafeteria, gathering spaces for programming and celebrations, and an outdoor playspace on the roof. The move and renovations are set to be completed in the spring of 2024.
