= Or Eitan =

Israeli basketball player

Or Eitan אור איתן
Personal information
- Born: November 9, 1981 (age 45) Israel
- Listed height: 6 ft 4 in (1.93 m)
- Position: Forward

Career highlights
- Israeli Basketball Premier League Quintet (2006)

Or Eitan (Hebrew: אור איתן; born November 9, 1981) is an Israeli former basketball player. He was named to the 2006 Israeli Basketball Premier League Quintet.

== Biography ==
He was born in Israel. Eitan is 6 ft 4 in (193 cm) tall.

Eitan played the forward position. He played for Cholet Basket, Hapoel Gilboa Galil, Hapoel Tel Aviv, Elitzur Ashkelon, and Maccabi Rishon LeZion. He was named to the 2006 Israeli Basketball Premier League Quintet.
