= Doron Shefa =

Israeli basketball player

Doron Shefa דורון שפע
Personal information
- Born: October 3, 1961 (age 65)
- Listed height: 6 ft 5 in (1.96 m)
- Position: Guard/forward

Career highlights
- Israeli Basketball Premier League Quintet (1991)

Doron Shefa (Hebrew: דורון שפע; born October 3, 1961) is an Israeli former basketball player. He played the guard and forward positions. He was named to the Israeli Basketball Premier League Quintet in 1991.

== Biography ==
Shefa is 6 ft 5 in (1.96 m) tall.

He played for Hapoel Jerusalem, Hapoel Gilboa/Afula, Maccabi Haifa, and Hapoel Holon. Shefa was named to the Israeli Basketball Premier League Quintet in 1991. He is 11th all-time in career points in the Israel Basketball Premier League, with 5,715.

Shefa competed for the Israel men's national basketball team in the 1986 FIBA World Championship for Men, 1987 FIBA European Championship for Men, and 1992 European Olympic Qualifying Tournament for Men.
