= Language-based learning disability =

Type of learning disability

Language-based learning disabilities or LBLD are "heterogeneous" neurological differences that can affect skills such as listening, reasoning, speaking, reading, writing, and math calculations. It is also associated with movement, coordination, and direct attention. LBLD is not usually identified until the child reaches school age. Most people with this disability find it hard to communicate, to express ideas efficiently and what they say may be ambiguous and hard to understand It is a neurological difference. It is often hereditary, and is frequently associated to specific language problems.

There are two types of learning disabilities: non-verbal, which includes disabilities from psychomotor difficulties to dyscalculia, and verbal, language based.

== Symptoms ==
LBLD consists of dyscalculia which comprises the reading of numbers sequentially, learning the time table, and telling time; dyslexia; and difficulties associated with written language such as trouble learning new vocabulary, letters and alphabets. Auditory processing disorders can cause trouble understanding questions and following directions, understanding and remembering the details of a story's plot or a classroom lecture, learning words to songs and rhymes, telling left from right, and having a hard time with reading and writing . Difficulties associated with reading and spoken language involve trouble understanding questions and following directions, understanding and retaining the details of a story's plot or a classroom lecture, nonword repetition, learning words to songs and rhymes, and identifying the sounds that correspond to letters, which makes learning to read difficult Difficulties associated with motor skills include difficulty telling left from right which is part of motor incoordination, visual perceptual problems, and memory problem

== Prevalence ==
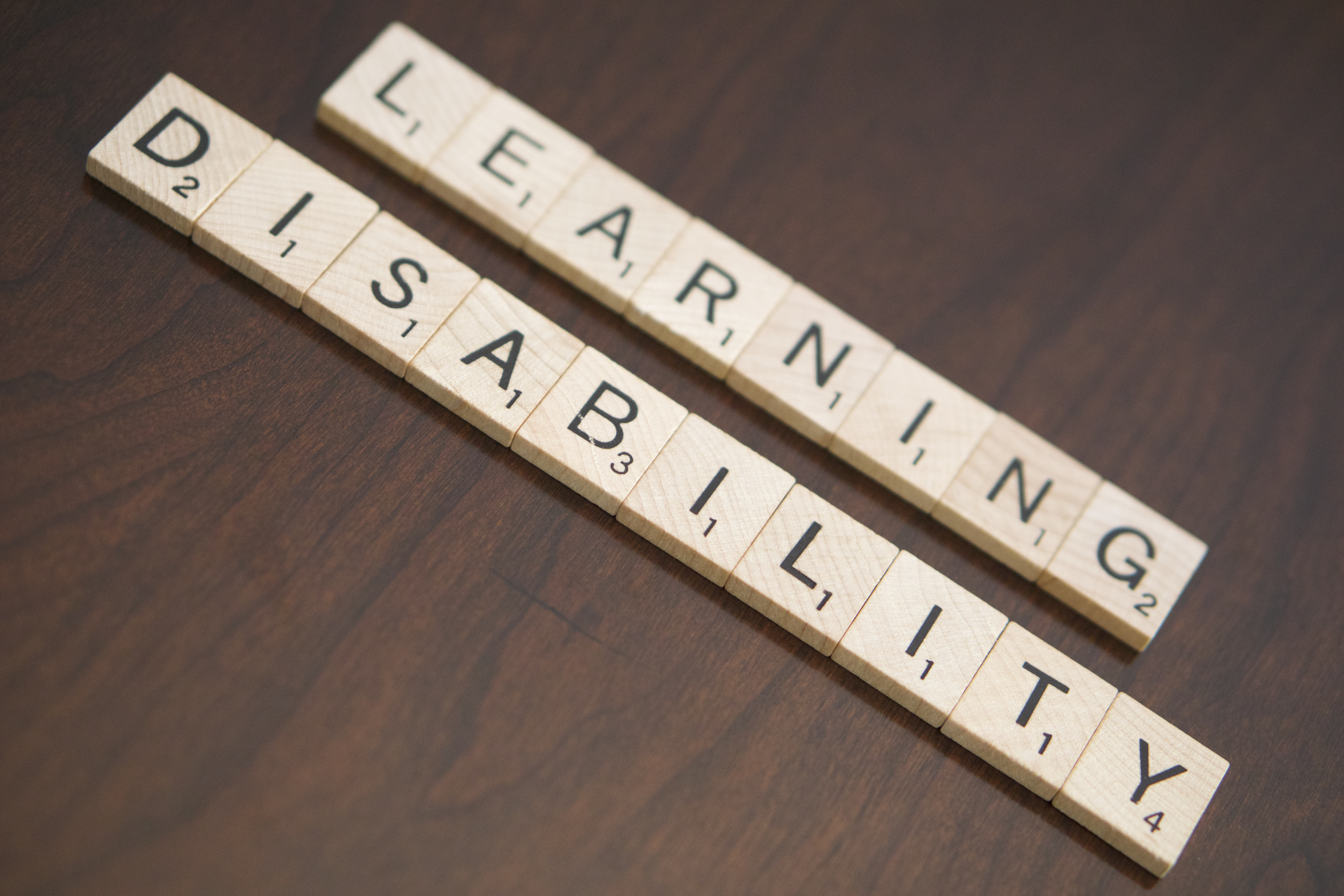
Learning disability word tile

Language-based learning disabilities (LBLD) are commonly diagnosed in schools, when typical developmental milestones have surpassed without progress. Educational instructors may notice developmental delays in students and chose to evaluate them using the Curriculum-based measurement (CBM). Although various research has been conducted, determining the prevalence of LBLD is difficult, affecting approximating every 1 in 10 children. Of the students with specific learning disabilities receiving special education services, 70–80% have a discrepancy in reading. LBLD significantly affect one's ability to partake in accurate reading comprehension, phonetic awareness and linguistic deficits. Some students will be diagnosed with LBLD during the duration of their primary education, whereas others may not recognize their language incompetencies until late adolescence. Language-based learning disabilities are not a new phenomenon, however prevalence and diagnoses have developed through investigation and research.

== Diagnosis ==
A speech-language pathologist (SLP), psychologist, social worker, and sometimes neurologist work together or individually to find the proper diagnosis for children with LBLD. Additionally, they evaluate speaking, listening, reading, and written language for children who have LBLD.

- SLPs evaluate the child's comprehension skills, and the child's ability to follow verbal and written directions. Also, they look for responsiveness, and see if the child recognizes familiar signs or holds a book correctly and they look for whether the child knows and/or writes letters, and names.
- Social workers obtain literacy history from the home, and then observe the child during classroom activities, they look for social interactions.
- Psychologists review a child's phonological memory by having him or her repeat series of words, numbers, letters, and sounds. They also look for response from the child to environmental and social factors.
- Neurologists look for motor skills, brain functions which include visual and auditory perception.

=== Dyslexia ===
Dyslexia is a common language-based learning disability. Dyslexia can affect reading fluency, decoding, reading comprehension, recall, writing, spelling, and sometimes speech and can exist along with other related disorders. The greatest difficult those with the disorder have is with spoken and the written word. These issues present pertain but are not limited to:

- Expressing ideas clearly, as if the words needed are on the tip of the tongue but won't come out.
- Letters and numbers
- Learning the alphabet
- Mixing up the order of numbers that are a part of math calculations
- Spelling
- Memorizing the times tables
- Telling time

== Prognosis ==
LBLD can be an enduring problem. Some people might experience overlapping learning disabilities that make improvement problematic. Others with single disabilities often show more improvement. Most subjects can achieve literacy via coping mechanisms and education.

== Treatment ==
Special education classes are the primary treatment. These classes focus on activities that sustain growth in language skills. The foundation of this treatment is repetition of oral, reading and writing activities. Usually the SLP, psychologist and the teacher work together with the children in small groups in the class room. Another treatment is looking at a child's needs through the Individual Education Plan (IEP). In this program teachers and parents work together to monitor the progress of the child's comprehensive, verbal, written, social, and motor skills in school and in the home. Then the child goes through different assessments to determine his/her level. The level that the child is placed in will determine the class size, number of teachers, and the need for therapy.

== See also ==
- Auditory processing disorder
- Developmental verbal dyspraxia
- Specific language impairment
