= EuroCup Basketball individual statistics =

EuroCup Basketball individual statistics are the individual stats leaders of the European-wide 2nd-tier level league, the EuroCup. The EuroCup is the European-wide league that is one tier level below the top-tier level EuroLeague.

== EuroCup Basketball season by season individual stats leaders ==
=== Points per game ===
- 2002–03 (United States) / (Israel) Jamie Arnold (KRKA Novo Mesto): 20.25 (in 16 games)
- 2003–04 (United States) Rasheed Brokenborough (Superfund Bulls Kapfenberg): 26.55 (in 9 games)
- 2004–05 (Bulgaria) Todor Stoykov (Lukoil Academic Sofia): 23.92 (in 12 games)
- 2005–06 (United States) Horace Jenkins (Hapoel Jerusalem): 20.44 (in 16 games)
- 2006–07 (Serbia) / (Greece) Milan Gurović (Crvena Zvezda Belgrade): 25.86 (in 14 games)
- 2007–08 (United States) / (Austria) De'Teri Mayes (Allianz Swans Gmunden): 21.1 (in 10 games)
- 2008–09 (United States) Khalid El-Amin (BC Azovmash): 17.91 (in 11 games)
- 2009–10 (United States) / (North Macedonia) Darius Washington (Galatasaray Café Crown): 21.64 (in 11 games)
- 2010–11 (United States) / (Azerbaijan) Jaycee Carroll (CB Gran Canaria): 19.00 (in 12 games)
- 2011–12 (United States) Ramel Curry (BC Donetsk): 16.43 (in 14 games)
- 2012–13 (United States Virgin Islands) / (Puerto Rico) Walter Hodge (Stelmet Zielona Góra): 21.17 (in 12 games)
- 2013–14 (United States) Errick McCollum (Panionios): 20.19 (in 16 games)
- 2014–15 (United States) Randy Culpepper (Krasny Oktyabr Volgograd): 19.15 (in 13 games)
- 2015–16 (United States) Keith Langford (UNICS Kazan): 19.69 (in 16 games)
- 2016–17 (Russia) Alexey Shved (Khimki): 22.14 (in 14 games)

=== Rebounds per game ===
- 2002–03 (United States) K'zell Wesson (Cholet Basket): 12.7 (in 10 games)
- 2003–04 (Netherlands) Geert Hammink (RheinEnergie Cologne): 11.5 (in 12 games)
- 2004–05 (United States) Chris Ensminger (GHP Bamberg): 10.67 (in 9 games)
- 2005–06 (United States) Mario Austin (Hapoel Jerusalem): 9.44 (in 16 games)
- 2006–07 (United States) / (France) Tariq Kirksay (SLUC Nancy): 9.58 (in 12 games)
- 2007–08 (Romania) Virgil Carutasu (CSU Asesoft Ploiesti): 10 (in 9 games)
- 2008–09 (Bulgaria) Deyan Ivanov (KK Zadar): 8.56 (in 9 games)
- 2009–10 (United States) James Augustine (CB Gran Canaria): 7.43 (in 14 games)
- 2010–11 (Poland) Maciej Lampe (UNICS Kazan): 8.06 (in 16 games)
- 2011–12 (United States) / (North Macedonia) Jeremiah Massey (PBC Lokomotiv-Kuban): 8.36 (in 14 games)
- 2012–13 (United States) John Bryant (Ratiopharm Ulm): 9.00 (in 13 games)
- 2013–14 (Montenegro) Vladimir Golubović (Aykon TED Ankara): 10.10 (in 20 games)
- 2014–15 (United States) Sharrod Ford (Paris Levallois): 8.85 (in 20 games)
- 2015–16 (France) Adrien Moerman (Banvit Bandirma): 8.56 (in 18 games)
- 2016–17 (United States) Drew Gordon (Lietuvos rytas Vilnius): 9.57 (in 14 games)

=== Assists per game ===
- 2002–03 (United States) Richard "Scooter" Barry (Cholet Basket): 5.3 (in 10 games)
- 2003–04 (Croatia) Ivan Tomas (KK Zagreb): 4.78 (in 9 games)
- 2004–05 (Croatia) Damir Mulaomerović (PAOK Thessaloniki): 7.78 (in 9 games)
- 2005–06 (United States) Lamont Jones (Lukoil Academic Sofia): 6.3 (in 10 games)
- 2006–07 (New Zealand) Mark Dickel (Anwil Wloclawek): 5.67 (in 9 games)
- 2007–08 (United States) / (Montenegro) Omar Cook (Crvena Zvezda Belgrade): 6.14 (in 14 games)
- 2008–09 (United States) Khalid El-Amin (BC Azovmash): 5.27 (in 11 games)
- 2009–10 (Croatia) Marko Popović (UNICS Kazan): 4.75 (in 12 games)
- 2010–11 (United States) / (Croatia) Dontaye Draper (KK Cedevita Zagreb): 6.21 (in 14 games)
- 2011–12 (United States) DaShaun Wood (Alba Berlin): 5.42 (in 12 games)
- 2012–13 (Greece) Nick Calathes (PBC Lokomotiv-Kuban): 6.65 (in 17 games)
- 2013–14 (Serbia) Marko Marinović (Radnički Kragujevac): 8.56 (in 16 games)
- 2014–15 (United States) Mike Green (Paris Levallois): 7.35 (in 20 games)
- 2015–16 (Andorra) / (Spain) Quino Colom (UNICS Kazan): 7.61 (in 18 games)
- 2016–17 (Serbia) Stefan Marković (Zenit Saint Petersburg): 9.14 (in 14 games)

=== Steals per game ===
- 2002–03 (United States) Joe Spinks (Ricoh Astronauts Amsterdam): 4.1 (in 10 games)
- 2003–04 (United States) Joe Spinks (Demon Astronauts Amsterdam): 4.3 (in 10 games)
- 2004–05 (United States) Kevin Rice (Darussafaka Istanbul): 4.2 (in 10 games)
- 2005–06 (United States) David Hawkins (Virtus Lottomatica Roma): 3.0 (in 14 games)
- 2006–07 (United States) / (France) Tariq Kirksay (SLUC Nancy): 2.67 (in 12 games)
- 2007–08 (United States) Chris Williams (Turk Telekom Ankara): 2.67 (in 12 games)
- 2008–09 (United States) Terrell Lyday (UNICS Kazan): 2.63 (in 8 games)
- 2009–10 (United States) Terrell Lyday (UNICS Kazan): 2.36 (in 11 games)
- 2010–11 (United States) / (France) Tariq Kirksay (CB Sevilla): 2.25 (in 16 games)
- 2011–12 (United States) Patrick Beverley (Spartak Saint Petersburg): 1.94 (in 16 games)
- 2012–13 (United States) Tywain McKee (BC Triumph Lyubertsy): 2.36 (in 11 games)
- 2013–14 (United States) / (Kosovo) Justin Doellman (Valencia BC): 1.92 (in 24 games)
- 2014–15 (United States) Brad Wanamaker (Brose Baskets Bamberg): 2.11 (in 18 games)
- 2015–16 (United States) Rocky Trice (MHP RIESEN Ludwigsburg): 2.20 (in 15 games)
- 2016–17 (Argentina) Facundo Campazzo (UCAM Murcia): 2.23 (in 13 games)

=== Blocks per game ===
- 2002–03 (United States) Andre Riddick (Spirou Charleroi): 2.33 (in 12 games)
- 2003–04 (United States) / (Bulgaria) Priest Lauderdale (Lukoil Academic Sofia): 2.73 (in 11 games)
- 2004–05 (United States) Andre Riddick (Spirou Charleroi): 2.71 (in 14 games)
- 2005–06 (Serbia) Mile Ilić (FMP Zeleznik Belgrade) & (United States) David Simon (Lukoil Academic Sofia): 1.5 (in 12 games)
- 2006–07 (United States) Sharrod Ford (Alba Berlin): 2.50 (in 12 games)
- 2007–08 (Nigeria) Akin Akingbala (BK Ventspils): 2.72 (in 11 games)
- 2008–09 (Ukraine) Serhiy Lishchuk (BC Azovmash): 1.55 (in 11 games)
- 2009–10 (Ukraine) Serhiy Lishchuk (Power Electronics Valencia): 1.47 (in 15 games)
- 2010–11 (United States) Bryant Dunston (Aris B.C.): 1.56 (in 9 games)
- 2011–12 (United States) Sam Muldrow (Aris B.C.): 2.25 (in 12 games)
- 2012–13 (United States) / (Azerbaijan) Chuck Davis (Banvit B.K.): 1.33 (in 12 games)
- 2013–14 (Belarus) / (Russia) Artsiom Parakhouski (Hapoel Jerusalem): 1.74 (in 19 games)
- 2014–15 (Cape Verde) Walter Tavares (Gran Canaria Las Palmas): 1.91 (in 23 games)
- 2015–16 (United States) / (Israel) D'or Fischer (Hapoel Jerusalem): 1.64 (in 14 games)
- 2016–17 (Slovenia) Mirza Begić (Cedevita): 1.29 (in 14 games)

=== Performance index rating (PIR) ===
- 2002–03 (Australia) Chris Anstey (Ural Great Perm): 24.08 (in 12 games)
- 2003–04 (United States) / (Bulgaria) Priest Lauderdale (Lukoil Academic Sofia): 28.0 (in 11 games)
- 2004–05 (United States) Fred House (Lietuvos Rytas): 23.90 (in 10 games)
- 2005–06 (United States) Mario Austin (Hapoel Jerusalem): 22.63 (in 16 games)
- 2006–07 (Serbia) / (Greece) Milan Gurović (Crvena Zvezda Belgrade): 25.50 (in 14 games)
- 2007–08 (United States) / (Bulgaria) Willie Deane (Lukoil Academic): 20.92 (in 13 games)
- 2008–09 (United States) Chuck Eidson (Lietuvos rytas Vilnius): 21.27 (in 15 games)
- 2009–10 (United States) / (North Macedonia) Darius Washington (Galatasaray Café Crown): 24.45 (in 11 games)
- 2010–11 (United States) / (Croatia) Dontaye Draper (KK Cedevita Zagreb): 20.93 (in 14 games)
- 2011–12 (United States) / (North Macedonia) Jeremiah Massey (PBC Lokomotiv-Kuban): 19.86 (in 14 games)
- 2012–13 (United States) Tywain McKee (BC Triumph Lyubertsy): 23.64 (in 11 games)
- 2013–14 (Montenegro) Vladimir Golubović (Aykon TED Ankara): 26.65 (in 20 games)
- 2014–15 (United States) Derrick Brown (Lokomotiv Kuban Krasnodar): 19.78 (in 18 games)
- 2015–16 (United States) Jeff Brooks (Avtodor Saratov): 21.31 (in 13 games)
- 2016–17 (Russia) Alexey Shved (Khimki): 22.00 (in 14 games)

=== EuroCup Basketball all-time individual stats leaders ===
| | Average | | Totals | |
|---|---|---|---|---|
| Points | (Serbia) Igor Rakočević | 19.05 | (Montenegro) Bojan Dubljević | 1,217 |
| Rebounds | (Montenegro) Vladimir Golubović | 8.39 | (Belarus) Vladimir Veremeenko | 609 |
| Assists | (Montenegro) Omar Cook | 6.44 | (Serbia) Stefan Marković | 491 |
| Steals | (United States) Jerry McCullough | 2.82 | (United States) Mire Chatman | 167 |
| Blocks | (United States) Andre Riddick | 1.77 | (United States) Andre Riddick | 147 |
| index ratings | (Turkey) Michael Wright | 22.14 | (United States) Mire Chatman | 1,472 |

=== EuroCup Basketball highest attendance records ===
- 24,232 attendance for Red Star Belgrade, 79-70, Budivelnyk Kyiv, at Kombank Arena, Belgrade, on March 26, 2014.
- 22,736 attendance for Red Star Belgrade, 63-52, UNICS Kazan, at Kombank Arena, Belgrade, on April 2, 2014.

== EuroCup Basketball individual performances ==
=== EuroCup Basketball individual highs ===
==== Points ====
1. (United States) Randy Duck (Brighton Bears) 49 pts vs. Cholet Basket (12/23 2pt, 4/10 3pt, 13/17 FT) (in 2003–04 season)
2. (United States) Bobby Brown (Alba Berlin) 44 pts vs. KK Bosna (8/18 2pt, 4/11 3pt, 16/19 FT) (in 2007–08 season)
3. (United States) Mire Chatman (Besiktas) 43 pts @ Hemofarm (12/14 2pt, 1/5 3pt, 16/18 FT) (in 2010–11 season)
4. (Greece) Loukas Mavrokefalidis (AEK Athens) 42 pts vs Krasny Oktyabr (12/18 2pt, 2/2 3pt, 12/15 FT) (in 2015–16 season)
5. (Slovakia) Radoslav Rančík (Galatasaray) 39 pts vs. Azovmash (14/21 2pt, 2/6 3pt, 5/5 FT) (in 2009–10 season)
6. (United States) Mike Penberthy (Pompea Napoli) 39 pts vs. Telekom Bonn (4/10 2pt, 7/10 3pt, 10/12 FT) (in 2004–05 season)
7. (United States) Michael Watson (Slask Wroclaw) 39 pts @ Crvena Zvezda (7/13 2pt, 4/11 3pt, 13/14 FT) (in 2004–05 season)
8. (United States) Cordell Henry (Ovarense Aerosoles) 38 pts @ Köln 99ers (7/9 2pt, 5/10 3pt, 9/10 FT) (in 2007–08 season)
9. (United States) Malcolm Delaney (Budivelnyk Kyiv) 38 pts vs. Uxue Bilbao (3/4 2pt, 6/9 3pt, 14/16 FT) (in 2012–13 season)
10. (Serbia and Montenegro) Ivan Koljević (Buducnost) 38 pts vs. PAOK (4/7 2pt, 5/8 3pt, 15/15 FT) (in 2004–05 season)
11. (United States) Fred House (Lietuvos rytas Vilnius) 38 pts @ Slask Wroclaw (7/9 2pt, 5/6 3pt, 9/9 FT) (in 2004–05 season)

==== Rebounds ====
1. (Greece) Lazaros Papadopoulos (Dynamo Moscow) 22 rebs @ Aris Thessaloniki (in 2004–05 season)
2. (Bosnia and Herzegovina) Aleksandar Radojević (Telekom Bonn) 20 rebs vs. Gravelines Dunkerque (in 2002–03 season)
3. (Romania) Virgil Carutasu (CSU Asesoft) 18 rebs vs. Hemofarm Stada (in 2007–08 season)
4. (Croatia) Mate Skelin (Lukoil Academic) 18 rebs vs. Montepaschi (in 2006–07 season)
5. (United States) K'zell Wesson (Cholet Basket) 18 rebs vs. KK Zadar (in 2002–03 season)
6. (Australia) Chris Anstey (Ural Great) 18 rebs @ Gravelines Dunkerque (in 2002–03 season)
7. (United States) Shawnelle Scott (Varese) 18 rebs @ KK Zadar (in 2002–03 season)
8. (United States) Jason Forrestal (Superfund Kapfenberg) 18 rebs @ Auna Gran Canaria (in 2003–04 season)
9. (United States) Jason Forrestal (Superfund Kapfenberg) 18 rebs vs. RheinEnergie (in 2003–04 season)
10. (Latvia) Troy Ostler (Liege Basket) 18 rebs vs. EiffelTowers (in 2004–05 season)
11. (France) Tariq Kirksay (SLUC Nancy) 18 rebs vs. Lietuvos rytas Vilnius (in 2006–07 season)

==== Assists ====
1. (United States) / (Montenegro) Omar Cook (Budućnost Podgorica) 16 vs. Ventspils (in 2014–15 season)
2. (United States) / (Italy) Travis Diener (Dinamo Sassari) 15 asts @ Crvena Zvezda Telekom (in 2012–13 season)
3. (Serbia) Marko Marinović (Radnički Kragujevac) 15 asts vs. Neptūnas Klaipėda (in 2013–14 season)
4. (Greece) Nick Calathes (Lokomotiv Kuban) 14 asts @ Trefl Sopot (in 2012–13 season)
5. Roko Ukić (Croatia Osiguranje Split) 14 asts @ Ionikos NF (in 2003–04 season)
6. (Puerto Rico) Christian Dalmau (Besiktas ColaTurka) 14 asts vs. Ovarense Aerosoles (in 2007–08 season)
7. (Latvia) Kristaps Valters (Joventut) 14 asts vs. Unics (in 2009–10 season)
8. (Croatia) Damir Mulaomerović (PAOK) 13 asts @ Gravelines Dunkerque (in 2004–05 season)
9. (Israel) Doron Sheffer (Hapoel Jerusalem) 13 asts vs. Virtus Bologna (in 2003–04 season)
10. (United States) / (Bulgaria) Willie Deane (Lukoil Academic) 13 asts @ Artland Dragons (in 2007–08 season)
11. (United States) Darrel Mitchell (Elan Chalon) 12 asts vs. Akasvayu Girona (in 2007–08 season)
12. (Croatia) Damir Mulaomerović (PAOK) 12 asts @ Cholet Basket (in 2004–05 season)
13. (United States) Curtis McCants (Croatia Osiguranje Split) 12 asts @ Cholet Basket (in 2003–04 season)
14. (United States) Mire Chatman (Besiktas) 12 asts @ Le Havre (in 2008–09 season)
15. (United States) / (Belgium) Justin Hamilton (Spirou Charleroi) 12 asts @ Galatasaray Cafe Crown (in 2007–08 season)
16. (United States) / (Bulgaria) Willie Deane (Lukoil Academic) 12 asts vs. Artland Dragons (in 2007–08 season)

==== Steals ====
1. (United States) Jerry McCullough (Varese) 11 stls vs. Crvena Zvezda (in 2003–04 season)
2. (Israel) Dror Hajaj (Hapoel Jerusalem) 11 stls vs. Lukoil Academic (in 2006–07 season)
3. (Italy) Valerio Spinelli (Pompea Napoli) 10 stls @ Crvena Zvezda (in 2004–05 season)
4. (United States) Kevin Rice (Darussafaka Istanbul) 10 stls @ Pivovarna Lasko (in 2004–05 season)
5. (United States) Brandon Gay (Antwerp Giants) 8 stls vs. Buducnost Podgorica (in 2007–08 season)
6. (Italy) Andrea Meneghin (Varese) 8 stls vs. Caprabo Lleida (in 2002–03 season)
7. (Spain) Jaume Comas (Caprabo Lleida) 8 stls @ Ricoh Astronauts (in 2002–03 season)
8. (United States) Fred House (Lietuvos rytas Vilnius) 8 stls @ Crvena Zvezda (in 2004–05 season)
9. (United States) William Avery (Hapoel Jerusalem) 8 stls @ Varese (in 2004–05 season)
10. (United States) / (Bosnia and Herzegovina) Henry Domercant (Dynamo Moscow) 8 stls vs. Beghelli Bologna (in 2007–08 season)
11. (United States) Kevin Rice (Darussafaka Istanbul) 8 stls vs. Pivovarna Lasko (in 2004–05 season)
12. (United States) Patrick Lee (Debreceni Vadkakasok) 8 stls vs. Buducnost Podgorica (in 2004–05 season)
13. (United States) David Hawkins (Lottomatica Roma) 8 stls vs. Dynamo Moscow (in 2005–06 season)

==== Blocks ====
1. (United States) Ken Johnson (Benetton Fribourg) 8 blocks vs. Buducnost Podgorica (in 2007–08 season)
2. (United States) Andre Riddick (Spirou Charleroi) 8 blocks @ Alba Berlin (in 2004–05 season)
3. (Nigeria) Akin Akingbala (BK Ventspils) 7 blocks vs. FMP Zeleznik (in 2007–08 season)
4. (United States) Jarvis Varnado (Hapoel Jerusalem) 7 blocks vs. Donetsk (in 2011–12 season)
5. (United States) Andre Riddick (Spirou Charleroi) 7 blocks @ Caprabo Lleida (in 2002–03 season)
6. (Lithuania) Robertas Javtokas (Lietuvos rytas Vilnius) 7 blocks @ Brighton Bears (in 2003–04 season)
7. (Lithuania) Robertas Javtokas (Lietuvos rytas Vilnius) 7 blocks @ Croatia Osiguranje Split (in 2003–04 season)
8. (United States) Erik Nelson (EiffelTowers) 7 blocks vs. Le Mans (in 2003–04 season)
9. (Latvia) Mārtiņš Skirmants (BK Ventspils) 7 blocks @ EiffelTowers (in 2004–05 season)
10. (France) Cyril Akpomedah (Cholet Basket) 7 blocks vs. Croatia Osiguranje Split (in 2003–04 season)

==== index ratings ====
1. (Greece) Loukas Mavrokefalidis (AEK Athens) 55 vs. Krasny Oktyabr Volgograd (in 2015–16 season)
2. (United States) / (Bulgaria) Priest Lauderdale (Lukoil Academic) 55 vs. KK Zagreb (in 2003–04 season)
3. (United States) Mire Chatman (Besiktas) 53 @ Hemofarm (in 2010–11 season)
4. (United States) Fred House (Lietuvos rytas Vilnius) 50 @ Slask Wroclaw (in 2004–05 season)
5. (United States) / (Turkey) Michael Wright (Turk Telekom) 49 @ Siauliai (in 2007–08 season)
6. (United States) Rasheed Brokenborough (Superfund Kapfenberg) 48 vs. Atlas Belgrade (in 2003–04 season)
7. (United States) Devin Smith (Benetton) 47 @ Alba Berlin (in 2010–11 season)
8. (United States) Malcolm Delaney (Budivelnyk Kyiv) 47 vs. Uxue Bilbao (in 2012–13 season)
9. (United States) / (Lebanon) Jackson Vroman (Akasvayu Girona) 47 @ Hanzevast Capitals (in 2007–08 season)
10. (United States) Cordell Henry (Ovarense Aerosoles) 46 @ Köln 99ers (in 2007–08 season)
11. (Serbia and Montenegro) Ivan Koljević (Buducnost Podgorica) 46 vs. PAOK Thessaloniki (in 2004–05 season)
12. (United States) / (North Macedonia) Ryan Stack (Aris Thessaloniki) 46 vs. Alba Berlin (in 2005–06 season)

=== Triple-Doubles ===
1. (Bulgaria) Todor Stoykov (Lukoil Academic) 33 pts, 13 rebs, 10 asts vs. KK Zagreb (in 2003–04 season)
2. (Israel) Meir Tapiro (Hapoel Jerusalem) 16 pts, 11 rebs, 10 asts vs. FMP Zeleznik (in 2006–07 season)
3. (Bosnia and Herzegovina) Elvir Ovčina (Telindus Oostende) 12 pts, 11 rebs, 10 asts vs. Dynamo Moscow (in 2007–08 season)
4. (France) Pascal Perrier-David (Benetton Fribourg) 13 pts, 10 rebs, 10 asts @ Hapoel Galil Elyon (in 2007–08 season)
5. (United States) / (Venezuela) Donta Smith (Maccabi Haifa) 18 pts, 16 rebs, 10 asts @ VEF Rīga (in 2013-2014 season)
6. (United States) Courtney Fortson (Banvit B.K.) 13 pts, 11 rebs, 10 asts vs. Aris Thessaloniki (in 2015–16 season)
7. (Andorra) / (Spain) Quino Colom (BC Unics) 15 pts, 11 rebs, 13 asts vs. Buducnost VOLI Podgorica (in 2015–16 season)

== 2002–03 ==
Points per game:

1. Jamie Arnold (Krka Novo Mesto): 20.2
2. Nate Erdmann (Generali Group Trieste): 19.8
3. Marko Popović (KK Zadar): 19.5
4. Joe Spinks (Ricoh Astronauts Amsterdam): 19
5. Chris Anstey (Ural Great Perm): 18.9
6. Demetrius Alexander (Snaidero Amatori Udine): 18.7
7. Eddie Shannon (Ural Great Perm): 17.9
8. Richard Scott (Jabones Pardo Fuenlabrada): 17.8
9. Boris Gorenc (Pallacanestro Varese (Metis) Varese): 17.6
10. Kenyan Weaks (Pivovarna Laško): 17.5
11. Aleksandar Nađfeji (Telekom Baskets Bonn): 17.4

Assists per game:

1. Richard "Scooter" Barry (Cholet Basket): 5.3
2. Dejan Tomašević (Pamesa Valencia): 4.7
3. Terrence Rencher (Telekom Baskets Bonn): 3.9
4. Stanley Jackson (Elan Chalon): 3.7
5. Ivan Tomeljak (Ricoh Astronauts Amsterdam): 3.6
6. Travis Conlan (Opel Frankfurt Skyliners): 3.6
7. Vladimir Bogojević (RheinEnergie Cologne): 3.6
8. Ivica Maric (Generali Group Trieste): 3.4
9. Eddie Shannon (Ural Great Perm): 3.3
10. Mladen Erjavec (KK Zadar): 3.28
11. Aleksandar Ćapin (Krka Novo Mesto): 3.22

Rebounds per game:

1. K'zell Wesson (Cholet Basket): 12.7
2. Chris Anstey (Ural Great Perm): 9.5
3. Shawnelle Scott (Pallacanestro Varese (Metis) Varese): 8.88
4. Žan Tabak (DKV Joventut Badalona): 8.83
5. Jamie Arnold (Krka Novo Mesto): 8.5
6. Joe Spinks (Ricoh Astronauts Amsterdam): 8.4
7. Felipe Reyes (Estudiantes (Adecco) Madrid): 8.1
8. Aleksandar Radojević (Telekom Baskets Bonn): 8
9. Michael Ruffin (CE Lleida Bàsquet (Caprabo) Lleida): 7.8
10. Siniša Kelečević (Pallacanestro Trieste (Generali Group) Trieste): 7.0
11. Christophe Beghin (Telindus Oostende): 6.8

Steals per game:

1. Joe Spinks (Ricoh Astronauts Amsterdam): 4.1
2. Andrea Meneghin (Pallacanestro Varese (Metis) Varese): 2.7
3. Marko Milič (Eurocellulari Roseto Basket): 2.6
4. Travis Conlan (Opel Frankfurt Skyliners): 2.3
5. Boris Gorenc (Pallacanestro Varese (Metis) Varese): 2.23
6. Nate Erdmann (Pallacanestro Trieste (Generali Group) Trieste): 2.22

Blocks per game:

1. Andre Riddick (Spirou Charleroi): 2.3
2. Maceo Baston (DKV Joventut Badalona): 2.1
3. Michael Ruffin (CE Lleida Bàsquet (Caprabo) Lleida): 1.85
4. Chris Anstey (Ural Great Perm): 1.83
5. Mario Kasun (Opel Frankfurt Skyliners): 1.7
6. Ognjen Aškrabić (KK Železnik (FMP) Belgrade): 1.3

Average index rating:

1. Chris Anstey (Ural Great Perm): 24.0
2. Jamie Arnold (Krka Novo Mesto): 23.6
3. Maceo Baston (DKV Joventut Badalona): 23.3
4. Ognjen Aškrabić (KK Železnik (FMP) Belgrade): 21.14
5. Joe Spinks (Ricoh Astronauts Amsterdam): 21.1
6. Eddie Shannon (Ural Great Perm): 20.41
7. K'zell Wesson (Cholet Basket): 20.4
8. Felipe Reyes (Estudiantes (Adecco) Madrid): 18.87
9. Marko Popović (KK Zadar): 18.81
10. Nate Erdmann (Pallacanestro Trieste (Generali Group) Trieste): 18.4
11. A. J. Bramlett (CE Lleida Bàsquet (Caprabo) Lleida): 18
12. Wálter Herrmann (Baloncesto Fuenlabrada (Jabones Pardo) Fuenlabrada): 18

== 2003–04 ==
Points per game:

1. Rasheed Brokenborough (Superfund Bulls Kapfenberg): 26.5
2. Will Solomon (Hapoel Jerusalem): 23.4
3. Randy Duck (Brighton Bears): 20.4
4. Vladimir Vuksanović (KK Novi Beograd (Atlas) Belgrade): 19.7
5. Igor Rakočević (Crvena Zvezda Belgrade): 19.3
6. Priest Lauderdale (Lukoil Academic Sofia): 19.2
7. Todor Stoykov (Lukoil Academic Sofia): 19.0
8. Mire Chatman (BK Ventspils): 19
9. Kendrick Warren (Brighton Bears): 18.9
10. Rimas Kaukėnas (Telekom Baskets Bonn): 18.7
11. Demond Mallet (BS|Energy Braunschweig): 18.3
12. Jamie Arnold (DKV Joventut Badalona): 18.2

Assists per game:

1. Ivan Tomas (KK Zagreb): 4.77
2. Elmer Bennett (Real Madrid): 4.52
3. Randy Duck (Brighton Bears): 4.5
4. Todor Stoykov (Lukoil Academic Sofia): 4.3
5. Tomas Pačėsas (Prokom Trefl Sopot): 4.25
6. Aaron Lucas (Lietuvos Rytas Vilnius): 4.21
7. Mire Chatman (BK Ventspils): 4.1
8. Terrence Rencher (RheinEnergie Cologne): 4
9. Shane Heal (Makedonikos BC): 4
10. Doron Sheffer (Hapoel Jerusalem): 3.94
11. Ryan Robertson (EiffelTowers Nijmegen): 3.9

Rebounds per game:

1. Geert Hammink (RheinEnergie Cologne): 11.5
2. Priest Lauderdale (Lukoil Academic Sofia): 11.2
3. Jason Forrestal (Superfund Bulls Kapfenberg): 10
4. Igor Perica (BCM Gravelines Dunkerque): 9.7
5. Kendrick Warren (Brighton Bears): 9.3
6. Axel Hervelle (Royal BC Verviers-Pepinster): 9.2
7. Mario Kasun (Opel Frankfurt Skyliners): 8.8
8. Rashon Turner (Le Mans Sarthe Basket): 8.3
9. Dejan Milojević (Budućnost Podgorica): 8.2
10. Robertas Javtokas (Lietuvos Rytas Vilnius): 8.0
11. Marcus Goree (CB Gran Canaria (Auna) Las Palmas): 8
12. Tomas Masiulis (Prokom Trefl Sopot): 7.9

Steals per game:

1. Joe Spinks (Demon Astronauts Amsterdam): 4.3
2. Jerry McCullough (Pallacanestro Varese (Metis) Varese): 3.7
3. Daniel Farabello (Pallacanestro Varese (Metis) Varese): 3.2
4. Mire Chatman (BK Ventspils): 3
5. Sergerio Gipson (Demon Astronauts Amsterdam): 2.7

Blocks per game:

1. Priest Lauderdale (Lukoil Academic Sofia): 2.7
2. Robertas Javtokas (Lietuvos Rytas Vilnius): 2.0
3. Fran Vázquez (CB Gran Canaria (Auna) Las Palmas): 2
4. Andre Riddick (Spirou Region Wallone Charleroi): 1.9
5. Tommy Smith (KK Split (Croatia Osiguranje) Split): 1.7

Average index rating:

1. Priest Lauderdale (Lukoil Academic Sofia): 28
2. Rasheed Brokenborough (Superfund Bulls Kapfenberg): 27.1
3. Will Solomon (Hapoel Jerusalem): 21.8
4. Mire Chatman (BK Ventspils): 21.7
5. Darius Hall (Royal BC Verviers-Pepinster): 21
6. Geert Hammink (RheinEnergie Cologne): 20.7
7. Lou Roe (Lucentum (Etosa) Alicante): 20.6
8. Tunji Awajobi (Hapoel Jerusalem): 20.4
9. Jerry McCullough (Pallacanestro Varese (Metis) Varese): 19.4
10. Dejan Milojević (Budućnost Podgorica): 18.77
11. Demond Mallet (BS|Energy Braunschweig): 18.7

== 2004–05 ==
Points per game:

1. Todor Stoykov (Lukoil Academic Sofia): 23.9
2. Mike Penberthy (Pompea Napoli): 22.1
3. Damir Mulaomerović (PAOK Thessaloniki): 20.7
4. Bill Edwards (RheinEnergie Cologne): 19.41
5. Fred House (Lietuvos Rytas Vilnius): 19.4
6. William Avery (Hapoel Jerusalem): 19.3
7. Marcus Faison (Spirou Charleroi): 19.28
8. Igor Rakočević (Pamesa Valencia): 18.5
9. Brent Wright (BK Ventspils): 18.2
10. Sani Bečirovič (Corimec Varese): 18
11. DeJuan Collins (Aris Egnatia Bank Thessaloniki): 18

Assists per game:

1. Damir Mulaomerović (PAOK Thessaloniki): 7.7
2. Kyle Hill (KK Zadar): 5.8
3. Laurent Sciarra (BCM Gravelines Dunkerque): 5.7
4. William Avery (Hapoel Jerusalem): 5.2
5. Lamont Jones (Lukoil Academic Sofia): 4.83
6. Cüneyt Erden (Darussafaka Istanbul): 4.8
7. Roderick Blakney (Maroussi Honda Athens): 4.61
8. Sani Bečirovič (Corimec Varese): 4.6
9. Jimail Ball (Cholet Basket): 4.45
10. Stanley Jackson (Elan Chalon): 4.4
11. Branko Milisavljević (Telekom Baskets Bonn): 4.22
12. Patrick Lee (Debreceni Vadkakasok): 4.2

Rebounds per game:

1. Chris Ensminger (GHP Bamberg): 10.6
2. Richard Mason Rocca (Pompea Napoli): 10.1
3. Mirsad Türkcan (Dynamo Moscow): 9.9
4. K'zell Wesson (BCM Gravelines Dunkerque): 9.4
5. Troy Ostler (Liege Basket): 8.77
6. Dejan Tomašević (Pamesa Valencia): 8.71
7. Michael Wright (Alba Berlin): 8.5
8. Andre Hutson (Makedonikos Kozani): 8
9. Lazaros Papadopoulos (Dynamo Moscow): 7.75
10. Thabo Sefolosha (Elan Chalon): 7.7
11. Damir Krupalija (Spirou Charleroi): 7.64
12. Leon Trimmingham (Hapoel Jerusalem): 7.6

Steals per game:

1. Kevin Rice (Darussafaka Istanbul): 4.2
2. Bojan Popović (KK Železnik (Reflex) Belgrade): 3.4
3. Fred House (Lietuvos Rytas Vilnius): 3.3
4. Daniel Farabello (Corimec Varese): 2.9
5. Andrew Wisniewski (Crvena Zvezda Belgrade): 2.8
6. Thabo Sefolosha (Elan Chalon): 2.5

Blocks per game:

1. Andre Riddick (Spirou Charleroi): 2.7
2. Slavko Vraneš (Buducnost Podgorica): 2.2
3. Cyril Akpomedah (Cholet Basket): 2.1
4. Venson Hamilton (DKV Joventut Badalona): 2.0
5. Mārtiņš Skirmants (BK Ventspils): 1.78
6. Grigorij Khizhnyak (Makedonikos Kozani): 1.72

Average index rating:

1. Fred House (Lietuvos Rytas Vilnius): 23.9
2. Damir Mulaomerović (PAOK Thessaloniki): 23.6
3. Mirsad Türkcan (Dynamo Moscow): 23.5
4. Todor Stoykov (Lukoil Academic Sofia): 22.8
5. Jimail Ball (Cholet Basket): 22.7
6. Brent Wright (BK Ventspils): 22.2
7. Michael Wright (Alba Berlin): 21.8
8. William Avery (Hapoel Jerusalem): 21.7
9. Cyril Akpomedah (Cholet Basket): 21.3
10. Lazaros Papadopoulos (Dynamo Moscow): 20.58
11. Milenko Topić (KK Hemofarm Vršac): 20.5

== 2005–06 ==
Points per game:

1. Horace Jenkins (Hapoel Jerusalem): 20.4
2. Lamont Jones (Lukoil Academic Sofia): 19.8
3. Todor Stoykov (Lukoil Academic Sofia): 19.5
4. Michael Wright (Besiktas ColaTurka Istanbul): 18.8
5. Mire Chatman (Dynamo Moscow): 18.7
6. David Hawkins (Virtus Lottomatica Roma): 18.5
7. Julius Jenkins (Euphony Bree): 17.8
8. Corey Brewer (Aris Thessaloniki): 17.5
9. Mario Austin (Hapoel Jerusalem): 17.37
10. Mike Penberthy (Alba Berlin): 17.3
11. Milan Gurović (Crvena Zvezda Belgrade): 16.6
12. Ruben Douglas (Dynamo Moscow): 16.2

Assists per game:

1. Lamont Jones (Lukoil Academic Sofia): 6.3
2. Todor Stoykov (Lukoil Academic Sofia): 4.6
3. Meir Tapiro (Hapoel Jerusalem): 4.3
4. Terrell McIntyre (Landi Renzo Reggio Emilia): 4.2
5. Travis Conlan (Euphony Bree): 4.0
6. Goran Jeretin (Crvena Zvezda Belgrade): 4
7. Jermaine Guice (Le Mans Sarthe Basket): 3.8
8. Gerrod Henderson (Crvena Zvezda Belgrade): 3.71
9. Sergio Rodríguez (Adecco Estudiantes Madrid): 3.7
10. Roel Moors (Spirou Charleroi): 3.58
11. Yohann Sangare (Adecco ASVEL Villeurbanne): 3.57

Rebounds per game:

1. Mario Austin (Hapoel Jerusalem): 9.4
2. Charles Gaines (Adecco ASVEL Villeurbanne): 8.14
3. Michael Wright (Besiktas ColaTurka Istanbul): 8.1
4. Malick Badiane (Deutsche Bank Frankfurt Skyliners): 8
5. David Simon (Lukoil Academic Sofia): 7.7
6. Roger Huggins (Euphony Bree): 7.33
7. Dennis Latimore (Demon Astronauts Amsterdam): 7.3
8. Hüseyin Beşok (Le Mans Sarthe Basket): 7.2
9. Andre Riddick (Spirou Charleroi): 7.0
10. Brian Lynch (Euphony Bree): 7.0
11. Lazaros Papadopoulos (Dynamo Moscow): 6.9
12. Antonis Fotsis (Dynamo Moscow): 6.9

Steals per game:

1. David Hawkins (Virtus Lottomatica Roma): 3
2. Andre Riddick (Spirou Charleroi): 2.9
3. Mire Chatman (Dynamo Moscow): 2.6
4. Terrell McIntyre (Landi Renzo Reggio Emilia): 2.4
5. Travis Conlan (Euphony Bree): 2.25
6. Marko Marinović (FMP Zeleznik Belgrade): 2.25

Blocks per game:

1. Mile Ilić (FMP Zeleznik Belgrade): 1.5
2. David Simon (Lukoil Academic Sofia): 1.5
3. Malick Badiane (Deutsche Bank Frankfurt Skyliners): 1.4
4. Alain Koffi (Le Mans Sarthe Basket): 1.4
5. Leroy Watkins (Queluz Sintra PM): 1.4
6. Andre Riddick (Spirou Charleroi): 1.2

Average index rating:

1. Mario Austin (Hapoel Jerusalem): 22.6
2. Lamont Jones (Lukoil Academic Sofia): 22.2
3. Mire Chatman (Dynamo Moscow): 21.6
4. Michael Wright (Besiktas ColaTurka Istanbul): 21.4
5. Horace Jenkins (Hapoel Jerusalem): 20.6
6. David Hawkins (Virtus Lottomatica Roma): 19.57
7. Lazaros Papadopoulos (Dynamo Moscow): 19.56
8. Todor Stoykov (Lukoil Academic Sofia): 19.1
9. Milan Gurović (Crvena Zvezda Belgrade): 18.5
10. Roger Huggins (Euphony Bree): 18.1
11. Corey Brewer (Aris Thessaloniki): 18.0
12. Terrell McIntyre (Landi Renzo Reggio Emilia): 17.9

== 2006–07 ==
Points per game:

1. Milan Gurović (Crvena Zvezda Belgrade): 25.8
2. Leon Rodgers (EiffelTowers Den Bosch): 22.6
3. Mario Austin (Hapoel Jerusalem): 19.2
4. Kevin Houston (Dexia Mons-Hainaut): 18.1
5. Aubrey Reese (Besiktas ColaTurka Istanbul): 18
6. Rashad Wright (Telindus Oostende): 17.4
7. Tariq Kirksay (SLUC Nancy): 16.6
8. Andrzej Pluta (Anwil Wloclawek): 16.55
9. Chuck Eidson (SIG Basket Strasbourg): 16.53
10. George Evans (Dexia Mons-Hainaut): 16.4
11. Darjuš Lavrinovič (UNICS Kazan): 15.2

Assists per game:

1. Mark Dickel (Anwil Wloclawek): 5.6
2. Kristaps Valters (Amatori Snaidero Udine): 5
3. Eddie Shannon (BK Ventspils): 5
4. Melvin Booker (Khimki Moscow): 4.7
5. Sam Jones (EiffelTowers Den Bosch): 4.4
6. DeJuan Collins (Brose Baskets Bamberg): 4.33
7. Lamont Jones (Lukoil Academic Sofia): 4.3
8. Aubrey Reese (Besiktas ColaTurka Istanbul): 4.2
9. Antonio Burks (Crvena Zvezda Belgrade): 4.16
10. Meir Tapiro (Hapoel Jerusalem): 4.14
11. Aleksandar Rašić (FMP Zeleznik Belgrade): 3.8

Rebounds per game:

1. Tariq Kirksay (SLUC Nancy): 9.5
2. Elvir Ovčina (Telindus Oostende): 8.7
3. Mario Austin (Hapoel Jerusalem): 8.14
4. Felipe Reyes (Real Madrid): 7.5
5. Cyril Julian (SLUC Nancy): 7.4
6. Eric Hicks (Telindus Oostende): 7.3
7. Dušan Jelić (BK Ventspils): 7.1
8. Jackson Vroman (Gran Canaria Grupo Dunas): 7
9. Aerick Sanders (SIG Basket Strasbourg): 7
10. Jacob Jaacks (Amatori Snaidero Udine): 7
11. Kšyštof Lavrinovič (UNICS Kazan): 7

Steals per game:

1. Tariq Kirksay (SLUC Nancy): 2.6
2. George Evans (Dexia Mons-Hainaut): 2.3
3. Damon Williams (Amatori Snaidero Udine): 2.2
4. Milenko Topić (KK Hemofarm Vršac): 2.1
5. Rimas Kaukėnas (Montepaschi Siena): 2
6. Lamont Jones (Lukoil Academic Sofia): 2

Blocks per game:

1. Sharrod Ford (Alba Berlin): 2.5
2. Kšyštof Lavrinovič (UNICS Kazan): 1.8
3. Darjuš Lavrinovič (UNICS Kazan): 1.7
4. Benjamin Eze (Montepaschi Siena): 1.5
5. Wiktor Grudziński (Anwil Wloclawek): 1.44
6. Yemi Nicholson (Dexia Mons-Hainaut): 1.4
7. Eric Hicks (Telindus Oostende): 1.4

Average index rating:

1. Milan Gurović (Crvena Zvezda Belgrade): 25.5
2. Leon Rodgers (EiffelTowers Den Bosch): 23.7
3. Mario Austin (Hapoel Jerusalem): 22.57
4. Kevin Houston (Dexia Mons-Hainaut): 22.5
5. Tariq Kirksay (SLUC Nancy): 22.4
6. Chuck Eidson (SIG Basket Strasbourg): 21.1
7. George Evans (Dexia Mons-Hainaut): 19.9
8. Darjuš Lavrinovič (UNICS Kazan): 18.9
9. Cyril Julian (SLUC Nancy): 18.45
10. Kšyštof Lavrinovič (UNICS Kazan): 18.4
11. Romain Sato (Montepaschi Siena): 17.6
12. DeJuan Collins (Brose Baskets Bamberg): 17.4

== 2007–08 ==
Points per game:

1. De'Teri Mayes (Allianz Swans Gmunden): 21.1
2. Henry Domercant (Dynamo Moscow): 20.6
3. Derrick Allen (Deutsche Bank Frankfurt Skyliners): 19.9
4. Khalid El-Amin (Turk Telekom Ankara): 19.6
5. Travis Reed (BC Kalev/Cramo Tallinn): 19.5
6. Lance Williams (KK Bosna Sarajevo): 19.4
7. Radoslav Rančík (CEZ Nymburk): 19.3
8. Jimmy Baxter (BK Ventspils): 19.16
9. David Logan (PGE Turow Zgorzelec): 18.6
10. Willie Deane (Lukoil Academic Sofia): 18.5
11. Tadija Dragićević (Crvena Zvezda Belgrade): 18.4

Assists per game:

1. Omar Cook (Crvena Zvezda Belgrade): 6.1
2. Willie Deane (Lukoil Academic Sofia): 5.8
3. Pascal Perrier-David (Benetton Fribourg Olympic): 5.3
4. Shammond Williams (Pamesa Valencia): 5.2
5. Maximiliano Stanic (EB Pau Orthez): 5.1
6. Ian Boylan (Allianz Swans Gmunden): 4.81
7. Victor Sada (Akasvayu Girona): 4.76
8. Andres Rodriguez (PGE Turow Zgorzelec): 4.73
9. Justin Hamilton (Spirou Charleroi): 4.6
10. Ricky Rubio (DKV Joventut Badalona): 4.5
11. Dean Oliver (EiffelTowers Den Bosch): 4.5
12. Bryan Bailey (KK Bosna Sarajevo): 4.5

Rebounds per game:

1. Virgil Carutasu (CSU Asesoft Ploiesti): 10
2. Pero Antić (Lukoil Academic Sofia): 9.1
3. Tariq Kirksay (UNICS Kazan): 9
4. Kevin Johnson (Allianz Swans Gmunden): 9
5. Pops Mensah-Bonsu (Benetton Tamoil Treviso): 8.3
6. Derrick Allen (Deutsche Bank Frankfurt Skyliners): 7.9
7. A. J. Bramlett (ASK Riga): 7.5
8. Graham Brown (Ovarense Aerosoles Ovar): 7.4
9. Uchenna Nsomwu (ASVEL Villeurbanne): 7.33
10. James Thomas (Fortitudo Beghelli Bologna): 7.3

Steals per game:

1. Chris Williams (Turk Telekom Ankara): 2.66
2. Brandon Gay (Antwerp Diamond Giants): 2.6
3. Ryan Sears (Antwerp Diamond Giants): 2.5
4. Omar Cook (Crvena Zvezda Belgrade): 2.42
5. Vladimir Dašić (Buducnost Podgorica): 2.4
6. Willie Deane (Lukoil Academic Sofia): 2.3

Blocks per game:

1. Akin Akingbala (BK Ventspils): 2.7
2. Andre Riddick (Spirou Charleroi): 2
3. Rashard Griffith (CSU Asesoft Ploiesti): 1.6
4. Michael Bauer (SLUC Nancy): 1.5
5. Aerick Sanders (ASK Riga): 1.5

Average index rating:

1. Willie Deane (Lukoil Academic Sofia): 20.9
2. Henry Domercant (Dynamo Moscow): 20.8
3. Travis Reed (BC Kalev/Cramo Tallinn): 20.7
4. Tariq Kirksay (UNICS Kazan): 20.5
5. Lance Williams (KK Bosna Sarajevo): 20.33
6. Derrick Allen (Deutsche Bank Frankfurt Skyliners): 20.3
7. Jackson Vroman (Akasvayu Girona): 20
8. Marc Gasol (Akasvayu Girona): 19.94
9. Chris Williams (Turk Telekom Ankara): 19.91
10. Radoslav Rančík (CEZ Nymburk): 19.7
11. Rudy Fernández (DKV Joventut Badalona): 19.4
