= EuroCup Basketball MVP of the Round =

The EuroCup Basketball MVP of the Round is the player of the week award for each round of the secondary level European-wide professional club basketball league in Europe, EuroCup Basketball. The EuroCup Basketball League is the European-wide professional basketball league that is one tier level below the top-tier EuroLeague. The award began with the 2002–03 season.

== 2002–03 ==
Regular Season

- Week 1: Jamie Arnold (Krka) 40
- Week 2: Nikolai Khryapa (Ural Great) 38
- Week 3: Miroslav Radosevic (Roseto) 38
- Week 4: Acie Earl (Darussafaka) 32
- Week 5: Acie Earl (Darussafaka) 45
- Week 6: Alberto Angulo (Lleida) 39
- Week 7: Vincent Jones (Darussafaka) 35
- Week 8: Maceo Baston (Joventut) 39
- Week 9: Juan Espil (Joventut) 34
- Week 10: Joe Spinks (Ricoh) 32

Playoff

- Eighthfinals Game 1: Ognjen Aškrabić (FMP Zeleznik) 38
- Eighthfinals Game 2: Michael Ruffin (Lleida) 30
- Quarterfinals Game 1: Juan Espil (Joventut) 36
- Quarterfinals Game 2: Ognjen Aškrabić (FMP Zeleznik) 32
- Semifinals Game 1: Dejan Tomašević (Pamesa) 27
- Semifinals Game 2: Nikola Radulović (Joventut) 22

== 2003–04 ==
Regular Season

- Week 1: Priest Lauderdale (Lukoil) 55
- Week 2: Rasheed Brokenborough (Superfund) 48
- Week 3: Tunji Awajobi (Hapoel) 35
- Week 4: Jerry McCullough (Varese) 41
- Week 5: Jamie Arnold (Joventut) 35
- Week 6: Chris Mims (EiffelTowers) 41
- Week 7: Rasheed Brokenborough (Superfund) 37
- Week 8: Tunji Awajobi (Hapoel) 40
- Week 9: Erik Nelson (EiffelTowers) 34
- Week 10: Randy Duck (Brighton) 45

Playoff

- Eighthfinals Game 1: Kimani Ffriend (Reflex) 35
- Eighthfinals Game 2: Jaume Comas (Lleida) 32
- Quarterfinals Game 1: Robertas Javtokas (Rytas) & Doron Sheffer (Hapoel) 24
- Quarterfinals Game 2: Robertas Javtokas (Rytas) 35
- Semifinals Game 1: Antonio Bueno (Real Madrid) 33
- Semifinals Game 2: Willie Solomon (Hapoel) 45

== 2004–05 ==
Regular Season

- Week 1: Marko Marinović (Reflex) 43
- Week 2: John Whorton (Darussafaka) 41
- Week 3: Michael Watson (Slask) 41
- Week 4: Kimani Ffriend (Hapoel) 43
- Week 5: Ivan Koljević (Buducnost) 46
- Week 6: Fred House (Rytas) 50
- Week 7: Bill Edwards (RheinEnergie) 39
- Week 8: Trojs Ostlers (Liege) 45
- Week 9: Matt Nielsen (PAOK) 37
- Week 10: Marcus Faison (Charleroi) & Brindley Wright (Ventspils) 39

Playoff

- Eighthfinals Game 1: Pete Mickeal (Makedonikos) 36
- Eighthfinals Game 2: Nebojša Bogavac (Hemofarm) 40
- Quarterfinals Game 1: Pete Mickeal (Makedonikos) 33
- Quarterfinals Game 2: Milenko Topić (Hemofarm) 32
- Semifinals Game 1: Nebojša Bogavac (Hemofarm) & Igor Rakočević (Pamesa) 36
- Semifinals Game 2: Pete Mickeal (Makedonikos) 40

== 2005–06 ==
Regular Season

- Week 1: Kšyštof Lavrinovič (UNICS) 36
- Week 2: Vladan Vukosavljević (Hemofarm) 35
- Week 3: Julius Jenkins (Euphony) 36
- Week 4: Hüseyin Beşok (Le Mans) 38
- Week 5: Corey Brewer (Aris) 43
- Week 6: Ryan Stack (Aris) 46
- Week 7: Mario Austin (Hapoel) 41
- Week 8: Leroy Watkins (Queluz) 36
- Week 9: Mire Chatman (Dynamo) 33
- Week 10: Larry Lewis (Alicante) 36

Playoff

- Eighthfinals Game 1: Brian Lynch (Euphony) 33
- Eighthfinals Game 2: Savas Iliadis (Panionios) 43
- Quarterfinals Game 1: David Hawkins (Roma) 32
- Quarterfinals Game 2: Lazaros Papadopoulos (Dynamo) 34
- Semifinals Game 1: Lazaros Papadopoulos (Dynamo) 34
- Semifinals Game 2: Mire Chatman (Dynamo) 29

== 2006–07 ==
Regular Season

- Week 1: Chuck Eidson (Strasbourg) 37
- Week 2: Kevin Houston (Dexia Mons-Hainaut) 39
- Week 3: Milan Gurović (Crvena Zvezda) 42
- Week 4: Saulius Štombergas (UNICS) 38
- Week 5: Milan Gurović (Crvena Zvezda) 36
- Week 6: Milan Gurović (Crvena Zvezda) 30
- Week 7: Leon Rodgers (Eiffel Towers) 36
- Week 8: Kristaps Valters (Snaidero Udine) 41
- Week 9: Yemi Nicholson (Dexia Mons-Hainaut) 36
- Week 10: Leon Rodgers (Eiffel Towers) 43

Playoff

- Eightfinals Game 1: Chuck Eidson (Strasbourg) 31
- Eightfinals Game 2: Chuck Eidson (Strasbourg) 32
- Quarterfinals Game 1: Mario Austin (Hapoel) 29
- Quarterfinals Game 2: Louis Bullock (Real Madrid) 26
- Semifinals Game 1: Charles Smith (Real Madrid) 34
- Semifinals Game 2: Felipe Reyes (Real Madrid) 35

== 2007–08 ==
Regular Season

- Week 1: Michael Wright (Turk Telekom) 49
- Week 2: Mamadou N'Diaye (Panellinios) 41
- Week 3: Jamie Arnold (Hapoel) 38
- Week 4: Jamie Arnold (Hapoel) 42
- Week 5: Goran Nikolić (Alba Berlin) 45
- Week 6: Pero Antić (Lukoil Academic) 39
- Week 7: Robert Hite (Galatasaray) & Ian Boylan (Swans Gmunden) 35
- Week 8: Jackson Vroman (Akasvayu) 47
- Week 9: Kaya Peker (Besiktas) 38
- Week 10: Cordell Henry (Ovarense) 46

Playoff

- Last 32 Game 1: Tariq Kirksay (UNICS) 41
- Last 32 Game 2: Rashid Atkins (ASCO Slask) 38
- Last 16 Game 1: Preston Shumpert (Besiktas) 35
- Last 16 Game 2: Darjuš Lavrinovič (UNICS) 38
- Quarterfinals: Shammond Williams (Pamesa) 28
- Semifinals: Rudy Fernández (DKV Joventut) 25

== 2008–09 ==
Regular Season

- Week 1: Sandro Nicević (Benetton) 35
- Week 2: Travis Hansen (Dynamo) 30
- Week 3: Ivan Radenović (Panellinios) 39
- Week 4: Stefan Marković (Hemofarm) 43
- Week 5: Mire Chatman (Besiktas) 41
- Week 6: Loukas Mavrokefalidis (Maroussi) 34

Top 16

- Week 1: Andreas Glyniadakis (Maroussi) 29
- Week 2: Len Matela (Spirou) 34
- Week 3: Chuck Eidson (Rytas) 37
- Week 4: Timofey Mozgov (Khimki) & Kelly McCarty (Khimki) 28
- Week 5: Kelly McCarty (Khimki) & Khalid El-Amin (Azovmash) 35
- Week 6: Marko Banić (Bilbao) 35

== 2009–10 ==
=== Regular season ===
Week	Player	Team	PIR
1.	(Slovakia) Radoslav Rančík	(Turkey) Galatasaray Café Crown	41
2.	(United States) Mire Chatman	(Turkey) Beşiktaş Cola Turka	42
3.	(Lithuania) Mindaugas Kuzminskas	(Lithuania) Šiauliai	34
4.	(North Macedonia) Darius Washington	(Turkey) Galatasaray Café Crown	45
5.	(United States) Brandon Hunter	(Israel) Hapoel Jerusalem	33
6.	(United States) Mike Taylor	(Serbia) Crvena zvezda	35

=== Top 16 ===
Week	Player	Team	PIR
1.	(Croatia) Marko Popović (United States) Julius Jenkins	(Russia) UNICS Kazan (Germany) Alba Berlin	26
2.	(United States) Philip Ricci	(Czech Republic) ČEZ Nymburk	34
3.	(Australia) Matt Nielsen	(Spain) Valencia	29
4.	(Spain) Víctor Claver (United States) Devin Smith	(Spain) Valencia (Greece) Panellinios	26
5.	(United States) Casey Jacobsen	(Germany) Brose Baskets	31
6.	(United States) Marc Salyers	(France) Le Mans	33

=== Quarterfinals ===
Game	Player	Team	PIR
1.	(United States) Brandon Hunter	(Israel) Hapoel Jerusalem	32
2.	(Australia) Matt Nielsen	(Spain) Valencia	25

== 2010–11 ==
=== Regular season ===
Week	Player	Team	PIR
1.	(United States) P. J. Tucker	(Greece) Aris	35
2.	(Greece) Christos Tapoutos	(Greece) Aris	32
3.	(United States) Demetrius Alexander	(Ukraine) Azovmash	36
4.	(Slovenia) Primož Brezec	(Russia) Krasnye Krylia	40
5.	(Nigeria) Ebi Ere	(Italy) Pepsi Caserta	35
6.	(Croatia) Dontaye Draper	(Croatia) Cedevita	36

=== Top 16 ===
Week	Player	Team	PIR
1.	(United States) Mike Scott	(Germany) Göttingen	36
2.	(United States) Paul Davis	(Spain) Cajasol	31
3.	(Croatia) Damjan Rudež	(Croatia) Cedevita	35
4.	(Croatia) Damjan Rudež (2) (United States) Bracey Wright	(Croatia) Cedevita (Croatia) Cedevita	28
5.	(United States) Devin Smith	(Italy) Benetton Bwin Treviso	47
6.	(United States) Benjamin Dewar	(France) Le Mans	29

=== Quarterfinals ===
Game	Player	Team	PIR
1.	(Belarus) Vladimir Veremeenko	(Russia) UNICS	40
2.	(United States) Bracey Wright (2)	(Croatia) Cedevita	37

== 2011–12 ==
=== Regular season ===
Week	Player	Team	PIR
1	(France) Tony Parker	(France) ASVEL Basket	40
2	(United States) J. R. Giddens	(Greece) P.A.O.K.	32
3	(Azerbaijan) Nik Caner-Medley	(Spain) Valencia Basket	29
4	(Montenegro) Nikola Vučević	(Montenegro) Budućnost	36
5	(North Macedonia) Jeremiah Massey	(Russia) PBC Lokomotiv-Kuban	28
6	(France) Fabien Causeur	(France) Cholet Basket	33

=== Top 16 ===
Week	Player	Team	PIR
1	(United States) Patrick Beverley	(Russia) Spartak Saint Petersburg	27
2	(Greece) Loukas Mavrokefalidis	(Russia) Spartak Saint Petersburg	29
3	(France) Nando de Colo	(Spain) Valencia Basket	40
4	(United States) Hilton Armstrong	(France) ASVEL Basket	26
5	(United States) DaShaun Wood	(Germany) Alba Berlin	37
6	(North Macedonia) Jeremiah Massey	(Russia) PBC Lokomotiv-Kuban	37

=== Quarterfinals ===
Game	Player	Team	PIR
1	(Montenegro) Bojan Dubljević	(Montenegro) Budućnost	25
2	(Israel) Yotam Halperin	(Russia) Spartak St. Petersburg	31

== 2012–13 ==
=== Regular season ===
Week	Player	Team	PIR
1	(Belgium) Matt Lojeski	(Belgium) BC Telenet Oostende	34
2	(Dominican Republic) Sammy Mejia	(Turkey) Banvit B.K.	35
2	(United States) Tywain McKee	(Russia) BC Triumph Lyubertsy	35
3	(United States) Tywain McKee (2)	(Russia) BC Triumph Lyubertsy	42
4	(Azerbaijan) Charles Davis	(Turkey) Banvit B.K.	36
5	(United States) Courtney Fells	(Israel) Hapoel Jerusalem	41
6	(United States) Derrick Brown	(Russia) Lokomotiv-Kuban	39

=== Top 16 ===
Week	Player	Team	PIR
1	(Serbia) Čedomir Vitkovac	(Montenegro) Budućnost VOLI	40
2	(Bulgaria) E. J. Rowland	(Latvia) VEF Rīga	36
3	(Serbia) Čedomir Vitkovac (2)	(Montenegro) Budućnost VOLI	30
4	(United States) John Bryant	(Germany) Ratiopharm Ulm	36
5	(United States Virgin Islands) Walter Hodge	(Poland) Stelmet Zielona Góra	42
6	(United States Virgin Islands) Walter Hodge (2)	(Poland) Stelmet Zielona Góra	39

=== Quarterfinals ===
Game	Player	Team	PIR
1	(United States) John Bryant (2)	(Germany) Ratiopharm Ulm	30
2	(Lithuania) Simas Jasaitis	(Russia) Lokomotiv-Kuban	28

=== Semifinals ===
Game	Player	Team	PIR
1	(Lithuania) Simas Jasaitis (2)	(Russia) Lokomotiv-Kuban	33
2	(Serbia) Stefan Marković	(Spain) Valencia BC	22

== 2013–14 ==
=== Regular season ===
Week	Player	Team	PIR
1	(Italy) Pietro Aradori	(Italy) FoxTown Cantu	36
2	(Benin) Mouphtaou Yarou	(Serbia) Radnički Kragujevac	41
3	(Venezuela) Donta Smith	(Israel) Maccabi Haifa	41
4	(Liberia) Joe Ragland	(Italy) FoxTown Cantu	36
5	(United States) Mike Green	(Russia) Khimki Moscow	34
6	(Montenegro) Vladimir Golubović	(Turkey) Aykon TED Ankara	36
7	(Finland) Sasu Salin	(Slovenia) Union Olimpija	32
8	(United States) T. J. Carter	(Greece) Panionios	34
9	(United States) Jason Love	(Belgium) Belfius Mons-Hainaut	34
10	(United States) Alando Tucker	(Bulgaria) Lukoil Academic	43

=== Last 32 ===
Week	Player	Team	PIR
1	(United States) Omar Thomas	(Italy) Dinamo Basket Sassari	30
2	(United States) Trenton Meacham	(France) JSF Nanterre	33
3	(Venezuela) Donta Smith (2)	(Israel) Maccabi Haifa	40
4	(Uruguay) Esteban Batista	(Turkey) Pınar Karşıyaka	46
5	(Montenegro) Vladimir Golubović (2)	(Turkey) Aykon TED Ankara	51
6	(United States) Caleb Green	(Italy) Dinamo Basket Sassari	34

=== Eighthfinals ===
Week	Player	Team	PIR
1	(Lithuania) Darjuš Lavrinovič	(Ukraine) Budivelnyk Kyiv	38
2	(Montenegro) Vladimir Golubović (3)	(Turkey) Aykon TED Ankara	38

=== Quarterfinals ===
Game	Player	Team	PIR
1	(Kosovo) Justin Doellman	(Spain) Valencia BC	34
2	(United States) Reggie Redding	(Germany) Alba Berlin	40

=== Semifinals ===
Game	Player	Team	PIR
1	(Montenegro) Bojan Dubljević	(Spain) Valencia BC	31
2	(Greece) Nikos Zisis	(Russia) UNICS	31

=== Finals ===
Game	Player	Team	PIR
1	(Kosovo) Justin Doellman (2)	(Spain) Valencia BC	35
2	(Kosovo) Justin Doellman (3)	(Spain) Valencia BC	34

== 2014–15 ==
=== Regular season ===
Week	Player	Team	PIR
1	(United States) Brandon Triche	(Italy) Acea Roma	37
2	(United States) Dee Brown	(Romania) Asesoft Ploiești	33
3	(United States) Brandon Triche (2)	(Italy) Acea Roma	27
4	(Bulgaria) Darius Adams	(France) Nancy	36
5	(United States Virgin Islands) Walter Hodge	(Russia) Zenit	34
6	(North Macedonia) Romeo Travis	(Russia) Krasny Oktyabr	34
7	(Italy) Achille Polonara	(Italy) Grissin Bon Reggio Emilia	34
7	(North Macedonia) Romeo Travis (2)	(Russia) Krasny Oktyabr	34
8	(Spain) Willy Hernangómez	(Spain) Sevilla	31
9	(United States) Darius Johnson-Odom	(Italy) FoxTown Cantù	40
10	(Serbia) Milan Mačvan	(Serbia) Partizan NIS	34

=== Last 32 ===
Week	Player	Team	PIR
1	(Cape Verde) Walter Tavares	(Spain) Herbalife Gran Canaria	40
2	(United States) Anthony Randolph	(Russia) Lokomotiv Kuban	36
2	(Montenegro) Halil Kanacević	(Slovenia) Union Olimpija	36
3	(Lithuania) Martynas Gecevičius	(Lithuania) Lietuvos Rytas	38
4	(United States) Mardy Collins	(Poland) PGE Turów	40
5	(Poland) Damian Kulig	(Poland) PGE Turów	38
6	(United States) Sharrod Ford	(France) Paris-Levallois	37

=== Eighthfinals ===
Week	Player	Team	PIR
1	(Dominican Republic) Sammy Mejia	(Turkey) Banvit	33
2	(United States) Jon Diebler	(Turkey) Pınar Karşıyaka	31

=== Quarterfinals ===
Week	Player	Team	PIR
1	(Montenegro) Tyrese Rice	(Russia) Khimki	27
1	(Croatia) Krunoslav Simon	(Russia) Lokomotiv Kuban	27
2	(United States) James White	(Russia) UNICS	38

=== Semifinals ===
Week	Player	Team	PIR
1	(Cape Verde) Walter Tavares (2)	(Spain) Herbalife Gran Canaria	30
2	(Montenegro) Tyrese Rice (2)	(Russia) Khimki	22
2	(United States) James Augustine	(Russia) Khimki	22

=== Finals ===
Week	Player	Team	PIR
1	(United States) Paul Davis	(Russia) Khimki	22
2	(United States) James Augustine (2)	(Russia) Khimki	22

== 2015–16 ==
=== Regular season ===
Round	Player	Team	PIR	Ref.
1	(United States) Raymar Morgan	(Germany) ratiopharm Ulm	41	
2	(Serbia) Dragan Milosavljević	(Germany) Alba Berlin	29	
3	(United States) Zabian Dowdell	(Russia) Zenit Saint Petersburg	51	
4	(Bosnia and Herzegovina) Zack Wright	(Slovenia) Union Olimpija	36	
4	(United States) Errick McCollum	(Turkey) Galatasaray Odeabank	36	
5	(Bulgaria) E. J. Rowland	(Israel) Hapoel Jerusalem	38	
5	(Greece) Loukas Mavrokefalidis	(Greece) AEK	38	
6	(Greece) Loukas Mavrokefalidis (2)	(Greece) AEK	36	
6	(Lithuania) Kšyštof Lavrinovič	(Lithuania) Lietuvos rytas	36	
7	(United States) Billy Baron	(Belgium) Proximus Spirou	36	
7	(Mexico) Paul Stoll	(Russia) Avtodor Saratov	36	
8	(United States) Tywain McKee	(France) Le Mans Sarthe	36	
9	(Spain) Quino Colom	(Russia) UNICS	38	
10	(United States) Keith Langford	(Russia) UNICS	31	

=== Last 32 ===
Round	Player	Team	PIR	Ref.
1	(Spain) Quino Colom (2)	(Russia) UNICS	41	
2	(Spain) Quino Colom (3)	(Russia) UNICS	47	
3	(Gabon) Stéphane Lasme	(Turkey) Galatasaray Odeabank	35	
4	(France) Adrien Moerman	(Turkey) Banvit	38	
5	(United States) Travis Peterson	(Russia) Avtodor Saratov	33	
6	(Slovenia) Alen Omić	(Spain) Herbalife Gran Canaria	37	

=== Eighthfinals ===
Game	Player	Team	PIR	Ref.
1	(United States) Victor Rudd	(Russia) Nizhny Novgorod	32	
2	(United States) Errick McCollum (2)	(Turkey) Galatasaray Odeabank	29	

=== Quarterfinals ===
Game	Player	Team	PIR	Ref.
1	(Slovenia) Alen Omić (2)	(Spain) Herbalife Gran Canaria	27	
1	(United States) Mardy Collins	(France) SIG Strasbourg	27	
1	(United States) Deon Thompson	(Germany) Bayern Munich	27	
2	(United States) Dominique Sutton	(Italy) Dolomiti Energia Trento	34	

=== Semifinals ===
Game	Player	Team	PIR	Ref.
1	(Azerbaijan) Chuck Davis	(Turkey) Galatasaray Odeabank	29	
2	(United States) D. J. Seeley	(Spain) Herbalife Gran Canaria	28	

== 2016–17 ==
=== Regular season ===
Round	Player	Team	PIR	Ref.
1	(United States) Kyle Kuric	(Spain) Herbalife Gran Canaria	25	
2	(United States) Kyle Kuric (2)	(Spain) Herbalife Gran Canaria	25	
2	(Lithuania) Žygimantas Skučas	(Lithuania) Lietkabelis	25	
2	(Lithuania) Kšyštof Lavrinovič	(Lithuania) Lietkabelis	25	
3	(Georgia (country)) Jacob Pullen	(Russia) Khimki	32	
4	(Bosnia and Herzegovina) Elmedin Kikanović	(Germany) Alba Berlin	35	
5	(United States) Pierre Jackson	(Croatia) Cedevita	37	
6	(Lithuania) Gintaras Leonavičius	(Lithuania) Lietkabelis	31	
7	(United States) Kyle Fogg	(Spain) Unicaja	33	
8	(Russia) Ivan Strebkov	(Russia) Nizhny Novgorod	36	
9	(Bosnia and Herzegovina) Elmedin Kikanović (2)	(Germany) Alba Berlin	33	
10	(Latvia) Jānis Timma	(Russia) Zenit Saint Petersburg	36	

=== Top 16 ===
Round	Player	Team	PIR	Ref.
1	(United States) DeAndre Kane	(Russia) Nizhny Novgorod	39	
2	(Latvia) Jānis Timma (2)	(Russia) Zenit Saint Petersburg	31	
3	(Poland) David Logan	(Lithuania) Lietuvos rytas	38	
4	(Russia) Alexey Shved	(Russia) Khimki	37	
5	(United States) Tarence Kinsey	(Israel) Hapoel Jerusalem	33	
6	(United States) Royce O'Neale	(Spain) Herbalife Gran Canaria	34	

=== Quarterfinals ===
Game	Player	Team	PIR	Ref.
1	(Spain) Fernando San Emeterio	(Spain) Valencia Basket	29	
2	(Russia) Alexey Shved (2)	(Russia) Khimki	22	
3	(Montenegro) Bojan Dubljević	(Spain) Valencia Basket	26	

=== Semifinals ===
Game	Player	Team	PIR	Ref.
1	(Spain) Fernando San Emeterio (2)	(Spain) Valencia Basket	31	
2	(Serbia) Nemanja Nedović	(Spain) Unicaja	23	
3	(Spain) Fernando San Emeterio (3)	(Spain) Valencia Basket	21	

== 2017–18 ==
=== Regular season ===
Round	Player	Team	PIR	Ref.
1	(United States) Luke Sikma	(Germany) Alba Berlin	31	
2	(Lithuania) Rokas Giedraitis	(Lithuania) Lietuvos rytas	31	
2	(United States) Jalen Reynolds	(Italy) Grissin Bon Reggio Emilia	31	
3	(United States) Nigel Williams-Goss	(Serbia) Partizan NIS	34	
4	(United States) Peyton Siva	(Germany) Alba Berlin	31	
4	(United States) Trevor Lacey	(Russia) Lokomotiv Kuban	31	
5	(Lithuania) Adas Juškevičius	(Lithuania) Lietkabelis	38	
6	(United States) Chris Kramer	(Lithuania) Lietuvos rytas	38	
7	(United States) John Roberson	(France) ASVEL	30	
8	(Germany) Danilo Barthel	(Germany) Bayern Munich	33	
9	(France) Boris Diaw	(France) Levallois Metropolitans	29	
10	(United States) John Roberson (2)	(France) ASVEL	44	

=== Top 16 ===
Round	Player	Team	PIR	Ref.
1	(United States) Dustin Hogue	(Italy) Dolomiti Energia Trento	40	
2	(Slovakia) Kyle Kuric	(Russia) Zenit Saint Petersburg	40	
3	(United States) Devin Booker	(Germany) Bayern Munich	38	
4	(Lithuania) Martynas Echodas	(Lithuania) Lietuvos rytas	29	
5	(Germany) Danilo Barthel (2)	(Germany) Bayern Munich	42	
6	(United States) Peyton Siva (2)	(Germany) Alba Berlin	26	

=== Quarterfinals ===
Game	Player	Team	PIR	Ref.
1	(United States) Jalen Reynolds (2)	(Italy) Grissin Bon Reggio Emilia	29	
2	(Russia) Dmitry Kulagin	(Russia) Lokomotiv Kuban	34	
3	(United States) Chris Wright	(Italy) Grissin Bon Reggio Emilia	34	

=== Semifinals ===
Game	Player	Team	PIR	Ref.
1	(Nigeria) Michael Eric	(Turkey) Darüşşafaka	30	
2	(Bosnia and Herzegovina) Scottie Wilbekin	(Turkey) Darüşşafaka	44	

=== Finals ===
Game	Player	Team	PIR	Ref.
1	(United States) Will Cummings	(Turkey) Darüşşafaka	25	

== 2018–19 ==
=== Regular season ===
Round	Player	Team	PIR	Ref.
1	(Senegal) Maurice Ndour	(Russia) UNICS	41	
2	(Cameroon) Kenny Kadji	(Turkey) Tofaş	34	
3	(Georgia (country)) Giorgi Shermadini	(Spain) Unicaja	34	
3	(United States) Raymar Morgan	(Russia) UNICS	34	
4	(United States) Isaiah Miles	(France) Limoges CSP	31	
5	(United States) Luke Sikma	(Germany) Alba Berlin	31	
6	(Finland) Erik Murphy	(Germany) Fraport Skyliners	35	
7	(Dominican Republic) Sammy Mejía	(Turkey) Tofaş	30	
7	(France) Landing Sané	(Montenegro) Mornar Bar	30	
8	(United States) Justin Cobbs	(Croatia) Cedevita	36	
9	(Croatia) Rok Stipčević	(Lithuania) Rytas	41	
10	(United States) Patrick Miller	(Germany) ratiopharm Ulm	33	

=== Top 16 ===
Round	Player	Team	PIR	Ref.
1	(France) Andrew Albicy	(Spain) MoraBanc Andorra	37	
2	(United States) Jamel McLean	(Russia) Lokomotiv Kuban	31	
3	(United States) Luke Sikma (2)	(Germany) Alba Berlin	33	
4	(Montenegro) Bojan Dubljević	(Spain) Valencia Basket	29	
5	(Belarus) Artsiom Parakhouski	(Lithuania) Rytas	30	
6	(Serbia) Dragan Apić	(Russia) Lokomotiv Kuban	30	

=== Quarterfinals ===
Game	Player	Team	PIR	Ref.
1	(United States) Errick McCollum	(Russia) UNICS	37	
2	(Jamaica) Dylan Ennis	(Spain) MoraBanc Andorra	23	
2	(Lithuania) Rokas Giedraitis	(Germany) Alba Berlin	23	
2	(Russia) Dmitry Kulagin	(Russia) Lokomotiv Kuban	23	
3	(United States) Peyton Siva	(Germany) Alba Berlin	16	

=== Semifinals ===
Game	Player	Team	PIR	Ref.
1	(United States) Peyton Siva (2)	(Germany) Alba Berlin	32	
2	(Belgium) Sam Van Rossom	(Spain) Valencia Basket	19	

=== Finals ===
Game	Player	Team	PIR	Ref.
1	(Georgia (country)) Will Thomas	(Spain) Valencia Basket	25	
2	(United States) Luke Sikma (3)	(Germany) Alba Berlin	20	
3	(Montenegro) Bojan Dubljević (2)	(Spain) Valencia Basket	27	

== 2019–20 ==
=== Regular season ===
Round	Player	Team	PIR	Ref.
1	(United States) Chris Babb	(Greece) Promitheas	29	
1	(Canada) Kenny Chery	(France) Nanterre 92	29	
1	(United States) Greg Whittington	(Turkey) Galatasaray Doğa Sigorta	29	
2	(Serbia) Rade Zagorac	(Serbia) Partizan NIS	35	
3	(United States) Alex Hamilton	(Israel) Maccabi Rishon LeZion	38	
4	(United States) Errick McCollum	(Russia) UNICS	41	
5	(Slovenia) Zoran Dragić	(Germany) ratiopharm Ulm	30	
5	(United States) Derek Willis	(Germany) ratiopharm Ulm	30	
6	(United States) Mitchell Watt	(Italy) Umana Reyer Venezia	37	
7	(United States) Hassan Martin	(Montenegro) Budućnost VOLI	29	
7	(Dominican Republic) Sammy Mejía	(Turkey) Tofaş	29	
8	(Greece) Michael Bramos	(Italy) Umana Reyer Venezia	28	
8	(United States) Tyler Larson	(Germany) EWE Baskets Oldenburg	28	
9	(Italy) Alessandro Gentile	(Italy) Dolomiti Energia Trento	39	
10	(United States) James Kelly	(Israel) Maccabi Rishon LeZion	40	

=== Top 16 ===
Round	Player	Team	PIR	Ref.
1	(Austria) Rašid Mahalbašić	(Germany) EWE Baskets Oldenburg	38	
2	(Ivory Coast) Deon Thompson	(Spain) Unicaja	27	
3	(Slovenia) Klemen Prepelič	(Spain) Joventut	45	
4	(Greece) Loukas Mavrokefalidis	(Greece) Promitheas	37	
5	(United States) Corey Walden	(Serbia) Partizan NIS	33	
6	(United States) Devin Williams	(Turkey) Tofaş	32	

== 2020–21 ==
=== Regular season ===
Week	Player	Team	PIR	Ref.
1	(United States) Troy Caupain	(Germany) ratiopharm Ulm	34	
2	(United States) Willie Reed	(Montenegro) Budućnost VOLI	30	
3	(United States) Alan Williams	(Russia) Lokomotiv Kuban	33	
4	(Lithuania) Gytis Masiulis	(Lithuania) Lietkabelis	38	
5	(France) Pierre Pelos	(France) JL Bourg	33	
6	(United States) Alan Williams (2)	(Russia) Lokomotiv Kuban	36	
7	(Germany) Dylan Osetkowski	(Germany) ratiopharm Ulm	41	
8	(United States) Jamal Jones	(Turkey) Bahçeşehir Koleji	38	
9	(United States) Isaiah Canaan	(Russia) UNICS Kazan	39	
10	(Egypt) Assem Marei	(France) Metropolitans 92	37	

=== Top 16 ===
Week	Player	Team	PIR	Ref.
1	(United States) Isaiah Whitehead	(Montenegro) Mornar	30	
2	(United States) Luke Maye	(Italy) Dolomiti Energia Trento	34	
3	(Slovenia) Jaka Blažič	(Slovenia) Cedevita Olimpija	41	
4	(France) Alpha Kaba	(France) Nanterre 92	33	
5	(Spain) Jaime Fernández	(Spain) Unicaja	33	
6	(Lithuania) Mindaugas Kuzminskas	(Russia) Lokomotiv Kuban	33	

=== Quarterfinals ===
Game	Player	Team	PIR	Ref.
1–2	(United States) Willie Reed (2)	(Montenegro) Budućnost VOLI	35	
3	(France) Mathias Lessort	(France) AS Monaco	29	

=== Semifinals ===
Game	Player	Team	PIR	Ref.
1–2	(Serbia) Miloš Teodosić	(Italy) Virtus Segafredo Bologna	34	
3	(United States) John Brown	(Russia) UNICS Kazan	31	

== 2021–22 ==
=== Regular season ===
Week	Player	Team	PIR	Ref.
1	(United States) Johnathan Motley	(Russia) Lokomotiv Kuban	39	
2	(United States) John Shurna	(Spain) Gran Canaria	26	
3	(United States) Johnathan Motley (2)	(Russia) Lokomotiv Kuban	38	
4	(United States) Jaron Blossomgame	(Germany) ratiopharm Ulm	35	
5	(Montenegro) Justin Cobbs	(Montenegro) Budućnost VOLI	44	
6	(United States) Errick McCollum	(Russia) Lokomotiv Kuban	39	
7	(Brazil) Cristiano Felício	(Germany) ratiopharm Ulm	26	
7	(United States) Sindarius Thornwell	(Germany) ratiopharm Ulm	26	
8	(United States) Errick McCollum (2)	(Russia) Lokomotiv Kuban	37	
9	(United States) Caleb Homesley	(Germany) Hamburg Towers	45	
10	(United States) Errick McCollum (3)	(Russia) Lokomotiv Kuban	33	
11	(United States) Anthony Clemmons	(Turkey) Türk Telekom	32	
12	(United States) Jaylon Brown	(Germany) Hamburg Towers	34	
13	(France) Mathias Lessort	(Serbia) Partizan NIS Belgrade	32	
14	(France) Mouhammadou Jaiteh	(Italy) Virtus Segafredo Bologna	41	
15	(Germany) Lukas Meisner	(Germany) Hamburg Towers	29	
16	(United States) Semaj Christon	(Germany) ratiopharm Ulm	31	
17	(Central African Republic) Kevarrius Hayes	(Turkey) Frutti Extra Bursaspor	37	
18	(United States) Zach LeDay	(Serbia) Partizan NIS Belgrade	30	

=== MVP of the playoff rounds ===
Category	Player	Team	Ref.
Eightfinals MVP	(United States) Andrew Andrews	(Turkey) Frutti Extra Bursaspor	
Quarterfinals MVP	(France) Mouhammadou Jaiteh	(Italy) Virtus Segafredo Bologna	
Semifinals MVP	(Central African Republic) Kevarrius Hayes	(Turkey) Frutti Extra Bursaspor	

== 2022–23 ==
=== Regular season ===
Round	Player	Team	PIR	Ref.
1	(Lithuania) Arnoldas Kulboka	(Hellenic Basketball Federation) Promitheas Patras	31	
2	(United States) J'Covan Brown	(Israel) Hapoel Tel Aviv	39	
2	(United Kingdom) Ovie Soko	(United Kingdom) London Lions	39	
2	(United States) Joe Young	(Greece) Promitheas Patras	39	
3	(United States) Jordan Floyd	(French Federation of Basketball) Mincidelice JL Bourg en Bresse	31	
4	(United States) (France) Jaylen Hoard	(Israeli Basketball Association) Hapoel Tel Aviv	33	
5	(United States) Dave Dudzinski	(Turkish Basketball Federation) Frutti Extra Bursaspor	28	
6	(France) Ismaël Kamagate	(French Federation of Basketball) Paris Basketball	41	
7	(United States) Derek Willis	(Italian Basketball Federation) Umana Reyer Venezia	31	
8	(Czech Republic) Ondřej Balvín	(Basketball Federation of Ukraine) Prometey	34	
9	(United States) Jordan McRae	(Israeli Basketball Association) Hapoel Tel Aviv	32	
10	(United States) Jordan McRae (2)	(Israeli Basketball Association) Hapoel Tel Aviv	40	
11	(United States) J'Covan Brown (2)	(Israel) Hapoel Tel Aviv	33	
12	(Lithuania) Arnoldas Kulboka (2)	(Greece) Promitheas Patras	36	
13	(United States) Chinanu Onuaku	(Israel) Hapoel Tel Aviv	35	
14	(United States) Jordan McRae (3)	(Israeli Basketball Association) Hapoel Tel Aviv	31	
15	(United States) Mitchell Watt	(Italian Basketball Federation) Umana Reyer Venezia	34	
16	(United States) Anthony Cowan	(Hellenic Basketball Federation) Promitheas Patras	34	
17	(United States) Anthony Cowan (2)	(Hellenic Basketball Federation) Promitheas Patras	38	
18	(United States) (France) Jaylen Hoard (2)	(Israeli Basketball Association) Hapoel Tel Aviv	34	

=== MVP of the playoff rounds ===
Round	Player	Team	PIR	Ref.
Eighthfinals	(United States) Anthony Cowan	(Hellenic Basketball Federation) Promitheas Patras	32	
Quarterfinals	(United States) Jerian Grant	(Turkish Basketball Federation) Türk Telekom	31	
Semifinals	(France) Axel Bouteille	(Turkish Basketball Federation) Türk Telekom	22	

== 2023–24 ==
=== Regular season ===
Round	Player	Team	PIR	Ref.
1	(North Macedonia) T. J. Shorts	(French Federation of Basketball) Paris Basketball	30	
2	(United States) Matt Morgan	(British Basketball) London Lions	30	
3	(Slovakia) Vladimír Brodziansky	(Spanish Basketball Federation) Joventut Badalona	31	
3	(United States) Trevion Williams	(Germany) ratiopharm Ulm	31	
4	(United States) Tre'Shawn Thurman	(Lithuanian Basketball Federation) Wolves	37	
5	(United States) Andrew Andrews	(Spanish Basketball Federation) Joventut Badalona	42	
6	(Nigeria) Rasheed Sulaimon	(Lithuanian Basketball Federation) Wolves	36	
7	(Cuba) Karel Guzmán	(Romanian Basketball Federation) U-BT Cluj-Napoca	34	
8	(United States) Xavier Munford	(Israeli Basketball Association) Hapoel Tel Aviv	35	
9	(Canada) Conor Morgan	(British Basketball) London Lions	36	
10	(United States) Matt Morgan (x2)	(British Basketball) London Lions	32	
10	(North Macedonia) T. J. Shorts (x2)	(France) Paris Basketball	32	
11	(Czech Republic) Ondřej Balvín	(Basketball Federation of Ukraine) Prometey Slobozhanske	28	
12	(North Macedonia) T. J. Shorts (x3)	(French Federation of Basketball) Paris Basketball	37	
13	(United States) Tyrone Wallace	(Turkish Basketball Federation) Türk Telekom	39	
14	(Canada) Kyle Wiltjer	(Italian Basketball Federation) Umana Reyer Venezia	39	
15	(Dominican Republic) Ángel Delgado	(Turkish Basketball Federation) Beşiktaş Emlakjet	36	
16	(United States) Tyrone Wallace (x2)	(Turkish Basketball Federation) Türk Telekom	39	
17	(Romania) Emanuel Cățe	(Romanian Basketball Federation) U-BT Cluj-Napoca	38	
18	(Italy) Marco Spissu	(Italian Basketball Federation) Umana Reyer Venezia	29	

=== Playoffs ===
Round	Player	Team	PIR	Ref.
Eighthfinals	(Dominican Republic) Andrés Feliz	(Spanish Basketball Federation) Joventut Badalona	36	
Quarterfinals	(North Macedonia) T. J. Shorts (x4)	(French Federation of Basketball) Paris Basketball	28	
Semifinals	(North Macedonia) T. J. Shorts (x5)	(French Federation of Basketball) Paris Basketball	28.5	

== 2024–25 ==
=== Regular season ===
Round	Player	Team	PIR	Ref.
1	(Croatia) Ante Tomić	(Spanish Basketball Federation) Joventut Badalona	32	
2	(United States) Jared Harper	(Israeli Basketball Association) Hapoel Jerusalem	27	
3	(United States) Johnathan Motley	(Israeli Basketball Association) Hapoel Tel Aviv	34	
4	(United States) Anthony Cowan Jr.	(Lithuanian Basketball Federation) Wolves Twinsbet	33	
5	(France) Axel Bouteille	(Turkish Basketball Federation) Bahçeşehir Koleji	34	
5	(Serbia) Marko Pecarski	(Lithuania) 7bet-Lietkabelis Panevėžys	34	
6	(United States) Jared Harper (x2)	(Israeli Basketball Association) Hapoel Jerusalem	43	
7	(United States) Anthony Brown	(Turkish Basketball Federation) Türk Telekom	45	
8	(United States) Zavier Simpson	(Romanian Basketball Federation) U-BT Cluj-Napoca	34	
9	(United States) Jared Harper (x3)	(Israeli Basketball Association) Hapoel Jerusalem	38	
10	(Colombia) Braian Angola	(Turkish Basketball Federation) Türk Telekom	34	
11	(United States) Anthony Cowan Jr. (x2)	(Lithuanian Basketball Federation) Wolves Twinsbet	33	
12	(Bosnia and Herzegovina) Kenan Kamenjaš	(Basketball Federation of Montenegro) Budućnost VOLI	34	
13	(United States) Jared Harper (x4)	(Israeli Basketball Association) Hapoel Jerusalem	38	
14	(United States) Jaleen Smith	(Turkish Basketball Federation) Bahçeşehir Koleji	32	
15	(United States) Jaleen Smith (2)	(Turkish Basketball Federation) Bahçeşehir Koleji	39	
16	(United States) D. J. Seeley	(Romanian Basketball Federation) U-BT Cluj-Napoca	33	
17	(United States) Jared Harper (x5)	(Israeli Basketball Association) Hapoel Jerusalem	36	
18	(Canada) Tyler Ennis	(Italian Basketball Federation) Umana Reyer Venezia	33	

=== Playoffs ===
Round	Player	Team	PIR	Ref.
Eighthfinals	(United States) Devin Robinson	(Basketball Federation of Slovenia) Cedevita Olimpija	30	
Quarterfinals	(Montenegro) Marko Simonović	(Turkish Basketball Federation) Bahçeşehir Koleji	27	
Semifinals	(Israel) Yam Madar	(Israeli Basketball Association) Hapoel Tel Aviv	20.7	

== 2025–26 ==
=== Regular season ===
Round	Player	Team	PIR	Ref.
1	(United States) Bryce Jones	(Hellenic Basketball Federation) Aris Thessaloniki	33	
1	(Greece) Michalis Lountzis	(Greece) Panionios	33	
2	(United States) D.J. Stewart	(Basketball Federation of Slovenia) Cedevita Olimpija	41	
3	(United States) Chris Ledlum	(German Basketball Federation) Ratiopharm Ulm	29	
4	(Serbia) Dušan Miletić	(Romanian Basketball Federation) U-BT Cluj-Napoca	31	
5	(United States) Jared Harper	Hapoel Bank Yahav Jerusalem	36	
6	(United States) Jared Harper (x2)	(Israeli Basketball Association) Hapoel Bank Yahav Jerusalem	37	
6	(United States) Bryce Jones (x2)	(Hellenic Basketball Federation) Aris Thessaloniki	37	
6	(Canada) (Czech Republic) James Karnik	(Lithuania) Neptūnas Klaipėda	37	
7	(United States) Cassius Winston	(Israeli Basketball Association) Hapoel Bank Yahav Jerusalem	37	
8	(Germany) Kevin Yebo	(German Basketball Federation) Niners Chemnitz	38	
9	(Croatia) Ante Žižić	(Turkish Basketball Federation) Beşiktaş Gain	36	
10	(North Macedonia) Andrej Jakimovski	(Italian Basketball Federation) Dolomiti Energia Trento	43	
11	(Australia) Mitch Creek	(Romanian Basketball Federation) U-BT Cluj-Napoca	43	
12	(United States) DeVante' Jones	(Italian Basketball Federation) Dolomiti Energia Trento	37	
12	(United States) Fatts Russell	(Romanian Basketball Federation) U-BT Cluj-Napoca	37	
13	(Latvia) Rihards Lomažs	(Lithuania) Neptūnas Klaipėda	36	
14	(Croatia) Ante Žižić (x2)	(Turkish Basketball Federation) Beşiktaş Gain	34	
15	(United States) DeVante' Jones (x2)	(Italian Basketball Federation) Dolomiti Energia Trento	43	
16	(United States) Malachi Flynn	(Turkish Basketball Federation) Bahçeşehir Koleji	35	
17	(United States) Jared Harper (x3)	(Israeli Basketball Association) Hapoel Bank Yahav Jerusalem	33	
18	(United States) Tyler Cavanaugh	(Turkish Basketball Federation) Bahçeşehir Koleji	32	

=== Playoffs ===
Round	Player	Team	PIR	Ref.
Eighthfinals	(Panama) Iverson Molinar	(Romanian Basketball Federation) U-BT Cluj-Napoca	39	
Quarterfinals	(United States) Kyle Allman	(Turkish Basketball Federation) Türk Telekom	31	
Semifinals	(United States) Devon Dotson	(Turkish Basketball Federation) Beşiktaş Gain	21.0	

== 2026–27 ==
=== Regular season ===
Round	Player	Team	PIR	Ref.
1	(United States) Darius Brown	(Italian Basketball Federation) Dolomiti Energia Trento	29	
2	(Canada) Thomas Kennedy	(British Basketball) London Lions	34	
3	(United States) Kenneth Lofton Jr.	(Israeli Basketball Association) Hapoel Midtown Jerusalem	33	
4	(United States) Kyle Guy	(Spanish Basketball Federation) La Laguna Tenerife	30	
4	(Canada) Nick Ongenda	(Spain) Kids&Us Manresa	30	
5	(United States) Joel Scott	(British Basketball) London Lions	31	
5	(United States) Darius Brown (x2)	(Italy) Dolomiti Energia Trento	31	
6	(Turkey) Doğuş Özdemiroğlu	(Turkish Basketball Federation) Türk Telekom	28	
7	(Croatia) Miro Bilan	(Italian Basketball Federation) Maxima Roma	34	
8	(United States) Javante McCoy	(Bulgarian Basketball Federation) Balkan Botevgrad	40	

== See also ==
- EuroLeague MVP of the Round
