= Tariq Kirksay =

French American basketball player

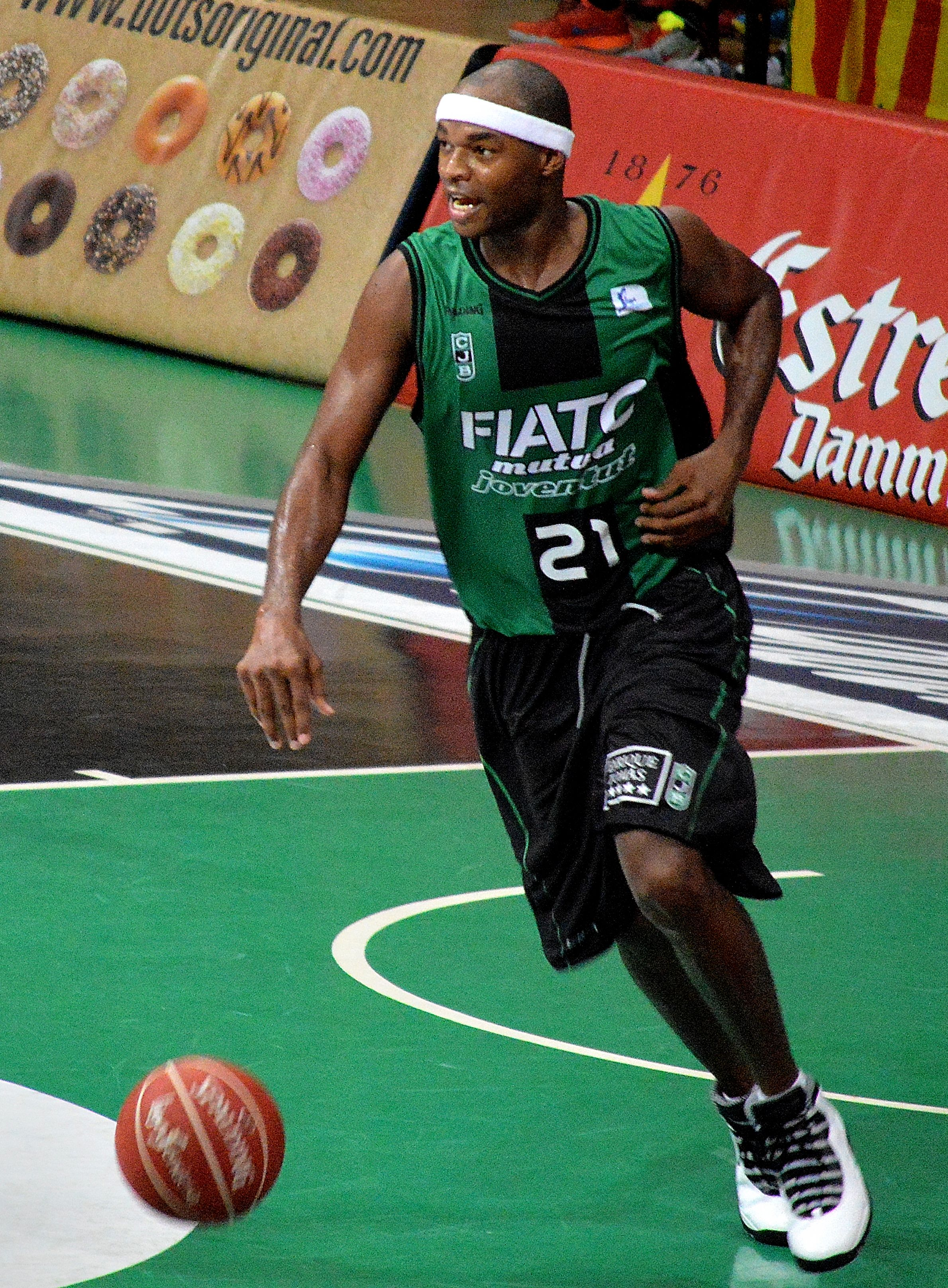
- Kirksay playing for FIATC Joventut in 2014

Personal information
- Born: September 7, 1979 (age 47) Bronx, New York, U.S.
- Listed height: 6 ft 6 1/4 in (1.99 m)
- Listed weight: 210 lb (95 kg)

Career information
- High school: Rice (New York City, New York)
- College: Iona (1996–2000)
- NBA draft: 2000: undrafted
- Playing career: 2000–2019
- Position: Shooting guard / small forward

Career history
- 2000–2001: Andino La Rioja
- 2001: Long Island Surf
- 2001: Bravos de Portuguesa
- 2001: Bucaneros de Campeche
- 2001–2002: BC Besançon
- 2002–2003: Rueil
- 2003–2004: JL Bourg-en-Bresse
- 2004–2007: SLUC Nancy
- 2007–2009: UNICS Kazan
- 2009–2011: Cajasol Sevilla
- 2011–2012: Fabi Shoes Montegranaro
- 2012–2013: Estudiantes
- 2013: Bucaneros de La Guaira
- 2013–2015: Joventut
- 2016: Primeiro de Agosto
- 2017: Canarias
- 2018–2019: Fos Provence Basket

Career highlights
- Champions League champion (2017); All-EuroCup First Team (2011); Russian Cup winner (2009); French League All-Star (2005); Venezuelan League All-Star (2001); MAAC Player of the Year (2000); 2× First-team All-MAAC (1999, 2000)

Tariq Kinte Kirksay (born September 7, 1979) is a French American former professional basketball player. He was born in the Bronx, New York, where he grew up.

== High school ==
Kirksay played basketball at Rice High School, in New York City, New York.

== College ==
Kirksay played college basketball at Iona College, with the Iona Gaels, from 1996 to 2000. He was a two-time All-Metro Atlantic Athletic Conference (MAAC) First Team selection, in the years 1999 and 2000.

== Professional career ==
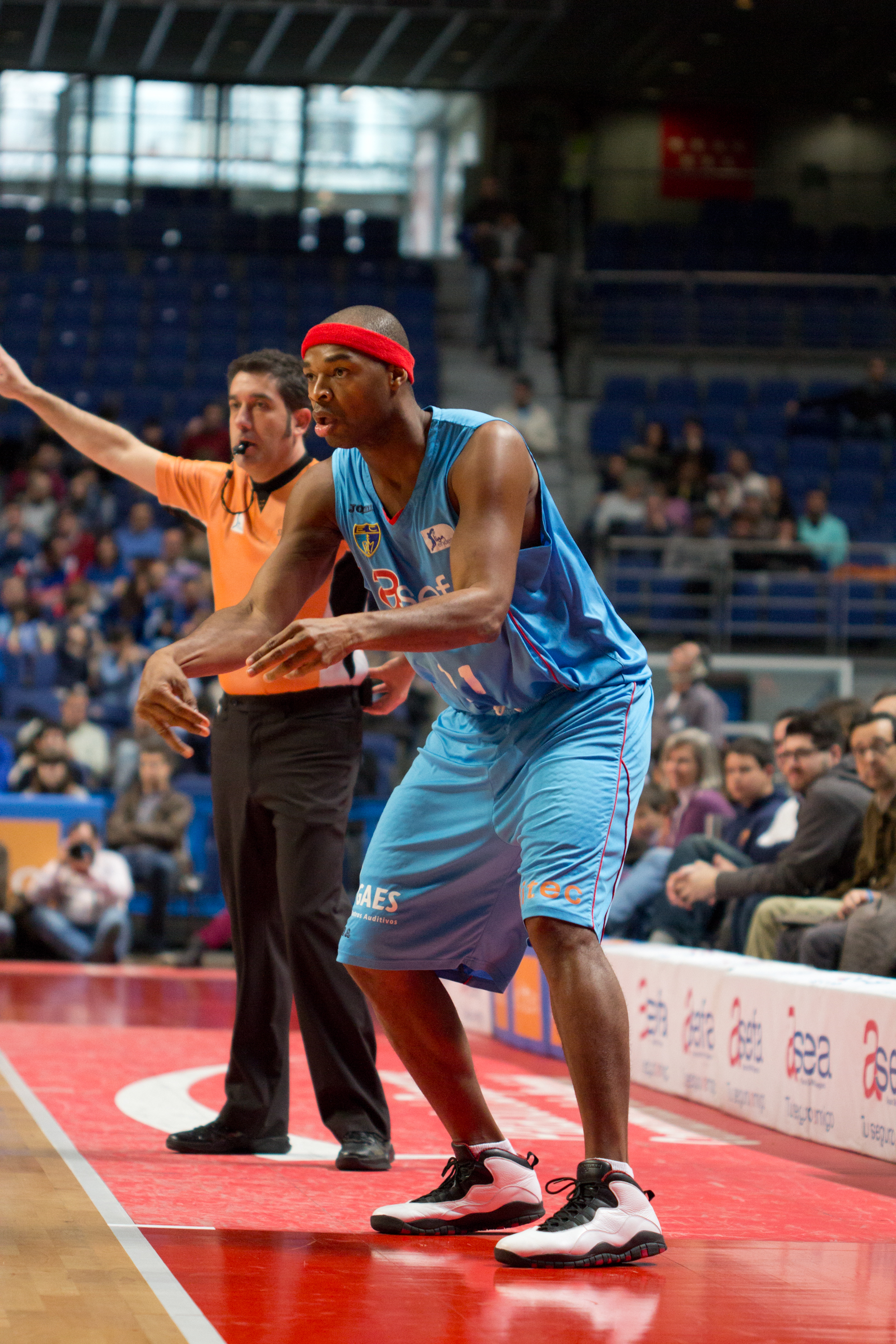
Kirksay playing with Estudiantes, in 2013.

Kirksay won the Russian Cup with UNICS Kazan in 2009. He was named to the European-wide 2nd-tier level EuroCup's All-EuroCup First Team of the 2010–11 season. In 2017 he signs for the Spanish team Iberostar Tenerife, winning the Basketball Champions League Final Four.

== French national team ==
Kirksay was a member of the senior men's French national basketball team. With France's senior team, he played at the EuroBasket 2007.
