= Andre Riddick =

American Basketball Player

Personal information
- Born: February 1, 1973 (age 53) Brooklyn, New York, U.S.
- Listed height: 6 ft 10 in (2.08 m)

Career information
- High school: Bishop Loughlin Memorial (Brooklyn, New York)
- College: Kentucky (1991–1995)
- NBA draft: 1995: undrafted
- Playing career: 1995–2013
- Position: Center

Career history
- 1995–1996: Blue Winds
- 1996–1999: Tera Mars / Mars
- 1999: Trotamundos de Carabobo
- 1999: Metropolitanos de Mauricio Baez
- 1999–2000: JDA Dijon Basket
- 2000: Trotamundos de Carabobo
- 2000–2001: JDA Dijon Basket
- 2001: Trotamundos de Carabobo
- 2001–2002: Paris Basket Racing
- 2002–2013: Spirou Charleroi

Career highlights
- Fourth-team Parade All-American (1991); Belgian champion 2003, 2004, 2008, 2009, 2010, 2011; Belgian Cup champion 2003, 2009; Belgian League MVP 2004

Andre Riddick (born February 1, 1973) is a retired American professional basketball player. He is the ULEB Cup's All-Time Leader for rebounds (383), steals (116) and blocks (122) and also has the highest ULEB Cup percentage of blocks (2 blocks per game). He played for the University of Kentucky from 1991 to 1995.

== Tenure at Kentucky ==
Nicknamed "The Rejector", Andre Riddick held the single season block record at 83 for Kentucky together with Melvin Turpin until it was broken by Anthony Davis in 2012, and he held the Kentucky single game block record of 9 together with Sam Bowie until it was broken by Nerlens Noel in 2013. A notoriously bad free throw shooter, the standard Riddick set has been invoked more than once when a Kentucky player had a bad night at the line. Riddick often performed a shuffle after he dunked the basketball.

Riddick and his Kentucky teammates made the NCAA Final Four in 1993. During Kentucky's 1995 NCAA tournament Elite Eight game against North Carolina, Riddick angrily confronted Rasheed Wallace after Wallace hit him with his elbow, resulting in a technical foul issued to Walter McCarty, a call hotly disputed by former Kentucky coach Rick Pitino.

== Professional career ==
During his professional career, Riddick spent eleven years at Spirou Charleroi, claiming six Belgian championships (2003, 2004, 2008, 2009, 2010, 2011) and two Belgian cup titles (2003, 2009). In 2003–04, he earned Most Valuable Player distinction in the Belgian league. In the Belgian league as well as in the ULEB Cup, Riddick became the all-time leader in blocked shots.

Riddick also played professionally in Japan, Taiwan, Venezuela and France. In 1999, he won the Venezuelan championship with the Trotamundos de Carabobo.

== Coaching career ==
Riddick continued to coach in the Cincinnati area with the private coaching service CoachUp. In 2015, he was named assistant coach at the University of Cincinnati Clermont.
