= Willie Deane =

American-Bulgarian basketball player

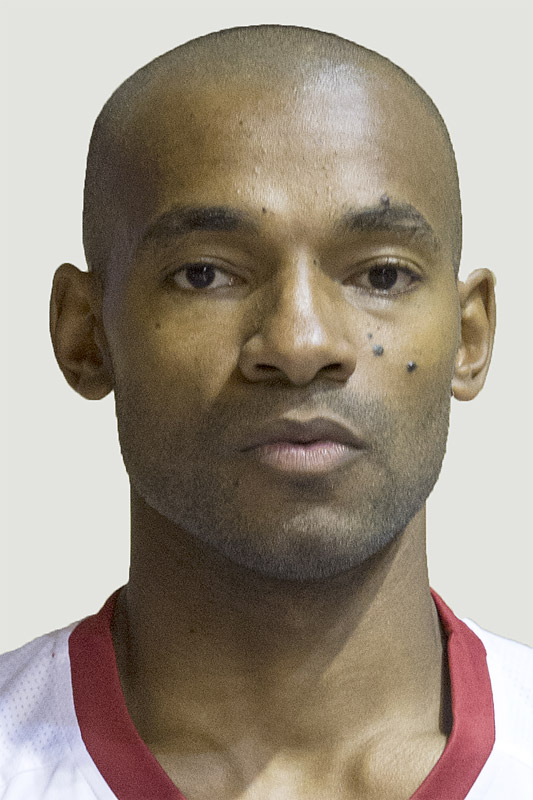

Personal information
- Born: February 23, 1980 (age 46) Schenectady, New York
- Listed height: 6 ft 1 in (1.85 m)
- Listed weight: 195 lb (88 kg)

Career information
- High school: Schenectady (Schenectady, New York)
- College: Boston College (1998–1999); Purdue (2000–2003)
- NBA draft: 2003: undrafted
- Playing career: 2003–2018
- Position: Point guard

Career history
- 2003–2004: Ilysiakos
- 2004–2005: Türk Telekom
- 2005: Virtus Bologna
- 2005–2007: Spartak Primorye
- 2007–2008: Lukoil Academic
- 2008: Žalgiris
- 2009: Lukoil Academic
- 2009: Turów Zgorzelec
- 2010: Lukoil Academic
- 2010–2011: SLUC Nancy
- 2011–2012: BC Odesa
- 2012: Asefa Estudiantes
- 2012–2013: Khimik
- 2013–2014: Krasny Oktyabr
- 2014: Emporio Armani Milano
- 2014–2015: Pallacanestro Varese
- 2015: Krasny Oktyabr
- 2015–2016: STB Le Havre
- 2016–2017: Ventspils
- 2017–2018: Châlons-Reims

Career highlights
- Italian League champion (2014); All-VTB United League First Team (2014); French League champion (2011); French Super Cup winner (2011); 3× Bulgarian League champion (2008–2010); Bulgarian Cup winner (2008)

Willie Deane (born February 23, 1980) is an American-Bulgarian former professional basketball player. Deane has won three Bulgarian championships, one Bulgarian Cup, a French championship, a French Super Cup and an Italian championship.

== College career ==
Dean played high school basketball at Schenectady High School, in Schenectady, New York. He played college basketball at Boston College for one season before transferring to Purdue University to complete his final three years of eligibility.

== Professional career ==
In 2008, Deane became a household name in European Basketball when he signed a contract with Zalgiris rumored to be excess of $600,000.

In June 2012, Deane signed with Ukrainian team BC Khimik.

Deane signed with BC Krasny Oktyabr for the 2013–14 season.

On May 12, 2014, he signed with Emporio Armani Milano of the Italian Lega Basket Serie A for the rest of the 2013–14 season.

On September 19, 2014, Deane signed with Pallacanestro Varese. On February 27, 2015, he left Varese and returned to his former team Krasny Oktyabr for the rest of the season.

On November 5, 2015, Deane signed with STB Le Havre of the French LNB Pro A. In March 2016, he left Le Havre and signed with Latvian club Ventspils for the rest of the season. On July 26, 2016, he re-signed with Ventspils for the 2016–17 season.

On June 16, 2017, Deane signed with French club Châlons-Reims for the 2017–18 season.

== Post-basketball career ==
On February 27, 2024, Deane left being a City Parks Director to start an apprenticeship program. He had been with the department since March 2023.
