= Nate Erdmann =

American basketball player (born 1973)

Personal information
- Born: November 21, 1973 (age 52) Fort Dodge, Iowa, U.S.
- Listed height: 6 ft 5 in (1.96 m)
- Listed weight: 195 lb (88 kg)

Career information
- High school: Portales (Portales, New Mexico)
- College: Washington State (1993–1994); Hutchinson CC (1994–1995); Oklahoma (1995–1997)
- NBA draft: 1997: 2nd round, 56th overall pick
- Drafted by: Utah Jazz
- Playing career: 1997–2007
- Position: Shooting guard
- Number: 10

Career history
- 1997–1998: Idaho Stampede
- 1998–2000: Pallacanestro Biella
- 2000–2001: De Vizia Avellino
- 2001–2003: Pallacanestro Trieste
- 2003–2004: Élan Béarnais Pau-Orthez
- 2004–2005: Alerta Cantabria
- 2005: Anwil Włocławek
- 2005–2006: Alerta Cantabria
- 2006–2007: Stal Ostrów Wielkopolski

Career highlights
- Second-team All-Big 12 (1997)
- Stats at Basketball Reference

Nathan Lewis Erdmann (born November 21, 1973) is an American former professional basketball player.

After graduating from Portales High School at Portales, New Mexico in 1993, Erdmann played college basketball at Washington State University, Hutchinson Community College, and the University of Oklahoma. He was selected by the Utah Jazz with the 56th pick in the 1997 NBA draft as a shooting guard. Erdmann was cut by the Jazz in the Summer League, having not played in a single regular-season game.

== Professional career ==
Erdmann signed with the Idaho Stampede of the Continental Basketball Association in 1997.

He played with the Alerta Cantabria of the Spanish Liga ACB in the 2004–2005 season and for one month in the following season with the Polish team BC Anwil. In December 2005, Erdmann returned to Cantabria. Nate ended up playing in Euro leagues for 8+ years with stops in Italy (1998–2000 Pallacanestro Biella; 2000 – 2001 De Vizia Avellino; 2001–2003 Pallacanestro Trieste), France (2003–2004 Elan Bearmais Pau-Othez), Spain (2004–2006 Alerta Cantabria), and Poland (2006–2007 Stal Ostrow Wielkopolski).
