= K'zell Wesson =

American basketball player (born 1977)

K'Zell Wesson
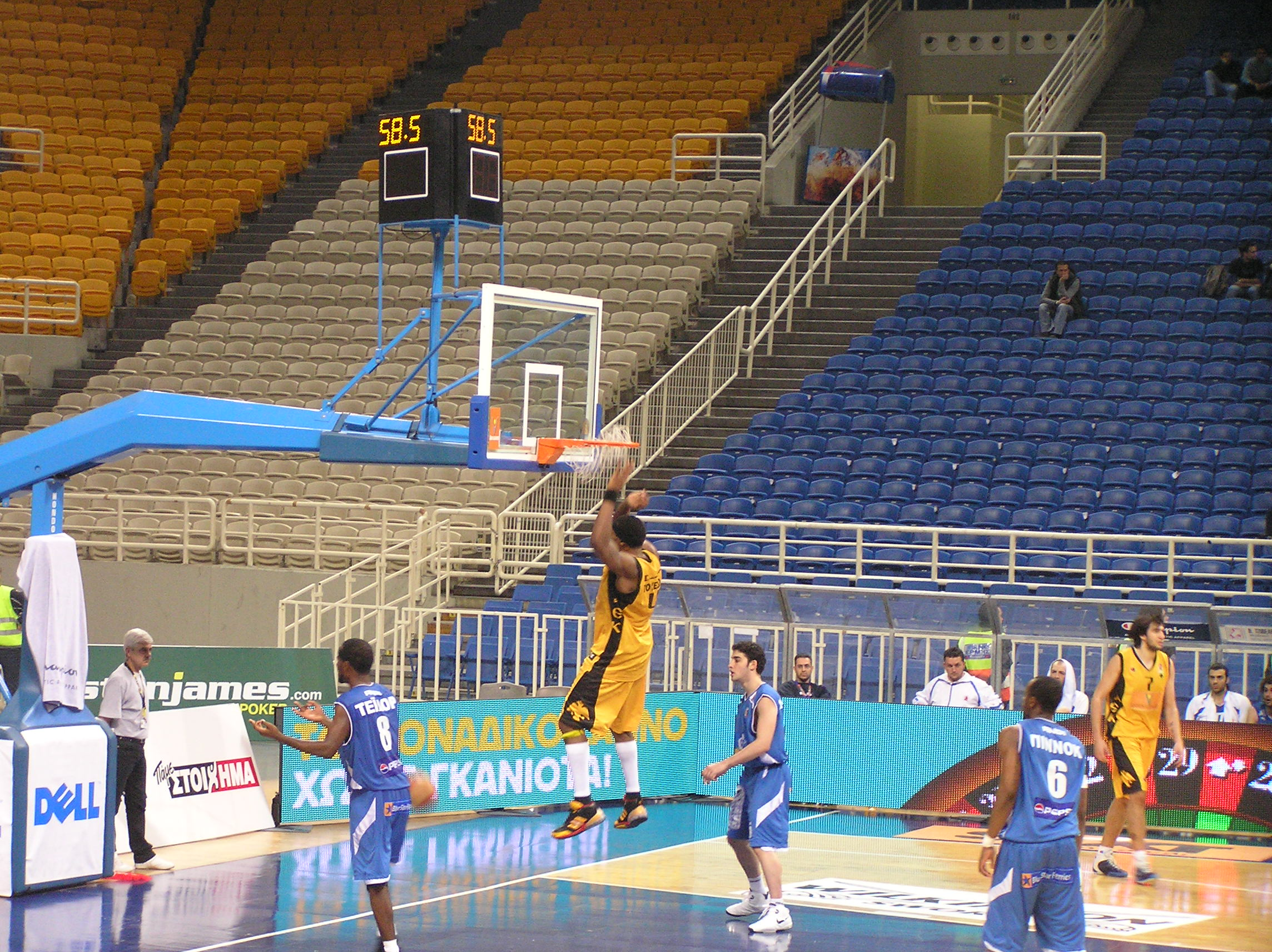
- Wesson dunking the ball while a member of AEK.

Personal information
- Born: June 24, 1977 (age 49) Portland, Oregon
- Listed height: 6 ft 7.5 in (2.02 m)
- Listed weight: 242 lb (110 kg)

Career information
- High school: Jefferson (Portland, Oregon)
- College: South Carolina State (1995–1996); USU Eastern (1996–1997); La Salle (1997–1999)
- NBA draft: 1999: undrafted
- Playing career: 1999–2016
- Position: Power forward / center

Career history
- 1999–2000: Trenton Shooting Stars
- 2000–2001: Büyük Kolej
- 2001: Cocodrilos de Caracas
- 2001–2003: Cholet Basket
- 2003–2004: Roseto Basket Town
- 2004–2005: BCM Gravelines-Dunkerque
- 2005–2006: SIG Strasbourg
- 2006–2007: Brose Baskets
- 2007–2008: AEK Athens
- 2008: PAOK Thessaloniki
- 2009: Besiktas Cola Turka
- 2009–2010: Pınar Karşıyaka
- 2010–2012: Türk Telekom Ankara
- 2011–2012: Erdemir SK
- 2012–2013: Başkent Gençlik
- 2013–2014: Sigal Prishtina
- 2014: Pertevniyal S.K.
- 2014–2015: Gediz Üniversitesi S.K.
- 2016: Afyonkarahisar Belediyespor

Career highlights
- LNB Pro A Top Rebounder (2003); Lega Basket Serie A Rebounding Leader (2004); LNB Pro A Top Rebounder (2006); German Bundesliga champion (2007); All-Star Game MVP (2007); All-Greek League Second Team (2008)

K'Zell Ray Wesson (born June 24, 1977, pronounced Kay-Zell) is an American former professional basketball player. He is 6 ft 7.5 in (2.019 m) in height and he weighs 242 lbs. (110 kg). He plays the position of power forward-center.

== College career ==
Wesson played college basketball at South Carolina State University (1995–96), the College of Eastern Utah (1996–97) and at La Salle University with the La Salle men's basketball team, the La Salle Explorers (1997–1999).
