= Mario Austin =

American basketball player (born 1982)

Personal information
- Born: February 26, 1982 (age 44) Livingston, Alabama, U.S.
- Listed height: 6 ft 9 in (2.06 m)
- Listed weight: 264 lb (120 kg)

Career information
- High school: Sumter County (York, Alabama)
- College: Mississippi State (2000–2003)
- NBA draft: 2003: 2nd round, 36th overall pick
- Drafted by: Chicago Bulls
- Playing career: 2003–2015
- Position: Power forward / center

Career history
- 2003: CSKA Moscow
- 2004: Jackson Rage
- 2004–2005: Lauretana Biella
- 2005–2007: Hapoel Jerusalem
- 2007–2008: Benetton Treviso
- 2008: Beşiktaş Cola Turka
- 2009: Fujian Xunxing
- 2009–2010: Meridiano Alicante
- 2010: Atléticos de San Germán
- 2010–2011: BC Dnipro
- 2011: Titanes del Distrito Nacional
- 2011: Shahrdari Gorgan
- 2011: Kyiv
- 2012–2013: Al Kuwait
- 2013–2014: Kazma
- 2015: KB Peja
- 2015: Deportivo Valdivia

Career highlights
- Israeli Cup winner (2007); 2× Israeli Super League Quintet (2006, 2007); First-team All-SEC (2003); Second-team All-SEC (2002); McDonald's All-American (2000); Second-team Parade All-American (2000)
- Stats at Basketball Reference

Mario Trevon Austin (born February 26, 1982) is an American former professional basketball player.

== College career ==
Austin played 3 seasons at Mississippi State under head coach Rick Stansbury. He is well known for hitting a clutch 3-point shot in the first 3-point attempt of his career at Mississippi State in a 2002 win over Kentucky. Austin was named second team All-SEC that season (2001–02).

Austin returned to the Bulldogs in 2002–03 and was named first team All-SEC. Austin declared for the 2003 NBA draft at the season, choosing not to return to Mississippi State for his senior year.

== Professional career ==
After being drafted 36th overall in the 2003 NBA draft by the Chicago Bulls, Austin left to play overseas, starting his professional career with CSKA Moscow, but was released after an injury before playing an official game. Afterwards he signed with the Jackson Rage of the WBA where he spent the remainder of the season.

In 2004, he signed with Italian team Lauretana Biella and in 2005 he was with Hapoel Jerusalem B.C. who got sponsored by billionaire Arkadi Gaydamak shortly before, he quickly became one of the dominant players in the team and led it to the Uleb Cup semi-finals and to the Israeli League Finals

In the summer of 2007, he joined the Bulls for the 2007 NBA Summer League and later, he signed with Benetton Treviso.

On July 18, 2008, Austin signed with Beşiktaş Cola Turka.

At the start of the 2009–10 season, Austin was signed by Meridiano Alicante, but was released on January 21, 2010. On April 10, 2010, Austin was signed by the Atléticos de San Germán of the Puerto Rican league but was waived the next month.

On August 13, 2010, Austin signed with Ukrainian club BC Dnipro. On April 2, 2011, the Bulls traded his draft rights to the Utah Jazz as part of the Carlos Boozer sign-and-trade.

On October 31, 2011, Austin signed with BC Kyiv.

On November 3, 2012, Austin signed with Al Kuwait. On November 9, 2013, he signed with Kuwaiti club Kazma.

On February 3, 2015, Austin signed with KB Peja of the Siguria Superleague and on October 9, Austin signed with Deportivo Valdivia of the Liga Nacional de Básquetbol de Chile (LNB). On November 14, he was waived by Deportivo Valdivia.

Throughout his 12 years of professional basketball, Austin never played in an NBA game. Making him 1 of 11 players from the 2003 NBA Draft Class to never play in the league.
