= Lamont Jones (basketball, born 1972) =

American former basketball player

Personal information
- Born: July 3, 1972 (age 54) Brooklyn, New York, U.S.
- Listed height: 6 ft 0 in (1.83 m)
- Listed weight: 173 lb (78 kg)

Career information
- High school: Brooklyn Tech (Brooklyn, New York)
- College: Bridgeport (1991–1995)
- NBA draft: 1995: undrafted
- Playing career: 1995–2010
- Position: Guard

Career history
- 1995: Jersey Turnpikes
- 1996: Long Island Surf
- 1996–1997: Connecticut Pride
- 1997: Long Island Surf
- 1997–1998: AB Vacallo
- 1998: Long Island Surf
- 1998–1999: Harrisburg Horizon
- 1999: Connecticut Pride
- 1999: Trotamundos de Carabobo
- 1999: Brooklyn Kings
- 1999–2001: Hapoel Galil Elyon
- 2001–2002: Hapoel Jerusalem
- 2002–2004: Hapoel Galil Elyon
- 2004–2007: Lukoil Academic
- 2007–2008: Hapoel Gilboa/Afula
- 2008–2009: Ironi Ramat Gan
- 2009–2010: BC Rilski Sportist

Career highlights
- Israeli Premier League Assists Leader (2008); First-team Division II All-American – NABC (1995); Second-team Division II All-American – NABC (1993); All Israeli League First Team (2000, 2001, 2003); Israeli League Final Four (2000, 2001, 2002, 2003); Bulgarian League Champion (2005, 2006, 2007); Bulgarian Cup Champion (2006, 2007); Bulgarian League Player of the Year (2006); Bulgarian Import of the Year (2005, 2006, 2007); CBA Champion (1999)

Lamont Jones (born July 3, 1972) is an American former professional basketball player who played the guard position. He played for Hapoel Gilboa/Afula in 2007–08, leading the Israeli Basketball Premier League in assists.

== Personal life ==
Jones is from Brooklyn, New York. He is 6 ft 0 in (183 cm) tall, and weighs 173 pounds (78 kg). His younger brother Charles Jones led the NCAA in scoring in 1996–97 and 1997–98 for Long Island University, and played in the NBA for the Chicago Bulls and the Los Angeles Clippers.

== Basketball career ==
Jones played high school basketball for Brooklyn Technical High School.

He played college basketball for the University of Bridgeport, graduating in 1995. He scored

2,019 Career Points. Averaged 20.8, 19.6, and 21.3 and at least 7 assists is final three years. In 1993–95 Jones averaged 3.05 steals per game, at the time the 7th-highest steal career rate of any NCAA Division II player, and his 708 career assists were the 10th-most of any Division II player. He was a Division II second-team All-American in 1993, and a first-team All-American in 1995. In 2017, he was inducted into the University of Bridgeport Athletics Hall of Fame.

He started his professional career in 1995 with the Jersey Turnpikes of the United States Basketball League (USBL); he had other stints in that league from 1996 to 1998 with the Long Island Surf.

He played in the ABA in 1995 averaging 31 points and 9 assists per game.

He played for the Connecticut Pride of the Continental Basketball Association from 1996 to 1998, averaging 8.2 points, 2.3 rebounds, and 4.0 assists per game in 49 games.

He won the CBA championship in 1999 averaging 19 points in the Playoffs.

Jones played for Hapoel Gilboa/Afula in 2007–08, leading the Israeli Basketball Premier League in assists with an average of 5.7 per game.
