= Priest Lauderdale =

American-Bulgarian basketball player (born 1973)

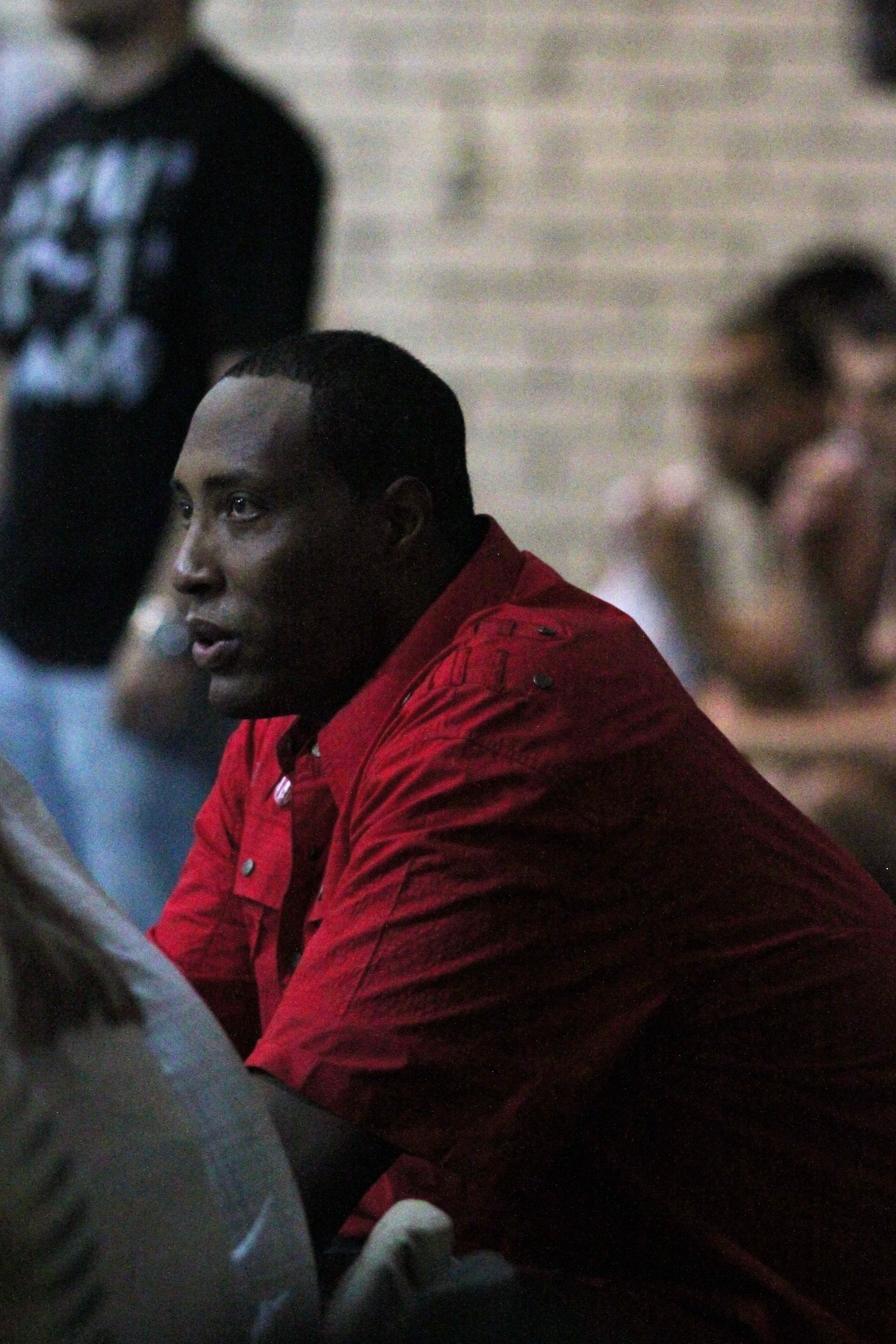
- Lauderdale in Sofia, Bulgaria, 30 May 2011

Personal information
- Born: August 31, 1973 (age 53) Chicago, Illinois, U.S.
- Listed height: 7 ft 4 in (2.24 m)
- Listed weight: 330 lb (150 kg)

Career information
- High school: Carver (Chicago, Illinois)
- College: Central State (1993–1994)
- NBA draft: 1996: 1st round, 28th overall pick
- Drafted by: Atlanta Hawks
- Playing career: 1995–2016
- Position: Center
- Number: 15, 30

Career history
- 1995–1996: Peristeri
- 1996–1997: Atlanta Hawks
- 1997–1998: Denver Nuggets
- 2000: Grand Rapids Hoops
- 2000: Fort Wayne Fury
- 2001: Connecticut Pride
- 2001: Gaiteros del Zulia
- 2002: Apollon Limassol
- 2002–2005: Lukoil Academic
- 2005–2006: Al-Ittihad Jeddah
- 2006: Saba Mehr Kazvin
- 2007: Al-Ittihad Jeddah
- 2007: Al-Nasr
- 2008: Al-Hilal
- 2008: Shandong Lions
- 2008–2009: Mahram Tehran
- 2009–2010: Saba Mehr Qazvin
- 2010: Duhok
- 2010: Chernomorets
- 2011: Levski Sofia
- 2011: Bucaneros de La Guaira
- 2011: Chabeb-Zahle
- 2014–2016: Oxford City Hoops

Career highlights
- Greek League All-Star (1996 I); 3× Bulgarian League champion (2003–2005); 2× Bulgarian Cup winner (2003, 2004)
- Stats at NBA.com
- Stats at Basketball Reference

Priest Lauderdale (born August 31, 1973) is an American-Bulgarian former professional basketball player.

== College career ==
Lauderdale attended high school at Carver Military Academy, in Chicago, Illinois. After high school, Lauderdale played college basketball at Central State University, in Wilberforce, Ohio, where he played with the Central State Marauders (1993–1994). Lauderdale also attended Kaskaskia College, in Centralia, Illinois, but he did not play competitive basketball while he was there.

== Professional career ==
After college, Lauderdale, a 7-foot-4-inch-tall (224 cm), 330-pound (150 kg) center, played professionally in the Greek Basket League. He played with Peristeri Athens during the 1995–96 season. He also played in the Greek League All-Star Game that season.

Lauderdale was selected in the first round, with the 28th overall pick of the 1996 NBA draft, by the Atlanta Hawks. Lauderdale saw action in 35 NBA regular-season games played with the Hawks in the 1996–97 season. He averaged 3.2 points, as well as 1.2 rebounds per contest, and he also played in three playoff games for Atlanta that season. He concluded his brief NBA career with the Denver Nuggets, in the 1997–98 season, for whom he averaged 3.7 points and 2.6 rebounds per game, in 39 games played for the team. Lauderdale also played with the Fort Wayne Fury, in the Continental Basketball Association, and with the Connecticut Pride, in the International Basketball League, during the 2000–01 season.

Lauderdale played professionally with the Bulgarian Basketball League club Lukoil Academic, from 2002 to 2005. While he was a member of the club, he received Bulgarian citizenship.

During his pro club career, Lauderdale also played in numerous other countries besides Greece and Bulgaria, including Venezuela, Cyprus, Saudi Arabia, Iran, the United Arab Emirates, China, Iraq, Lebanon and the United Kingdom.

== Coaching career ==
Lauderdale has worked as a basketball coach at youth camps in Germany.

== See also ==
- List of tallest players in National Basketball Association history
