= Randy Duck =

American basketball player (born 1975)

Personal information
- Born: February 11, 1975 (age 51) Texas, US
- Listed height: 6 ft 0 in (1.83 m)

Career information
- College: California Golden Bears (1993–1997)
- Position: Guard

Career history
- 1997: Ficosota Shumen
- 1997–1998: Tikveš Kavadarci
- 1998–1999: London Towers
- 1999: Idaho Stampede
- 2000: San Diego Stingrays
- 2000–2001: London Towers
- 2001–2002: Brighton Bears
- 2002: Oklahoma Storm
- 2002–2004: Brighton Bears

Randy Griffin Duck (born February 11, 1975) is a former American professional basketball player. He played college basketball for California Golden Bears.
