= Mire Chatman =

American basketball player (born 1978)

Personal information
- Born: October 24, 1978 (age 47) Garland, Texas, U.S.
- Listed height: 6 ft 2 in (1.88 m)
- Listed weight: 175 lb (79 kg)

Career information
- High school: South Garland (Garland, Texas)
- College: Freed-Hardeman (1998–1999); Southwestern Christian (1999–2000); Texas-Pan American (2000–2002)
- NBA draft: 2002: undrafted
- Playing career: 2002–2014
- Position: Point guard
- Number: 32

Career history
- 2002–2004: BK Ventspils
- 2004–2005: Pau Orthez
- 2005–2006: Dynamo Moscow
- 2006–2007: Lottomatica Roma
- 2007–2008: Triumph Lyubertsy
- 2008–2011: Beşiktaş Cola Turka
- 2011–2012: Pınar Karşıyaka
- 2012–2013: UNICS Kazan
- 2014: BK Ventspils

Career highlights
- ULEB Cup champion (2006); 2× LBL champion (2003, 2004); LBL All-Star (2003); 2× TBL All Star (2010, 2011)

Mire De Juan Chatman (born October 24, 1978) is an American former professional basketball player. Standing at 1.87 m (6 ft 2 in), he played at the point guard position. He is a Texas Pan American University alumnus who as an American became the all-time leading scorer as for Americans and the all-time leader in performance index rating of any player as to the history of Eurocup Basketball.

== College career ==
Mire Chatman played for Texas Pan American University from 2000 to 2002. During the 2001–02 season, Chatman racked up the accolades, earning All-American Honorable Mention, Independent Player of the Year, Independent Defensive Player of the Year while leading the Broncs to a 21–9 record. He ranked third in the NCAA in scoring average (26.2) and third in steals per game (3.6) and was inducted into his university's hall of fame.

== Professional career ==
Mire Chatman started his pro career in Latvia with BK Ventspils.

He made a name in Europe playing in the ULEB competitions (Euroleague, Uleb Cup) with BK Ventspils and Pau Orthez. A great passer, he led the 2004–05 Euroleague in assists with 6.2 per game.

In 2006–07 he joined Dynamo Moscow of Russia with which he won the ULEB Cup trophy. After starting another season in Dynamo he moved to Italy to play with Virtus Roma. but the following year he switched teams back to Russia to BC Triumph Lyubertsy for one of the largest contracts in European Basketball.

Chatman joined Beşiktaş Cola Turka for the 2008–09 season. He played there following two seasons as well. In the 2009–10 season with Besiktas, Chatman ranked within the top three players in scoring, assists and steals and played alongside Allen Iverson. In the 2011–12 season Chatman played for Pınar Karşıyaka and led the Turkish Basketball League in assists (6.4) while also being second in scoring (18.3) and fourth in steals (1.9).

In August 2012, he signed a one-year deal with UNICS Kazan.

In August 2014, after taking one season off, he returned to his first pro European team BK Ventspils. On November 26, 2014, he became the all-time leading scorer in Eurocup history. On December 17, 2014, Mire Chatman announced his retirement from basketball. He finished career as Eurocup's all-time leader in scoring and performance index rating.
