= EuroCup Basketball =

International men's basketball club tournament in Europe

BKT EuroCup
- Organising body: Euroleague Basketball
- Founded: 7 July 2002; 24 years ago
- First season: ULEB Cup; 2002–03; Eurocup; 2008–09; EuroCup; 2016–17
- Region: Europe
- Number of teams: 20
- Level on pyramid: 2
- Related competitions: EuroLeague (1st tier)
- Current champions: (France) Bourg (1st title) (2025–26)
- Most championships: (Spain) Valencia (4 titles)
- TV partners: euroleague.tv
- Website: euroleaguebasketball.net/eurocup
- 2026–27 EuroCup Basketball

EuroCup Basketball, commonly known as the EuroCup and currently called BKT EuroCup for sponsorship reasons, is an annual professional basketball club competition organized by Euroleague Basketball.

Founded as ULEB Cup in 2002, the competition lasted until 2008 when a new competition was introduced after an agreement between ULEB and FIBA under the name of EuroCup for the 2008–09 season, following a change in format. Given that the FIBA EuroChallenge was known as EuroCup until 2008, a new era of stronger cooperation between ULEB and FIBA Europe was set in 2008. The number of teams in the new competition was increased to a total of 48 and the winner of the 4th tier FIBA EuroCup Challenge, formerly known as EuroCup would get an automatic qualification for the tournament's following season, for first time.

Though initially advertised as a new competition, the ULEB Cup and EuroCup Basketball are now considered the same competition, with the change of name being simply a re-branding.

Since the 2021–22 season both EuroCup finalists qualify for next season's EuroLeague. Until then only the winner was entitled to the one year licence.

The title has been won by 16 clubs, 3 of which have won the title more than once. The most successful club in the competition are Valencia Basket, with four titles. The current champions are JL Bourg, winning their first title beating Beşiktaş in the 2026 Finals.

== History ==
The competition was created in 2002, as the ULEB Cup. In 2008 after an agreement with FIBA Europe the name changed to EuroCup, while the then 3d tier competition, FIBA EuroCup became known as EuroChallenge. The two finalists of the latter would earn promotion to EuroCup (2008-15).

It has had several names:

- 2002–03 to 2007–08 ULEB Cup
- 2008–09 to 2015–16 Eurocup
- 2016–17 to present EuroCup Basketball

=== Sponsorship names ===
On 7 July 2016, Chipita and Euroleague Basketball announced a strategic agreement to sponsor the European competition across the globe. According to the agreement, starting with the 2016–17 season, the competition would be named 7DAYS EuroCup. This title partnership was set to run for three seasons.

=== Logos ===
Evolution of the EuroCup logo
2002–2008	2008–2016	2016–2023	2023–present

== Qualification ==
Clubs qualify for the competition based on their performance in their domestic leagues competitions. For this purpose, the clubs from countries participating in the ABA League qualify for the competition based on their performance in the ABA League, and not their domestic leagues.

== Format ==
Starting with the 2026–27 season, the EuroCup's first phase, the Regular Season, includes 32 teams which are divided into 4 groups of 8 teams. Each team plays two games (home-and-away) against every other team in its group, and the 4 best teams of each group qualify to the Playoffs. Each playoff series is decided by a best-of-three format, and the winners of each series advance to the next round persistently until the Finals. Home advantage in the series goes to the best placed team in the regular season.

=== Previous EuroCup formats ===
Historically, the competition began with a group phase in which the starting field was reduced to 16 teams. The survivors then advanced to a knockout phase. In the inaugural 2002–03 season, the knockout phase consisted entirely of two-legged ties. In the following 2003–04 season, the final became a one-off game, but all other knockout ties remained two-legged.

In the 2007–08 season, the initial phase, now called the Regular Season, was only used to reduce the field to 32 teams. The survivors were paired into two-legged knockout ties, with the winners advancing to another set of two-legged ties. The survivors then entered the first-ever Final Eight phase in the competition's history, consisting of one-off knockout games.

The following 2008–09 season, was the first in which preliminary rounds were conducted. That year saw two preliminary rounds held, the first involving 16 teams, and the second involving the eight winners, plus eight teams that had received byes into that round. The survivors of the second preliminary round joined 24 direct qualifiers in the Regular Season. This season also saw the introduction of the Last 16 group phase, and proved to be the last for the Final Eight.

The last stage of the EuroCup, the EuroCup Finals, was reduced from eight teams to four, starting with the 2009–10 season. This stage was directly analogous to the EuroLeague Final Four, and like that stage of the EuroLeague, consisted of one-off knockout semifinals, followed by a single-game final. Unlike the EuroLeague Final Four, in which the third-place game and final are held two days after the semifinals, the corresponding games of the EuroCup were held the day after the semifinals.

In the 2012–13 season, the final was decided by a single game format, after double-legged semifinals and quarterfinals. For the 2013–14 season, the competition increased from 32 to 48 teams in the Regular Season phase. Another innovation that started in the 2013–14 season, was that the clubs were divided into two regional conferences, the Eastern Conference and the Western Conference, for the Regular Season phase. The size of the groups grew to six teams, where the first three qualified teams joined the Last 32 stage. In addition, the eight EuroLeague clubs that did not qualify for the EuroLeague Top 16 phase, joined the remaining 24 EuroCup teams and the Finals were decided by a double-legged series.

For the 2014–15 season, the competition contained 36 teams at the group stage. There were 6 groups, each containing 6 teams. The 36 teams consisted of the 7 teams that were eliminated in the 2014–15 Euroleague season qualification rounds, and 29 teams that qualified directly to the 2014–15 EuroCup, either through 2013–14 season results, or through wild cards. The top four teams from each of the Regular Season groups with the eight EuroLeague clubs that did not qualify for the EuroLeague Top 16 phase qualified to join the Last 32 stage. For the 2015–16 season, the competition contained 36 clubs automatically entered into the Regular Season and the eight EuroLeague clubs that did not qualify for the EuroLeague Top 16 phase qualified to join the Last 32 stage.

For the 2016–17 season, the EuroCup's first phase was the Regular Season, in which 20 teams participate. The participants included 20 clubs automatically entered into the Regular Season. Each team played two games (home-and-away) against every other team in its group. At the end of the Regular Season, the field was cut from 20 to 16. The next phase, known as the Top 16, then begins, featuring the 16 survivors of the Regular Season in four-team groups. As in the Regular Season, each Top 16 group was contest in a double round-robin format. The group winners and runners-up advanced to the third phase, the Playoffs. Each playoff series was best-of-three, and the winners of each series advance to the next round persistently until the Finals. Home advantage in the series went to the best placed team in the Top 16. The Finals featured the two remaining series winners in a best-of-three series with home advantage in the series to the best placed team in the Top 16.

=== Arena standards ===
Effective as of the 2012–13 season, all EuroCup clubs must host their home games in arenas that have a regular seating capacity of at least 2,500 (all seated), and an additional minimum capacity of 200 VIP seats available. By comparison, EuroLeague licensed clubs host their home games in arenas that seat at least 10,000 people, while EuroLeague associated clubs must have arenas that seat 5,000.

== Results ==
Year	Final			Semifinalists		
Year	Champion	Score	Second place	Third place	Score	Fourth place
2002–03; Details	(Spain); Valencia	168–154 (78–90 / 78–76)	(Slovenia); Krka	(Spain) Adecco Estudiantes and (Spain) Joventut		
2003–04; Details	(Israel); Hapoel Jerusalem	83–72	(Spain); Real Madrid	(Spain) Adecco Estudiantes and (Serbia and Montenegro) Reflex		
2004–05; Details	(Lithuania); Lietuvos rytas	78–74	(Greece); Makedonikos	(Serbia and Montenegro) Hemofarm and (Spain) Valencia		
2005–06; Details	(Russia); Dynamo Moscow	73–60	(Greece); Aris	(Serbia and Montenegro) Hemofarm and (Israel) Hapoel Jerusalem		
2006–07; Details	(Spain); Real Madrid	87–75	(Lithuania); Lietuvos rytas	(Serbia) FMP and (Russia) UNICS		
2007–08; Details	(Spain); Joventut	79–54	(Spain); Girona	(Russia); Dynamo	84–67	(Turkey); Galatasaray
2008–09; Details	(Lithuania); Lietuvos rytas	80–74	(Russia); Khimki	(Serbia) Hemofarm and (Spain) Bilbao		
2009–10; Details	(Spain); Valencia	67–44	(Germany); Alba	(Spain); Bilbao	76–67	(Greece); Panellinios
2010–11; Details	(Russia); UNICS	92–77	(Spain); Cajasol	(Croatia); Cedevita	59–57	(Italy); Benetton
2011–12; Details	(Russia); Khimki	77–68	(Spain); Valencia	(Lithuania); Rytas Vilnius	71–62	(Russia); Saint Petersburg
2012–13; Details	(Russia); Lokomotiv Kuban	75–64	(Spain); Bilbao	(Ukraine) Budivelnyk and (Spain) Valencia		
2013–14; Details	(Spain); Valencia	165–140 (80–67 / 73–85)	(Russia); UNICS	(Serbia) Crvena zvezda and (Russia) Nizhny Novgorod		
2014–15; Details	(Russia); Khimki	174–130 (66–91 / 83–64)	(Spain); Gran Canaria	(Turkey) Banvit and (Russia) UNICS		
2015–16; Details	(Turkey); Galatasaray	140–133 (66–62 / 78–67)	(France); Strasbourg	(Italy) Trento and (Spain) Gran Canaria		
2016–17; Details	(Spain); Unicaja	2–1 (68–62 / 79–71 / 58–63)	(Spain); Valencia	(Israel) Hapoel Jerusalem and (Russia) Lokomotiv Kuban		
2017–18; Details	(Turkey); Darüşşafaka	2–0 (78–81 / 67–59)	(Russia); Lokomotiv Kuban	(Germany) Bayern Munich and (Italy) Reggio Emilia		
2018–19; Details	(Spain); Valencia	2–1 (89–75 / 95–92 / 89–63)	(Germany); Alba	Andorra and (Russia) UNICS		
2019–20; Details	Cancelled due to the COVID-19 pandemic in Europe					
2020–21; Details	(France); Monaco	2–0 (89–87 / 83–86)	(Russia); UNICS	(Spain) Gran Canaria and (Italy) Virtus		
2021–22; Details	(Italy); Virtus Bologna	80–67	(Turkey); Bursaspor	(Spain) Andorra and (Spain) Valencia		
2022–23; Details	(Spain); Gran Canaria	71–67	(Turkey); Türk Telekom	(Spain) Joventut and (Ukraine) Prometey		
2023–24; Details	(France); Paris	2–0 (77–64 / 81–89)	(France); Bourg	(Turkey) Beşiktaş and (United Kingdom) London Lions		
2024–25; Details	(Israel); Hapoel Tel Aviv	2–0 (74–65 / 94–103)	(Spain); Dreamland Gran Canaria	(Turkey) Bahçeşehir Koleji and (Spain) Valencia Basket		
2025–26; Details	(France); Bourg	2–0 (60–72 / 73–71)	(Turkey); Beşiktaş	(Turkey) Bahçeşehir Koleji and (Turkey) Türk Telekom		

== Awards ==
After a given EuroCup season, before the finals, annual EuroCup awards are handed out to players and coaches. These awards include:

- Most Valuable Player
- Finals MVP
- Rising Star
- Coach of the Year
- All-EuroCup Team

== Performance by club ==
Map of countries, teams from which have reached the regular season of the EuroCup Basketball. Country that has been represented in the regular season Not represented

A total number of 179 clubs from 30 countries have participated in the competition.

Club	Winners	Runners-up	Years won	Years runner-up
(Spain) Valencia Basket	4	2	2002–03, 2009–10, 2013–14, 2018–19	2011–12, 2016–17
(Lithuania) Rytas	2	1	2004–05, 2008–09	2006–07
(Russia) Khimki	2	1	2011–12, 2014–15	2008–09
(Russia) UNICS	1	2	2010–11	2013–14, 2020–21
(Spain) Gran Canaria	1	2	2022–23	2014–15, 2024–25
(Spain) Real Madrid	1	1	2006–07	2003–04
(Russia) Lokomotiv Kuban	1	1	2012–13	2017–18
(France) Bourg	1	1	2025–26	2023–24
(Israel) Hapoel Jerusalem	1	0	2003–04	–
(Russia) Dynamo Moscow	1	0	2005–06	–
(Spain) Joventut	1	0	2007–08	–
(Turkey) Galatasaray	1	0	2015–16	–
(Spain) Málaga	1	0	2016–17	–
(Turkey) Darüşşafaka	1	0	2017–18	–
(France) Monaco	1	0	2020–21	–
(Italy) Virtus Bologna	1	0	2021–22	–
(France) Paris	1	0	2023–24	–
(Israel) Hapoel Tel Aviv	1	0	2024–25	–
(Germany) Alba Berlin	0	2	–	2009–10, 2018–19
(Slovenia) Krka	0	1	–	2002–03
(Greece) Makedonikos	0	1	–	2004–05
(Greece) Aris	0	1	–	2005–06
(Spain) Girona	0	1	–	2007–08
(Spain) Real Betis	0	1	–	2010–11
(Spain) Bilbao	0	1	–	2012–13
(France) Strasbourg	0	1	–	2015–16
(Turkey) Bursapor	0	1	–	2021–22
(Turkey) Türk Telekom	0	1	–	2022–23
(Turkey) Beşiktaş	0	1	–	2025–26

== Performance by country ==
Rank	Nation	Champion	Finalist
1.	Spain	8 Valencia (4), Real Madrid (1), Joventut (1), Málaga (1), Gran Canaria (1)	7 Valencia (2), Real Madrid (1), Girona (1), Real Betis (1), Bilbao (1), Gran Canaria (1)
2.	Russia	5 Khimki (2), Dynamo Moscow (1), UNICS (1), Lokomotiv Kuban (1)	4 UNICS (2), Khimki (1), Lokomotiv Kuban (1)
3.	France	3 Bourg (1), Monaco (1), Paris (1)	2 Strasbourg (1), Bourg (1)
4.	Turkey	2 Galatasaray (1), Darüşşafaka (1)	3 Beşiktaş (1), Bursaspor (1), Türk Telekom (1)
5.	Lithuania	2 Rytas (2)	1 Rytas (1)
6.	Israel	2 Hapoel Jerusalem (1), Hapoel Tel Aviv (1)	—
7.	Italy	1 Virtus Bologna (1)	—
8.	Greece	—	2 Makedonikos (1), Aris (1)
-	Germany	—	2 Alba Berlin (2)
10.	Slovenia	—	1 Krka (1)

== Statistical leaders and individual high performances ==
=== All-time leaders ===
	Average		Totals	
Points	(Serbia) Igor Rakočević	19.05	(Montenegro) Bojan Dubljević	1,217
Rebounds	(Montenegro) Vladimir Golubović	8.39	(Belarus) Vladimir Veremeenko	609
Assists	(Montenegro) Omar Cook	6.44	(Serbia) Stefan Marković	491
Steals	(United States) Jerry McCullough	2.82	(United States) Mire Chatman	167
Blocks	(United States) Andre Riddick	1.77	(United States) Andre Riddick	147
Index Ratings	(Turkey) Michael Wright	22.14	(United States) Mire Chatman	1,472

=== Highest attendance records ===
- 24,232 attendance for Red Star Belgrade in a 79–70 win over Budivelnyk Kyiv, at Kombank Arena, Belgrade, on 26 March 2014.
- 22,736 attendance for Red Star Belgrade in a 63–52 win over UNICS Kazan, at Kombank Arena, Belgrade, on 2 April 2014.

== Sponsors ==
=== Title sponsor ===
- BKT (formerly 7Days)

=== Premium partners ===
- Turkish Airlines
- Tempobet (only in Germany)
- Fonbet (only in Russia)
- Nesine (only in Turkey)
- betfair (only in Spain)
- sportingbet (only in Greece)
- Adidas

=== Global partners ===
- Spalding
- Odeabank (only in Turkey)
- Head & Shoulders (only in Turkey)
- SEK (only in Turkey)
- Oscar Mayer (only in Spain)
- Endesa (only in Spain)

== See also ==
=== Men's competitions ===
- EuroLeague
- EuroLeague SuperCup
- Basketball Champions League
- FIBA Europe Cup

=== Women's competitions ===
- EuroLeague Women
- EuroCup Women
- FIBA Europe SuperCup Women
