= Lexi =

Lexi and Lexie are given names, as well as nicknames of people with names starting with "Alex" or another variation of the name "Lex" (such as Alexis, Alexandra, Alexandria, Alexander, Alexandre, Alexa, Alexia, Alexi, Lexus, Lexine etc.). Both forms usually, but not exclusively, refer to a female name.

Lexy is a similar name.

Notable people with these names include:

== Lexi ==
=== Female ===
- Lexie Adzija (born 2000), Canadian ice hockey player
- Lexie Agresti (born 1995), French art historian and transgender rights activist
- Lexi Ainsworth (born 1992), American actress
- Lexi Alexander (born 1974), German-Palestinian filmmaker and martial artist
- Lexi Allen (born 1967), American gospel singer, producer, actress, comedian, television personality, and screenwriter
- Lexi Atkins (born 1993), American actress, model, and beauty pageant titleholder
- Lexi Bender (born 1993), American NWHL player
- Lexi Berg, Swedish-American singer and songwriter
- Lexi Boling (born 1993), American fashion model
- Lexi Brumback (born 2000), American cheerleader and television personality
- Lexi Davis (born 1994), American softball coach and former player
- Lexi Donarski (born 2002), American college basketball player
- Lexi duPont (born 1989), American professional big mountain freeskier
- Lexi Fernandez (born 1995), Filipino actress, host, singer, and dancer
- Lexi Freiman (born c. 1983), Australian writer
- Lexi Gonzales (born 2000), Filipino actress, host, model, singer, and dancer
- Lexi Hamilton (born 2000), Australian AFLW player
- Lexi Held (born 1999), American basketball player
- Lexi Jayde (born 2002), American singer-songwriter and actress
- Lexi Lane (born 1986), American professional wrestler
- Lexi Lawin, American dancer
- Lexi Lawson, American actress and singer
- Lexi Lloyd-Smith (born 2003), English professional footballer
- Lexi Love (born 1990), American drag performer
- Lexi Missimo (born 2003), American former college soccer player
- Lexi Peters, American ice hockey player
- Lexi Potter (born 2006), English professional footballer
- Lexi Randall (born 1980), American former child actress in film and television
- Lexi Reese, American investor, former Google executive, and candidate in the 2024 United States Senate elections in California
- Lexi Rodriguez (born 2003), American professional volleyball player
- Lexi Smith (born 1996), American softball coach and former player
- Lexi Thompson (born 1995), American professional golfer
- Lexi Underwood, American actress and singer
- Lexi Valentine, Canadian past member of indie rock band Magneta Lane
- Lexi VonderLieth (born 1984), American professional surfer
- Lexi Weeks (born 1996), American pole vaulter
- Lexi Wilson (born 1993), Bahamian beauty pageant titleholder
- Lexi Zeiss (born 2005), American artistic gymnast

== Lexie ==
=== Male ===
- Lexie Tynan (1933–2022), Irish athlete and rugby union player

=== Female ===
- Lexie Adzija (born 2000), Canadian PWHL player
- Lexie Alford (born 1998), American adventure traveler, photographer, blogger, and YouTube personality
- Lexie Brown (born 1994), American WNBA player
- Lexie Contursi (born 1989), American film- and television actress
- Lexie Crooke, Australian former professional tennis player
- Lexie Dean Robertson (1893–1954), American teacher and poet
- Lexie Elkins (born 1995), American softball coach and former player
- Lexie Elliott, Scottish mystery- and thriller author
- Lexie Feeney (born 1989), Australian archer
- Lexie Fyfe (born 1969), American professional wrestler
- Lexie Hull (born 1999), American WNBA player
- Lexie Laing (born 1996), American former PHF player
- Lexie Liu (born 1998), Chinese singer, rapper, and songwriter
- Lexie Matheson (born 1944/1945), New Zealand transgender activist, entertainer, and educator
- Lexie Millard (born 1993), American professional racing cyclist
- Lexie Pickering (born 2001), Australian field hockey player
- Lexie Priessman (born 1997), American former artistic gymnast
- Lexie Roth, American actress
- Lexie Stevens (born 1999), Dutch inactive tennis player

== Fictional characters ==
- Lexi Bunny, in the US superhero animated TV series Loonatics Unleashed, voiced by Jessica DiCicco
- Lexi Calder, in the UK TV soap opera Hollyoaks, played by Natalie Anderson
- Lexie Carver, in the US TV soap opera Days of Our Lives, played by Cyndi James Gossett, Angelique Francis, Shellye Broughton, Renée Jones, and Jennifer Lee
- Lexi Franklin, in the UK TV soap opera Coronation Street, played by Jasmine Fish
- Lexie Grey, in the US medical drama TV series Grey's Anatomy, played by Chyler Leigh
- Lexi Howard, in the US teen drama TV series Euphoria, played by Maude Apatow
- Lexi King, in the UK TV soap opera Emmerdale, played by Sally Oliver
- Lexi Kubota, in the US animated TV series Glitch Techs, voiced by Haley Tju
- Lexi Lopez, in the Disney Jr. program Lights, Camera, Lexi
- Lexie MacDonald, in the UK drama TV series Monarch of the Glen, played by Dawn Steele
- Lexi Pearce, in the UK TV soap opera EastEnders, played by Dotti-Beau Cotterill and Isabella Brown
- Lexi Reed, in the US teen sitcom A.N.T. Farm, played by Stefanie Scott
- Lexi Roscoe, in the UK TV soap opera Hollyoaks, played by Marnie Fletcher
- Lexi Sterling, in the US prime time TV soap opera Melrose Place, played by Jamie Luner
- Lexi Walker, in the US nighttime soap opera Fashion House, played by Erika Schaefer

== See also ==
- Lexii Alijai (1998–2020), American rapper, singer, and songwriter
