= 2025 EuroCup Basketball Playoffs =

Europe secondary club basketball tournament

The 2025 EuroCup Basketball Playoffs began on 4 March with the eighthfinals and ended on 11 April 2025 with the Finals to decide the champions of the 2024–25 EuroCup Basketball. A total of 12 teams from eight countries competed in the playoffs.

Times are CET/CEST, (Note: CET (UTC+1) for dates up to 28 March 2025 (eighthfinals, quarterfinals and first two legs of semifinals), and CEST (UTC+2) for dates thereafter (third leg of semifinals and finals).) as listed by Euroleague Basketball (local times, if different, are in parentheses).

== Format ==
In the playoffs, teams will play against each other in a knockout tournament into four rounds from eighthfinals to finals. At the end of the regular season, the six teams from each group with the most wins qualified for the playoffs. The two top teams from each regular season group receive a bye and qualify directly to the quarterfinals. The remaining eight qualified teams will enter the eighthfinals to compete in a single-game format in which the third-placed teams of each group will face off against the sixth-placed teams of the opposite groups and the fourth-placed teams of each group will face off against the fifth-placed teams of the opposite groups. The four winning teams from eighthfinals will enter the quarterfinals to face off in a single-game format in the home of the two top teams from each regular season group. The higher-placed regular season team in each matchup will enjoy home court advantage in eighthfinals and quarterfinals. From semifinals onwards, teams will play in best-of-three series with the first leg and third leg, if necessary, in the home court of the higher-placed regular season team to crown the EuroCup champion.

== Qualified teams ==
Pos	Group A	Group B	Qualification
1	(Turkish Basketball Federation) Bahçeşehir Koleji	(Spanish Basketball Federation) Valencia Basket	Advance to quarterfinals
2	(Israeli Basketball Association) Hapoel Shlomo Tel Aviv	(Israeli Basketball Association) Hapoel Bank Yahav Jerusalem	Advance to quarterfinals
3	(Spanish Basketball Federation) Dreamland Gran Canaria	(Turkish Basketball Federation) Türk Telekom	Advance to eighthfinals
4	(Lithuanian Basketball Federation) Wolves Twinsbet	(Basketball Federation of Slovenia) Cedevita Olimpija	Advance to eighthfinals
5	(Turkish Basketball Federation) Beşiktaş Fibabanka	(Romanian Basketball Federation) U-BT Cluj-Napoca	Advance to eighthfinals
6	(Basketball Federation of Montenegro) Budućnost VOLI	(Italian Basketball Federation) Umana Reyer Venezia	Advance to eighthfinals

Source: EuroCup

== Bracket ==
Eighthfinals
(Basketball Federation of Slovenia) Cedevita Olimpija	96
(Turkish Basketball Federation) Beşiktaş Fibabanka	86
(Spanish Basketball Federation) Dreamland Gran Canaria	84
(Italian Basketball Federation) Umana Reyer Venezia	80
(Lithuanian Basketball Federation) Wolves Twinsbet	99
(Romanian Basketball Federation) U-BT Cluj-Napoca	100
(Turkish Basketball Federation) Türk Telekom	93
(Basketball Federation of Montenegro) Budućnost VOLI	73

Quarterfinals
(Turkish Basketball Federation) Bahçeşehir Koleji	85
(Basketball Federation of Slovenia) Cedevita Olimpija	81
(Israeli Basketball Association) Hapoel Bank Yahav Jerusalem	89
(Spanish Basketball Federation) Dreamland Gran Canaria	92
(Spanish Basketball Federation) Valencia Basket	98
(Romanian Basketball Federation) U-BT Cluj-Napoca	74
(Israeli Basketball Association) Hapoel Shlomo Tel Aviv	67
(Turkish Basketball Federation) Türk Telekom	61

Semifinals
(Turkish Basketball Federation) Bahçeşehir Koleji	74	68	72	1
(Spanish Basketball Federation) Dreamland Gran Canaria	66	69	76	2
(Spanish Basketball Federation) Valencia Basket	91	91	92	1
(Israeli Basketball Association) Hapoel Shlomo Tel Aviv	82	96	94	2

Finals
(Spanish Basketball Federation) Dreamland Gran Canaria	65	94	–	0
(Israeli Basketball Association) Hapoel Shlomo Tel Aviv	74	103	–	2

== Eighthfinals ==
=== Summary ===
The eighthfinals was played on 4–5 March 2025.

Home team	Score	Away team
Dreamland Gran Canaria (Spanish Basketball Federation)	84–80	(Italian Basketball Federation) Umana Reyer Venezia
Cedevita Olimpija (Basketball Federation of Slovenia)	96–86	(Turkish Basketball Federation) Beşiktaş Fibabanka
Türk Telekom (Turkish Basketball Federation)	93–73	(Basketball Federation of Montenegro) Budućnost VOLI
Wolves Twinsbet (Lithuanian Basketball Federation)	99–100	(Romanian Basketball Federation) U-BT Cluj-Napoca

=== Matches ===
4 March 2025	Wolves Twinsbet (Lithuanian Basketball Federation)	99–100(OT)	(Romanian Basketball Federation) U-BT Cluj-Napoca	Vilnius, Lithuania
18:00	Scoring by quarter: 33–20, 15–19, 16–18, 17–24, Overtime: 9–9, 9–10
	Pts: Cowan Jr. 23; Rebs: Brooks 10; Asts: Cowan Jr. 12; PIR: Cowan Jr. 27	Boxscore	Pts: Simpson 26; Rebs: Stephens 10; Asts: Simpson 14; PIR: Simpson 28	Arena: Twinsbet Arena; Attendance: 4,416; Referees: Miloš Koljenšić, Alberto Baena, Thomas Bissuel

5 March 2025	Türk Telekom (Turkish Basketball Federation)	93–73	(Basketball Federation of Montenegro) Budućnost VOLI	Ankara, Turkey
17:30	Scoring by quarter: 26–11, 22–25, 14–17, 31–20
	Pts: Brown 20; Rebs: Alexander 6 Asts: Smith 8 PIR: Alexander 24	Boxscore	Pts: Magee 16; Rebs: Kamenjaš, Wright IV 7 Asts: Wright IV 6 PIR: Kamenjaš 14	Arena: Ankara Arena; Attendance: 6,217; Referees: Oļegs Latiševs, Carlos Cortés, Eduard Udyanskyy

5 March 2025	Cedevita Olimpija (Basketball Federation of Slovenia)	96–86	(Turkish Basketball Federation) Beşiktaş Fibabanka	Ljubljana, Slovenia
19:30	Scoring by quarter: 23–24, 19–25, 26–20, 28–17
	Pts: Robinson 21; Rebs: Robinson 12; Asts: Jones 5 PIR: Robinson 30	Boxscore	Pts: Mathews 18; Rebs: Plavšić 8 Asts: Allman 14; PIR: Allman 24	Arena: Arena Stožice; Attendance: 7,029; Referees: Juan Carlos García, Seffi Shemmesh, Marcin Kowalski

5 March 2025	Dreamland Gran Canaria (Spanish Basketball Federation)	84–80	(Italian Basketball Federation) Umana Reyer Venezia	Las Palmas, Spain
21:00	Scoring by quarter: 25–16, 21–23, 17–23, 21–18
	Pts: Ngouama 18; Rebs: Tobey 7 Asts: Albicy 5 PIR: Ngouama 21	Boxscore	Pts: three players 15; Rebs: Kabengele 12; Asts: Ennis 5 PIR: Ennis 23	Arena: Gran Canaria Arena; Attendance: 5,297; Referees: Rain Peerandi, Sérgio Silva, Uroš Obrknežević

== Quarterfinals ==
=== Summary ===
The quarterfinals was played on 11–12 March 2025.

Home team	Score	Away team
Bahçeşehir Koleji (Turkish Basketball Federation)	85–81	(Basketball Federation of Slovenia) Cedevita Olimpija
Hapoel Bank Yahav Jerusalem (Israeli Basketball Association)	89–92	(Spanish Basketball Federation) Dreamland Gran Canaria
Valencia Basket (Spanish Basketball Federation)	98–74	(Romanian Basketball Federation) U-BT Cluj-Napoca
Hapoel Shlomo Tel Aviv (Israeli Basketball Association)	67–61	(Turkish Basketball Federation) Türk Telekom

=== Matches ===
11 March 2025	Bahçeşehir Koleji (Turkish Basketball Federation)	85–81	(Basketball Federation of Slovenia) Cedevita Olimpija	Istanbul, Turkey
18:00	Scoring by quarter: 7–24, 31–22, 18–19, 29–16
	Pts: Simonović 20; Rebs: Ponitka, Cavanaugh 6 Asts: Smith 7 PIR: Simonović 27	Boxscore	Pts: Tasić 14; Rebs: Robinson 5 Asts: Nikolić, Stipanović 5 PIR: Robinson 14	Arena: Sinan Erdem Dome; Attendance: 10,582; Referees: Ioannis Foufis, Robert Vyklický, Steve Bittner

11 March 2025	Hapoel Bank Yahav Jerusalem (Israeli Basketball Association)	89–92	(Spanish Basketball Federation) Dreamland Gran Canaria	Belgrade, Serbia
20:00	Scoring by quarter: 21–25, 23–17, 14–28, 31–22
	Pts: Harper 24; Rebs: Carrington, Johnson 5 Asts: Harper 5 PIR: Harper 29	Boxscore	Pts: Homesley 21; Rebs: Tobey 8 Asts: Albicy, Brussino 4 PIR: Homesley 23	Arena: Aleksandar Nikolić Hall; Attendance: 189; Referees: Gytis Vilius, Vasiliki Tsaroucha, Mario Majkić

12 March 2025	Valencia Basket (Spanish Basketball Federation)	98–74	(Romanian Basketball Federation) U-BT Cluj-Napoca	Valencia, Spain
20:30	Scoring by quarter: 30–15, 23–21, 17–16, 28–22
	Pts: Jones 14; Rebs: Costello, Pradilla 7 Asts: Jones 9 PIR: Jones 18	Boxscore	Pts: three players 12; Rebs: Hankins 13; Asts: Simpson 10; PIR: Hankins 23	Arena: La Fonteta; Attendance: 6,722; Referees: Borys Ryzhyk, Anne Panther, Leandro Lezcano

12 March 2025	Hapoel Shlomo Tel Aviv (Israeli Basketball Association)	67–61	(Turkish Basketball Federation) Türk Telekom	Samokov, Bulgaria
18:00	Scoring by quarter: 20–15, 8–11, 24–19, 15–16
	Pts: Foster 21; Rebs: Foster 8 Asts: Madar 4 PIR: Foster 15	Boxscore	Pts: Hanlan 17; Rebs: Bess, Brown 7 Asts: Angola, Brown 3 PIR: Hanlan 22	Arena: Arena Samokov; Attendance: 930; Referees: Miguel Ángel Pérez, Sašo Petek, Kristaps Konstantinovs

== Semifinals ==
=== Summary ===
The first legs was played on 25 March, the second legs on 28 March and the third legs on 2 April 2025.

Team 1	Series	Team 2	1st leg	2nd leg	3rd leg
Bahçeşehir Koleji (Turkish Basketball Federation)	1–2	(Spanish Basketball Federation) Dreamland Gran Canaria	74–66	68–69	72–76
Valencia Basket (Spanish Basketball Federation)	1–2	(Israeli Basketball Association) Hapoel Shlomo Tel Aviv	91–82	91–96	92–94

=== First leg ===
25 March 2025	Bahçeşehir Koleji (Turkish Basketball Federation)	74–66	(Spanish Basketball Federation) Dreamland Gran Canaria	Istanbul
18:00	Scoring by quarter: 27–21, 22–16, 13–15, 12–14
	Pts: Simonović 20; Rebs: Cavanaugh, Simonović 8 Asts: Sipahi, Smith 6 PIR: Simonović 29	Boxscore	Pts: Tobey 14; Rebs: Conditt IV 6 Asts: Albicy 4 PIR: Tobey 18	Arena: Sinan Erdem Dome; Attendance: 11,175; Referees: Saša Pukl, Jakub Zamojski, Josip Radojković

25 March 2025	Valencia Basket (Spanish Basketball Federation)	91–82	(Israeli Basketball Association) Hapoel Shlomo Tel Aviv	Valencia
20:30	Scoring by quarter: 20–24, 22–24, 23–11, 26–23
	Pts: Montero 24; Rebs: Costello 8 Asts: Jones 6 PIR: Montero 26	Boxscore	Pts: Foster, Madar 20; Rebs: Madar 8 Asts: Madar, Yaacov 4 PIR: Madar 24	Arena: Font de Sant Lluís; Attendance: 6,969; Referees: Damir Javor, Luka Kardum, Hugues Thepenier

=== Second leg ===
28 March 2025	Hapoel Shlomo Tel Aviv (Israeli Basketball Association)	96–91	(Spanish Basketball Federation) Valencia Basket	Samokov
18:30	Scoring by quarter: 23–21, 31–28, 22–22, 20–20
	Pts: Motley 26; Rebs: Ginat, Motley 8 Asts: Madar 9 PIR: Motley 32	Boxscore	Pts: Costello 21; Rebs: Pradilla 5 Asts: Montero 9 PIR: Costello 24	Arena: Arena Samokov; Attendance: 1,950; Referees: Milivoje Jovčić, Artūras Šukys, Maxime Boubert

28 March 2025	Dreamland Gran Canaria (Spanish Basketball Federation)	69–68	(Turkish Basketball Federation) Bahçeşehir Koleji	Las Palmas
21:00	Scoring by quarter: 24–21, 17–15, 11–14, 17–18
	Pts: Brussino 18; Rebs: Tobey 8 Asts: Albicy 4 PIR: Tobey 20	Boxscore	Pts: Korkmaz 12; Rebs: Ponitka 5 Asts: Smith 5 PIR: Ponitka 20	Arena: Gran Canaria Arena; Referees: Carmelo Paternicò, Saulius Račys, Michele Rossi

=== Third leg ===
2 April 2025	Bahçeşehir Koleji (Turkish Basketball Federation)	72–76	(Spanish Basketball Federation) Dreamland Gran Canaria	Istanbul
18:00	Scoring by quarter: 18–19, 24–22, 15–19, 15–16
	Pts: Smith 22; Rebs: Odiase, Ponitka 4 Asts: Hazer 6 PIR: Odiase 21	Boxscore	Pts: Homesley 19; Rebs: Brussino 4 Asts: Albicy, Homesley 4 PIR: Tobey 16	Arena: Sinan Erdem Dome; Attendance: 3,511; Referees: Tomislav Hordov, Sašo Petek, Guido Giovanetti

2 April 2025	Valencia Basket (Spanish Basketball Federation)	92–94	(Israeli Basketball Association) Hapoel Shlomo Tel Aviv	Valencia
20:30	Scoring by quarter: 22–15, 23–29, 22–19, 25–31
	Pts: Badio 20; Rebs: Pradilla 6 Asts: Montero 7 PIR: Badio 23	Boxscore	Pts: Blakeney 32; Rebs: Blakeney 9 Asts: Madar, Motley 3 PIR: Blakeney 30	Arena: Font de Sant Lluís; Attendance: 7,072; Referees: Robert Lottermoser, Rain Peerandi, Igor Dragojević

== Finals ==
=== Summary ===
The first legs will be played on 8 April, the second legs on 11 April and the third legs on 16 April 2025, if necessary.

Team 1	Series	Team 2	1st leg	2nd leg	3rd leg
Hapoel Shlomo Tel Aviv (Israeli Basketball Association)	2–0	(Spanish Basketball Federation) Dreamland Gran Canaria	74–65	103–94	—

=== First leg ===
8 April 2024	Hapoel Shlomo Tel Aviv (Israeli Basketball Association)	74–65	(Spanish Basketball Federation) Dreamland Gran Canaria	Samokov
19:30	Scoring by quarter: 22–20, 17–16, 21–14, 14–15
	Pts: Motley 18; Rebs: Ginat 8 Asts: Madar 5 PIR: Motley 19	Boxscore	Pts: Conditt IV 12; Rebs: Conditt IV 8 Asts: Homesley 6 PIR: Homesley 17	Arena: Arena Samokov; Attendance: 2,000; Referees: Damir Javor, Gytis Vilius, Thomas Bissuel

=== Second leg ===
11 April 2024	Dreamland Gran Canaria (Spanish Basketball Federation)	94–103	(Israeli Basketball Association) Hapoel Shlomo Tel Aviv	Las Palmas
21:00	Scoring by quarter: 21–29, 23–24, 30–33, 20–17
	Pts: Conditt IV 18; Rebs: Brussino 7 Asts: Albicy, Thomasson 4 PIR: Conditt IV 21	Boxscore	Pts: Blakeney 27; Rebs: Blakeney 6 Asts: Madar 6 PIR: Blakeney 31	Arena: Gran Canaria Arena; Attendance: 7,941; Referees: Ilija Belosevic, Ioannis Foufis, Steve Bittner

== See also ==
- 2025 EuroLeague Playoffs
- 2024–25 EuroCup Basketball
