= Agresti =

Agresti is an Italian surname. Notable people with the surname include:

- Alan Agresti (born 1947), American statistician
- Alejandro Agresti (born 1961), Argentine filmmaker and producer
- Lexie Agresti (born 1995), French art historian and transgender rights activist
- Livio Agresti (1508–1580), Italian painter
- Olivia Rossetti Agresti (1875–1960), English activist, author, editor, and interpreter
- Sabrina Agresti-Roubache (born 1976), French politician
