= Erik Berglöf =

Swedish economist (born 1957)

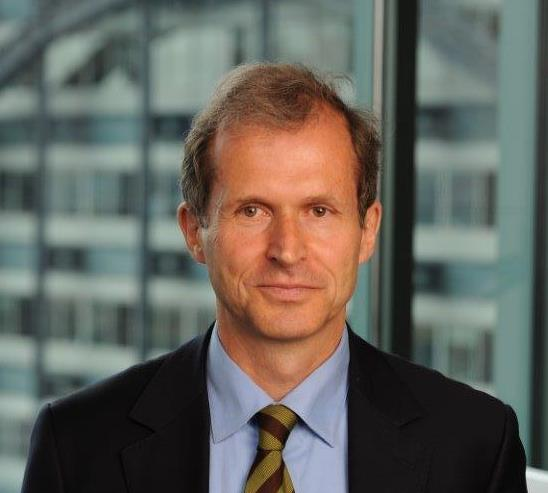
Erik Berglöf Director of the LSE Institute of Global Affairs

Erik Berglöf (born 1957) is a Swedish economist, currently the Chief Economist of the Asian Infrastructure Investment Bank (AIIB), the Beijing-based multilateral development bank established in 2016 with a mission to improve social and economic outcomes in Asia. In March 2019 Erik Berglöf was appointed to the European Council's High Level Group of Wise Persons on the European financial architecture for development where Berglöf and eight other economists will suggest changes to the EU's development finance structure. In 2017–2018 Erik Berglöf served on the secretariat of the G20 Eminent Persons Group on Global Financial Governance and on the Governing Board of the Institute for New Economic Thinking in New York.

Currently, Erik Berglöf is also a non-resident Senior Fellow at the Brookings Institution in Washington, D.C., Board Member and Research Fellow of the European Corporate Governance Institute in Brussels, and Executive Board Member of the New Economic School in Moscow, research fellow and former programme director at the Centre for Economic Policy Research in London, Trustee of the Bianca Jagger Human Rights Foundation and Women for Women International.

From 2015 to 2020 Erik Berglöf served as the inaugural Director of the London School of Economics' (LSE) Institute of Global Affairs (IGA).

From 2006 to 2015 Erik Berglöf was the Chief Economist and special adviser to the president of the European Bank for Reconstruction and Development, the London-based multilateral development bank established in 1991 to lead the economic transformation of the former Communist states of Central and Eastern Europe, including the CIS nations.

== Asian Infrastructure Investment Bank (AIIB) ==
Erik Berglöf became the inaugural Chief Economist of the AIIB on 1 September 2020.

== London School of Economics (LSE) ==
Professor Erik Berglöf became the inaugural Director of the LSE's Institute of Global Affairs (IGA) on 1 February 2015.

As Director of IGA, Berglöf launched the LSE Global Policy Lab engaging advanced and emerging economies on research-based policy design and implementation.

== European Bank for Reconstruction and Development (EBRD) ==
As chief economist, Berglöf was on the bank's executive committee, Operations Committee, and Strategy and Policy Committee.

=== Vienna Initiative and T2T ===
Since joining the EBRD in 2006, Berglöf has been credited with creating the "Vienna Initiative", a crisis coordination response involving private banks, the IMF, the World Bank, the European Investment Bank and the European Commission, shown to have mitigated the impact of the 2008 financial crisis in Europe. Its sequel Vienna Initiative 2.0 focuses on managing the impact of the adjustment of the European banking system in the wake of the crisis. As part of the Vienna Initiative 2.0, Berglöf chaired a working group on the banking union with representatives from the international financial institutions, the European Commission, ECB, national regulators and supervisors, and a number of private banks.

Berglöf launched "Transition to Transition" (T2T), designed to promote peer-to-peer exchange of transition and reform experience between senior policymakers and sector experts in EBRD's current countries of operations and countries of the southern and eastern Mediterranean region. Together with Forward Thinking, a think tank promoting understanding between wider Muslim grassroots communities and European policymakers, he also initiated a series of multi-party meetings on private sector development with political leaders from Egypt, Libya and Tunisia.

=== European Union reform ===
Berglöf has also been involved in policymaking and broader reform efforts around the Euro-crisis as a member of the INET Council on the Eurozone Crisis. In addition, he is involved in global financial reform efforts as a member of the Global Agenda Council on Systemic Financial Risk and the steering group of The Role of Financial Services in Society, both under the World Economic Forum. He has contributed a number of publications on European Reform, including "BUILT TO LAST: A Political Architecture for Europe". In Sweden he has also served on a number of government commissions devoted to regulation and supervision of the financial sector, including the commission investigating the Swedish Financial Crisis and the Financial Markets Commission.

=== Corporate governance ===
Corporate governance has been a particular interest of Berglöf's. He has contributed to academic literature in the comparative study of corporate governance, as well as participated in various policy initiatives, including as a former co-director of the Global Corporate Governance Forum and current board member and research fellow of the European Corporate Governance Institute. In Sweden he was an expert on the government Commission of Ownership and Control (Ägarutredningen) and was invited to participate in the council created to assess the implementation of the Swedish corporate governance code.

=== Development and emerging markets ===
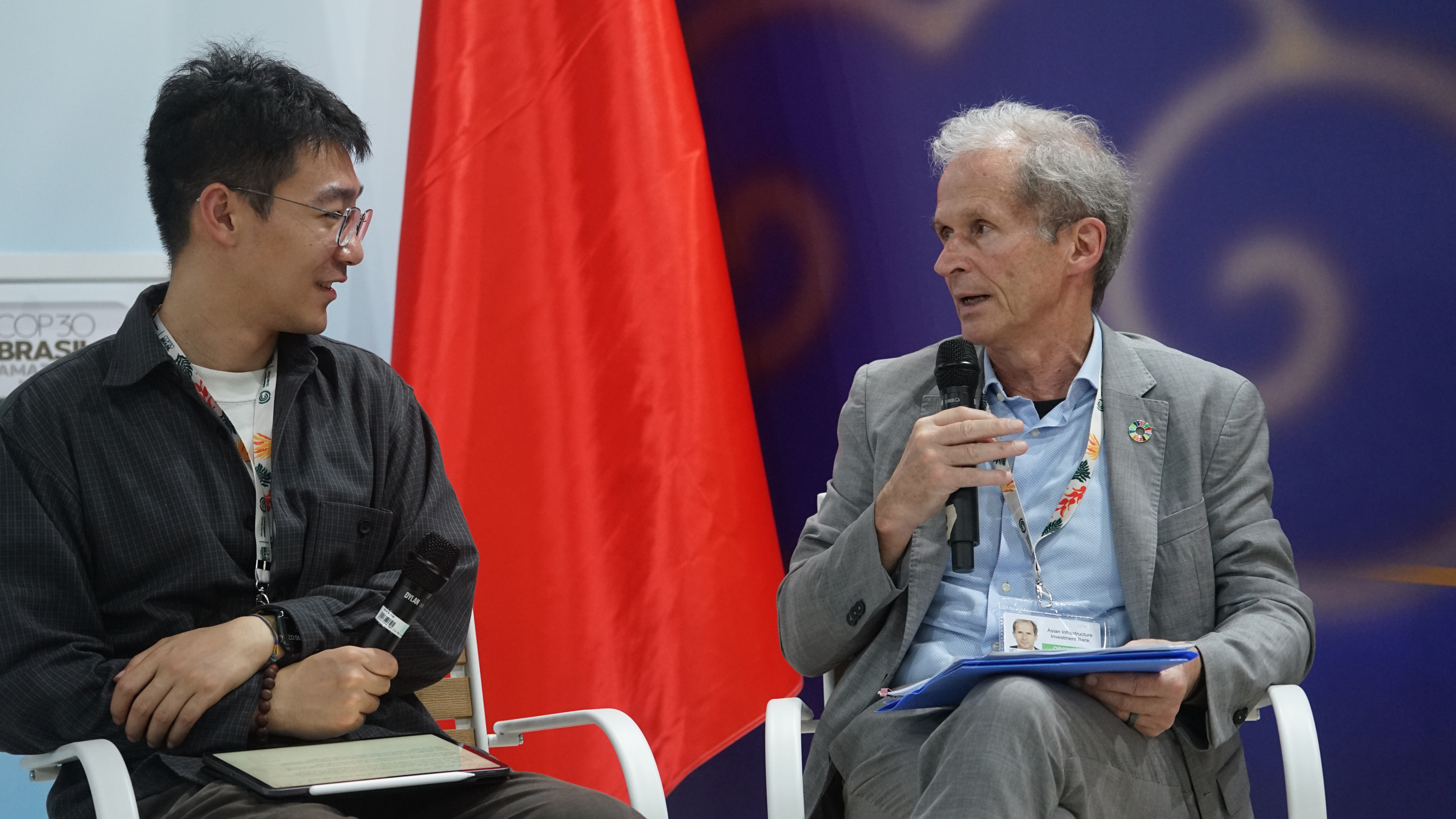
Berglöf at COP30, Belém, 2025

Berglöf is involved in broader development issues with a particular emphasis on emerging markets. He is a member of the Council of Chief Economists of the international financial institutions and has initiated collaboration with, among others, the MIT Poverty Lab and the Institute of Fiscal Studies on randomized field experiments and micro surveys, including initiating the Life in Transition Survey, a combined household and attitudinal survey implemented in 45 countries. He is a member of the governing board of the Institute for New Economic Thinking and has been a member of the Swedish Development Minister's Expert Group on Development Issues and the Swedish Foreign Minister's Strategic Advisory Board and EU Policy Advisory Board.

== Academic career ==
=== Stockholm School of Economics and SITE ===
Berglöf was a professor at the Stockholm School of Economics from 1996 to 2006. During his time at the Stockholm Institute of Transition Economics (SITE) he built it into a leading international research institution and helped establish several other think tanks in the emerging world: Baltic International Centre for Economic Policy Studies, Kyiv Economics Institute, WISER (now CenEA), and Center for China in the World Economy (CCWE), research-based think tanks in Riga, Kyiv, Warsaw (now Szczecin), and Beijing, respectively. In 2005, Berglöf co-founded with the Brookings Institution, The Global Institute, an alliance of research-based think tanks in emerging markets with the aim of strengthening evidence-based policymaking in emerging markets.

=== Russia ===
In 2000, Berglöf founded the Centre for Economic and Financial Research (CEFIR) in Moscow, recruiting the first PhDs in economics back to Russia to involve them in the policy process. By mid-2000s, CEFIR was ranked the best economics think tank in Russia and 25th in the world. Eventually, it has merged into the New Economic School, the leading graduate program in economics in Russia and the top economics department in the post-Communist world. Currently, Berglöf continue to be in the NES International Advisory Board and serves on NES board of directors. In 2013, Berglöf was awarded the Leontief Medal for his contributions to economic reform in Russia.

=== Other academic posts ===
Previous academic posts include visiting positions at Massachusetts Institute of Technology as a Fulbright Scholar, Harvard Law School (John M. Olin Scholar), and Stanford University where he was also a fellow of the Center for Advanced Studies in the Behavioral Sciences. From 1992 to 1996, he was an assistant professor at the Université Libre de Bruxelles where he was involved with the early building of European Center for Advanced Research in Economics and Statistics (Ecares), a research-based European think tank in economics.

He has been a member of the governing councils of the European Economic Association (EEA) and the Royal Economic Society. He is currently the treasurer of the International Economic Association (IEA).

=== Publications ===
Berglöf is published authority on financial contracting, corporate governance, economic transition, financial development and EU reform. He has published academic articles in, among others, American Economic Review, Quarterly Journal of Economics, Review of Financial Studies, Journal of Financial Economics and European Economic Review. His publications include: The Economics of Transition (Palgrave MacMillan), The New Political Economy of Russia (MIT Press) and Built to Last: A Political Architecture for Europe (CEPR).

== Early years ==
Erik Berglöf was born in Stockholm as the eldest of six children and grew up in Lund, Malmö and Östersund, Sweden. Early in his career, Berglöf held local political office: at 18 he was the youngest member elected to the city council of the Östersund Municipality and the County Council of Jämtland county. He did his military service at the Army Interpretation School where he studied Russian and East Bloc studies at Uppsala University and later was a special adviser on economic policy and physical planning in the Prime Minister's Office of Sweden. He has an MA and a PhD from the Stockholm School of Economics.

== Personal ==
Since 1989, Erik Berglöf has been married to Annie Maccoby Berglöf. Together they have two daughters, Alexandra and Katarina.
