= Porter Ridge High School =

American public secondary school in North Carolina

Location
- 2839 Ridge Road; Indian Trail, North Carolina 28079; United States; 35°05′24″N 80°34′12″W

Information
- School type: Public secondary school
- Established: 2005 (21 years ago)
- School district: Union County Public Schools
- CEEB code: 341924
- Principal: John DeLucia
- Staff: 90.22 (FTE)
- Grades: 9–12
- Enrollment: 1,766 (2023–2024)
- Student to teacher ratio: 19.57
- Colors: Purple, Black, and White
- Athletics: NCHSAA 7A
- Athletics conference: Southern Carolina 6A/7A
- Nickname: Pirates
- Website: prhs.ucpsnc.org

Porter Ridge High School is a public high school in Indian Trail, North Carolina. Opened in 2005, it is the largest high school in the Union County Public Schools School System. Located in the northwestern portion of Union County, it has experienced considerable growth in the last two decades. The school serves half of Indian Trail (shared with Sun Valley High School) and all of Hemby Bridge and Stallings. The school is next to the campuses of Porter Ridge Middle School and Porter Ridge Elementary School.

The school's mascot is a pirate, and the school colors are purple, black, and silver. The soccer, football, lacrosse, and track teams compete at Bonterra Stadium.

== Athletics ==
Porter Ridge is a member of the North Carolina High School Athletic Association (NCHSAA) and are currently classified as a 7A school. The school is a part of the Southern Carolina 6A/7A Conference. Porter Ridge's team name are the Pirates, with their school colors being purple, black and white. Listed below are the different sports that Porter Ridge offers for its students:

- Baseball
- Basketball
- Competition Cheerleading
- Cross Country
- Football
- Golf
- Lacrosse
- Soccer
- Softball
- Swimming
- Tennis
- Indoor/Outdoor Track & Field
- Volleyball
- Wrestling

In 2012, the softball team won the school's first team state championship, winning the NCHSAA 4A State Championship (North Carolina's former highest classification for high school athletics) over Holly Springs High School. They finished the season as the number one overall softball team in North Carolina and number two nationally, according to the final 2012 FloSoftball FAB 50 high school rankings.

== The Band of Pirates ==
The Porter Ridge Band of Pirates, the school's marching band, has an accomplished history. Beyond attaining competition accolades, the band has been invited to perform at events across the country; most notably on the USS Missouri during the 2015 commemoration of the Attack on Pearl Harbor in Honolulu, HI.

== Location ==
Porter Ridge Elementary, Middle, and High were all built on land donated by the Porter family. This, in conjunction with the campus' proximity to Ridge Road, gave the school its name.

The school's campus is on the South Fork of Crooked Creek, and is situated across from an environmentally protected area that is home to a rare mollusk, the Carolina heelsplitter. Weddington High School was the prototype for the school's design.

== Controversy ==
In 2021, former science teacher Alexander Dewsbury was criminally charged with, among other counts, indecent liberties with a student.

== Notable alumni ==
- Lexi Davis, college softball coach and former softball pitcher at Auburn
- Caleb Homesley, professional basketball player
- Grayson McCall, college football coach and former quarterback at Coastal Carolina
- Kenzie Petty, winner of Survivor 46
