= Lexy =

Lexy may refer to:

== Places ==
- Lexy, Meurthe-et-Moselle, a commune of the Meurthe-et-Moselle department in France

== People with the surname ==
- Edward Lexy (1897–1970), British film actor

== People with the given name or stage name ==
- Lexy (singer), Korean female soloist
- Lexy (Alexander Gerlach), one half of Lexy & K-Paul, DJs from Berlin
- Lexy Kolker (born 2009), American actress
- Lexy Nair (born 1996), American sports broadcaster
- Lexy Ortega (born 1969), Italian chess Grandmaster
- Lexy Ramler (born 1999), American artistic gymnast
- Lexy Schenk, American beauty pageant titleholder (Miss South Dakota USA) in 2015

== See also ==
- Lexi, a given name (typically for a girl)
