= RSC Brands =

- Type: Private
- Industry: Automotive; Rubber; Chemicals
- Founded: 1924
- Founder: I.D. Blumenthal
- Headquarters: Charlotte, NC, U.S.
- Area served: North America
- Key people: Mike Guggenheimer (President and CEO); Alan Blumenthal (Chairman)
- Revenue: US$ 98.4 million
- Operating income: US$ 56.457 million
- Net income: US$ 43.834 million
- Total assets: US$ 178.998 million
- Total equity: US$ 56.575 million
- Number of employees: 210
- Website: rscbrands.com

RSC Chemical Solutions is a privately held automotive products company based in Charlotte, North Carolina, with a manufacturing headquarters in Indian Trail, North Carolina. It is one of the nation's top automotive products producers and the second-largest producer of ancillary radiator products in the United States and Canada.

The firm is currently based in a 400,000-square-foot (37,000 m^{2}) facility in Indian Trail. It has a total employment of approximately 250 people. Its current President and CEO is Mike Guggenheimer.

The company was founded as Radiator Specialty Company in 1924 by I.D. Blumenthal, who began marketing a product called Solder Seal to fix leaky car radiators. He was joined by his younger brother Herman Blumenthal in 1933.

RSC's makes Gunk, a line of degreasers, Gunk, which has been described as an "instrument shampoo," was developed by Gunk Chicago Co. Originally, RSC was a regional distributor for Gunk.

RSC also produces Liquid Wrench, a line of lubricants marketed as "application-specific" competitors to WD-40. The company adopted the name RSC Chemical Solutions in 2010.

The Blumenthal family have been responsible for significant philanthropic efforts in North Carolina, including substantial funding for the North Carolina Blumenthal Performing Arts Center in Charlotte.

In 2022, Blumenthal Holdings LLC decided to sell all assets of Blumenthal Brands Integrated to B'later Holdings. B'later Holdings will now acquire all products under GUNK, Liquid Wrench, and Titeseal brands.
