= Lexi Davis =

American softball coach

Current position
- Title: Assistant coach
- Team: Furman
- Conference: SoCon

Biographical details
- Born: October 22, 1994 (age 31); Charlotte, North Carolina, U.S.

Playing career
- 2013–2016: Auburn
- Position: Pitcher

Coaching career (HC unless noted)
- 2018–present: Furman (asst.)

Accomplishments and honors

Championships
- Women's College World Series runner-up (2016)

Alexis McKenzie Davis (born October 22, 1994) is an American softball coach and former player who is currently an assistant coach at Furman.

== Career ==
Davis attended Porter Ridge High School in Indian Trail, North Carolina, where she was named ESPN High School National Softball Player of the Year in 2012. She later attended Auburn University, where she played pitcher. She holds Auburn's school softball record for most wins by a pitcher. During her senior season, Davis led the Tigers to the 2016 Women's College World Series final, where they fell to Oklahoma, 2–1.

== Coaching career ==
In 2018, Davis was named an assistant coach at Furman.
