= 2024–25 EuroCup Basketball =

European basketball competition

2024–25 BKT EuroCup^{1}
- Season: 2024–25
- Dates: 24 September 2024 – 16 April 2025
- Games played: 180 + Playoffs
- Teams: 20

Regular season
- Season MVP: (United States) Jared Harper (Hapoel Jerusalem)

Finals
- Champions: (Israeli Basketball Association) Hapoel Shlomo Tel Aviv (1st title)
- Runners-up: (Spanish Basketball Federation) Dreamland Gran Canaria
- Semi-finalists: (Turkish Basketball Federation) Bahçeşehir Koleji (Spain) Valencia Basket
- Finals MVP: (USA Basketball) Johnathan Motley (Hapoel Tel Aviv)

Awards
- Coach of the Year: (Spain) Pedro Martínez
- Rising Star: (Dominican Republic) Jean Montero

Statistical leaders
Points	Jared Harper	22.8
Rebounds	Mfiondu Kabengele	9.7
Assists	Zavier Simpson	8.0
Index Rating	Jared Harper	27.2

Records
- Biggest home win: Gran Canaria 125–78 Ulm (22 October 2024)
- Biggest away win: Aris 51–92 JL Bourg (15 January 2025)
- Highest scoring: Budućnost 120–111 Trento (18 December 2024)
- Lowest scoring: Aris 59–63 Valencia (6 November 2024)
- ^{1} Sponsored name, referring to BKT.

The 2024–25 EuroCup Basketball season was the 23rd season of Euroleague Basketball's secondary level professional club basketball tournament. It was the 17th season since it was renamed from the ULEB Cup to the EuroCup, and the second season under the new title sponsorship name of BKT. The season began on 24 September 2024 and ended on 16 April 2025 with the Finals.

== Team allocation ==
A total of 20 teams from 12 countries participated in the 2024–25 EuroCup season. On June 17, 2024, Euroleague Basketball confirmed the team list for the season.

=== Teams ===
League positions after the playoffs of the previous season are shown in parentheses.

Qualified teams for 2024–25 EuroCup Basketball (by entry round)
Regular season
(Spanish Basketball Federation) Valencia Basket (5th)	(Israeli Basketball Association) Hapoel Shlomo Tel Aviv (2nd)
(Spanish Basketball Federation) Dreamland Gran Canaria (7th)	(Israeli Basketball Association) Hapoel Bank Yahav Jerusalem (3rd)
(Spanish Basketball Federation) Joventut Badalona (10th)	(Italian Basketball Federation) Umana Reyer Venezia (4th)
(Turkish Basketball Federation) Beşiktaş Fibabanka (3rd)	(Italian Basketball Federation) Dolomiti Energia Trento (7th)
(Turkish Basketball Federation) Türk Telekom (8th)	(Lithuanian Basketball Federation) 7bet-Lietkabelis (3rd)
(Turkish Basketball Federation) Bahçeşehir Koleji (13th)	(Lithuanian Basketball Federation) Wolves Twinsbet (4th)
(Basketball Federation of Montenegro) Budućnost VOLI (3rd)	(French Federation of Basketball) Cosea JL Bourg (4th)
(Basketball Federation of Slovenia) Cedevita Olimpija (5th)	(Hellenic Basketball Federation) Aris Midea (4th)
(German Basketball Federation) ratiopharm Ulm (5th)	(Polish Basketball Federation) Trefl Sopot (1st)
(German Basketball Federation) Veolia Towers Hamburg (9th)	(Romanian Basketball Federation) U-BT Cluj-Napoca (1st)

Notes

1. ABA League (ABA): Budućnost VOLI and Cedevita Olimpija qualified through the ABA League.

== Round and draw dates ==
The schedule of the competition is as follows.

Schedule for 2024–25 EuroCup Basketball
Phase	Round	Draw date	First leg	Second leg	Third leg
Regular season	Round 1	5 July 2024	24–25 September 2024		
Regular season	Round 2	5 July 2024	1–2 October 2024		
Regular season	Round 3	5 July 2024	8–9 October 2024		
Regular season	Round 4	5 July 2024	15–16 October 2024		
Regular season	Round 5	5 July 2024	22–23 October 2024		
Regular season	Round 6	5 July 2024	29–30 October 2024		
Regular season	Round 7	5 July 2024	5–6 November 2024		
Regular season	Round 8	5 July 2024	12–13 November 2024		
Regular season	Round 9	5 July 2024	28–29 November 2024		
Regular season	Round 10	5 July 2024	3–4 December 2024		
Regular season	Round 11	5 July 2024	10–11 December 2024		
Regular season	Round 12	5 July 2024	17–18 December 2024		
Regular season	Round 13	5 July 2024	2–3 January 2025		
Regular season	Round 14	5 July 2024	7–8 January 2025		
Regular season	Round 15	5 July 2024	14–15 January 2025		
Regular season	Round 16	5 July 2024	21–22 January 2025		
Regular season	Round 17	5 July 2024	28–29 January 2025		
Regular season	Round 18	5 July 2024	4–5 February 2025		
Playoffs	Eighthfinals	5 July 2024	4–5 March 2025		
Playoffs	Quarterfinals	5 July 2024	11–12 March 2025		
Playoffs	Semifinals	5 July 2024	25 March 2025	28 March 2025	2 April 2025
Playoffs	Finals	5 July 2024	8 April 2025	11 April 2025	16 April 2025

=== Draw ===
The draw was held on 5 July 2024 in Barcelona, Spain.

The 20 teams were drawn into two groups of 10, with the restriction that teams from the same league could not be drawn against each other, except when there were more than two teams from the same league participating in the regular season. For the draw, the teams were seeded into 10 pots, in accordance with the Club Ranking, based on their performance in European competitions during a three-year period and the lowest possible position that any club from that league can occupy in the draw is calculated by adding the results of the worst performing team from each league.

Pot 1 Team (Spanish Basketball Federation) Valencia Basket (Israeli Basketball Association) Hapoel Shlomo Tel Aviv	Pot 2 Team (Israeli Basketball Association) Hapoel Bank Yahav Jerusalem (Spanish Basketball Federation) Dreamland Gran Canaria
Pot 3 Team (Spanish Basketball Federation) Joventut Badalona (French Federation of Basketball) Cosea JL Bourg	Pot 4 Team (Turkish Basketball Federation) Türk Telekom (German Basketball Federation) ratiopharm Ulm
Pot 5 Team (Basketball Federation of Montenegro) Budućnost VOLI (Italian Basketball Federation) Umana Reyer Venezia	Pot 6 Team (Hellenic Basketball Federation) Aris Midea (Turkish Basketball Federation) Beşiktaş Fibabanka
Pot 7 Team (Turkish Basketball Federation) Bahçeşehir Koleji (Lithuanian Basketball Federation) 7bet-Lietkabelis	Pot 8 Team (Lithuanian Basketball Federation) Wolves Twinsbet (Basketball Federation of Slovenia) Cedevita Olimpija
Pot 9 Team (German Basketball Federation) Veolia Towers Hamburg (Italian Basketball Federation) Dolomiti Energia Trento	Pot 10 Team (Polish Basketball Federation) Trefl Sopot (Romanian Basketball Federation) U-BT Cluj-Napoca

The fixtures were decided after the draw, using a computer draw not shown to public, with the following match sequence:

Note: Positions for scheduling do not use the seeding pots, e.g., Team 1 is not necessarily the team from Pot 1 in the draw.

Round	Matches
Round 1	10 v 5, 6 v 4, 7 v 3, 8 v 2, 9 v 1
Round 2	1 v 10, 2 v 9, 3 v 8, 4 v 7, 5 v 6
Round 3	10 v 6, 7 v 5, 8 v 4, 9 v 3, 1 v 2
Round 4	2 v 10, 3 v 1, 4 v 9, 5 v 8, 6 v 7
Round 5	10 v 7, 8 v 6, 9 v 5, 1 v 4, 2 v 3
Round 6	3 v 10, 4 v 2, 5 v 1, 6 v 9, 7 v 8
Round 7	10 v 8, 9 v 7, 1 v 6, 2 v 5, 3 v 4
Round 8	10 v 4, 5 v 3, 6 v 2, 7 v 1, 8 v 9
Round 9	9 v 10, 1 v 8, 2 v 7, 3 v 6, 4 v 5

Round	Matches
Round 10	5 v 10, 4 v 6, 3 v 7, 2 v 8, 1 v 9
Round 11	10 v 1, 9 v 2, 8 v 3, 7 v 4, 6 v 5
Round 12	6 v 10, 5 v 7, 4 v 8, 3 v 9, 2 v 1
Round 13	10 v 2, 1 v 3, 9 v 4, 8 v 5, 7 v 6
Round 14	7 v 10, 6 v 8, 5 v 9, 4 v 1, 3 v 2
Round 15	10 v 3, 2 v 4, 1 v 5, 9 v 6, 8 v 7
Round 16	8 v 10, 7 v 9, 6 v 1, 5 v 2, 4 v 3
Round 17	4 v 10, 3 v 5, 2 v 6, 1 v 7, 9 v 8
Round 18	10 v 9, 8 v 1, 7 v 2, 6 v 3, 5 v 4

There were scheduling restrictions: for example, teams from the same city in general were not scheduled to play at home on the same round (to avoid them playing at home on the same day or on consecutive days, due to logistics and crowd control). This restriction was applied to the two teams from Israel (Hapoel Bank Yahav Jerusalem and Hapoel Shlomo Tel Aviv) that play their home games at Arena Samokov in Samokov, Bulgaria due to the Gaza war.

== Regular season ==
Location of teams of the 2024–25 EuroCup regular season.
Red: Group A; Green: Group B.

The regular season began on 24 September 2024 and concluded on 5 February 2025. In each group, teams play against each other home-and-away in a round-robin format where only six teams advanced to the playoffs. Moreover, the top two teams in each regular season group received first round playoff byes, skipping the eighthfinals to be placed directly into the quarterfinals. At the tail end of the standings, four teams from each group were eliminated after the regular season.

Alongside 16 returning teams from last season, four-time former champion Valencia Basket returned to the EuroCup three years later, former champion Hapoel Bank Yahav Jerusalem returned seven years later, Bahçeşehir Koleji returned four years later, and Polish champion Trefl Sopot returned 12 years later.

=== Group A ===
==== Standings ====
Pos	Team	Pld	W	L	PF	PA	PD	Qualification
1	(Turkish Basketball Federation) Bahçeşehir Koleji	18	14	4	1463	1334	+129	Advance to quarterfinals
2	(Israeli Basketball Association) Hapoel Shlomo Tel Aviv	18	12	6	1583	1424	+159	Advance to quarterfinals
3	(Spanish Basketball Federation) Dreamland Gran Canaria	18	12	6	1409	1351	+58	Advance to eighthfinals
4	(Lithuanian Basketball Federation) Wolves Twinsbet	18	10	8	1501	1523	−22	Advance to eighthfinals
5	(Turkish Basketball Federation) Beşiktaş Fibabanka	18	10	8	1526	1504	+22	Advance to eighthfinals
6	(Basketball Federation of Montenegro) Budućnost VOLI	18	9	9	1520	1498	+22	Advance to eighthfinals
7	(German Basketball Federation) ratiopharm Ulm	18	9	9	1543	1563	−20	
8	(Spanish Basketball Federation) Joventut Badalona	18	7	11	1422	1505	−83	
9	(Italian Basketball Federation) Dolomiti Energia Trento	18	6	12	1413	1510	−97	
10	(Polish Basketball Federation) Trefl Sopot	18	1	17	1354	1522	−168	

Source: EuroCup
Rules for classification: All points scored in extra period(s) are not counted in the standings, nor for any tie-break situation.

==== Results ====
Home \ Away	BKS	BJK	BUD	TRE	DGC	HTA	CJB	ULM	SOP	WLV
Bahçeşehir Koleji (Turkish Basketball Federation)	—	87–66	95–93	110–70	73–65	90–82	89–78	85–81	79–67	84–74
Beşiktaş Fibabanka (Turkish Basketball Federation)	89–82	—	94–76	79–75	74–76	87–101	82–76	107–74	87–72	79–77
Budućnost VOLI (Basketball Federation of Montenegro)	75–92	88–90	—	110–108	86–89	84–83	107–75	105–100	92–83	104–77
Dolomiti Energia Trento (Italian Basketball Federation)	69–73	68–83	64–85	—	70–81	79–73	87–85	86–71	84–78	70–96
Dreamland Gran Canaria (Spanish Basketball Federation)	66–63	90–81	82–71	84–81	—	64–87	77–83	125–78	84–58	66–68
Hapoel Shlomo Tel Aviv (Israeli Basketball Association)	84–77	109–101	92–72	89–68	79–66	—	95–70	80–82	91–72	89–84
Joventut Badalona (Spanish Basketball Federation)	69–56	93–70	78–72	86–100	76–78	78–75	—	88–102	92–89	63–86
ratiopharm Ulm (German Basketball Federation)	72–80	104–87	82–85	84–82	76–83	90–97	87–83	—	83–69	114–91
Trefl Sopot (Polish Basketball Federation)	76–81	79–100	69–81	70–82	73–76	64–93	73–78	93–96	—	92–99
Wolves Twinsbet (Lithuanian Basketball Federation)	69–80	93–78	91–82	88–83	88–76	104–100	91–80	76–94	74–97	—

Source: EuroCup
Legend: Blue = home team win; Red = away team win.
Matches with lighter background shading were decided after overtime.

=== Group B ===
==== Standings ====
Pos	Team	Pld	W	L	PF	PA	PD	Qualification
1	(Spanish Basketball Federation) Valencia Basket	18	16	2	1726	1460	+266	Advance to quarterfinals
2	(Israeli Basketball Association) Hapoel Bank Yahav Jerusalem	18	11	7	1512	1398	+114	Advance to quarterfinals
3	(Turkish Basketball Federation) Türk Telekom	18	10	8	1437	1470	−33	Advance to eighthfinals
4	(Basketball Federation of Slovenia) Cedevita Olimpija	18	10	8	1476	1471	+5	Advance to eighthfinals
5	(Romanian Basketball Federation) U-BT Cluj-Napoca	18	10	8	1602	1566	+36	Advance to eighthfinals
6	(Italian Basketball Federation) Umana Reyer Venezia	18	10	8	1465	1484	−19	Advance to eighthfinals
7	(French Federation of Basketball) Cosea JL Bourg	18	9	9	1560	1497	+63	
8	(German Basketball Federation) Veolia Towers Hamburg	18	6	12	1400	1562	−162	
9	(Lithuanian Basketball Federation) 7bet-Lietkabelis	18	5	13	1470	1560	−90	
10	(Hellenic Basketball Federation) Aris Midea	18	3	15	1341	1521	−180	

Source: EuroCup
Rules for classification: All points scored in extra period(s) are not counted in the standings, nor for any tie-break situation.

==== Results ====
Home \ Away	LIE	ARI	COL	JLB	JLM	TTA	UBT	URV	HAM	VBC
7bet-Lietkabelis (Lithuanian Basketball Federation)	—	74–92	78–88	84–80	74–94	93–98	92–91	93–100	91–68	91–96
Aris Midea (Hellenic Basketball Federation)	81–66	—	75–82	51–92	68–78	63–68	74–89	74–81	88–90	59–63
Cedevita Olimpija (Basketball Federation of Slovenia)	76–72	98–79	—	83–90	83–94	74–80	103–96	87–82	95–68	66–72
Cosea JL Bourg (French Federation of Basketball)	79–66	88–91	87–82	—	67–94	67–63	84–73	99–102	93–82	96–107
Hapoel Bank Yahav Jerusalem (Israeli Basketball Association)	87–93	90–85	70–74	86–77	—	76–66	73–81	94–66	89–74	64–80
Türk Telekom (Turkish Basketball Federation)	72–66	87–77	78–70	98–89	77–94	—	99–80	84–81	77–65	87–101
U-BT Cluj-Napoca (Romanian Basketball Federation)	100–93	87–79	86–93	89–86	79–91	94–81	—	86–78	104–83	96–105
Umana Reyer Venezia (Italian Basketball Federation)	91–77	95–75	75–80	66–88	76–75	75–67	77–88	—	80–68	81–74
Veolia Towers Hamburg (German Basketball Federation)	84–77	93–69	80–62	80–100	82–80	89–77	67–103	77–90	—	78–86
Valencia Basket (Spanish Basketball Federation)	106–107	106–65	109–80	100–98	96–83	116–78	108–80	105–83	105–78	—

Source: EuroCup
Legend: Blue = home team win; Red = away team win.
Matches with lighter background shading were decided after overtime.

== Playoffs ==
In the playoffs, teams played against each other in a knockout tournament into four rounds from eighthfinals to finals. At the end of the regular season, the six teams from each group with the most wins qualified for the playoffs. The two top teams from each regular season group receive a bye and qualify directly to the quarterfinals. The remaining eight qualified teams will enter the eighthfinals to compete in a single-game format in which the third-placed teams of each group will face off against the sixth-placed teams of the opposite groups and the fourth-placed teams of each group will face off against the fifth-placed teams of the opposite groups. The four winning teams from eighthfinals will enter the quarterfinals to face off in a single-game format in the home of the two top teams from each regular season group. The higher-placed regular season team in each matchup will enjoy home court advantage in eighthfinals and quarterfinals. From semifinals onwards, teams will play in best-of-three series with the first leg and third leg, if necessary, in the home court of the higher-placed regular season team to crown the EuroCup champion.

=== Bracket ===
Eighthfinals
(Basketball Federation of Slovenia) Cedevita Olimpija	96
(Turkish Basketball Federation) Beşiktaş Fibabanka	86
(Spanish Basketball Federation) Dreamland Gran Canaria	84
(Italian Basketball Federation) Umana Reyer Venezia	80
(Lithuanian Basketball Federation) Wolves Twinsbet	99
(Romanian Basketball Federation) U-BT Cluj-Napoca	100
(Turkish Basketball Federation) Türk Telekom	93
(Basketball Federation of Montenegro) Budućnost VOLI	73

Quarterfinals
(Turkish Basketball Federation) Bahçeşehir Koleji	85
(Basketball Federation of Slovenia) Cedevita Olimpija	81
(Israeli Basketball Association) Hapoel Bank Yahav Jerusalem	89
(Spanish Basketball Federation) Dreamland Gran Canaria	92
(Spanish Basketball Federation) Valencia Basket	98
(Romanian Basketball Federation) U-BT Cluj-Napoca	74
(Israeli Basketball Association) Hapoel Shlomo Tel Aviv	67
(Turkish Basketball Federation) Türk Telekom	61

Semifinals
(Turkish Basketball Federation) Bahçeşehir Koleji	74	68	72	1
(Spanish Basketball Federation) Dreamland Gran Canaria	66	69	76	2
(Spanish Basketball Federation) Valencia Basket	91	91	92	1
(Israeli Basketball Association) Hapoel Shlomo Tel Aviv	82	96	94	2

Finals
(Spanish Basketball Federation) Dreamland Gran Canaria	65	94	–	0
(Israeli Basketball Association) Hapoel Shlomo Tel Aviv	74	103	–	2

=== Eighthfinals ===
The eighthfinals was played on 4–5 March 2025.

Home team	Score	Away team
Dreamland Gran Canaria (Spanish Basketball Federation)	84–80	(Italian Basketball Federation) Umana Reyer Venezia
Cedevita Olimpija (Basketball Federation of Slovenia)	96–86	(Turkish Basketball Federation) Beşiktaş Fibabanka
Türk Telekom (Turkish Basketball Federation)	93–73	(Basketball Federation of Montenegro) Budućnost VOLI
Wolves Twinsbet (Lithuanian Basketball Federation)	99–100	(Romanian Basketball Federation) U-BT Cluj-Napoca

=== Quarterfinals ===
The quarterfinals was played on 11–12 March 2025.

Home team	Score	Away team
Bahçeşehir Koleji (Turkish Basketball Federation)	85–81	(Basketball Federation of Slovenia) Cedevita Olimpija
Hapoel Bank Yahav Jerusalem (Israeli Basketball Association)	89–92	(Spanish Basketball Federation) Dreamland Gran Canaria
Valencia Basket (Spanish Basketball Federation)	98–74	(Romanian Basketball Federation) U-BT Cluj-Napoca
Hapoel Shlomo Tel Aviv (Israeli Basketball Association)	67–61	(Turkish Basketball Federation) Türk Telekom

=== Semifinals ===
The first legs was played on 25 March, the second legs on 28 March and the third legs on 2 April 2025.

Team 1	Series	Team 2	1st leg	2nd leg	3rd leg
Bahçeşehir Koleji (Turkish Basketball Federation)	1–2	(Spanish Basketball Federation) Dreamland Gran Canaria	74–66	68–69	72–76
Valencia Basket (Spanish Basketball Federation)	1–2	(Israeli Basketball Association) Hapoel Shlomo Tel Aviv	91–82	91–96	92–94

=== Finals ===
The first legs will be played on 8 April, the second legs on 11 April and the third legs on 16 April 2025, if necessary.

Team 1	Series	Team 2	1st leg	2nd leg	3rd leg
Hapoel Shlomo Tel Aviv (Israeli Basketball Association)	2–0	(Spanish Basketball Federation) Dreamland Gran Canaria	74–65	103–94	—

== Awards ==
=== EuroCup MVP ===
Player	Team	Ref.
(United States) Jared Harper	(Israeli Basketball Association) Hapoel Jerusalem	

=== EuroCup Final MVP ===
Player	Team	Ref.
(United States) Johnathan Motley	(Israeli Basketball Association) Hapoel Tel Aviv	

=== BKT All–EuroCup Teams ===
BKT All–EuroCup First Team		BKT All–EuroCup Second Team		Ref
Player	Team	Player	Team	Ref
(United States) Jared Harper	(Israel) Hapoel Jerusalem	(United States) Zavier Simpson	(Romania) U-BT Cluj-Napoca	
(Dominican Republic) Jean Montero	(Spain) Valencia	(United States) Anthony Brown	(Turkey) Türk Telekom	
(Croatia) Jaleen Smith	(Turkey) Bahçeşehir Koleji	(Spain) Xabier López-Arostegui	(Spain) Valencia	
(United States) Johnathan Motley	(Israel) Hapoel Tel Aviv	(United States) Semi Ojeleye	(Spain) Valencia	
(Canada) Mfiondu Kabengele	(Italy) Reyer Venezia	(United States) Devin Robinson	(Slovenia) Cedevita Olimpija	

=== Coach of the Year ===
Coach	Team	Ref.
(Spain) Pedro Martínez	(Spain) Valencia Basket	

=== Rising Star ===
Player	Team	Ref.
(Dominican Republic) Jean Montero	(Spanish Basketball Federation) Valencia Basket	

=== MVP of the round ===
==== Regular season ====
Round	Player	Team	PIR	Ref.
1	(Croatia) Ante Tomić	(Spanish Basketball Federation) Joventut Badalona	32	
2	(United States) Jared Harper	(Israeli Basketball Association) Hapoel Jerusalem	27	
3	(United States) Johnathan Motley	(Israeli Basketball Association) Hapoel Tel Aviv	34	
4	(United States) Anthony Cowan Jr.	(Lithuanian Basketball Federation) Wolves Twinsbet	33	
5	(France) Axel Bouteille	(Turkish Basketball Federation) Bahçeşehir Koleji	34	
5	(Serbia) Marko Pecarski	(Lithuania) 7bet-Lietkabelis Panevėžys	34	
6	(United States) Jared Harper (x2)	(Israeli Basketball Association) Hapoel Jerusalem	43	
7	(United States) Anthony Brown	(Turkish Basketball Federation) Türk Telekom	45	
8	(United States) Zavier Simpson	(Romanian Basketball Federation) U-BT Cluj-Napoca	34	
9	(United States) Jared Harper (x3)	(Israeli Basketball Association) Hapoel Jerusalem	38	
10	(Colombia) Braian Angola	(Turkish Basketball Federation) Türk Telekom	34	
11	(United States) Anthony Cowan Jr. (x2)	(Lithuanian Basketball Federation) Wolves Twinsbet	33	
12	(Bosnia and Herzegovina) Kenan Kamenjaš	(Basketball Federation of Montenegro) Budućnost VOLI	34	
13	(United States) Jared Harper (x4)	(Israeli Basketball Association) Hapoel Jerusalem	38	
14	(Croatia) Jaleen Smith	(Turkish Basketball Federation) Bahçeşehir Koleji	32	
15	(Croatia) Jaleen Smith (2)	(Turkish Basketball Federation) Bahçeşehir Koleji	39	
16	(United States) D. J. Seeley	(Romanian Basketball Federation) U-BT Cluj-Napoca	33	
17	(United States) Jared Harper (x5)	(Israeli Basketball Association) Hapoel Jerusalem	38	
18	(Canada) Tyler Ennis	(Italian Basketball Federation) Umana Reyer Venezia	33	

==== Playoffs ====
Round	Player	Team	PIR	Ref.
Eighthfinals	(United States) Devin Robinson	(Basketball Federation of Slovenia) Cedevita Olimpija	30	
Quarterfinals	(Montenegro) Marko Simonović	(Turkish Basketball Federation) Bahçeşehir Koleji	27	
Semifinals	(Israel) Yam Madar	(Israeli Basketball Association) Hapoel Tel Aviv	20.7	

== See also ==
- 2024–25 EuroLeague
- 2024–25 Basketball Champions League
- 2024–25 FIBA Europe Cup
