= Caleb Homesley =

American basketball player

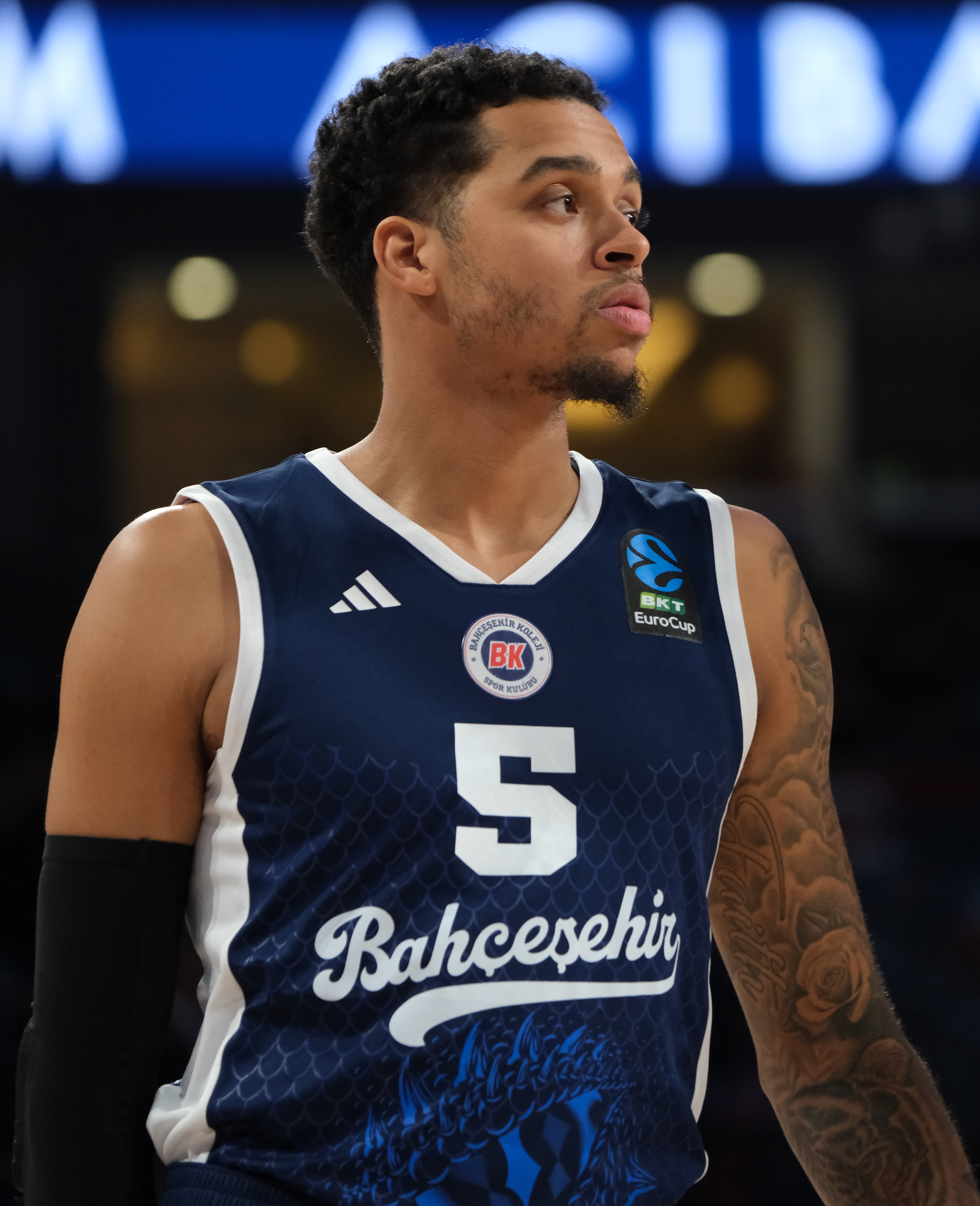
- Homesley with Bahçeşehir Koleji in 2025

No. 5 – Basket Zaragoza
- Position: Shooting guard
- League: Liga ACB

Personal information
- Born: November 27, 1996 (age 29)
- Listed height: 6 ft 6 in (1.98 m)
- Listed weight: 205 lb (93 kg)

Career information
- High school: Porter Ridge (Indian Trail, North Carolina)
- College: Liberty (2015–2020)
- NBA draft: 2020: undrafted
- Playing career: 2021–present

Career history
- 2021: Erie BayHawks
- 2021–2022: Hamburg Towers
- 2022–2023: Zenit Saint Petersburg
- 2023–2024: Tofaş
- 2024–2025: Gran Canaria
- 2025–2026: Bahçeşehir Koleji
- 2026–present: Zaragoza

Career highlights
- All-EuroCup Second Team (2022); Atlantic Sun Player of the Year (2020); 2× First-team All-Atlantic Sun (2019, 2020); Atlantic Sun tournament MVP (2020)
- Stats at NBA.com
- Stats at Basketball Reference

Caleb Allen Homesley (born November 27, 1996) is an American basketball player for Zaragoza of the Spanish Liga ACB. He played college basketball for the Liberty Flames.

== Early life ==
Homesley attended Porter Ridge High School in Indian Trail, North Carolina. He averaged 20 points, 5 rebounds, and 3 assists per game as a junior. On November 14, 2014, Homesley committed to Liberty, spurning offers from The Citadel, Appalachian State, Abilene Christian, Gardner-Webb, High Point, Kent State, and UNC Greensboro. In his senior season, he tore his anterior cruciate ligament.

== College career ==
Shortly after Homesley arrived at Liberty University, coach Ritchie McKay suggested he transfer to a Division II school. This served to motivate Homesley, who began working harder and getting in shape. In his freshman season, he played 32 games, averaging 7.2 points and 3.4 rebounds per game. Homesley tore the ligament in his right knee during a game against Princeton on December 10, 2016, ending his season. He was averaging 12.9 points, 6.3 rebounds, and 2.9 assists per games. Homesley took a medical redshirt, preserving a season of eligibility. In his redshirt sophomore season, Homesley averaged 7.8 points, 4.5 rebounds, and 1.9 assists per game. As a junior, Homesley was named to the First Team All-ASUN Conference. During the 2019 NCAA Division I men's basketball tournament, Homesley scored a career-high 30 points on 10-for-16 shooting in an 80–76 upset of Mississippi State. He averaged 12.9 points, 5.6 rebounds, and 2.7 assists per game as a junior on a team that finished 29–7. Coming into his senior season, Homesley was included on the preseason watch list for the Lou Henson Award, presented annually to the nation's top mid-major player. On February 8, 2020, Homesley tied a career-high 30 points and had nine rebounds in a 74–56 win over North Alabama. At the conclusion of the regular season, Homesley was named the Atlantic Sun Player of the Year. Homesly averaged 15.3 points and 5.7 rebounds per game as a senior.

== Professional career ==
After going undrafted in the 2020 NBA draft, Homesley signed an Exhibit 10 contract with the Washington Wizards. He was waived at the end of training camp.

On January 9, 2021, he signed with the Erie BayHawks as a flex player after Washington's affiliate, the Capital City Go-Go, declined to play the NBA G League restart. in 15 games, he averaged 9.3 points, 4.1 rebounds and 2.3 assists.

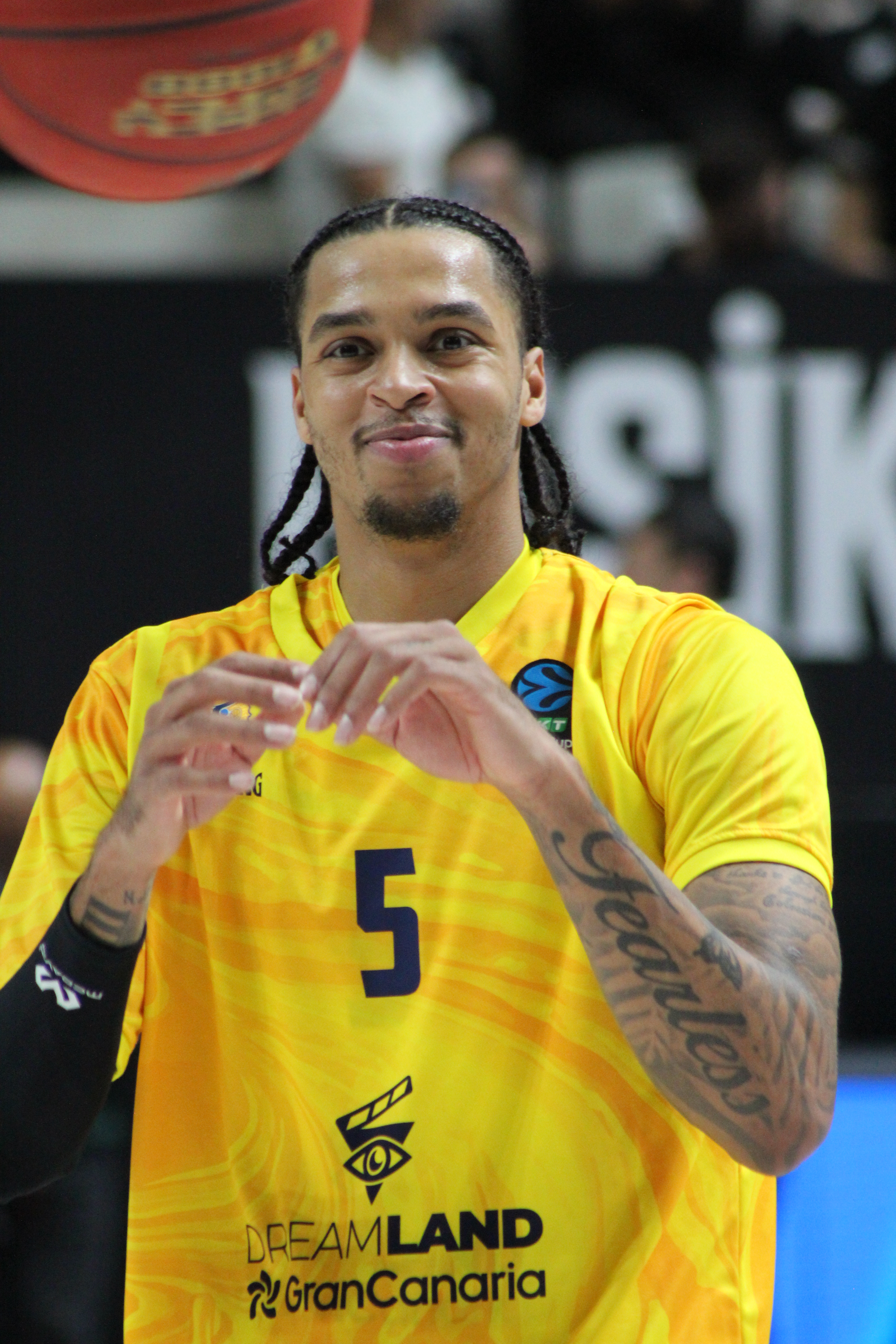
Homesley with Gran Canaria in 2024

On May 15, 2021, Homesley signed a multi-year contract with the Wizards. However, he was waived on August 5, without appearing in a game.

On September 1, he signed with the Hamburg Towers of the Basketball Bundesliga in Germany.

On July 6, 2022, he signed with the Utah Jazz of the National Basketball Association for NBA Summer League.

On July 15, 2022, he has signed with Zenit Saint Petersburg of the Russian VTB United League.

On July 6, 2023, he signed with Tofaş of the Turkish Basketbol Süper Ligi (BSL).

On June 22, 2024, he signed with Gran Canaria of the Spanish Liga ACB.

On July 5, 2025, he signed with Bahçeşehir Koleji of Basketbol Süper Ligi (BSL).

On July 6, 2026, he signed with Zaragoza of the Liga ACB.
