= Lexie Millard =

American cyclist (born 1993)

Personal information
- Full name: Alexandra Millard
- Born: May 20, 1993 (age 33)

Cycling career
- Sport: Cycling
- Current team: LA Sweat
- Discipline: Road
- Role: Rider

Amateur team
- 2020–: LA Sweat

Professional team
- 2017–2019: Team Illuminate

Alexandra "Lexie" Millard (born May 20, 1993) is an American professional racing cyclist, who currently rides for American amateur team LA Sweat.
