= Forward Thinking =

British charitable organization

Forward Thinking is a UK-registered charity founded in 2004 that works in the field of conflict prevention, conflict resolution, and political dialogue. The organisation primarily addresses issues related to the Gulf-MENA region and religious/secular dialogue at a political level.

== Aims and Programmes ==
The organisation has three main aims:

- To promote inclusive dialogues and a durable solution to the Israeli-Palestinian conflict.
- To facilitate political dialogues in, and between, the Gulf-MENA region and Europe to identify areas for greater cooperation.
- To promote greater understanding and engagement between diverse British Muslim communities and organisations, and British policymakers, parliamentarians, and the national media.

and three main areas of activities:

- The Middle East Programme.
- The Women for a Sustainable Future (WSF) network.
- The UK Programme.

=== The Middle East Programme ===
The Middle East Programme engages leaders with political and religious constituency in Israel and Palestine to promote inclusive dialogues and a durable solution to the conflict. Forward Thinking works to engage with those who are perceived as political "hardliners", in the belief that if these communities are not engaged, they will have little incentive to see peace succeed and may become spoilers to the process.

=== Women for a Sustainable Future (WSF) ===
The Women for a Sustainable Future network provides an independent space for women parliamentarians, experts, and diplomats across the Gulf-MENA region to meet with their European counterparts. This space enables the network to address the human, environmental, economic, and social challenges that pose a threat to a global sustainable future.

=== The UK Programme ===
In the UK, Forward Thinking works to promote a greater understanding of the diverse Muslim communities and organisations, and the positive contribution they make to British society at a political and social level.

== Staff ==
Forward Thinking's co-founder and director is Oliver McTernan. Oliver has an established background in conflict resolution and interfaith relationships. He was a visiting fellow of the Weatherhead Centre for International Affairs at Harvard University 2000–2003. He was also responsible for initiating the first post-conflict talks between NATO and the former Yugoslav government. His book, 'Violence in God's Name' explores the role of religion in an age of conflict. He broadcasts regularly on radio and television.

Jordan Morgan is Forward Thinking's Director of Programmes. He is the former Director of the Middle East Programme, former Helsinki Policy Forum Manager, and former UK Programme Manager. He was also formerly a researcher at a think tank specialising in political violence. He studied Geography at Aberystwyth University and holds an MA in Geopolitics, Territory, and Security from King's College London.

Cecily Bayliss is the WSF Programme Manager at Forward Thinking. The WSF network facilitates dialogue between women parliamentarians, government officials, and relevant experts in the Gulf-MENA region and Europe to address challenges that disproportionately impact women’s livelihoods. Prior to joining Forward Thinking, she studied Theology at the University of Edinburgh where she developed a particular interest in Islamic Theology and the role of religion in peacebuilding.

Harry Weeks is a Programme Officer at Forward Thinking. He supports the work of the Middle East Programme to promote an inclusive Israeli-Palestinian peace process. He studied History and Politics at Balliol College, Oxford, where he developed an interest in the politics of the Middle East. He lived in Cairo for one year to study Arabic.

== Funding ==
Forward Thinking is funded by a diverse range of sources including the Irish Department of Foreign Affairs, and a number of Trusts and private donors.
