= Zavier Simpson =

American basketball player (born 1997)

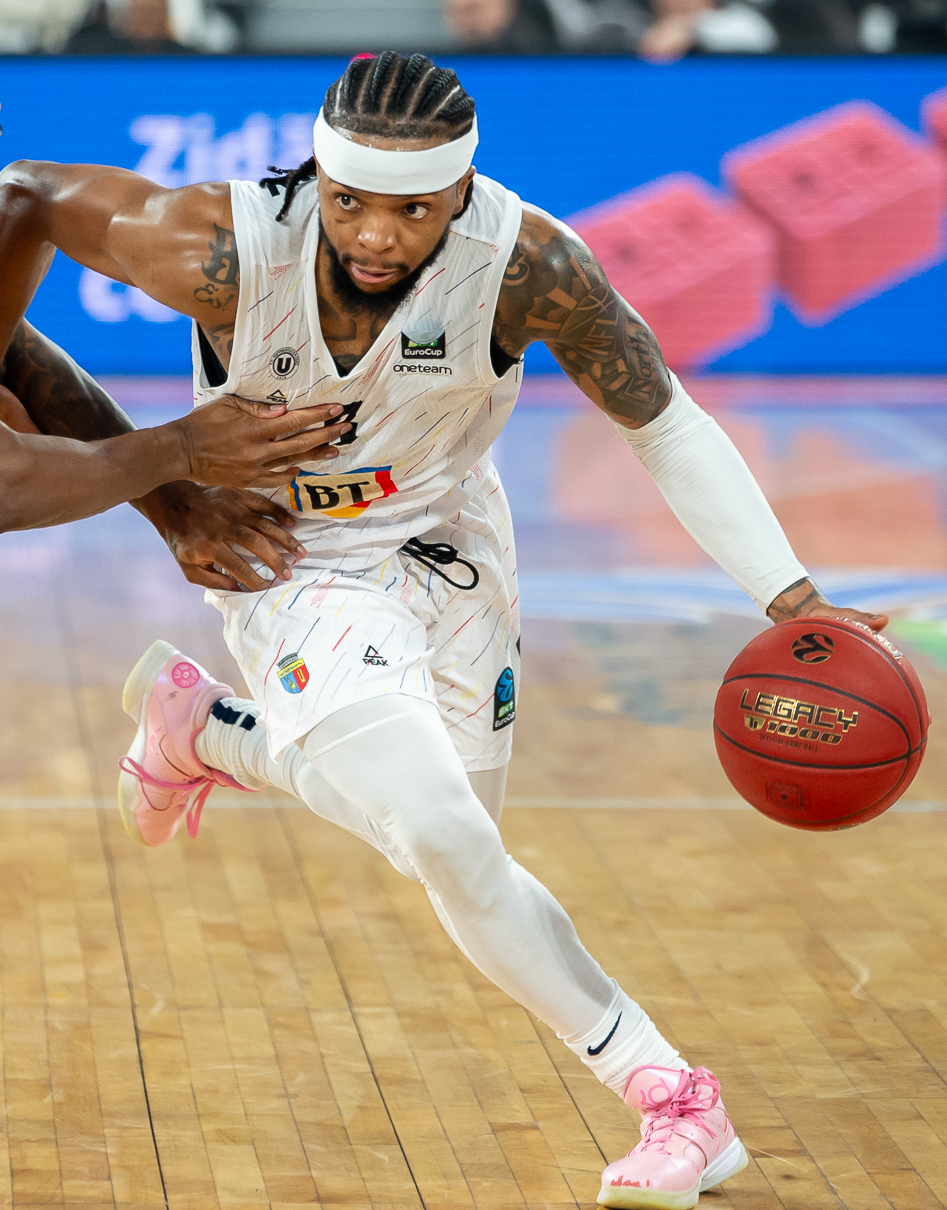
- Simpson with U-BT Cluj-Napoca in 2025

No. 24 – Xinjiang Flying Tigers
- Position: Point guard
- League: CBA

Personal information
- Born: February 11, 1997 (age 29) Lima, Ohio, U.S.
- Listed height: 6 ft 0 in (1.83 m)
- Listed weight: 190 lb (86 kg)

Career information
- High school: Lima Senior (Lima, Ohio)
- College: Michigan (2016–2020)
- NBA draft: 2020: undrafted
- Playing career: 2021–present

Career history
- 2021–2022: Oklahoma City Blue
- 2022: Oklahoma City Thunder
- 2022–2023: Lakeland Magic
- 2023: Grises de Humacao
- 2023–2024: Motor City Cruise
- 2024: Memphis Grizzlies
- 2024–2025: U-BT Cluj-Napoca
- 2025–2026: Ningbo Rockets
- 2026–present: Xinjiang Flying Tigers

Career highlights
- All-EuroCup Second Team (2025); EuroCup assists leader (2025); Romanian League champion (2025); Romanian League Finals MVP (2025); NBA G League Next Up Game (2023); 2× Second-team All-Big Ten (2019, 2020); Big Ten All-Defensive team (2019); Ohio Mr. Basketball (2016)
- Stats at NBA.com
- Stats at Basketball Reference

Zavier Marquis Simpson (born February 11, 1997) is an American professional basketball player for the Xinjiang Flying Tigers of the Chinese Basketball Association (CBA). He played college basketball for the Michigan Wolverines.

Simpson attended Lima Senior High School where he won the 2016 Ohio Mr. Basketball as a senior. Simpson won 2014 Ohio Division III state championship as a sophomore for Lima Central Catholic High School before transferring to Lima Senior High School the following school year. He was part of the 2017–18 team that reached the Championship Game of the 2018 NCAA Division I men's basketball tournament. Simpson was a member of 2017 and 2018 Big Ten Conference men's basketball tournament champions during his first two seasons. He had many of his best games against top-10 opponents as a sophomore. As a junior, he was a 2019 Second team All-Big Ten selection and a Big Ten All-Defensive team honoree and earned the nickname "Captain Hook" for his unusual skill at shooting hook shots. As a senior, he was a 2020 Second team All-Big Ten selection. As a junior he set the current Big Ten men's basketball tournament single-tournament assists record (30) and led the Big Ten Conference in assists as a senior (7.9).

== Early life and high school career ==
Simpson was born on February 11, 1997, in Lima, Ohio to Bobbie Carter and Quincey Simpson. He had served as a ball boy for Lima Senior High School since second grade when his father was an assistant coach for the Lima Senior team. On December 15, 2015, Simpson broke two-time Ohio Mr. Basketball Greg Simpson's Lima Senior High School single-game scoring record by posting 59 points against Fremont Ross High School; Greg Simpson was a cousin who grew up with Zavier's father. On February 2, Simpson posted 65 points against Fremont Ross.

Simpson played his freshman and sophomore seasons for Lima Central Catholic High School before transferring to Lima Senior when his father became head coach there before his junior season. Simpson earned the 2014 Ohio Division III state championship as a sophomore and the 2015 Ohio Associated Press Division I Player of the Year as a junior. Simpson was named 2016 Ohio Mr. Basketball by the Associated Press. Simpson's Lima Senior High School was undefeated until losing in the OHSAA Division I championship game to Westerville South High School, finishing the season 29–1. Simpson also earned the Ohio Boys Basketball Gatorade Player of the Year honor.

=== Recruiting ===
On September 9, 2015, Zavier Simpson committed to playing college basketball for Michigan. By the end of his high school career, he was ranked as the No. 49 player and No. 12 point guard by ESPN, No. 57 player and No. 12 point guard by Scout, No. 65 player and No. 19 point guard by Rivals, and No. 93 player and No. 17 point guard by 247Sports. Austin Davis, Ibi Watson, Jon Teske and Simpson all signed their National Letters of Intent on November 11, 2015. Michigan recruits Simpson, Watson and Teske were all named to the 2015–16 Associated Press Ohio High School Division I Boys Basketball All-State 1st Team. ESPN's Jeff Borzello named Simpson as one of the top 25 entering freshman in the 2016–17 class on April 6, 2016.

College recruiting
Name	Hometown	School	Height	Weight	Commit date
Zavier Simpson; PG	Lima, OH	Lima Senior (OH)	6 ft 0 in (1.83 m)	175 lb (79 kg)	Sep 9, 2016
Zavier Simpson; PG	Recruit ratings: Scout: Rivals: 247Sports: ESPN: (86)				
Overall recruit ranking: Scout: 57 Rivals: 65 247Sports: 93 ESPN: 49
Note: In many cases, Scout, Rivals, 247Sports, On3, and ESPN may conflict in their listings of height and weight.; In these cases, the average was taken. ESPN grades are on a 100-point scale.; Sources: "Michigan 2016 Basketball Commitments". Rivals.; "2016 Michigan Wolverines Recruiting Class". ESPN.; "2016 Team Ranking". Rivals.

== College career ==
=== Freshman season ===
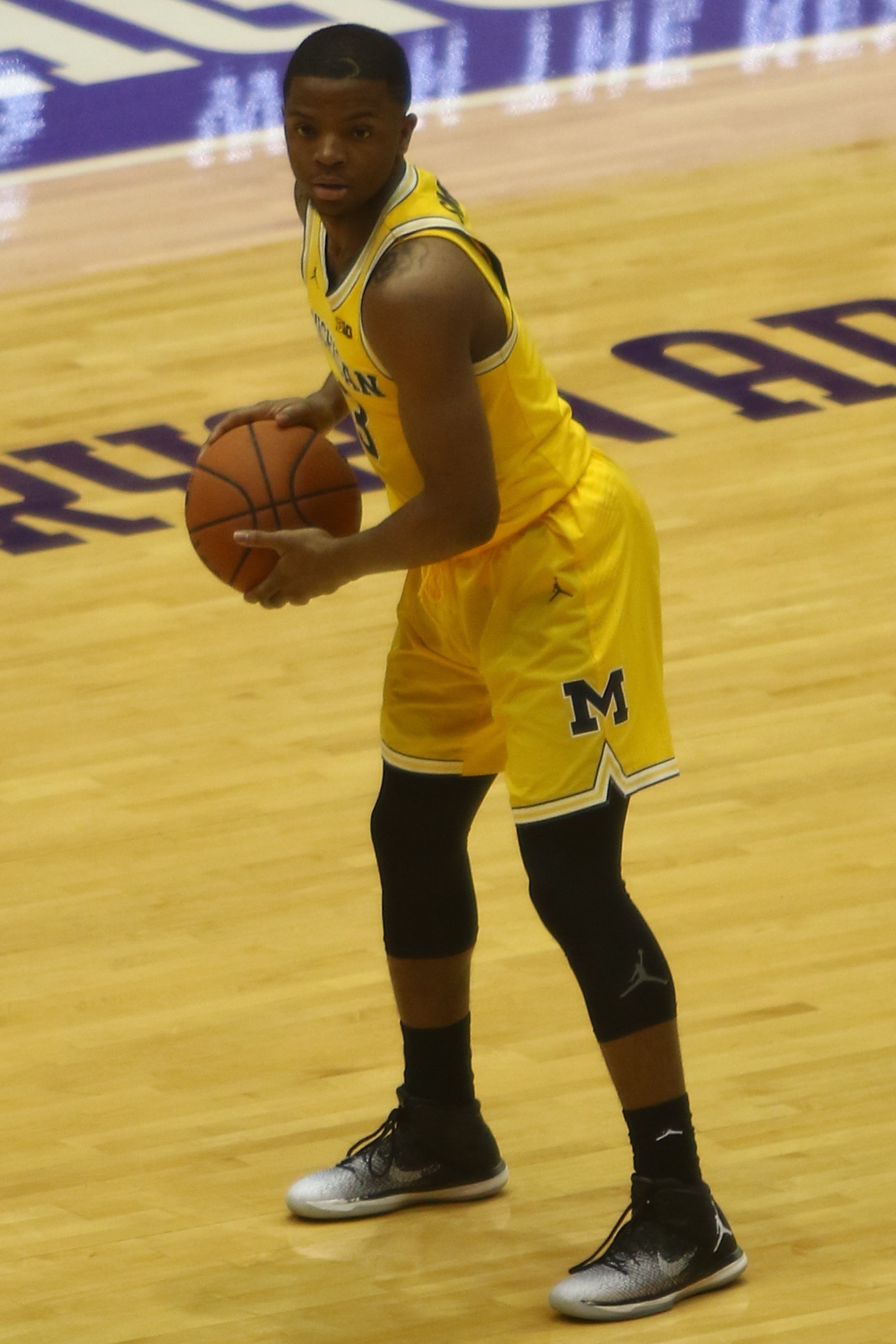
Simpson in 2017

As a freshman, Simpson was part of a 2016–17 Michigan Wolverines team that won the 2017 Big Ten Conference men's basketball tournament. The Wolverines reached the sweet sixteen round of the 2017 NCAA Division I men's basketball tournament. After averaging 1.6 points and 8.7 minutes as a freshman, Simpson changed the spelling of his name prior to his sophomore season from Xavier to Zavier.

=== Sophomore season ===
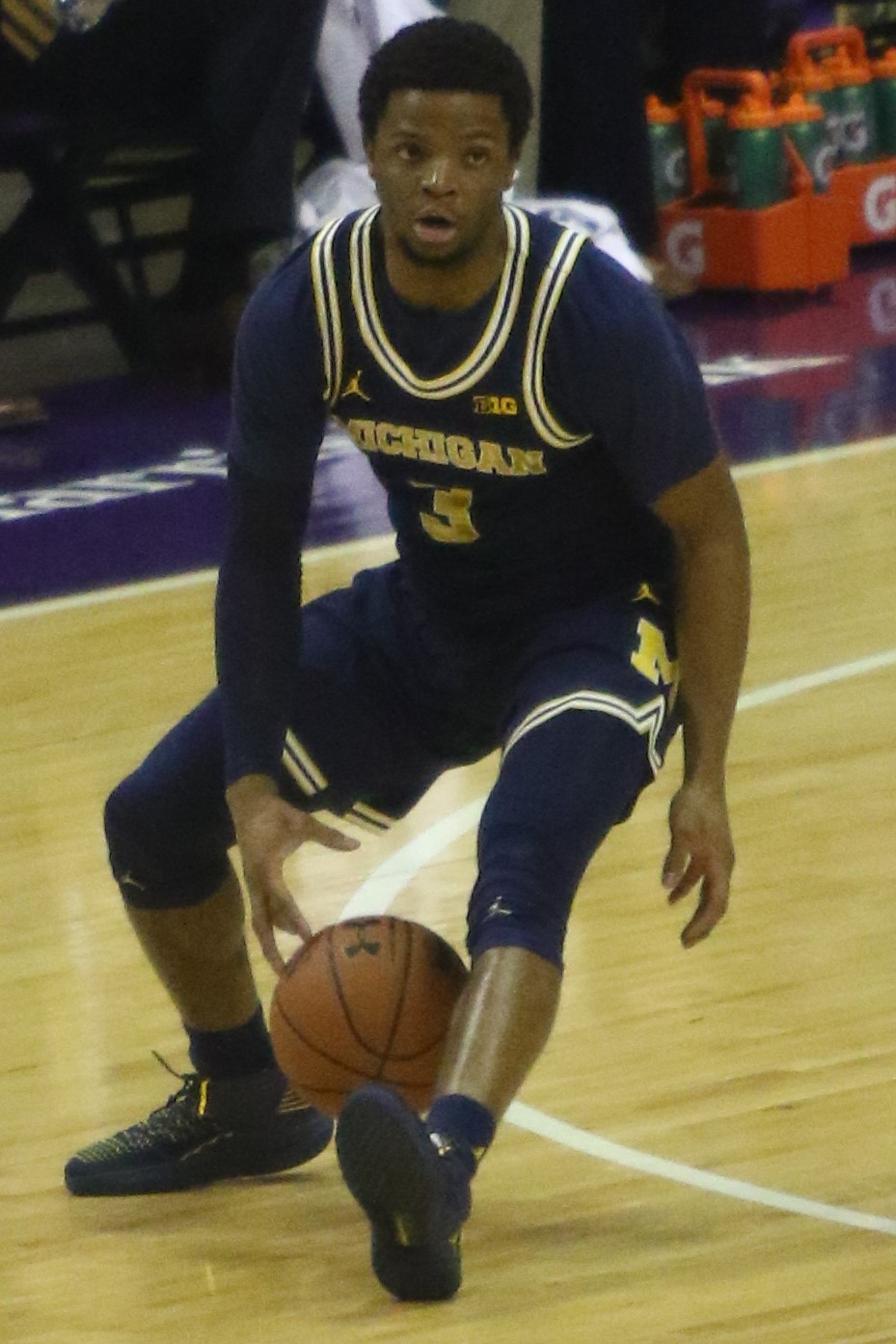
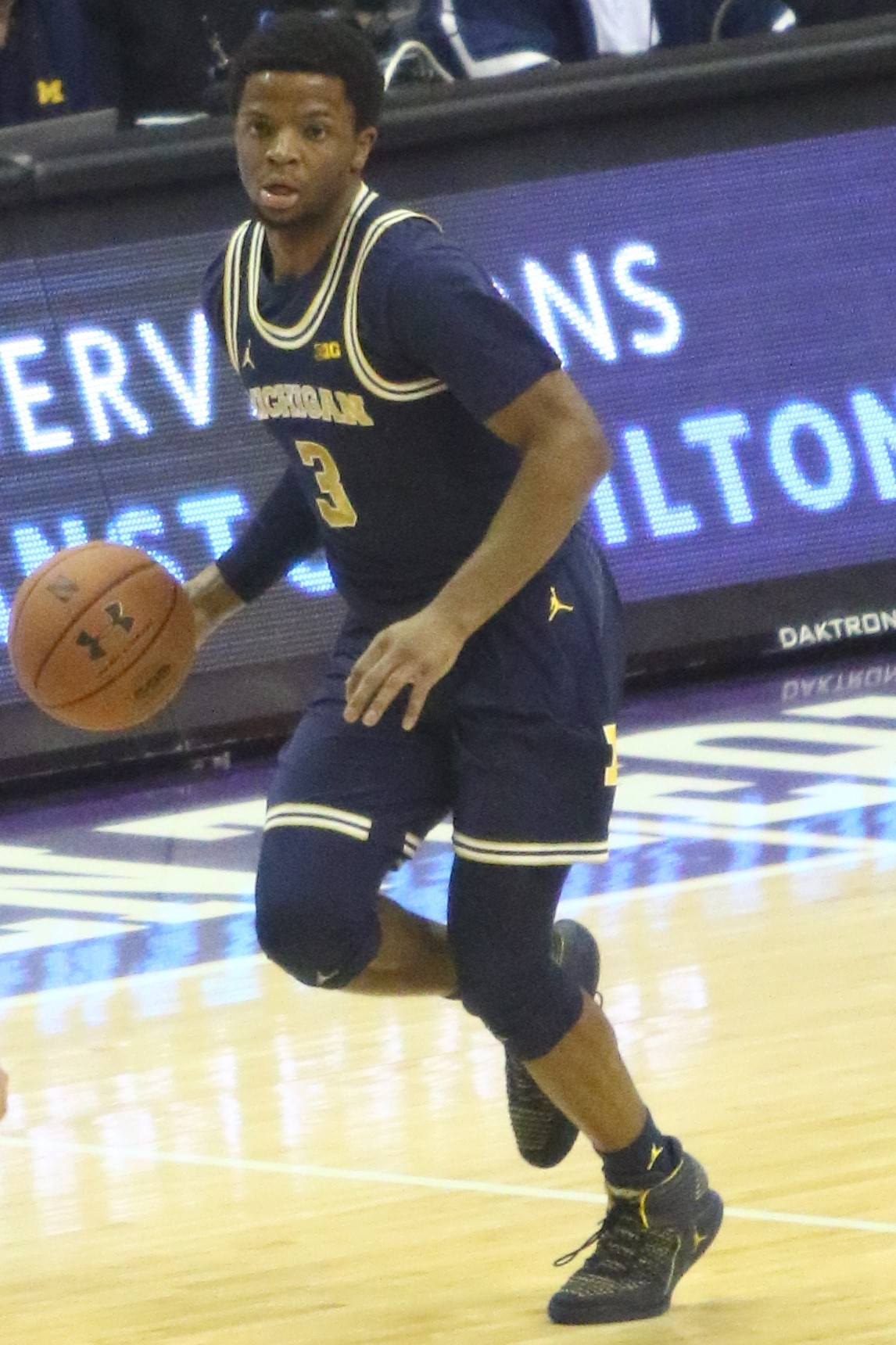
Simpson for the 2017–18 Wolverines

As a sophomore for the 2017–18 Wolverines, Simpson posted his career high 16 points in contest against top 5 rated opponents: On January 13, 2018, Michigan won their rivalry game against (#4 AP Poll/#4 Coaches Poll) Michigan State 82–72. Simpson tallied 16 points in Michigan's first road victory against a top-five ranked team since defeating (#3 AP Poll/#3 Coaches Poll) Michigan State on January 25, 2014; On January 25, 2018, Michigan lost to (#3 AP Poll/#3 Coaches Poll) Purdue 88–92 despite 16 points from Simpson. In two of his other top-5 games, Simpson had 15-point games against both (#5 AP Poll/#7 Coaches Poll) Purdue on January 9, 2018. and (#2 AP Poll/#2 Coaches Poll) Michigan State on March 3, 2018. Although Simpson averaged just 7.3 points per game for the season, in his other games against top-10 opponents he posted double digits: 13 points against (#8 AP Poll/#9 Coaches Poll) Ohio State in Michigan's final home game of the regular season on the February 18, 2018, 10 points on March 4, as Michigan defeated (#8 AP Poll/#8 Coaches Poll) Purdue 75–66, and 10 points in the 2018 NCAA Division I Men's Basketball Championship Game loss to (#2 Coaches Poll/#2 AP Poll) Villanova.

The March 4 victory over Purdue gave Michigan its second consecutive Big Ten tournament championship since the game was the championship game of the 2018 Big Ten Conference men's basketball tournament. Simpson averaged 12.3 points, 4.8 rebounds, 4.0 assists and 1.3 steals in 35 minutes per game for Michigan in its four-game tournament run. On March 22, Michigan defeated Texas A&M 99–72 in the regional semifinals of the 2018 NCAA tournament. Simpson posted a career-high six steals as part of a stat line that included 11 points, 5 assists and 4 rebounds. In the first four games of the tournament, Simpson posted averages of 7.3 points, 5.0 rebounds, 4.5 assists and 2.8 steals to help Michigan reach the Final Four. The team lost in the 2018 NCAA Division I Men's Basketball Championship Game to (#2 Coaches Poll/#2 AP Poll) Villanova. Since the team reached the championship games of both the Big Ten tournament and the NCAA Tournament, Simpson shares the Michigan (and NCAA) single-season games played record (41) with teammates Duncan Robinson, Muhammad-Ali Abdur-Rahkman, Teske and Charles Matthews. Members of the 2010–11 Connecticut Huskies also played 41 games (an NCAA record).

=== Junior season ===
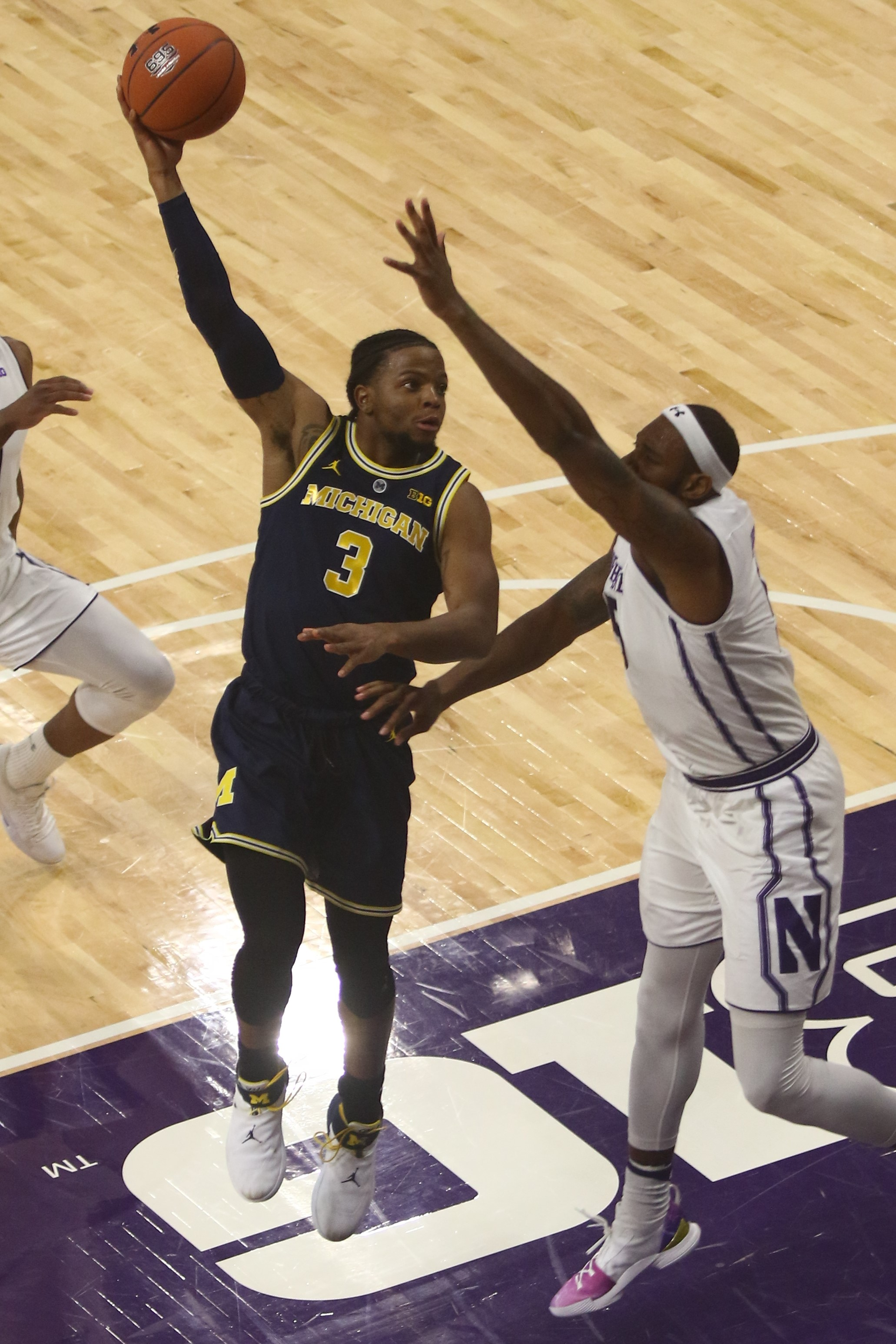
While serving as co-captain for the 2018–19 team as a junior, Simpson earned the nickname "Captain Hook" for making use of the hook shot.

On November 17, 2018, Simpson posted 14 points and 11 rebounds for his first career double-double, to help Michigan defeat George Washington 84–61. On December 30, Michigan defeated Binghamton 74–52. Simpson posted a career-high 10 assists, and one rebound shy of a double-double. On January 10, Michigan defeated Illinois 79–69. Michigan was led by Simpson with a season-high 16 points and improved to 16–0 on the season, matching the school's best start to a season. On January 13, Michigan defeated Northwestern to establish a school record for best start at 17–0 and tied the school's record 17-game win streak on the strength of a career-high 24-point effort by Simpson. On January 19, Simpson posted 10 points and 11 rebounds, for his second career double-double in a loss to Wisconsin. On January 22, Simpson was one of four Big Ten athletes named to the Naismith Defensive Player of the Year Award Top 15 midseason watchlist. On January 29 against Ohio State, Simpson posted 11 points, 10 rebounds and a career-high 12 assists, becoming the sixth player in Michigan program history to record a triple-double. The game marked Simpson's 100th career game with Michigan, becoming the 70th Wolverine to the reach the milestone. Simpson recorded his 300th career assist, becoming the 15th Wolverine to surpass the milestone. On March 3, Simpson posted 12 points and 10 assists, for his third double-double of the season in a win against (#17/#20) Maryland. Following the season, he was a 2019 Second team All-Big Ten selection (coaches and media) and a Big Ten All-Defensive Team honoree. On March 12, the U.S. Basketball Writers Association named Simpson to its 2012–13 Men's All-District V (OH, IN, IL, MI, MN, WI) Team, based upon voting from its national membership. He was named to the National Association of Basketball Coaches Division I All-District 7 second team on March 21, as selected and voted on by member coaches of the NABC, making him eligible for the 2019 NABC Coaches' Division I All-America team. Over the course of his junior season, he served as captain and - unusually for a guard - developed a reliable hook shot, earning the nickname "Captain Hook".

Simpson for the 2018–19 team

On March 15, Michigan opened its 2019 Big Ten Conference men's basketball tournament play with a 74–53 victory over Iowa in the quarterfinals. Simpson posted 10 points and 11 assists for his fourth career double-double. The next day Simpson posted 15 points and nine assists in a 76–49 victory over Minnesota, helping Michigan advance to the Big Ten tournament final for the third consecutive season. With his nine assists in the game, Simpson became the 10th Wolverine in program history to surpass 400 career assists. On March 17 in the championship game, Simpson posted six points and ten assists in a 60–65 loss to Michigan State. Simpson finished the tournament with a tournament-record 30 assists in three games, surpassing the previous record of 29 assists set by Mateen Cleaves in 1999, and was subsequently named to the All-Tournament Team. He achieved the 30 assists while only making two turnovers. On March 21, Simpson posted four points and ten assists in a 74–55 victory over Montana in the first round of the 2019 NCAA tournament. With his 10 assists in the game, Simpson set a single-season program record for the most games with 10 or more assists in a season with eight games. For the season, he led Michigan in minute played 33.9/game and led the Big Ten in Assist:Turnover ratio (3.3).

=== Senior season ===
Prior to the season Simpson was named to the 10-man preseason All-Big Ten team. He was also named to the preseason Cousy Award 20-man watchlist. The team began the season unranked but receiving votes in the national polls. On November 22, Michigan defeated Houston Baptist 111–68 as Simpson posted 22 points and 14 assists, both career-highs, for his fifth career double-double (first with 20 points). The 14 single-game assists tied a pair of 1987 games by Gary Grant for second in school history behind Derrick Walton's 15-assist game set in 2017. Michigan's 111 points were the most points scored in a game since a 112–64 victory over Indiana in 1998. On December 3, in a 43–58 loss to Louisville during the ACC–Big Ten Challenge, Simpson posted three assists in the game, becoming the fourth Wolverine in program history to surpass 500 career assists. He was named to the midseason watchlist for the Wooden Award. On January 17, with six assists in the game, Simpson moved into second place on Michigan's all-time assists list with 579.

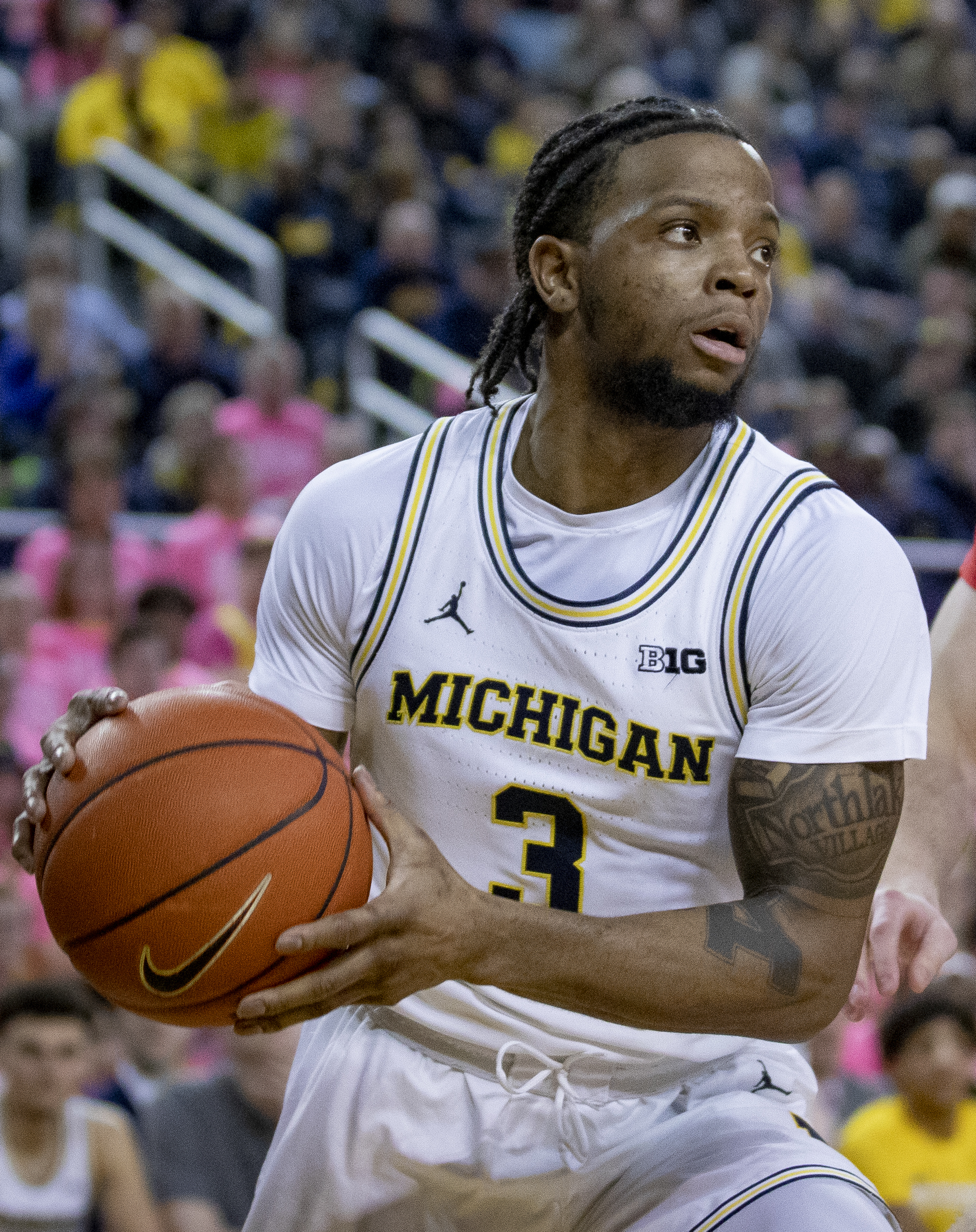
Simpson for the 2019–20 Wolverines

On January 26 at 3:03 AM, Simpson was the driver of Michigan Athletic director Warde Manuel's family vehicle when it made contact with a street sign and a utility pole, and gave a false name to the police regarding his involvement at the scene of the crash. Simpson was suspended one game for missing team curfew on January 27, causing him to miss the January 28 game against Nebraska. This was the first game he missed in his career, snapping his streak of 135 consecutive games played. He was reinstated on January 31. On February 4, in a 58–61 loss to Ohio State, Simpson posted 15 points and five assists, becoming the second player in Michigan program history to surpass 600 career assists. On February 16, in an 89–65 victory over Indiana, Simpson posted 12 points and 11 assists, for his ninth career double-double. With the win, Simpson and Teske became the winningest players in program history with 105 career victories. Simpson also set a program record for the most games with 10 or more assists (15). On February 19 in a 60–52 victory over Rutgers, Simpson posted 16 points, six rebounds, five assists and two steals. Simpson became the fourth player in program history to surpass 1,000 career points and 500 career assists, following Antoine Joubert, Gary Grant and Rumeal Robinson. Simpson was one of 10 players named a semifinalist for the Naismith Defensive Player of the Year Award, and the lone Big Ten athlete. On February 27 in a 74–81 loss to Wisconsin, Simpson posted a career-high 32 points, six assists and five rebounds. Following the season, he was named a 2020 Second team All-Big Ten selection by both the coaches and media. Simpson led the Big Ten conference in assists (7.9) for the season.

== Professional career ==
=== Oklahoma City Thunder / Blue (2021–2022) ===
On September 17, 2020, Simpson signed his first professional contract with Science City Jena of the German ProA, but left the team before the start of the season. After going undrafted in the 2020 NBA draft, he signed with the Los Angeles Lakers on November 18, 2020 but was waived in December. He landed with the Oklahoma City Blue of the NBA G League, making his debut in their season opener on February 11, 2021. In 15 games, he averaged 9.8 points, 4.3 rebounds and 6.1 assists in 28.5 minutes.

Simpson joined the Los Angeles Lakers for the 2021 NBA Summer League and on October 15, 2021, he signed with the Oklahoma City Thunder, but was waived the same day subsequently re-signing with the Blue on October 28. In 47 games, he averaged 12.7 points, 4.6 rebounds and 6.2 assists in 30.3 minutes per game. On April 5, 2022, he signed with the Thunder for the rest of the season. Simpson made his NBA debut against the Portland Trail Blazers on April 5, 2022, where he played 44 minutes and recorded 10 points, 5 assists, 3 rebounds, and 2 blocks. In his second game the next night, he tallied 11 assists against the Utah Jazz. In the final game of the season on April 10, he scored 17 points against the Los Angeles Clippers.

=== Lakeland Magic (2022–2023) ===
Simpson joined the Orlando Magic for the 2022 NBA Summer League and he eventually signed with the Magic on September 24, 2022, but he was waived by the team on October 8. On November 3, 2022, Simpson was named to the opening night roster for the Lakeland Magic. He was named to the G League's inaugural Next Up Game for the 2022–23 season.

=== Grises de Humacao (2023) ===
On April 3, 2023, Simpson signed with Grises de Humacao of the Puerto Rican league. He was released on April 25.

=== Motor City Cruise (2023–2024) ===
The Detroit Pistons's NBA G League affiliate, Motor City Cruise acquired the returning player rights to Simpson in exchange for the 2024 NBA G League draft second round pick plus the returning rights for Reggie Perry and Devontae Cacok on July 27, 2023. That month, Simpson joined the Pistons for the 2023 NBA Summer League and on October 2, he signed with them. However, he was waived on October 21 and nine days later, he joined the Motor City Cruise where he played in 48 games and averaged 19.5 points, 4.8 rebounds, 8.3 assists and 1.3 steals in 36.6 minutes.

=== Memphis Grizzlies (2024) ===
On March 30, 2024, Simpson signed a 10-day contract with the Memphis Grizzlies and on April 9, he signed a second 10-day contract. Simpson helped lead the Charlotte Hornets to a 7–1 record during the 2024 NBA Summer League by averaging 13 points, 4 rebounds, 6.7 assists, 1.4 steals, and 1 block in seven appearances, but with the team having drafted KJ Simpson 42nd overall in the 2024 NBA draft, Simpson did not get signed by the team.

=== U-BT Cluj-Napoca (2024–2025) ===
On July 26, 2024, Simpson signed with U-BT Cluj-Napoca of the Liga Națională de Baschet Masculin.Simpson was a key contributor for U-BT Cluj-Napoca in the BKT EuroCup, appearing in 20 games and posting impressive all-around numbers. He averaged 17.8 points, 8.0 assists (leading the competition), 3.8 rebounds (1.0 offensive), and 1.2 steals per game, with a performance index rating (PIR) of 20.9. His shooting efficiency was notable, recording 52.8% on two-point field goals, 35.7% from three-point range, and 84.3% from the free-throw line. His outstanding season earned him a spot on the All-EuroCup Second Team, and he also finished as the EuroCup assists leader for the 2024–2025 campaign.

Domestically, Simpson played a key role in U-BT Cluj-Napoca’s championship run. Despite missing Game 4 of the finals, he was named Finals MVP after scoring at least 20 points in each of the games he played. His averages in the finals were 22.7 points, 4.5 rebounds, and 4.2 assists per game.In his final appearance of the series, Simpson delivered a standout performance, recording 26 points, 4 rebounds, and 3 assists in just over 32 minutes on the court. He shot 7/9 from two-point range, 3/10 from beyond the arc, and a perfect 3/3 from the free-throw line, finishing with a PIR of 24.Across the entire playoffs, he averaged 18.3 points, 5.0 assists, and 4.0 rebounds per game. During the regular season, Simpson contributed solid numbers with averages of 13.6 points, 5.8 assists, and 3.2 rebounds per game.

=== Ningbo Rockets (2025–2026) ===
On July 4, 2025, Simpson signed a summer league contract with the Los Angeles Clippers. On August 29, Simpson signed with the Ningbo Rockets of the Chinese Basketball Association.

== Career statistics ==
Legend
GP	Games played	GS	Games started	MPG	Minutes per game
FG%	Field goal percentage	3P%	3-point field goal percentage	FT%	Free throw percentage
RPG	Rebounds per game	APG	Assists per game	SPG	Steals per game
BPG	Blocks per game	PPG	Points per game	**Bold**	Career high

=== NBA ===
Year	Team	GP	GS	MPG	FG%	3P%	FT%	RPG	APG	SPG	BPG	PPG
2021–22	Oklahoma City	4	**4**	**43.5**	**.365**	.125	**1.000**	**5.3**	**7.5**	**1.3**	**1.0**	**11.0**
2023–24	Memphis	**7**	0	23.1	.315	**.294**	.750	2.9	3.6	1.0	.4	6.0
Career		11	4	30.5	.340	.240	.889	3.7	5.0	1.1	.6	7.8

=== College ===
Year	Team	GP	GS	MPG	FG%	3P%	FT%	RPG	APG	SPG	BPG	PPG
2016–17	Michigan	38	0	8.7	.372	.263	**.710**	.6	1.0	.5	**.1**	1.6
2017–18	Michigan	**41***	29	26.5	.467	.286	.516	3.2	3.7	1.3	.0	7.3
2018–19	Michigan	37	**37**	**33.8**	.434	.308	.667	**5.0**	6.6	**1.4**	**.1**	8.8
2019–20	Michigan	30	30	33.7	**.476**	**.360**	.574	4.5	**7.9**	1.0	**.1**	**12.9**
Career		146	96	25.2	.455	.314	.590	3.3	4.6	1.1	.1	7.3

*	Led NCAA Division I

== See also ==
- Michigan Wolverines men's basketball statistical leaders
