= Lexi VonderLieth =

American professional surfer (born 1984)

Lexi VonderLieth (born August 9, 1984, as Alexis Jodeane Von DerLieth) is an American professional surfer. In 2004, VonderLeith became a professional surfer and has been ranked on the Association of Surfing Professionals Tour since that time.

Vonderlieth was born and raised in Malibu, California. She attended Malibu High School, where she graduated in 2002. Throughout high school, she began her surfing career, where she was ranked 2nd in the nation. After high school, VonderLieth wanted to go to college before she started her professional surfing career. She began attending Pepperdine University in 2003 and graduated in 2007. While at Pepperdine, Vonderlieth fell in love with combining surfing with film. VonderLieth graduated with a BA in communications and found her love in marketing and advertising. Vonderlieth currently lives in Los Angeles, California, and is no longer competing on the ASP World Tour. In 2016, Vonderlieth graduated with an MBA in marketing and was recognised as one of the top 30 women in advertising for two consecutive years.
