= Lexi Berg =

Swedish-American singer/songwriter

- Born: Alexandra Berglöf
- Origin: London, United Kingdom
- Genres: Indie Pop; Alternative
- Occupations: Singer; Songwriter
- Instruments: Vocals, piano
- Years active: 2019–present
- Labels: East West Records, Warner Music UK
- Website: lexiberg.com

Lexi Berg (born Alexandra Berglöf) is a Swedish-American singer and songwriter based in London, United Kingdom. She first became known for her self-released debut single "What If", which became part of the soundtrack for the critically acclaimed 2020 Netflix drama Pieces of a Woman starring Vanessa Kirby. She has since signed with East West Records, a label under Warner Music UK, and released the EP Empire of One in September 2021.

== Biography ==
Berg was born in Stockholm, Sweden, the first child of economist Erik Berglöf and writer Annie Berglöf (née Maccoby). She is the older sister of playwright Katarina Berglöf. She learned how to play the piano from her mother at the age of five while they lived in a houseboat in Stockholm. She later studied classical piano and eventually trained at Sweden's Royal School of Music. When she was 13 years old, she was scouted by Swedish record labels and offered a recording contract, but she refused it and decided to focus on her formal education. She studied history at the University of Edinburgh.

After graduating from college and a brief foray in dance music writing and giving singing lessons, a play written by her sister about their late uncle inspired Berg to begin writing music and recording demos. She sent them to Faris Badwan, lead vocalist of the English rock band The Horrors, who liked the songs and offered to be her music producer. Their collaboration produced the songs "What If", "Take Off Your Disguise", and "Where Will We Be". Berg released and promoted all three songs independently and pitched them to blogs and various music streaming services. This led to "What If" being included in the soundtrack for the 2020 Netflix film Pieces of a Woman starring Vanessa Kirby, which catapulted Berg into the limelight. In December 2019, she signed record deal with East West Records, a music label under Warner Music UK. Since signing with the label, she has collaborated with several musicians and producers like Jonathan Quarmby, Jimmy Hogarth, Jim Eliot, Benjamin Francis Leftwich, Sacha Skarbek, and Wayne Hector to write and produce songs for her EP Empire of One, which was released on 24 September 2021.

Berg cites ABBA, Fleetwood Mac, Stevie Nicks, Florence Welch, Adele, The Beatles and Celine Dion as her inspirations.

== Discography ==
Extended Plays

- Empire of One (2021)

Singles

- "Empire of One" (Released on 24 September 2021)
- "Lonely World" (Released on 20 August 2021)
- "Midnight Sun" (Released on 23 July 2021)
- "Helpless to Help You" (Released on 11 June 2021)
- "Into the Sea" (Released on 14 May 2021)
- "Where Will We Be" (Released on 19 June 2020)
- "Take Off Your Disguise" (Released on 16 October 2019)
- "What If" (Released on 4 September 2019)
