= Lexie Agresti =

French art historian and transgender activist

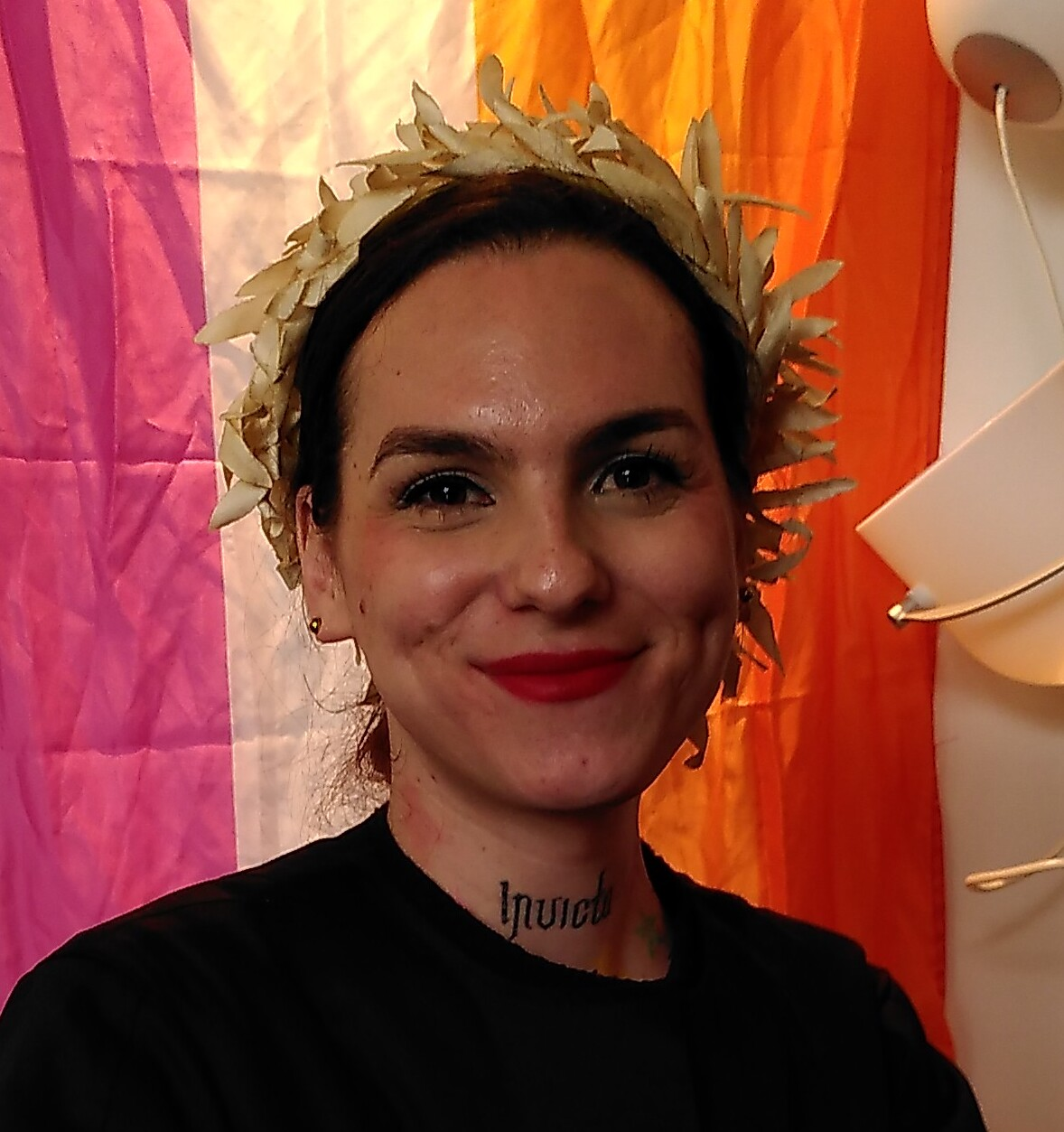
- Agresti in 2024
- Born: 20 June 1995 (age 31)
- Education: École du Louvre
- Occupations: art historian writer activist

Lexie Agresti (born 20 June 1995) is a French art historian, author, and transgender rights activist. She authored the book Une histoire de genres in 2021.

== Biography ==
Agresti grew up in Tours. She studied art history and anthropology at the École du Louvre in Paris.

Agresti is a transgender woman and began her gender transition in 2017. She began documenting her transition, and posting about transgender rights activism and LGBTQIA+ acceptance on her Instagram account "Aggressively Trans".

In February 2021, Agresti published her the book Une histoire de genres.

In 2024, she was invited to testify in the Senate regarding a proposed law that would regulate medical practices regarding gender-affirming care for minors.
