= Indian Trail, North Carolina =

- Town
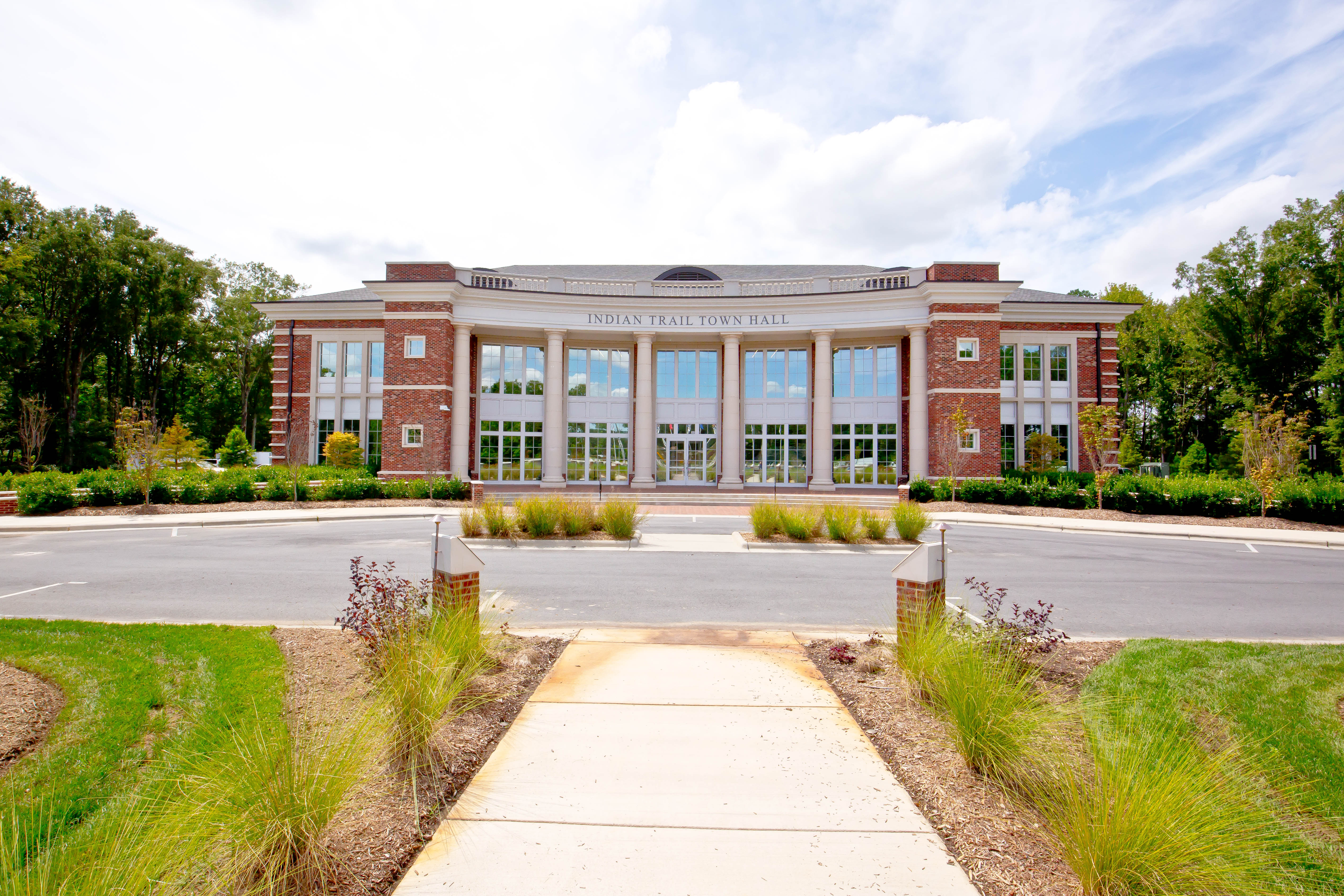
- Indian Trail Town Hall

- Seal
- Motto: "Crossing Paths"
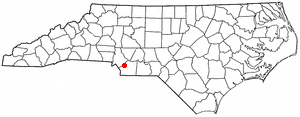
- Location in the state of North Carolina
- Coordinates: 35°05′59″N 80°35′20″W
- Country: United States
- State: North Carolina
- County: Union
- Incorporated: 1907

Area
  - Total: 22.53 sq mi (58.36 km^{2})
  - Land: 22.38 sq mi (57.97 km^{2})
  - Water: 0.15 sq mi (0.39 km^{2})
- Elevation: 672.5 ft (205.0 m)

Population (2020)
  - Total: 39,997
  - Density: 1,786.9/sq mi (689.91/km^{2})
- Time zone: UTC−5 (EST)
  - Summer (DST): UTC−4 (EDT)
- ZIP code: 28079
- Area codes: 704 980
- FIPS code: 37-33560
- GNIS feature ID: 2405887
- Website: www.indiantrail.org

Indian Trail is a town in Union County, North Carolina, United States. A southeastern suburb of Charlotte and part of the Charlotte metropolitan area, Indian Trail has grown rapidly in the 21st century due to its close proximity to Charlotte and its appeal as a residential community for commuters, going from 1,942 residents in 1990 to 39,997 in 2020.

== History ==
Founded on March 12, 1861, the town holds a history of traders traveling along the "Indian Trail," which ran from Petersburg, Virginia, to the Waxhaw Indians and gold mining areas. Indian Trail was first a farming community; however, German and Scot-Irish and Irish settlers began to move into the area due to its geographical location. In 1874, the Seaboard Coast Line Railroad was built between the cities Charlotte and Monroe. The railroad, which runs through the town, brought prosperity to the area. Indian Trail was incorporated as a town in 1907, with established city limits based upon a one-half mile radius from the intersection of Indian Trail Road and the Seaboard Railroad. The historic rail depot at the intersection still stands, and is currently occupied by an auction business. The rail line is now operated by CSX Transportation.

== Geography ==
Located in the southern portion of the Piedmont region of North Carolina, Indian Trail is a rapidly growing suburb approximately 10 miles southeast of Charlotte, in Union County. Indian Trail is located in the northwestern portion of Union County, which is among the 10 fastest-growing counties in the United States. It is bordered by seven other municipalities, in addition to unincorporated portions of Union County. Its proximity to Charlotte and the regional transportation network it enjoys should continue to generate growth and development within its boundaries.

According to the United States Census Bureau, the town has a total area of 22.1 square miles (57 km^{2}), of which 22.1 square miles (57 km^{2}) is land and 0.04 square miles (0.10 km^{2}) (0.26%) is water.

== Demographics ==
Historical population
Census	Pop.	Note	%±
1910	154		—
1920	224		45.5%
1930	209		−6.7%
1940	225		7.7%
1950	308		36.9%
1960	364		18.2%
1970	405		11.3%
1980	811		100.2%
1990	1,942		139.5%
2000	11,905		513.0%
2010	33,518		181.5%
2020	39,997		19.3%
2025 (est.)	44,303	▲	10.8%
U.S. Decennial Census

=== 2020 census ===
Indian Trail racial composition
Race	Number	Percentage
White (non-Hispanic)	26,412	66.03%
Black or African American (non-Hispanic)	4,520	11.3%
Native American	115	0.29%
Asian	1,091	2.73%
Pacific Islander	19	0.05%
Other/Mixed	2,082	5.21%
Hispanic or Latino	5,758	14.4%

As of the 2020 census, Indian Trail had a population of 39,997. The median age was 36.6 years. 28.6% of residents were under the age of 18 and 10.8% of residents were 65 years of age or older. For every 100 females there were 96.3 males, and for every 100 females age 18 and over there were 91.7 males age 18 and over.

99.2% of residents lived in urban areas, while 0.8% lived in rural areas.

There were 13,287 households in Indian Trail, including 10,210 families. Of all households, 45.8% had children under the age of 18 living in them, 62.8% were married-couple households, 11.3% were households with a male householder and no spouse or partner present, and 20.6% were households with a female householder and no spouse or partner present. About 15.9% of all households were made up of individuals, and 5.8% had someone living alone who was 65 years of age or older.

There were 13,712 housing units, of which 3.1% were vacant. The homeowner vacancy rate was 0.9% and the rental vacancy rate was 6.3%.

=== 2010 census ===
As of the census of 2010, there were 33,518 people, 11,121 households, and 9,060 families in the town. The population density was 1,545.4 people per square mile. The racial makeup of the town was 81.00% White, 10.0% African American, 0.5% Native American, 1.8% Asian, 0.0% Pacific Islander, 4.4% from other races, and 2.3% from two or more races. Hispanic or Latino of any race were 10.9% of the population.

Of the 11,121 households 48.7% had children under the age of 18 living with them, 66.1% were married couples living together, 10.9% had a female householder with no husband present, and 18.5% were non-families. 18.5% of households were one person and 4.1% were one person aged 65 or older. The average household size was 3.01 and the average family size was 3.35.

The age distribution was 18.9% under 10 years, 15.9% from 10 to 19, 9.6% from 20 to 29, 17.7% from 30 to 39, 17.3% from 40 to 49, 9.9% from 50 to 59, 6.6% from 60 to 69, 2.9% from 70 to 79, and 1.1% who were 80 years of age or older. The median age was 33.7 years. Females make up 50.9% of the population.

The median household income was $66,333. The per capita income for the town was $26,096. About 6.3% of the population is below the poverty line.

== Notable industries ==
- RSC Brands

== Notable people ==
- Mark Harris, U.S. representative
- Sam Howell, NFL quarterback for the Dallas Cowboys
