= 2024 EuroCup Basketball Playoffs =

Europe secondary club basketball tournament

The 2024 EuroCup Basketball Playoffs began on 5 March with the eighthfinals and ended on 12 April 2024 with the Finals to decide the champions of the 2023–24 EuroCup Basketball. A total of 12 teams from nine countries competed in the playoffs.

Times are CET/CEST, (Note: CET (UTC+1) for dates up to 29 March 2024 (eighthfinals, quarter-finals and first two legs of semi-finals), and CEST (UTC+2) for dates thereafter (third leg of semi-finals and finals).) as listed by Euroleague Basketball (local times, if different, are in parentheses).

== Format ==
In the playoffs, teams played against each other in a knockout tournament into four rounds from eighthfinals to finals. At the end of the regular season, the six teams from each group with the most wins qualified for the playoffs. The two top teams from each regular season group received a bye and qualified directly to the quarterfinals. The remaining eight qualified teams entered the eighthfinals to compete in a single-game format in which the third-placed teams of each group faced off against the sixth-placed teams of the opposite groups and the fourth-placed teams of each group faced off against the fifth-placed teams of the opposite groups. The four winning teams from eighthfinals entered the quarterfinals to faced off in a single-game format in the home of the two top teams from each regular season group. The higher-placed regular season team in each matchup enjoyed home court advantage in eighthfinals and quarterfinals. From semifinals onwards, teams played in best-of-three series with the first leg and third leg, if necessary, in the home court of the higher-placed regular season team to crown the EuroCup champion.

== Qualified teams ==
Pos	Group A	Group B	Qualification
1	(French Federation of Basketball) Paris Basketball	(French Federation of Basketball) Mincidelice JL Bourg	Advance to quarterfinals
2	(Israeli Basketball Association) Hapoel Shlomo Tel Aviv	(Romanian Basketball Federation) U-BT Cluj-Napoca	Advance to quarterfinals
3	(British Basketball) London Lions	(Spanish Basketball Federation) Dreamland Gran Canaria	Advance to eighthfinals
4	(Basketball Federation of Ukraine) Prometey	(German Basketball Federation) ratiopharm Ulm	Advance to eighthfinals
5	(Spanish Basketball Federation) Joventut Badalona	(Hellenic Basketball Federation) Aris Midea	Advance to eighthfinals
6	(Turkish Basketball Federation) Beşiktaş Emlakjet	(Turkish Basketball Federation) Türk Telekom	Advance to eighthfinals

Source: EuroCup

== Bracket ==
Eighthfinals
(German Basketball Federation) ratiopharm Ulm	79
(Spanish Basketball Federation) Joventut Badalona	88
(British Basketball) London Lions	100
(Turkish Basketball Federation) Türk Telekom	77
(Basketball Federation of Ukraine) Prometey	95
(Hellenic Basketball Federation) Aris Midea	67
(Spanish Basketball Federation) Dreamland Gran Canaria	78
(Turkish Basketball Federation) Beşiktaş Emlakjet	80

Quarterfinals
(French Federation of Basketball) Paris Basketball	86
(Spanish Basketball Federation) Joventut Badalona	70
(Romanian Basketball Federation) U-BT Cluj-Napoca	79
(British Basketball) London Lions	91
(French Federation of Basketball) Mincidelice JL Bourg	95
(Basketball Federation of Ukraine) Prometey	82
(Israeli Basketball Association) Hapoel Shlomo Tel Aviv	89
(Turkish Basketball Federation) Beşiktaş Emlakjet	94

Semifinals
(French Federation of Basketball) Paris Basketball	99	93	2
(British Basketball) London Lions	86	85	0
(French Federation of Basketball) Mincidelice JL Bourg	86	71	89	2
(Turkish Basketball Federation) Beşiktaş Emlakjet	74	82	63	1

Finals
(French Federation of Basketball) Paris Basketball	77	89	2
(French Federation of Basketball) Mincidelice JL Bourg	64	81	0

== Eighthfinals ==
=== Summary ===
The eighthfinals were played on 5 and 6 March 2024.

Home team	Score	Away team
London Lions (British Basketball)	100–77	(Turkish Basketball Federation) Türk Telekom
ratiopharm Ulm (German Basketball Federation)	79–88	(Spanish Basketball Federation) Joventut Badalona
Dreamland Gran Canaria (Spanish Basketball Federation)	78–80	(Turkish Basketball Federation) Beşiktaş Emlakjet
Prometey (Basketball Federation of Ukraine)	95–67	(Hellenic Basketball Federation) Aris Midea

=== Matches ===
5 March 2024	ratiopharm Ulm (German Basketball Federation)	79–88	(Spanish Basketball Federation) Joventut Badalona	Neu-Ulm, Germany
19:30	Scoring by quarter: 19–27, 13–23, 21–15, 26–23
	Pts: Williams 20; Rebs: Williams 10; Asts: Núñez 5 PIR: Williams 25	Boxscore	Pts: Feliz 28; Rebs: Brodziansky 7 Asts: Feliz 6 PIR: Feliz 36	Arena: ratiopharm Arena; Attendance: 2,364; Referees: Oļegs Latiševs, Igor Dragojević, Adar Peer

6 March 2024	Prometey (Basketball Federation of Ukraine)	95–67	(Hellenic Basketball Federation) Aris Midea	Riga, Latvia
18:00 (19:00 EET)	Scoring by quarter: 28–17, 23–15, 23–18, 21–17
	Pts: three players 16; Rebs: Balvín 9 Asts: March 7 PIR: Balvín 31	Boxscore	Pts: Harrell 20; Rebs: Harrell 7 Asts: Toliopoulos 5 PIR: Harrell 24	Arena: Arena Riga; Attendance: 3,343; Referees: Juan Carlos García, Amit Balak, Uroš Obrknežević

6 March 2024	London Lions (British Basketball)	100–77	(Turkish Basketball Federation) Türk Telekom	London, United Kingdom
19:00 (18:00 WET)	Scoring by quarter: 32–23, 28–21, 20–17, 20–16
	Pts: Nwaba 19; Rebs: Olaseni 8 Asts: Phillip 5 PIR: Olaseni 26	Boxscore	Pts: Wallace 25; Rebs: three players 4 Asts: three players 4 PIR: Wallace 28	Arena: The CopperBox Arena; Attendance: 3,600; Referees: Piotr Pastusiak, Jordi Aliaga, Hugues Thépénier

6 March 2024	Dreamland Gran Canaria (Spanish Basketball Federation)	78–80	(Turkish Basketball Federation) Beşiktaş Emlakjet	Las Palmas, Spain
21:00 (20:00 WET)	Scoring by quarter: 22–14, 14–22, 21–18, 21–26
	Pts: Lammers 14; Rebs: Shurna 6 Asts: Albicy 8 PIR: Lammers 17	Boxscore	Pts: Mathews 14; Rebs: Simonović 9 Asts: Needham 5 PIR: Simonović 16	Arena: Gran Canaria Arena; Attendance: 6,407; Referees: Borys Ryzhyk, Ioannis Foufis, Leandro Lezcano

== Quarterfinals ==
=== Summary ===
The quarterfinals were played on 12–14 March 2024.

Home team	Score	Away team
Paris Basketball (French Federation of Basketball)	86–70	(Spanish Basketball Federation) Joventut Badalona
U-BT Cluj-Napoca (Romanian Basketball Federation)	79–91	(British Basketball) London Lions
Mincidelice JL Bourg (French Federation of Basketball)	95–82	(Basketball Federation of Ukraine) Prometey
Hapoel Shlomo Tel Aviv (Israeli Basketball Association)	89–94	(Turkish Basketball Federation) Beşiktaş Emlakjet

=== Matches ===
12 March 2024	Mincidelice JL Bourg (French Federation of Basketball)	95–82	(Basketball Federation of Ukraine) Prometey	Bourg-en-Bresse, France
19:30	Scoring by quarter: 17–17, 28–27, 34–13, 16–25
	Pts: Mike, Morgan 17; Rebs: Mike, Morgan 7 Asts: Lewis 7 PIR: Mike 25	Boxscore	Pts: Balvín 19; Rebs: Balvín 14; Asts: Kennedy, March 5 PIR: Kennedy 27	Arena: Ekinox; Attendance: 3,528; Referees: Milivoje Jovčić, Anne Panther, Kristaps Konstantinovs

13 March 2024	U-BT Cluj-Napoca (Romanian Basketball Federation)	79–91	(British Basketball) London Lions	Cluj-Napoca, Romania
18:00 (19:00 EET)	Scoring by quarter: 18–29, 19–22, 23–23, 19–17
	Pts: Jones 23; Rebs: Eddie 5 Asts: Cățe, Jones 5 PIR: Jones 23	Boxscore	Pts: Dekker 21; Rebs: Nwaba 8 Asts: Grantham 4 PIR: Dekker 23	Arena: BTarena; Attendance: 10,000; Referees: Borys Ryzhyk, Jakub Zamojski, Alberto Baena

13 March 2024	Hapoel Shlomo Tel Aviv (Israeli Basketball Association)	89–94	(Turkish Basketball Federation) Beşiktaş Emlakjet	Vilnius, Lithuania
18:30 (19:30 EET)	Scoring by quarter: 25–15, 32–24, 19–29, 13–26
	Pts: Cummings 28; Rebs: Hoard 9 Asts: Timor 5 PIR: Cummings 32	Boxscore	Pts: Mathews 28; Rebs: Delgado 12; Asts: Mathews, Needham 5 PIR: Mathews 26	Arena: Avia Solutions Group Arena; Attendance: 820; Referees: Emilio Pérez, Joseph Bissang, Vasiliki Tsaroucha

14 March 2024	Paris Basketball (French Federation of Basketball)	86–70	(Spanish Basketball Federation) Joventut Badalona	Paris, France
20:45	Scoring by quarter: 24–17, 16–18, 22–13, 24–22
	Pts: Shorts 21; Rebs: Jantunen 6 Asts: Shorts 9 PIR: Shorts 28	Boxscore	Pts: Andrews 25; Rebs: Tomić 8 Asts: Feliz 6 PIR: Andrews 24	Arena: Adidas Arena; Attendance: 3,880; Referees: Tomislav Hordov, Sérgio Silva, Guido Giovannetti

== Semifinals ==
=== Summary ===
The first legs were played on 26 March, the second legs on 29 March and the third legs on 3 April 2024, if necessary.

Team 1	Series	Team 2	1st leg	2nd leg	3rd leg
Paris Basketball (French Federation of Basketball)	2–0	(British Basketball) London Lions	99–86	93–85	—
Mincidelice JL Bourg (French Federation of Basketball)	2–1	(Turkish Basketball Federation) Beşiktaş Emlakjet	86–74	71–82	89–63

=== First leg ===
26 March 2024	Mincidelice JL Bourg (French Federation of Basketball)	86–74 (Series: 1–0)	(Turkish Basketball Federation) Beşiktaş Emlakjet	Bourg-en-Bresse, France
19:00	Scoring by quarter: 16–13, 28–17, 18–26, 24–18
	Pts: Mike 16; Rebs: Mike 6 Asts: Lewis 5 PIR: Mike 24	Boxscore	Pts: Delgado 15; Rebs: Delgado 16; Asts: Mathews, Needham 5 PIR: Delgado 30	Arena: Ekinox; Attendance: 3,476; Referees: Borys Ryzhyk, Michele Rossi, Josip Radojković

26 March 2024	Paris Basketball (French Federation of Basketball)	99–86 (Series: 1–0)	(British Basketball) London Lions	Paris, France
20:45	Scoring by quarter: 30–27, 24–22, 25–8, 20–29
	Pts: Shorts 23; Rebs: Jantunen 9 Asts: Shorts 7 PIR: Shorts 33	Boxscore	Pts: Nwaba 24; Rebs: Nwaba, Olaseni 5 Asts: Phillip 8 PIR: Nwaba 34	Arena: Adidas Arena; Attendance: 5,103; Referees: Carmelo Paternicò, Miloš Koljenšić, Nick van den Broeck

=== Second leg ===
29 March 2024	Beşiktaş Emlakjet (Turkish Basketball Federation)	82–71 (Series: 1–1)	(French Federation of Basketball) Mincidelice JL Bourg	Istanbul, Turkey
18:45 (20:45 TRT)	Scoring by quarter: 19–18, 13–18, 27–17, 23–18
	Pts: Mathews, Mitchell 17; Rebs: Mitchell, Simonović 6 Asts: Mathews, Needham 4 PIR: Simonović 24	Boxscore	Pts: Mike 19; Rebs: Mike 8 Asts: Julien 4 PIR: Mike 19	Arena: Sinan Erdem Dome; Attendance: 15,644; Referees: Robert Lottermoser, Robert Vyklický, Tomasz Trawicki

29 March 2024	London Lions (British Basketball)	85–93 (Series: 0–2)	(French Federation of Basketball) Paris Basketball	London, United Kingdom
20:30 (19:30 WET)	Scoring by quarter: 19–21, 26–18, 19–27, 21–27
	Pts: Morgan 25; Rebs: Nwaba 9 Asts: Nwaba 4 PIR: Morgan 23	Boxscore	Pts: Shorts 21; Rebs: Kratzer 7 Asts: Ngouama, Shorts 5 PIR: Shorts 24	Arena: The CopperBox Arena; Attendance: 5,945; Referees: Saša Pukl, Marcin Kowalski, Luka Kardum

=== Third leg ===
3 April 2024	Mincidelice JL Bourg (French Federation of Basketball)	89–63 (Series: 2–1)	(Turkish Basketball Federation) Beşiktaş Emlakjet	Bourg-en-Bresse, France
19:30	Scoring by quarter: 23–21, 21–20, 21–18, 24–4
	Pts: Salash 19; Rebs: Julien 6 Asts: Lewis 4 PIR: Salash 19	Boxscore	Pts: Needham 18; Rebs: Arslan, Konan 6 Asts: Needham 4 PIR: Delgado 11	Arena: Ekinox; Attendance: 3,540; Referees: Miguel Ángel Pérez, Milan Nedović, Eduard Udyanskyy

== Finals ==
=== Summary ===
The first legs were played on 9 April, the second legs on 12 April and the third legs on 15 April 2024, if necessary.

Team 1	Series	Team 2	1st leg	2nd leg	3rd leg
Paris Basketball (French Federation of Basketball)	2–0	(French Federation of Basketball) Mincidelice JL Bourg	77–64	89–81	—

=== First leg ===
9 April 2024	Paris Basketball (French Federation of Basketball)	77–64 (Series: 1–0)	(French Federation of Basketball) Mincidelice JL Bourg	Paris, France
20:30	Scoring by quarter: 23–11, 31–20, 11–12, 12–21
	Pts: Shorts 15; Rebs: Kessens 7 Asts: Shorts 4 PIR: Shorts 20	Boxscore	Pts: Risacher 11; Rebs: Brown, Massa 5 Asts: Benitez 4 PIR: Risacher 10	Arena: Adidas Arena; Attendance: 7,998; Referees: Damir Javor, Jordi Aliaga, Sérgio Silva

=== Second leg ===
12 April 2024	Mincidelice JL Bourg (French Federation of Basketball)	81–89 (Series: 0–2)	(French Federation of Basketball) Paris Basketball	Bourg-en-Bresse, France
19:30	Scoring by quarter: 26–22, 20–21, 17–21, 18–25
	Pts: Mike 16; Rebs: Mike 6 Asts: Lewis 8 PIR: Benitez 17	Boxscore	Pts: Shorts 22; Rebs: Kratzer, Shorts 6 Asts: Shorts 5 PIR: Shorts 28	Arena: Ekinox; Attendance: 3,574; Referees: Borys Ryzhyk, Carlos Cortés, Kristaps Konstantinovs

== See also ==
- 2024 EuroLeague Playoffs
- 2023–24 EuroCup Basketball
