= 2022 NBA G League draft =

General information
- Sport: Basketball
- Date: October 22, 2022

Overview
- League: NBA
- First selection: Sam Merrill, Cleveland Charge

The 2022 NBA G League draft was the 22nd draft of the NBA G League. It was held on October 22, 2022. Sam Merrill was selected by the Cleveland Charge as the first overall pick.

== Key ==
Pos.	G	F	C
Position	Guard	Forward	Center

†	Denotes player who was also selected in an NBA Draft

== Draft ==
=== First round ===
Pick	Player	Pos.	Nationality	Team	College/country
1	Sam Merrill^{†}	G	United States	Cleveland Charge	Utah State
2	Joe Wieskamp^{†}	G	United States	Wisconsin Herd	Iowa
3	Aaron Wheeler	F	United States	Greensboro Swarm	St. John's
4	Jared Rhoden	G	United States	College Park Skyhawks	Seton Hall
5	Jericole Hellems	F	United States	Oklahoma City Blue	NC State
6	Kadeem Jack	C	Trinidad and Tobago; United States	Sioux Falls Skyforce	Rutgers
7	Terrell Brown Jr.	G	United States	College Park Skyhawks	Washington
8	Michael Weathers	G	United States	Oklahoma City Blue	SMU
9	Tazé Moore	G	United States	Texas Legends	Houston
10	Amauri Hardy	G	United States	Texas Legends	Oregon
11	Ty Gordon	G	United States	Memphis Hustle	Nicholls
12	Mamoudou Diarra	F	Mali	Iowa Wolves	Tennessee Tech
13	Abu Kigab	F	Canada	Fort Wayne Mad Ants	Boise State
14	Warith Alatishe	F	Nigeria; United States	Ontario Clippers	Oregon State
15	Mayan Kiir	F	South Sudan; United States	Westchester Knicks	New Mexico State
16	Theo John	C	United States	Capital City Go-Go	Duke
17	Nate Roberts	C	United States	South Bay Lakers	Washington
18	Keith Williams	G	United States	Memphis Hustle	Cincinnati
19	Taz Sherman	G	United States	Long Island Nets	West Virginia
20	Devon Daniels	G	United States	Raptors 905	NC State
21	Jai Smith	F	United States	Sioux Falls Skyforce	Overtime Elite
22	Adrian Delph	G	United States	College Park Skyhawks	Appalachian State
23	Tyrn Flowers	F	United States	Wisconsin Herd	LIU
24	Nick King	F	United States	Windy City Bulls	Middle Tennessee
25	David Collins	G	United States	Ontario Clippers	Clemson
26	Derek Culver	C	United States	Delaware Blue Coats	West Virginia
27	Ryan Turell	F	United States	Motor City Cruise	Yeshiva
28	Tom Digbeu	G	France	Motor City Cruise	Australia
29	Kendall Smith	G	United States	Maine Celtics	Oklahoma State

=== Second round ===
Pick	Player	Pos.	Nationality	Team	College/country
1	Rashad Vaughn^{†}	G	United States	Cleveland Charge	UNLV
2	Jassel Pérez	G	Dominican Republic	Capitanes de la Ciudad de México	Dominican Republic
3	Tyson Jolly	G	United States	Greensboro Swarm	Iona
4	Hasahn French	F	United States	Raptors 905	Saint Louis
5	–	–	–	Greensboro Swarm	–
6	Landon Kirkwood	G	United States	Sioux Falls Skyforce	Barry
7	Justin Kier	G	United States	Austin Spurs	Arizona
8	–	–	–	Iowa Wolves	–
9	Jayce Johnson	C	United States	Santa Cruz Warriors	Marquette
10	–	–	–	Delaware Blue Coats	–
11	Remy Martin	G	United States; Philippines	Cleveland Charge	Kansas
12	Noah Starkey	C	United States	Oklahoma City Blue	Southern Nazarene
13	Philip Flory	G	United States	Oklahoma City Blue	Wisconsin–Stevens Point
14	Zak Irvin	G	United States	Maine Celtics	Michigan
15	Jahvon Blair	G	Canada	Westchester Knicks	Georgetown
16	Brandon McCoy	C	United States	Sioux Falls Skyforce	UNLV
17	John Meeks	G	United States	South Bay Lakers	College of Charleston
18	Seth Allen	G	United States	Stockton Kings	Virginia Tech
19	Norris Cole^{†}	G	United States	Grand Rapids Gold	Cleveland State
20	–	–	–	Memphis Hustle	–
21	Austin Trice	F	United States	Stockton Kings	Old Dominion
22	–	–	–	College Park Skyhawks	–
23	–	–	–	Greensboro Swarm	–
24	Isaac Johnson	F	United States	Stockton Kings	Appalachian State
25	Elijah Lufile	F	Canada	Salt Lake City Stars	Oral Roberts
26	–	–	–	Delaware Blue Coats	–
27	Eron Gordon	G	United States	Rio Grande Valley Vipers	Valparaiso
28	Jack Nolan	G	United States	Santa Cruz Warriors	Washington–St. Louis
29	Armon Fletcher	G	United States	Salt Lake City Stars	Southern Illinois

=== Third round ===
Pick	Player	Pos.	Nationality	Team	College/country
1	JJ Moore	F	United States	Cleveland Charge	Rutgers
2	–	–	–	College Park Skyhawks	–
3	–	–	–	Greensboro Swarm	–
4	Jachai Taylor	F	United States	Lakeland Magic	Queens (NC)
5	–	–	–	Lakeland Magic	–
6	Trey McGowens	G	United States	Birmingham Squadron	Nebraska
7	–	–	–	Austin Spurs	–
8	Kevin Kangu	G	Canada	Oklahoma City Blue	Lenoir–Rhyne
9	Wayne Stewart Jr.	G	United States	Windy City Bulls	Texas A&M–Commerce
10	–	–	–	Fort Wayne Mad Ants	–
11	–	–	–	Maine Celtics	–
12	–	–	–	Cleveland Charge	–
13	–	–	–	Fort Wayne Mad Ants	–
14	–	–	–	Maine Celtics	–
15	Dazon Ingram	G	United States	Westchester Knicks	UCF
16	–	–	–	Grand Rapids Gold	–
17	–	–	–	Capitanes de la Ciudad de México	–
18	–	–	–	Windy City Bulls	–
19	Alan Griffin	G	United States	Long Island Nets	Syracuse
20	–	–	–	Austin Spurs	–
21	–	–	–	Austin Spurs	–
22	–	–	–	College Park Skyhawks	–
23	–	–	–	Wisconsin Herd	–
24	–	–	–	Grand Rapids Gold	–
25	–	–	–	Ontario Clippers	–
26	–	–	–	Delaware Blue Coats	–
27	–	–	–	Santa Cruz Warriors	–
28	Nick Hornsby	F	United States	Capital City Go-Go	Sacramento State
29	–	–	–	Raptors 905	–
