= 2024 EuroCup Finals =

Final series of the 2023–24 edition of the EuroCup Basketball

- Event: 2023–24 EuroCup Basketball
Paris Basketball	Mincidelice JL Bourg
(French Federation of Basketball)	(French Federation of Basketball)
2	0

First leg
Paris Basketball	Mincidelice JL Bourg
77	64
- Date: 9 April 2024
- Venue: Adidas Arena, Paris, France
- MVP: (North Macedonia) T. J. Shorts (Paris)
- Attendance: 7,998

Second leg
Mincidelice JL Bourg	Paris Basketball
81	89
- Date: 12 April 2024
- Venue: Ekinox, Bourg-en-Bresse, France
- Attendance: 3,574

The 2024 EuroCup Finals were the concluding games of the 2023–24 EuroCup season, the 22nd season of Euroleague Basketball's secondary level professional club basketball tournament, the 16th season since it was renamed from the ULEB Cup to the EuroCup, and the first season under the new title sponsorship name of BKT. The first leg was played at the Adidas Arena in Paris, France, on 9 April 2024, the second leg was played at the Ekinox in Bourg-en-Bresse, France, on 12 April 2024 between French sides Paris Basketball and Mincidelice JL Bourg.

Paris Basketball swept Mincidelice JL Bourg to achieve its first continental crown by winning its first EuroCup title and earned the right to play in the 2024–25 EuroLeague. It was also the second French side to win the EuroCup after AS Monaco triumph in the 2020–21 season.

== Background ==
It was the first all–French final series in the history of the EuroCup and the second all–French final series in the history of the European club basketball tournaments after the 2017 FIBA Europe Cup Finals in which Nanterre 92 defeated Élan Chalon for achieve their second continental crown.

It was the first ever Finals appearance in the competition for Paris Basketball. It was also the first time that any team from the French capital play a European final. Until this season, the best Parisian performance was the 1996–97 season of the European second–tier level FIBA EuroCup semifinal played by Paris Basket Racing in which it was defeated by Real Madrid that finally won the title.

It was the first ever Finals appearance for Mincidelice JL Bourg in EuroCup. It was also the first time that JL Bourg play a European final and became the 14th French team to qualify for a European final.

== Venues ==
The Adidas Arena hosted the first leg as Paris Basketball home venue. The arena was recently inaugurated in February 2024 and have a capacity of 8,000 seats for sporting events and 9,000 seats for concerts and shows, as well as two gymnasiums intended for use by local clubs and residents. It was originally intended to host the wrestling events and men's preliminary basketball tournament of the 2024 Summer Olympics, before hosting the Paralympic table tennis tournament. Finally, the Olympic events of badminton then rhythmic gymnastics take place there, followed by Para badminton and powerlifting. As soon as the arena is built, it became the residence of Paris Basketball, as well as PSG Handball for its larger games.

The Ekinox hosted the second leg as Mincidelice JL Bourg home venue. The arena usually hosts the home games of JL Bourg since January 2014 and have a capacity of 3,548 seats for sporting events and 5,141 seats for concerts and shows.

Paris	2024 EuroCup Finals (Europe)	Bourg-en-Bresse
Adidas Arena	2024 EuroCup Finals (Europe)	Ekinox
Capacity: 8,000	2024 EuroCup Finals (Europe)	Capacity: 3,548

== Road to the Finals ==
Note: In the table, the score of the finalist is given first (H = home; A = away).

=== Paris Basketball ===
Round	Results				
Regular season	Group A: Pos / Team / Pld / W / L / Qualification; 1 / (French Federation of Basketball) Paris Basketball / 18 / 17 / 1 / Advance to quarterfinals; 2 / (Israeli Basketball Association) Hapoel Shlomo Tel Aviv / 18 / 13 / 5 / Advance to quarterfinals; 3 / (British Basketball) London Lions / 18 / 12 / 6 / Advance to eighthfinals; 4 / (Basketball Federation of Ukraine) Prometey / 18 / 10 / 8 / Advance to eighthfinals; 5 / (Spanish Basketball Federation) Joventut Badalona / 18 / 10 / 8 / Advance to eighthfinals; 6 / (Turkish Basketball Federation) Beşiktaş Emlakjet / 18 / 9 / 9 / Advance to eighthfinals; 7 / (Lithuanian Basketball Federation) Wolves / 18 / 8 / 10; 8 / (Italian Basketball Federation) Umana Reyer Venezia / 18 / 8 / 10; 9 / (German Basketball Federation) Veolia Towers Hamburg / 18 / 2 / 16; 10 / (Basketball Federation of Slovenia) Cedevita Olimpija / 18 / 1 / 17; Source: EuroCup; Rules for classification: All points scored in extra period(s) were not counted in the standings, nor for any tie-break situation.				
Playoffs	Opponent	Series	1st leg	2nd leg	3rd leg
Quarterfinals	(Spanish Basketball Federation) Joventut Badalona	1–0	86–70 (H)	—N/a	
Semifinals	(British Basketball) London Lions	2–0	99–86 (H)	93–85 (A)	—N/a

=== Mincidelice JL Bourg ===
Round	Results				
Regular season	Group B: Pos / Team / Pld / W / L / Qualification; 1 / (French Federation of Basketball) Mincidelice JL Bourg / 18 / 14 / 4 / Advance to quarterfinals; 2 / (Romanian Basketball Federation) U-BT Cluj-Napoca / 18 / 13 / 5 / Advance to quarterfinals; 3 / (Spanish Basketball Federation) Dreamland Gran Canaria / 18 / 12 / 6 / Advance to eighthfinals; 4 / (German Basketball Federation) ratiopharm Ulm / 18 / 10 / 8 / Advance to eighthfinals; 5 / (Hellenic Basketball Federation) Aris Midea / 18 / 9 / 9 / Advance to eighthfinals; 6 / (Turkish Basketball Federation) Türk Telekom / 18 / 8 / 10 / Advance to eighthfinals; 7 / (Basketball Federation of Montenegro) Budućnost VOLI / 18 / 8 / 10; 8 / (Italian Basketball Federation) Dolomiti Energia Trento / 18 / 7 / 11; 9 / (Lithuanian Basketball Federation) 7bet-Lietkabelis / 18 / 7 / 11; 10 / (Polish Basketball Federation) Śląsk Wrocław / 18 / 2 / 16; Source: EuroCup; Rules for classification: All points scored in extra period(s) were not counted in the standings, nor for any tie-break situation.				
Playoffs	Opponent	Series	1st leg	2nd leg	3rd leg
Quarterfinals	(Basketball Federation of Ukraine) Prometey	1–0	95–82 (H)	—N/a	
Semifinals	(Turkish Basketball Federation) Beşiktaş Emlakjet	2–1	86–74 (H)	71–82 (A)	89–63 (H)

== First leg ==
9 April 2024	Paris Basketball (French Federation of Basketball)	77–64 (Series: 1–0)	(French Federation of Basketball) Mincidelice JL Bourg	Paris, France
20:30	Scoring by quarter: 23–11, 31–20, 11–12, 12–21
	Pts: Shorts 15; Rebs: Kessens 7 Asts: Shorts 4 PIR: Shorts 20	Boxscore	Pts: Risacher 11; Rebs: Brown, Massa 5 Asts: Benitez 4 PIR: Risacher 10	Arena: Adidas Arena; Attendance: 7,998; Referees: Damir Javor, Jordi Aliaga, Sérgio Silva

== Second leg ==
12 April 2024	Mincidelice JL Bourg (French Federation of Basketball)	81–89 (Series: 0–2)	(French Federation of Basketball) Paris Basketball	Bourg-en-Bresse, France
19:30	Scoring by quarter: 26–22, 20–21, 17–21, 18–25
	Pts: Mike 16; Rebs: Mike 6 Asts: Lewis 8 PIR: Benitez 17	Boxscore	Pts: Shorts 22; Rebs: Kratzer, Shorts 6 Asts: Shorts 5 PIR: Shorts 28	Arena: Ekinox; Attendance: 3,574; Referees: Borys Ryzhyk, Carlos Cortés, Kristaps Konstantinovs

2023–24 EuroCup champions

Paris Basketball
(1st title)

== See also ==
- 2024 EuroLeague Final Four
- 2024 Basketball Champions League Final Four
