= Central Christian School =

Central Christian School may refer to:

- Central Christian College of Kansas, evangelical Christian college in McPherson, Kansas, affiliated with the Free Methodist Church
- Central Christian College of the Bible, former name of Central Bible University, located in Moberly, Missouri
- Central Christian High School (Kidron, Ohio), a Mennonite K-12 school in Ohio
- Central Christian School (Hutchinson, Kansas)
- Central Christian Schools, Redmond, Oregon
