= Olek Balcerowski =

Polish basketball player (born 2000)

- Balcerowski with FC Barcelona in 2026

No. 22 – FC Barcelona
- Position: Center
- League: Liga ACB; EuroLeague

Personal information
- Born: 19 November 2000 (age 25) Świdnica, Poland
- Listed height: 2.16 m (7 ft 1 in)
- Listed weight: 123 kg (271 lb)

Career information
- NBA draft: 2022: undrafted
- Playing career: 2017–present

Career history
- 2017–2023: Gran Canaria
- 2021–2022: →Mega Basket
- 2023–2024: Panathinaikos
- 2024–2026: Unicaja Málaga
- 2026–present: FC Barcelona

Career highlights
- EuroLeague champion (2024); EuroCup champion (2023); 2× EuroCup Rising Star (2021, 2023); FIBA Champions League champion (2025); 2× FIBA Intercontinental Cup champion (2024, 2025); Greek League champion (2024); Spanish Cup winner (2025); Spanish Supercup winner (2024)

Aleksander Roman "Olek" Balcerowski (born 19 November 2000) is a Polish professional basketball player for FC Barcelona of the Liga ACB and the EuroLeague. He also represents the senior Poland national team in international competition.

== Professional career ==
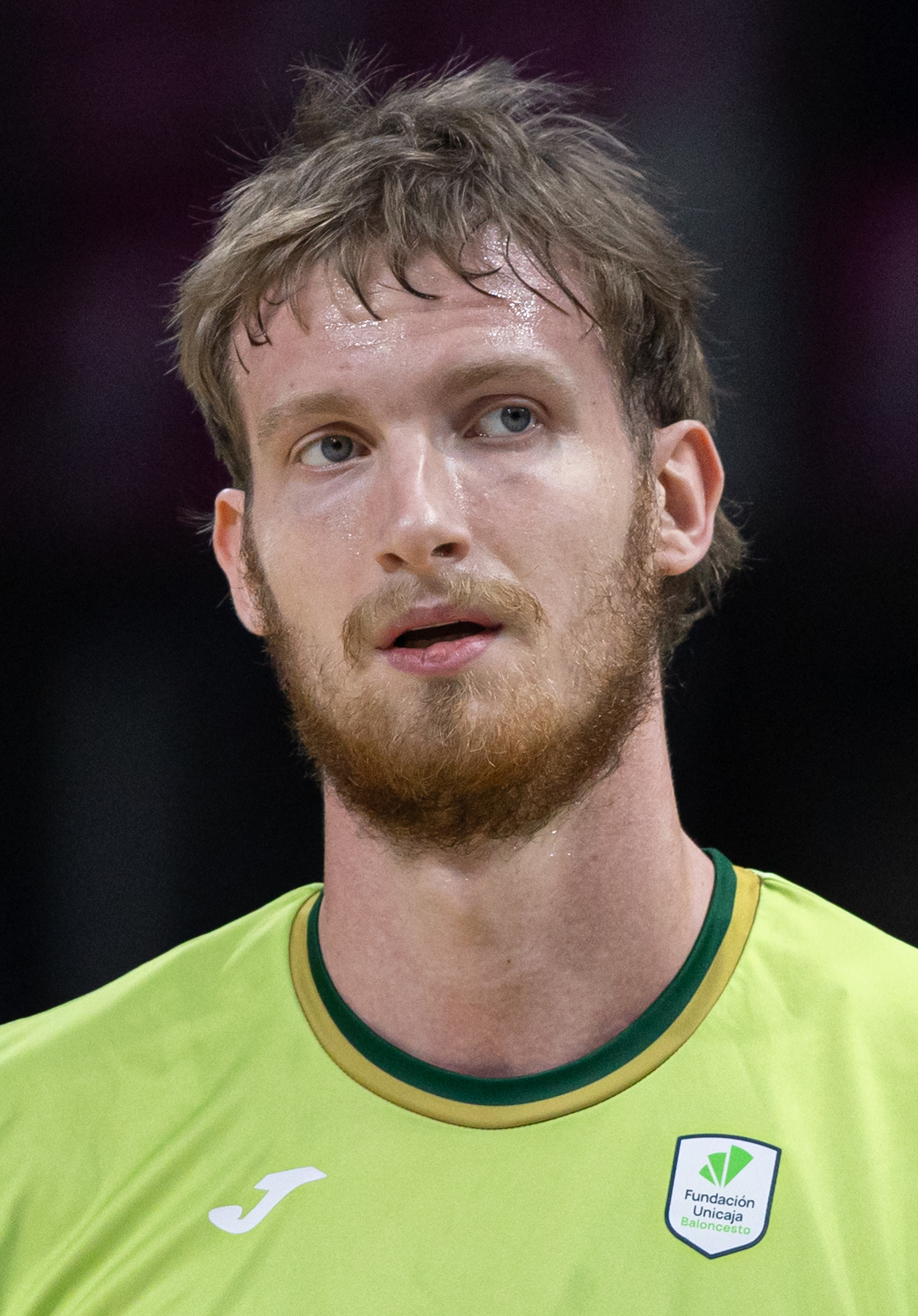

Balcerowski started his career in Górnik Wałbrzych, Poland. In 2014, he joined Herbalife Gran Canaria at the age of 14 and entered their youth system. Less than three years later, he became the second youngest player to be on Herbalife Gran Canaria men's team, as he made his first team debut at just 17 years and 14 days old. Having participated in the EuroLeague Basketball Adidas Next Generation Tournament Ciutat de L'Hospitalet twice, Balcerowski made his debut in the EuroCup, playing against Tofaş S.K. in December 2017.

At the end of the 2020–21 EuroCup Basketball competition, he was awarded the EuroCup Basketball Rising Star. He made 65.6 percent of his two-point shots, averaging 6.5 points and 3.7 rebounds in 15 EuroCup games.

In 2020, when playing for Gran Canaria he recorded a career-high 10 rebounds in a game against CB Zamora and a career-best 26 points against CB Villarrobledo.

Following the 2020–21 season, he declared for the 2021 NBA draft. In July 2021, he was loaned to Mega Basket of the ABA League for the 2021–22 season. On 19 July 2021, he withdrew his name from consideration for the 2021 NBA draft. He left Mega in February 2022. He went undrafted in the 2022 NBA draft.

In the 2022–23 EuroCup Basketball season Balcerowski won the title with CB Gran Canaria, contributing to the final win against Türk Telekom B.K. with 5 points and a team-high 5 rebounds.

On 28 July 2023, Balcerowski signed a 1+1 two-year contract with EuroLeague powerhouse Panathinaikos.

On 2 September 2024, Balcerowski moved to Spanish club Baloncesto Málaga. On 20 July 2026, he parted ways with the Andalusians after reaching an agreement to terminate his contract.

On 23 July 2026, he signed with FC Barcelona of the Liga ACB and the EuroLeague.

== National team career ==
Balcerowski was a member of the Poland national team that finished eighth at the 2019 FIBA World Cup. He was the youngest player at the tournament. In over eight tournament games, he averaged 2.5 points and 1.9 rebounds per game.

== Personal life ==
His father Marcin played for Górnik Wałbrzych in Poland's second and third-tier leagues before a car accident in 1998 that left him using a wheelchair. He later transitioned to wheelchair basketball and became a member of the Polish national team. In 2021, he was named head coach of the Polish wheelchair basketball national team. From September 2023 he joined the wheelchair basketball team of Panathinaikos as well. His mother Sylwia, originally from Lublin, Poland, also has a background in basketball.

== Career statistics ==
Legend
GP	Games played	GS	Games started	MPG	Minutes per game
FG%	Field-goal percentage	3P%	3-point field-goal percentage	FT%	Free-throw percentage
RPG	Rebounds per game	APG	Assists per game	SPG	Steals per game
BPG	Blocks per game	PPG	Points per game	PIR	Performance index rating
**Bold**	Career high

=== EuroLeague ===
†	Denotes seasons in which Balcerowski won the EuroLeague

Year	Team	GP	GS	MPG	FG%	3P%	FT%	RPG	APG	SPG	BPG	PPG	PIR
2018–19	Gran Canaria	6	2	**12.3**	.438	**.400**	—	**1.7**	**.3**	**.3**	.3	**3.0**	3.0
2023–24†	Panathinaikos	**24**	**9**	7.6	**.523**	.111	**.700**	1.3	**.3**	.2	**.4**	2.8	**3.1**
Career		30	11	8.5	.500	.263	.700	1.4	.3	.3	.4	2.9	3.1

=== EuroCup ===
Year	Team	GP	GS	MPG	FG%	3P%	FT%	RPG	APG	SPG	BPG	PPG	PIR
2017–18	Gran Canaria	2	0	3.0	.500	—	—	1.0	—	.5	.5	1.0	2.0
2020–21	Gran Canaria	15	2	13.7	.603	.143	**.737**	3.7	**.8**	**.5**	.7	6.5	8.3
2021–22	Gran Canaria	7	4	14.9	.561	**.444**	.636	1.9	.6	.3	.3	8.1	6.4
2022–23	Gran Canaria	**22**	**16**	**17.0**	**.649**	.409	.692	**3.8**	**.8**	**.5**	**1.0**	**8.6**	**10.6**
Career		46	22	15.0	.617	.368	.695	3.3	.7	.5	.8	7.5	8.8

=== Domestic leagues ===
Year	Team	League	GP	MPG	FG%	3P%	FT%	RPG	APG	SPG	BPG	PPG
2017–18	(Spain) Gran Canaria	ACB	1	1.5	—	—	—	1.0	—	—	—	0.0
2018–19	(Spain) Gran Canaria	ACB	4	8.9	.500	.571	.500	1.5	.2	.5	—	3.2
2019–20	(Spain) Gran Canaria B	LEB Plata	8	22.4	.551	.250	.459	6.4	1.1	.9	1.0	12.0
2019–20	(Spain) Gran Canaria	ACB	2	6.6	.000	—	.000	1.0	—	—	.5	0.0
2020–21	(Spain) Gran Canaria	ACB	32	11.5	.569	.438	.604	2.3	.4	.2	.6	5.1
2021–22	(Serbia) Mega	ABA	16	19.1	.514	.182	.643	5.5	1.1	.7	1.4	8.6
2021–22	(Spain) Gran Canaria	ACB	15	8.6	.487	.250	.900	1.2	.4	.1	.5	3.3
2022–23	(Spain) Gran Canaria	ACB	36	16.5	.617	.270	.644	3.3	.7	.4	.9	9.4
2023–24	(Greece) Panathinaikos	GBL	26	14.3	.635	.000	.559	3.8	.7	.5	.6	6.1
