= Bodian Massa =

French basketball player (born 1997)

- Massa with ASVEL in 2026

No. 10 – ASVEL
- Position: Center
- League: LNB Élite; EuroLeague

Personal information
- Born: October 21, 1997 (age 29) Marseille, France
- Listed height: 2.10 m (6 ft 11 in)
- Listed weight: 95 kg (209 lb)

Career information
- NBA draft: 2019: undrafted
- Playing career: 2017–present

Career history
- 2017–2022: Fos Provence Basket
- 2018–2019: →Saint-Chamond Basket
- 2022–2023: SIG Strasbourg
- 2023–2024: JL Bourg
- 2024–2025: Bàsquet Manresa
- 2025–present: ASVEL

Bodian Massa (born October 21, 1997) is a French professional basketball player for ASVEL of the French LNB Élite and EuroLeague. Standing at a height of 2.10 m (6 ft 10 1/2 in), Massa plays at the center position.

== Early life and youth career ==
Massa was born in Marseille, but grew up in Paris. Returning to Marseille as a teenager due to his studies, he started playing basketball for local club ES Pennes-Mirabeau. In 2014, he joined the youth ranks of Fos Provence Basket.

== Professional career ==
Massa made his professional debut with Fos Provence Basket in 2017, appearing in 3 games of the 2017–18 Pro B, the second-tier of French Basketball. The next season, he would be loaned to Saint-Chamond Basket, also playing in the Pro B. Massa would continue playing for Fos Provence until 2022, getting his first LNB Élite experience in the 2021–22 season.

In June 2022, Massa signed a three season deal with SIG Strasbourg of the LNB Élite and Basketball Champions League.

In June 2023, Massa signed a two season deal with JL Bourg of the LNB Élite and EuroCup. He would reach the 2024 EuroCup Finals with Bourg.

=== Bàsquet Manresa (2024–2025) ===
On June 21, 2024, Massa was announced as a new Bàsquet Manresa player, signing a one season deal with an option for an additional season. With the Catalans, Massa would play in the Liga ACB and the Basketball Champions League. He led the team in rebounds in the domestic competition, averaging 5.5 rebounds per game.

=== ASVEL (2025–present) ===
On July 3, 2025, ASVEL of the French LNB Élite and the EuroLeague announced Massa as a new player, signing a two-year deal.

== Career statistics ==
Legend
GP	Games played	GS	Games started	MPG	Minutes per game
FG%	Field goal percentage	3P%	3-point field goal percentage	FT%	Free throw percentage
RPG	Rebounds per game	APG	Assists per game	SPG	Steals per game
BPG	Blocks per game	PPG	Points per game	**Bold**	Career high

=== EuroCup ===
Year	Team	GP	GS	MPG	FG%	3P%	FT%	RPG	APG	SPG	BPG	PPG	PIR
2023–24	JL Bourg	15	0	18.0	.563	1.000	.857	4.1	1.1	.8	.2	7.8	8.3
Career		15	0	18.0	.563	1.000	.857	4.1	1.1	.8	.2	7.8	8.3

=== Domestic leagues ===
Year	Team	League	GP	MPG	FG%	3P%	FT%	RPG	APG	SPG	BPG	PPG
2022–23	(France) Strasbourg	LNB	34	24.0	.543	.0	.742	7.1	1.4	.7	.6	7.8
2023–24	(France) JL Bourg	LNB	21	20.3	.567	.0	.721	5.8	1.6	.6	.6	10.4
2024–25	(Spain) Manresa	ACB	28	17.5	.491	–	.617	5.5	1.1	.6	.3	5.4
