= Aaron Wheeler (basketball) =

American basketball player (born 1998)

No. 1 – Hapoel Ironi Eilat
- Position: Small forward / power forward
- League: Israeli Basketball Premier League

Personal information
- Born: September 24, 1998 (age 28) Stamford, Connecticut, U.S.
- Listed height: 6 ft 9 in (2.06 m)
- Listed weight: 205 lb (93 kg)

Career information
- High school: Brewster Academy (Wolfeboro, New Hampshire)
- College: Purdue (2017–2021); St. John's (2021–2022)
- NBA draft: 2022: undrafted
- Playing career: 2022–present

Career history
- 2022: Greensboro Swarm
- 2022–2023: Windy City Bulls
- 2023: Rayos de Hermosillo
- 2023–2024: BK Patrioti Levice
- 2024–2025: Cholet Basket
- 2025–2026: Hapoel HaEmek
- 2026–present: Hapoel Ironi Eilat

Career highlights
- SBL champion (2024); Eurobasket SBL MVP (2024); SBL Finals MVP (2024); Slovak Basketball League champion (2024); Slovak Cup winner (2024); Slovak Basketball League MVP (2024); Slovak Basketball League Playoffs MVP (2024); National Prep Championship MVP (2017)

Aaron Michael Wheeler (born September 24, 1998) is an American professional basketball player for Hapoel Ironi Eilat of the Israeli Basketball Premier League. He played college basketball for the Purdue Boilermakers and the St. John's Red Storm.

== High school career ==
Wheeler attended Brewster Academy in Wolfeboro, New Hampshire. He was considered a three-star recruit and was ranked 174th in his class by 247Sports. Wheeler committed to Purdue on October 17, 2016, turning down offers from Northwestern, Providence, and Temple.

== College career ==
Wheeler redshirted his freshman season. As a redshirt freshman in 2018–19, Wheeler posted averages of 4.7 points and 3.0 rebounds on 36.5% shooting from three-point range. Wheeler made 31 triples, the tenth-highest total by a freshman in Purdue basketball history. As a redshirt sophomore in 2019–20, Wheeler started nine games and averaged 3.6 points and 4.2 rebounds per game. As a redshirt junior in 2020–21, Wheeler started five games and averaged 3.9 points and 4.4 rebounds per game.

Following his redshirt junior season, Wheeler announced that he would be entering the transfer portal after four years at Purdue. On April 1, 2021, Wheeler committed to play his senior season at St. John's. Wheeler entered St. John's with two years of eligibility remaining due to the COVID-shortened 2020 season. In his senior season, Wheeler got off to a slow start, averaging just 4.5 points per game in his first 11 games. The rest of the season, however, Wheeler averaged 13.1 points per game on 39.6% 3-point shooting, finishing the season with career-high averages of 10.0 points, 4.7 rebounds, 1.5 assists, and 1.0 blocks in a career-high 22.0 minutes per game. Following his double-redshirt junior campaign, Wheeler declared for the 2022 NBA draft, forgoing his final year of collegiate eligibility.

== Professional career ==
=== Greensboro Swarm (2022) ===
After going undrafted in the 2022 NBA draft, Wheeler signed a summer league contract with the Miami Heat. After the 2022 NBA Summer League, Wheeler failed to make an NBA roster. On October 22, 2022, Wheeler was drafted with the third overall pick in the 2022 NBA G League draft. On December 14, 2022, Wheeler was waived. In 11 games he averaged 3.7 points, 3.5 rebounds, 0.6 assists, 0.5 steals, 1.0 blocks, and 19.6 minutes per game.

=== Windy City Bulls (2022–2023) ===
On December 23, 2022, Wheeler signed a contract to join the Windy City Bulls. In 29 games he averaged 7.8 points, 3.5 rebounds, 0.8 assists, 0.6 steals, 0.8 blocks, and 20.7 minutes per game.

=== Rayos de Hermosillo (2023) ===
On April 25, 2023, Wheeler signed with the Rayos de Hermosillo of the Circuito de Baloncesto de la Costa del Pacífico in Mexico. Hermosillo ended the season as runners-up, losing to Astros de Jalisco in the CIBACOPA finals. In 29 games he averaged 13.7 points, 6.9 rebounds, 2.2 assists, 0.8 steals, 1.2 blocks (4th in the league), and 34.0 minutes per game, while shooting 47.8% from the floor.

=== BK Patrioti Levice (2023–2024) ===
On September 1, 2023, Wheeler signed with BK Patrioti Levice of the Slovak Basketball League (SBL). In his only season with Levice, they won both the SBL Championship and the Slovak Basketball Cup. At the conclusion of the season, Wheeler was awarded SBL MVP, SBL Finals MVP, and SBL Import Player of the Year. In 50 games he averaged 16.1 points, 7.8 rebounds, 2.4 assists, 1.2 steals, 1.7 blocks, and 29.7 minutes per game, while shooting 47.8% from the floor.

=== Cholet Basket (2024–2025) ===
On June 10, 2024, Wheeler signed with Cholet Basket of LNB Pro A in France. In 41 games he averaged 7.4 points, 3.7 rebounds, 1.0 assists, and 19.0 minutes per game, while shooting 50.7% from the floor.

=== Hapoel HaEmek (2025–2026) ===
Playing in 2025-26 for Hapoel HaEmek in the Israeli Basketball Premier League, in 18 games he averaged 7.3 points, 5.0 rebounds, 1.1 assists, 1.2 steals, 1.4 blocks, and 19.0 minutes per game.

=== Hapoel Ironi Eilat (2026–present) ===
In 2026-27 he is playing for Hapoel Ironi Eilat in the Israeli Basketball Premier League .

== Personal life ==
Wheeler is the son of Michelle and William Wheeler Jr. His father was a college basketball standout at Manhattan, scoring 1,278 points in just two years and subsequently being named to the Manhattan College Hall of Fame. His brother, Brandon Wheeler, played college basketball at Bentley University. His uncle, Ken Wheeler, played college basketball at Yale.
