= EuroCup Basketball Rising Star =

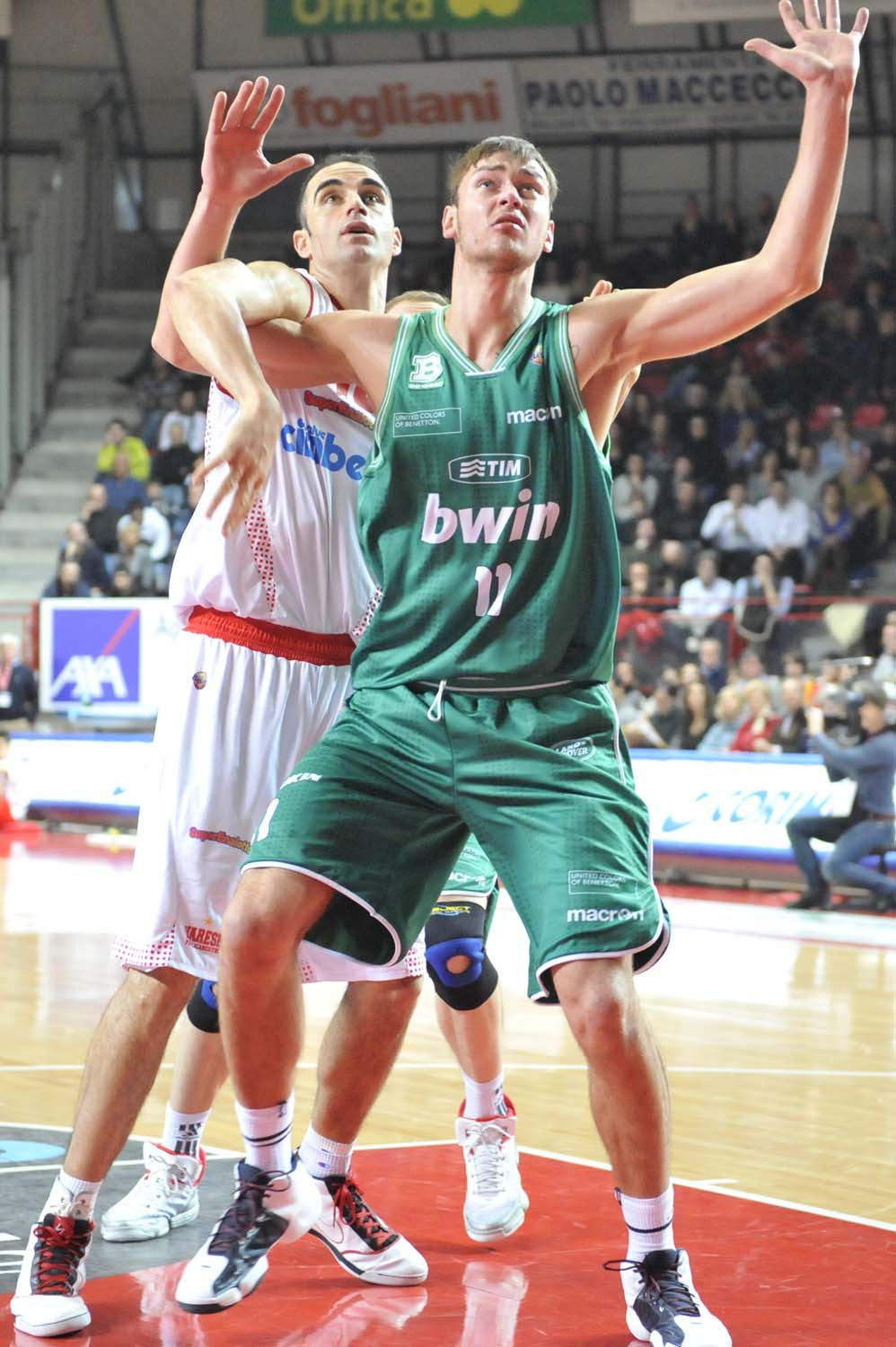
Donatas Motiejūnas (in green), was the EuroCup Rising Star in 2011.

The EuroCup Basketball Rising Star is an annual award of EuroCup Basketball, which is the secondary level European-wide professional club basketball league, that is given to the player that EuroCup Basketball deems its "top rising star". The EuroCup Basketball League is the European-wide professional basketball league that is one tier level below the top-tier EuroLeague. The award began in the EuroCup Basketball 2008–09 season.

Only players who were younger than age 22, on July 1 of the summer before the season started, are eligible for the award.

== Winners ==
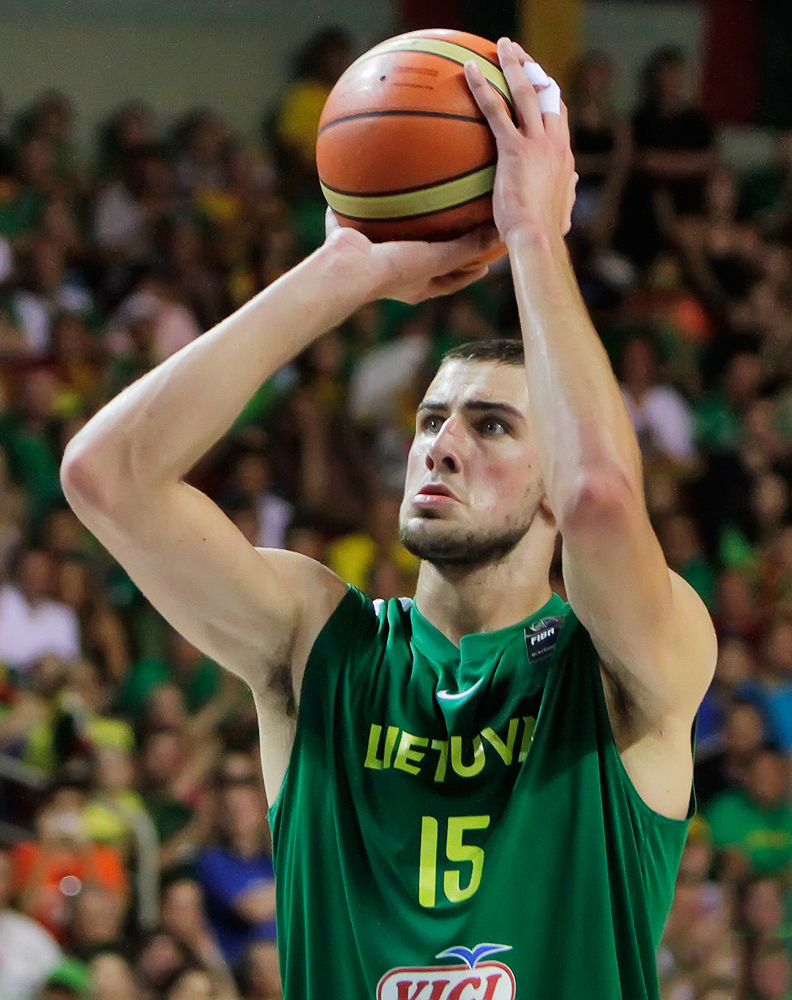
Jonas Valančiūnas was the EuroCup Rising Star in 2012.

Player (X)	Denotes the number of times the player was named Rising Star.

Season	Rising Star	Team	Ref.
2008–09	(Serbia) Milan Mačvan	(Serbia) Hemofarm	
2009–10	(Spain) Víctor Claver	(Spain) Valencia	
2010–11	(Lithuania) Donatas Motiejūnas	(Italy) Treviso	
2011–12	(Lithuania) Jonas Valančiūnas	(Lithuania) Lietuvos Rytas	
2012–13	(Montenegro) Bojan Dubljević	(Spain) Valencia	
2013–14	(Montenegro) Bojan Dubljević (2)	(Spain) Valencia	
2014–15	(Latvia) Kristaps Porziņģis	(Spain) Sevilla	
2015–16	(Poland) Mateusz Ponitka	(Poland) Zielona Góra	
2016–17	(Latvia) Rolands Šmits	(Spain) Montakit Fuenlabrada	
2017–18	(Bosnia and Herzegovina) Džanan Musa	(Croatia) Cedevita	
2018–19	(Lithuania) Martynas Echodas	(Lithuania) Rytas	
2019–20	Not awarded ^{1}		
2020–21	(Poland) Aleksander Balcerowski	(Spain) Herbalife Gran Canaria	
2021–22	(Senegal) Khalifa Diop	(Spain) Herbalife Gran Canaria	
2022–23	(Poland) Aleksander Balcerowski (2)	(Spain) Herbalife Gran Canaria	
2023–24	(France) Zaccharie Risacher	(French Federation of Basketball) JL Bourg	
2024–25	(Dominican Republic) Jean Montero	(Spanish Basketball Federation) Valencia Basket	
2025–26	(Denmark) Tobias Jensen	(German Basketball Federation) ratiopharm Ulm	

^1 There was no awarding in the 2019–20, because the season was cancelled due to the coronavirus pandemic in Europe.

== See also ==
- EuroLeague Rising Star
