= Taz Sherman =

American basketball player (born 1999)

No. 12 – Soproni KC
- Position: Shooting guard
- League: Nemzeti Bajnokság I/A

Personal information
- Born: July 19, 1999 (age 27)
- Listed height: 6 ft 4 in (1.93 m)
- Listed weight: 190 lb (86 kg)

Career information
- High school: Thurgood Marshall (Missouri City, Texas)
- College: Collin College (2017–2019); West Virginia (2019–2022)
- NBA draft: 2022: undrafted
- Playing career: 2022–present

Career history
- 2022–2023: Budapest Honvéd
- 2023–2024: Kobrat
- 2024–2025: Lavrio
- 2025: Reales de La Vega
- 2025–present: Soproni KC

Career highlights
- Second-team All-Big 12 (2022); Second-team NJCAA DI All-American (2019); NTJCAC Player of the Year (2019); 2× First-team All-NTJCAC (2018, 2019); NTJCAC Freshman of the Year (2018)

Tajzmel Sherman (born July 19, 1999) is an American professional basketball player for Soproni KC of the Nemzeti Bajnokság I/A. He played college basketball for the Collin Cougars, and later for the West Virginia Mountaineers.

== High school career ==
Sherman played basketball for Thurgood Marshall High School in Missouri City, Texas. As a senior, he helped his team reach the Class 5A state title game. Despite meeting academic requirements, he received no scholarship offers from NCAA programs, even those in the Division II and Division III. He signed with Collin College, one of two junior colleges to offer him.

== College career ==
As a freshman at Collin College, Sherman averaged 15.2 points per game, earning First Team All-North Texas Junior College Athletic Conference (NTJCAC) and Freshman of the Year honors. In his sophomore season, he scored a career-high 47 points against Grayson College. As a sophomore, Sherman averaged 25.9 points, 4.8 assists and 4.8 rebounds per game. He was named a Second Team NJCAA Division I All-American and NTJCAC Player of the Year.

For his junior season, Sherman transferred to West Virginia over offers from SMU, Utah and Texas Tech. He averaged 5.3 points in 13.1 minutes per game as a junior. On March 2, 2021, Sherman scored a senior season-high 26 points in a 94–89 overtime loss to Baylor. He posted 21 games in double figures scoring during the season, starting six games. As a senior, he finished third on the team in scoring with 13.4 points per game, and helped West Virginia reach the second round of the NCAA Tournament. Sherman earned All-Big 12 honorable mention recognition. He declared for the 2021 NBA draft before returning to West Virginia for a fifth season of eligibility, granted due to the COVID-19 pandemic. On November 18, 2021, Sherman scored 27 points in an 87-68 victory over Elon. He was named to the Second Team All-Big 12.

== Professional career ==
Sherman went undrafted in the 2022 NBA draft. On October 22, 2022, he was selected with the 19th pick of the first round in the 2022 NBA G League draft by the Long Island Nets, but he was waived a week later. On October 31, he was acquired by the Birmingham Squadron, but was waived 4 days later. On November 15, was acquired by the Santa Cruz Warriors, but was again waived 5 days later without appearing in a game.

On November 27, 2022, Sherman was signed by Budapesti Honvéd SE in Hungary. He then spent the 2023–2024 season with Kobrat in Finland, before signing with Greek club Lavrio on June 12, 2024.

== Career statistics ==
Legend
GP	Games played	GS	Games started	MPG	Minutes per game
FG%	Field goal percentage	3P%	3-point field goal percentage	FT%	Free throw percentage
RPG	Rebounds per game	APG	Assists per game	SPG	Steals per game
BPG	Blocks per game	PPG	Points per game	**Bold**	Career high

=== College ===
==== NCAA Division I ====
Year	Team	GP	GS	MPG	FG%	3P%	FT%	RPG	APG	SPG	BPG	PPG
2019–20	West Virginia	**31**	4	13.1	.383	.333	.864	.8	.8	.6	**.2**	5.3
2020–21	West Virginia	28	**6**	**24.3**	**.413**	**.359**	**.873**	**1.8**	**1.4**	**.9**	.1	**13.4**
Career		59	10	18.4	.403	.349	.871	1.3	1.1	.7	.2	9.1

==== JUCO ====
Year	Team	GP	GS	MPG	FG%	3P%	FT%	RPG	APG	SPG	BPG	PPG
2017–18	Collin	–	–	–	.471	.388	.807	–	–	–	–	15.2
2018–19	Collin	**29**	**28**	–	**.490**	**.393**	**.875**	**4.8**	**4.8**	**1.6**	**.2**	**25.9**
Career		–	–	–	–	–	–	–	–	–	–	–
