= Central Christian School (Hutchinson, Kansas) =

Location
- 1910 East 30th Avenue; Hutchinson, Kansas 67502; United States
- Coordinates: 38°05′12″N 97°53′17″W

Information
- Other names: Central Christian High School; Central Christian Schools; Central Christian; Central; CCHS; CCS
- Former name: Central Kansas Bible Academy (1950–1955)
- Type: Private Christian elementary and secondary school
- Established: 1950
- Superintendent: Dr. John Walker
- NCES School ID: 00490445
- Principal: Abby Reed
- Teaching staff: 22
- Grades: K-12
- Enrollment: 189
- Student to teacher ratio: 8.6
- Colors: Green, blue, and white
- Mascot: Cougars
- Yearbook: The Open Door
- Website: cougarsccs.com
- Example of footnotes

Central Christian School is a private K-12 Christian school located in Hutchinson, Kansas. It also has a preschool and daycare. The school is often referred to as "Central". The school mascot is the Cougars.

== History ==
The school was established by local Mennonite organizations and opened in 1950 as Central Kansas Bible Academy. The name was changed to Central Christian High School in 1955.

== Academics ==
As of 2026, the high school has an enrollment of 66 individuals, which places its athletic teams in the Kansas State High School Activities Association Class 1A Division II.

As of 2014, Central's annual high school tuition was approximately $5,500. As of 2025-26, there are nearly 200 students enrolled in the entire school.

== Athletics ==
Central Christian has experienced great success in their athletic programs, notably in volleyball and golf. In 2010, Central's high school volleyball team won the KSHSAA 1A DII state championship. Additionally, their high school golf team won the 1A state championship in 2022 and 2025.

== Non-athletic programs ==
Central Christian has also gained success in scholars' bowl. Most notably, their high school scholars' bowl team won the state championship in 2011, 2013, and 2024.

== Notable alumni ==
- Noah Starkey (born 1997, graduated 2015), starting center for the Oklahoma City Blue and 2024 NBA G League champion
