= JeQuan Lewis =

American basketball player (born 1994)

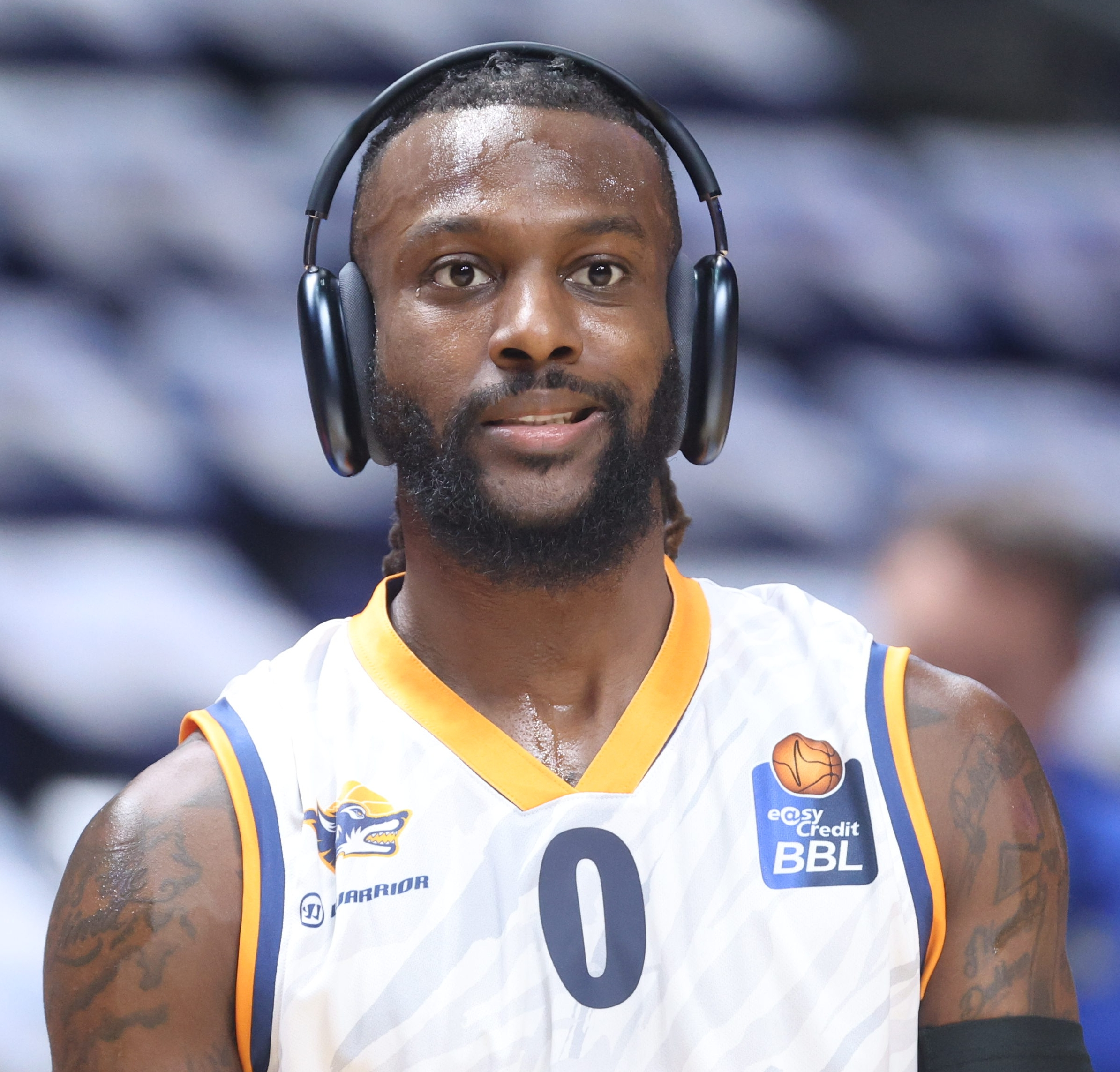
- Lewis with Rostock Seawolves in 2024

No. 3 – Cholet Basket
- Position: Point guard
- League: LNB Élite

Personal information
- Born: September 7, 1994 (age 32) Dickson, Tennessee, U.S.
- Listed height: 6 ft 1 in (1.85 m)
- Listed weight: 180 lb (82 kg)

Career information
- High school: Dickson County (Dickson, Tennessee)
- College: VCU (2013–2017)
- NBA draft: 2017: undrafted
- Playing career: 2017–present

Career history
- 2017–2018: Wisconsin Herd
- 2018: Goyang Orions
- 2018–2019: Kymis
- 2019: Fubon Braves
- 2019–2020: PAOK
- 2020–2021: Ramat HaSharon
- 2021–2022: BC Kalev
- 2022–2023: Rostock Seawolves
- 2023–2024: JL Bourg
- 2024: Qingdao Eagles
- 2024–2025: Rostock Seawolves
- 2025–2026: Igokea
- 2026–present: Cholet Basket

Career highlights
- First-team All-Atlantic 10 (2017)
- Stats at Basketball Reference

JeQuan Demonte Lewis (born September 4, 1994) is an American professional basketball player for Cholet Basket of the French LNB Élite and the Basketball Champions League. He played college basketball for the VCU Rams.

== High school career ==
Lewis attended Davidson Academy as a freshman starting at quarterback as a true freshman for the defending state champions before transferring to Dickson County High School in Tennessee, where he played both basketball and football. His prowess at quarterback led to a scholarship offer from Marshall. However, Lewis was persuaded to stick to basketball and committed to VCU after then-assistant coach Will Wade recruited him.

== College career ==
Lewis came off the bench as a freshman at VCU and averaged 5.9 points and 2.0 assists per game. He was a part-time starter as a sophomore and averaged 8.5 points and 2.7 assists per game. As a junior he started all but two games and averaged 11.3 points and 5.1 assists per game. Coming into his senior season, Lewis was named to the preseason Third Team All-Atlantic 10. Lewis averaged 15.2 points and 4.5 assists per game as a senior, shooting 36.7 percent from beyond the three-point arc. He was named to the First Team All-Atlantic 10. He scored 30 points in his final game, an 85–77 loss to St. Mary's in the NCAA Tournament. He finished his VCU career with 1,444 points and ranks sixth all-time at the school in assists (505), eighth in career made 3-pointers (189) and sixth in made free throws (341).

== Professional career ==
After graduating from VCU, Lewis signed with the Milwaukee Bucks of the NBA Summer League. He was not signed by the Bucks to a regular season contract but was instead assigned to their G League affiliate the Wisconsin Herd. Lewis scored 32 points and added five rebounds, four assists and three steals in a loss to the Long Island Nets on February 11, 2018. In his rookie year, Lewis started 16 of 49 games, averaging 9.2 points, 4.5 assists, 2.3 rebounds and 1.5 steals per game.

On August 9, 2018, Lewis signed with Goyang Orions of the Korean Basketball League. On November 18, Lewis was replaced by Jason Siggers. On December 2, 2018, Lewis joined Kymi of the Greek Basket League. He averaged 16.1 points, 2.2 rebounds, 5.7 assists and 1.4 steals per game over 16 games with Kymis. On August 28, 2019, Lewis signed with PAOK Thessaloniki and remained in Greece. Lewis averaged 9.5 points and 5.3 assists per game. He was eventually replaced by Bobby Brown in early January 2020. Lewis subsequently joined Ramat HaSharon and averaged 17.8 points and 6.5 assists per game. On August 2, 2021, he signed with Kalev/Cramo of VTB United League. On January 20, 2022, JeQuan parted ways with the team. On July 22, 2022, he signed with Rostock Seawolves of the German Basketball Bundesliga.

On June 20, 2023, he signed with JL Bourg of the LNB Pro A.

On October 30, 2024, Lewis signed with Qingdao Eagles of the Chinese Basketball Association (CBA). On December 7, he was replaced by Kendall Smith.

On December 25, 2024, he signed with Rostock Seawolves of the Basketball Bundesliga (BBL).

On June 24, 2025, he signed with Igokea m:tel of the Bosnian League.
