= Hugo Benitez =

French basketball player (born 2001)

- Benitez with Manresa in 2026

No. 2 – Bàsquet Manresa
- Position: Point guard
- League: Liga ACB; EuroCup

Personal information
- Born: January 20, 2001 (age 25) Toulouges, France
- Listed height: 1.92 m (6 ft 4 in)
- Listed weight: 84 kg (185 lb)

Career information
- NBA draft: 2023: undrafted
- Playing career: 2019–present

Career history
- 2019–2025: JL Bourg
- 2025–present: Manresa

Hugo Benitez (born January 20, 2001) is a French professional basketball player for Bàsquet Manresa of the Liga ACB and the EuroCup. Standing at a height of 1.92 m (6 ft 3 1/2 in), Benitez plays as a point guard. He has also represented the French national team internationally.

== Early life and youth career ==
Benitez grew up in Toulouges, a suburb near Perpignan in the Roussillon region. He started playing basketball in the youth ranks of USA Toulouges. In 2016, Benitez joined JL Bourg's academy.

== Professional career ==
=== JL Bourg (2019–2025) ===
In 2017, Benitez joined Bourg's U18 team. He made his professional debut with Bourg's senior team during the 2019–20 Pro A season. In April 2020, he signed his first professional contract, a three-season deal with JL Bourg of the LNB Élite. In March 2023, Benitez signed a contract extension for three more seasons with Bourg.

=== Bàsquet Manresa (2025–present) ===
On June 14, 2025, Benitez signed with Bàsquet Manresa of the Liga ACB and the EuroCup, signing a three-season deal. On September 21, 2025, Benitez helped Manresa win the 2025 edition of the Lliga Catalana de Bàsquet, beating Joventut in the finals. He was also selected as the Finals MVP. He would be sidelined for most of the 2025–26 season due to injury.

== National team career ==
Benitez has represented the youth ranks of the French national team internationally, playing in the 2021 FIBA U20 European Challengers with the France men's national under-20 basketball team. He made his debut with the senior French national team in February 2022, in a game against Portugal during the 2023 World Cup qualifiers.

== Career statistics ==
Legend
GP	Games played	GS	Games started	MPG	Minutes per game
FG%	Field goal percentage	3P%	3-point field goal percentage	FT%	Free throw percentage
RPG	Rebounds per game	APG	Assists per game	SPG	Steals per game
BPG	Blocks per game	PPG	Points per game	**Bold**	Career high

=== EuroCup ===
Year	Team	GP	GS	MPG	FG%	3P%	FT%	RPG	APG	SPG	BPG	PPG	PIR
2020–21	JL Bourg	14	1	16.5	.303	.129	.750	1.4	2.9	1.1	–	3.4	2.9
2021–22	JL Bourg	17	2	20.2	.440	.348	.957	2.2	3.4	1.4	–	6.1	9.0
2022–23	JL Bourg	19	4	19.7	.374	.242	.692	1.5	2.8	.8	.1	5.9	5.3
2023–24	JL Bourg	11	4	20.8	.429	.333	.864	1.6	4.2	.8	–	7.0	8.9
2024–25	JL Bourg	17	6	21.9	.504	.323	.739	2.5	5.2	1.2	.1	8.8	12.4
2025–26	Manresa	11	8	21.9	.420	.250	.895	2.8	6.0	1.0	.1	9.5	11.0
Career		89	25	20.1	.411	.260	.821	2.0	4.0	1.1	.1	6.7	8.2

=== Domestic leagues ===
Year	Team	League	GP	MPG	FG%	3P%	FT%	RPG	APG	SPG	BPG	PPG
2025–26	(Spain) Manresa	ACB	14	20.6	.438	.367	.727	2.5	4.8	1.2	.1	10.5
