= Zaccharie Risacher =

French basketball player (born 2005)

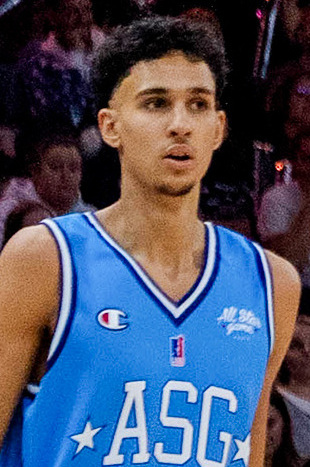
- Risacher in the 2023 LNB All-Star Game

No. 10 – Dallas Mavericks
- Position: Small forward
- League: NBA

Personal information
- Born: 8 April 2005 (age 21) Málaga, Spain
- Listed height: 6 ft 8 in (2.03 m)
- Listed weight: 200 lb (91 kg)

Career information
- NBA draft: 2024: 1st round, 1st overall pick
- Drafted by: Atlanta Hawks
- Playing career: 2020–present

Career history
- 2021–2024: LDLC ASVEL
- 2023–2024: →JL Bourg
- 2024–2026: Atlanta Hawks
- 2026–present: Dallas Mavericks

Career highlights
- NBA All-Rookie First Team (2025); EuroCup Rising Star (2024); LNB Élite champion (2022); LNB Élite Best Young Player (2024); Leaders Cup winner (2023); LNB All-Star (2023); Nike Hoop Summit (2023)
- Stats at NBA.com
- Stats at Basketball Reference
Medals
Men's basketball
Representing France
FIBA U19 World Cup
Silver medal – second place	2023 Hungary	Team
FIBA U17 World Cup
Bronze medal – third place	2022 Spain	Team

Zaccharie Risacher (/ˈzækəri ˌriːzɑːˈʃeɪ/ ZAK-ər-ee REE-zah-SHAY; French pronunciation: [zakaʁi ʁizaʃe]; born 8 April 2005) is a Spanish-born French professional basketball player for the Dallas Mavericks of the National Basketball Association (NBA). He was selected with the first overall pick by the Atlanta Hawks in the 2024 NBA draft.

== Early life ==
Risacher was born on 8 April 2005, in Málaga, Spain, where his father, Stéphane Risacher, played professional basketball for Baloncesto Málaga from 2002 to 2006. His family moved back to Lyon, France, where he started playing club basketball at Élan Chalon at the age of three and a half, at youth club Tassin in the suburbs of the city.

Risacher entered the youth program of ASVEL Basket in August 2020. He primarily played for the club's youth team in LNB Espoirs, the French under-21 league.

== Professional career ==
=== LDLC ASVEL (2021–2024) ===
Risacher made his debut with ASVEL's senior team in 2021, in a LNB Élite match against Metropolitans 92. He also made his EuroLeague debut later in the season, on 18 January 2022, in a 75–100 loss to Monaco. He averaged 12.5 points and 4.4 rebounds per game in the LNB Espoirs competition.

=== JL Bourg (2023–2024) ===
On 16 June 2023, Risacher signed his first professional contract with ASVEL, before being immediately loaned out to fellow first-tier club JL Bourg for the 2023–24 season. On 29 November 2023, he was named to Team France for the LNB All-Star Game.

Internationally, Risacher featured for JL Bourg in the 2023–24 EuroCup, where the team eventually reached the Finals, before losing to fellow French side Paris Basketball. In April, Risacher was awarded the EuroCup Rising Star prize; at the age of 18 years and 362 days, he became the second-youngest player to win the award, being just a month older than Džanan Musa, who had won the award in 2018.

On 12 May 2024, Risacher was named the Best Young Player of the 2023–24 LNB Élite season, having averaged 10.1 points and 3.8 rebounds in 22 minutes per game.

=== Atlanta Hawks (2024–2026) ===
On 22 April 2024, Risacher announced that he had declared for the 2024 NBA draft; his entry was confirmed by the NBA on 2 May.

==== 2024–25 season ====
On 26 June 2024, Risacher was selected by the Atlanta Hawks with the first overall pick in the 2024 NBA draft. In the process, he became the second consecutive French player to be drafted with the number one pick, after San Antonio Spurs had picked Victor Wembanyama in the previous year's draft; furthermore, he became the 7th international player to be taken with the first selection, after Wembanyama himself, Andrea Bargnani (in 2006), Andrew Bogut (in 2005), Yao Ming (in 2002), Hakeem Olajuwon (in 1984), and Mychal Thompson (in 1978). Risacher was selected alongside fellow Frenchmen Alex Sarr (drafted by the Washington Wizards with the second pick) and Tidjane Salaün (drafted by the Charlotte Hornets with the sixth pick), making France the first foreign nation to have at least three native players picked in the top 10 spots of any NBA draft.

On 6 July 2024, Risacher signed with the Hawks and six days later, he made his NBA Summer League debut against the Washington Wizards, recording 18 points, five rebounds and two assists in a 94–88 loss. Risacher made his NBA regular-season debut on 23 October, recording seven points and one rebound in 19 minutes played in a 120–116 win over the Brooklyn Nets. On 6 November, Risacher put up a career-high 33 points in a 121–115 win over the New York Knicks. On 30 March, 2025, Risacher scored a then career-high 36 points in a 145–124 win over the Milwaukee Bucks. He became the fourth 1st overall pick to record 35+ points, 5+ threes in a game as a rookie after Allen Iverson, LeBron James and Anthony Edwards. On 10 April, Risacher put up a career-high 38 points in a 133–109 win over the Brooklyn Nets.

==== 2025–26 season ====
During his sophomore season, Risacher's playing time and usage decreased. On 7 January 2026, he put up a season-high 25 points, alongside eight rebounds, in a 117–100 win over the New Orleans Pelicans.

The Hawks faced the New York Knicks during their first-round playoff series. On 18 April, Risacher made his playoff debut, recording four rebounds in a 113–102 Game 1 loss. The Hawks lost the series in six games, and Risacher played sparingly, averaging 3.7 points in 7.7 minutes per game.

=== Dallas Mavericks (2026–present) ===
On 19 July 2026, Risacher was traded to the Dallas Mavericks in a three-team trade in which the Hawks acquired Ryan Nembhard and Luguentz Dort. On 21 October, Risacher made his Mavericks debut, recording four points, six rebounds, two assists and five steals in a 128–110 loss to the Houston Rockets.

== National team career ==
Risacher played for the France under-17 basketball team at the 2022 FIBA Under-17 Basketball World Cup. He struggled with consistency during the tournament which culminated in a zero-point, five-turnover performance in the final against Spain. He averaged 10.4 points and 4.4 rebounds per game as France won the bronze medal.

Risacher debuted with the France senior team on 23 February 2024 against Croatia, but was forced to leave the game after four minutes due to a concussion. He later re-joined France for their EuroBasket 2025 qualifying games. He later made the final selection for EuroBasket 2025, and averaged 9.7 points, 4.2 rebounds and 1.7 assists per game.

== Player profile ==
Playing at small forward, Risacher is a catch-and-shoot player and a shooter off screens or from mid-range. His versatility has been noted for his ability to defend both guards and forwards at times.

== Career statistics ==
Legend
GP	Games played	GS	Games started	MPG	Minutes per game
FG%	Field goal percentage	3P%	3-point field goal percentage	FT%	Free throw percentage
RPG	Rebounds per game	APG	Assists per game	SPG	Steals per game
BPG	Blocks per game	PPG	Points per game	**Bold**	Career high

=== NBA ===
==== Regular season ====
Year	Team	GP	GS	MPG	FG%	3P%	FT%	RPG	APG	SPG	BPG	PPG
2024–25	Atlanta	**75**	**73**	**24.6**	**.458**	.355	**.711**	3.6	**1.2**	.7	.5	**12.6**
2025–26	Atlanta	67	46	22.4	.455	**.368**	.644	**3.8**	1.1	**.9**	.5	9.6
Career		142	119	23.6	.457	.360	.686	3.7	1.2	.8	.5	11.1

==== Playoffs ====
Year	Team	GP	GS	MPG	FG%	3P%	FT%	RPG	APG	SPG	BPG	PPG
2026	Atlanta	3	0	7.7	.357	.200		3.0	.0	.0	.0	3.7
Career		3	0	7.7	.357	.200		3.0	.0	.0	.0	3.7

== Personal life ==
Risacher is of Martiniquais descent through his father, Stéphane Risacher, who also played basketball professionally; Stéphane won a silver medal at the 2000 Summer Olympics with the France national team. Risacher's younger sister, Aïnhoa, is also a professional basketball player, currently playing for the LDLC ASVEL Féminin of the Ligue Féminine de Basketball.
