= Noah Starkey =

American basketball player

No. 20 – Oklahoma City Blue
- Position: Center
- League: NBA G League

Personal information
- Born: February 19, 1997 (age 29) Everett, WA, U.S.
- Listed height: 6 ft 11 in (2.11 m)
- Listed weight: 250 lb (113 kg)

Career information
- High school: Central Christian (Hutchinson, Kansas)
- College: Southern Nazarene (2015–2019)
- NBA draft: 2019: undrafted
- Playing career: 2019–present

Career history
- 2019–2020: FC Porto
- 2021: Lovćen 1947
- 2021–2022: Kirchheim Knights
- 2022: Oklahoma City Blue
- 2022–2023: Fort Wayne Mad Ants
- 2023–2024: Oklahoma City Blue
- 2024: Winnipeg Sea Bears
- 2024–present: Oklahoma City Blue

Career highlights
- NBA G League champion (2024); First-team All-GAC (2019); Second-team All-GAC (2018); 2× GAC Defender of the Year (2018, 2019)

Noah Starkey (born February 19, 1997) is an American professional basketball player for the Oklahoma City Blue of the NBA G League. He played college basketball for the Southern Nazarene Crimson Storm.

== High school career ==
Starkey attended Central Christian School at Hutchinson, Kansas, where he averaged 19 points, 13.4 rebounds and 4.7 blocks as a senior, being named All-State and Most Outstanding Player at the state tournament.

== College career ==
Starkey played college basketball at Southern Nazarene where he averaged 14.9 points, 7.6 rebounds and 2.0 blocks, being named GAC Defensive Player of the Year for the second straight season. He finished his college career with 187 total blocks, becoming both the all-time leader in school's history, as well as second in GAC history while earning the single season record with 64.

== Professional career ==
=== FC Porto (2019–2020) ===
After going undrafted in the 2019 NBA draft, Starkey signed with FC Porto of the Liga Portuguesa de Basquetebol on July 24, 2019, averaging 7.1 points and 4.5 rebounds in eight games.

=== Lovćen 1947 (2021) ===
On February 12, 2021, Starkey signed with Lovćen 1947 of the Montenegrin League, where he averaged 10.0 points and 6.0 rebounds in eight games.

=== Kirchheim Knights (2021–2022) ===
Before the 2021–2022 season, Starkey signed with Kirchheim Knights of the German ProA, averaging 7.6 points, 4.4 rebounds and 0.7 blocks in 29 games.

=== Oklahoma City Blue / Fort Wayne Mad Ants (2022–2024) ===
On October 22, 2022, Starkey was taken in the second round of the 2022 NBA G League draft by the Oklahoma City Blue, but was waived on November 1. On November 15, he re-signed with the Blue, but was waived on November 27.

On December 10, 2022, Starkey signed with the Fort Wayne Mad Ants, but was waived on December 17.

On January 3, 2023, Starkey re-signed with the Blue, but waived him on February 3. Two days later, he re-signed with Fort Wayne.

On October 28, 2023, Starkey re-joined the now Indiana Mad Ants, but was waived on November 2. Two days later, he returned to the Blue, where he ended up helping them to win a title.

=== Winnipeg Sea Bears (2024) ===
On July 2, 2024, Starkey signed with the Winnipeg Sea Bears of the Canadian Elite Basketball League.

=== Return to Oklahoma City (2024–present) ===
On October 25, 2024, Starkey rejoined the Oklahoma City Blue.

== Personal life ==
The son of David and Karla Starkey, he has two brothers. He majored in business pre-law.
