= Kendall Smith (basketball) =

American basketball player (born 1995)

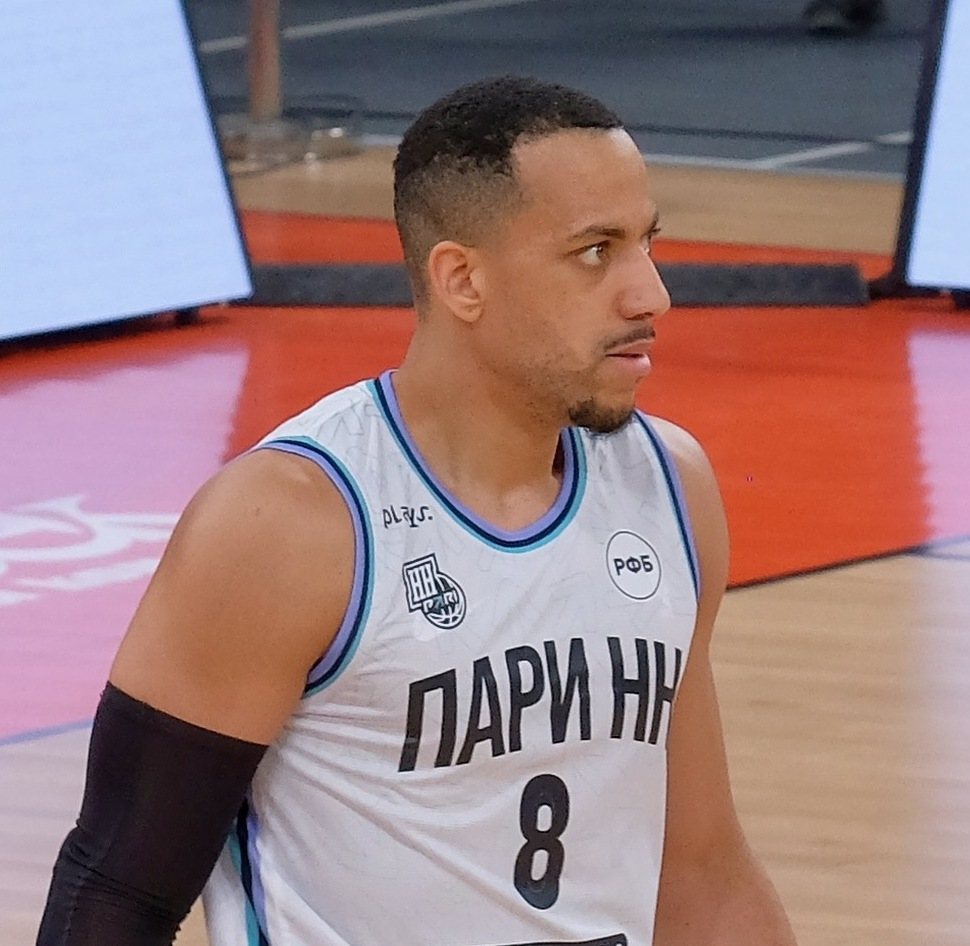
- Kendall Clay Smith

Suke Lions
- Position: Point guard / Shooting guard
- League: NBL

Personal information
- Born: September 18, 1995 (age 31) Alameda County, California, U.S.
- Listed height: 6 ft 2.75 in (1.90 m)
- Listed weight: 190 lb (86 kg)

Career information
- High school: Deer Valley (Antioch, California)
- College: UNLV (2013–2015); Cal State Northridge (2016–2017); Oklahoma State (2017–2018)
- NBA draft: 2018: undrafted
- Playing career: 2018–present

Career history
- 2018: Nymburk
- 2018–2019: Okapi Aalst
- 2019: Westchester Knicks
- 2020: Stockton Kings
- 2021–2022: Santa Cruz Warriors
- 2022: Maine Celtics
- 2022–2023: Kolossos Rodou
- 2023: Çayırova Belediyesi
- 2023–2024: PAOK Thessaloniki
- 2024: Nizhny Novgorod
- 2024: Panionios
- 2024–2025: Qingdao Eagles
- 2025: Chorale Roanne
- 2025–2026: Koroivos Amaliadas
- 2026–present: Suke Lions

Career highlights
- Second-team All-Big West (2017)

Kendall Clay Smith (born September 18, 1995) is an American professional basketball player for Suke Lions of the National Basketball League (NBL).. He plays at both the point guard and shooting guard positions.

== Professional career ==
After going undrafted in the 2018 NBA draft, Smith started his professional career with ERA Nymburk of the National Basketball League. On December, he left Nymburk and joined Okapi Aalst in Belgium.

On November 11, 2019, it was announced that Smith will be in the roster for the Westchester Knicks. However, he only played 3 games with the Knicks. For the remainder of the season, he played with the Stockton Kings.

On December 12, 2022, Smith joined Kolossos Rodou of the Greek Basket League.

On November 8, 2023, Smith signed with Greek club PAOK. On January, he left PAOK and joined Russian club Nizhny Novgorod of the VTB United League.

On July 24, 2024, Smith signed with Panionios of the Greek Basket League.

On December 7, 2024, Smith signed with Qingdao Eagles of the Chinese Basketball Association (CBA). He finished the season in France with Chorale Roanne.
