= 2023–24 EuroCup Basketball =

European basketball competition

2023–24 BKT EuroCup^{1}
- Season: 2023–24
- Dates: 3 October 2023–12 April 2024
- Games played: 180 + Playoffs
- Teams: 20

Regular season
- Season MVP: (Basketball Federation of North Macedonia) T. J. Shorts (Paris)

Finals
- Champions: (French Federation of Basketball) Paris Basketball (1st title)
- Runners-up: (French Federation of Basketball) Mincidelice JL Bourg
- Semi-finalists: (Turkish Basketball Federation) Beşiktaş Emlakjet (United Kingdom) London Lions
- Finals MVP: (Basketball Federation of North Macedonia) T. J. Shorts (Paris)

Awards
- Coach of the Year: (Finland) Tuomas Iisalo
- Rising Star: (France) Zaccharie Risacher

Statistical leaders
Points	Deividas Sirvydis	18.9
Rebounds	Trevion Williams	10.8
Assists	T. J. Shorts	7.3
Index Rating	T. J. Shorts	23.2

Records
- Biggest home win: Gran Canaria 111–82 Ulm (11 October 2023)
- Biggest away win: Trento 60–98 Cluj (15 November 2023)
- Highest scoring: Cluj 120–111 Lietkabelis (29 November 2023)
- Lowest scoring: Aris 59–61 Cluj (1 November 2023)
- Highest attendance: Beşiktaş 82–71 JL Bourg (29 March 2024) – 16,000
- Lowest attendance: London 90–98 Hapoel (2 November 2023) – 85
- All statistics correct as of 9 November 2023.^{1} Sponsored name, referring to BKT.

The 2023–24 EuroCup Basketball season was the 22nd season of Euroleague Basketball's secondary level professional club basketball tournament. It was the 16th season since it was renamed from the ULEB Cup to the EuroCup, and the first season under the new title sponsorship name of BKT The season began on 3 October 2023 and will end at the latest on 17 April 2024 with the Finals.

Dreamland Gran Canaria were the defending champions after refusing to take part in the 2023–24 EuroLeague via spot granted to the title holders, but were eliminated in eighthfinals.

Paris Basketball swept Mincidelice JL Bourg to achieve its first continental crown by winning its first EuroCup title in an almost perfect season with 22 wins and only one loss balance that earned it a spot in the 2024–25 EuroLeague. It was also the second French side to win the EuroCup after AS Monaco triumph in the 2020–21 season.

== Format changes ==
The format changes consisted of reformatting the Playoffs. Access to the stage was reduced with only six teams per group qualifying instead of eight, with the top two from each group bypassing the Eighthfinals and proceeding directly to the Quarterfinals. Furthermore, the Semifinals and Finals were switched back to a best-of-three series format, returning to it after two seasons.

== Team allocation ==
A total of 20 teams from 14 countries participatedin the 2023–24 EuroCup season. On June 29, 2023, Euroleague Basketball confirmed the team list for this season. Three new teams joined the competition and Wolves will make their debut appearance.

=== Teams ===
League positions after playoffs of the previous season shown in parentheses (TH: EuroCup title holders).

Qualified teams for 2023–24 EuroCup Basketball (by entry round)
Regular season
(Basketball Federation of Montenegro) Budućnost VOLI (3rd)	(Spanish Basketball Federation) Joventut Badalona (4th)
(Basketball Federation of Slovenia) Cedevita Olimpija (4th)	(Spanish Basketball Federation) Dreamland Gran Canaria (7th)^{TH}
(French Federation of Basketball) Mincidelice JL Bourg (4th)	(Turkish Basketball Federation) Türk Telekom (3rd)
(French Federation of Basketball) Paris Basketball (9th)	(Turkish Basketball Federation) Beşiktaş Emlakjet (14th)
(German Basketball Federation) ratiopharm Ulm (1st)	(Hellenic Basketball Federation) Aris Midea (8th)
(German Basketball Federation) Veolia Towers Hamburg (15th)	(Israeli Basketball Association) Hapoel Shlomo Tel Aviv (2nd)
(Italian Basketball Federation) Umana Reyer Venezia (5th)	(Polish Basketball Federation) Śląsk Wrocław (2nd)
(Italian Basketball Federation) Dolomiti Energia Trento (6th)	(Romanian Basketball Federation) U-BT Cluj-Napoca (1st)
(Lithuanian Basketball Federation) 7bet-Lietkabelis (3rd)	(Basketball Federation of Ukraine) Prometey (1st)
(Lithuanian Basketball Federation) Wolves (5th)	(British Basketball) London Lions (1st)

Notes

1. ABA League (ABA): Budućnost VOLI and Cedevita Olimpija qualified through the ABA League.
2. Latvian–Estonian Basketball League (LEBL): Prometey qualified through the Latvian–Estonian Basketball League.

== Round and draw dates ==
The schedule of the competition was as follows.

Schedule for 2023–24 EuroCup Basketball
Phase	Round	Draw date	First leg	Second leg	Third leg
Regular season	Round 1	7 July 2023	3–4 October 2023		
Regular season	Round 2	7 July 2023	10–11 October 2023		
Regular season	Round 3	7 July 2023	17–18 October 2023		
Regular season	Round 4	7 July 2023	24–25 October 2023		
Regular season	Round 5	7 July 2023	31 October–1 November 2023		
Regular season	Round 6	7 July 2023	7–8 November 2023		
Regular season	Round 7	7 July 2023	14–15 November 2023		
Regular season	Round 8	7 July 2023	21–22 November 2023		
Regular season	Round 9	7 July 2023	28–29 November 2023		
Regular season	Round 10	7 July 2023	5–6 December 2023		
Regular season	Round 11	7 July 2023	12–13 December 2023		
Regular season	Round 12	7 July 2023	19–20 December 2023		
Regular season	Round 13	7 July 2023	26–27 December 2023		
Regular season	Round 14	7 July 2023	9–10 January 2024		
Regular season	Round 15	7 July 2023	16–17 January 2024		
Regular season	Round 16	7 July 2023	23–24 January 2024		
Regular season	Round 17	7 July 2023	30–31 January 2024		
Regular season	Round 18	7 July 2023	6–7 February 2024		
Playoffs	Eighthfinals	7 July 2023	5–6 March 2024		
Playoffs	Quarterfinals	7 July 2023	12–13 March 2024		
Playoffs	Semifinals	7 July 2023	26 March 2024	29 March 2024	3 April 2024
Playoffs	Finals	7 July 2023	9 April 2024	12 April 2024	17 April 2024

=== Draw ===
The draw was held on 7 July 2023 in Barcelona, Spain.

The 20 teams were drawn into two groups of 10, with the restriction that teams from the same league could not be drawn against each other, except when there were more than two teams from the same league participating in the regular season. For the draw, the teams were seeded into 10 pots, in accordance with the Club Ranking, based on their performance in European competitions during a three-year period and the lowest possible position that any club from that league can occupy in the draw is calculated by adding the results of the worst performing team from each league.

Pot 1 Team (Spanish Basketball Federation) Dreamland Gran Canaria (Israeli Basketball Association) Hapoel Shlomo Tel Aviv	Pot 2 Team (Spanish Basketball Federation) Joventut Badalona (Basketball Federation of Montenegro) Budućnost VOLI
Pot 3 Team (Basketball Federation of Slovenia) Cedevita Olimpija (German Basketball Federation) ratiopharm Ulm	Pot 4 Team (French Federation of Basketball) Mincidelice JL Bourg (French Federation of Basketball) Paris Basketball
Pot 5 Team (Italian Basketball Federation) Umana Reyer Venezia (Turkish Basketball Federation) Türk Telekom	Pot 6 Team (Lithuanian Basketball Federation) 7bet-Lietkabelis (Lithuanian Basketball Federation) Wolves
Pot 7 Team (Hellenic Basketball Federation) Aris Midea (Turkish Basketball Federation) Beşiktaş Emlakjet	Pot 8 Team (German Basketball Federation) Veolia Towers Hamburg (Italian Basketball Federation) Dolomiti Energia Trento
Pot 9 Team (Polish Basketball Federation) Śląsk Wrocław (Basketball Federation of Ukraine) Prometey	Pot 10 Team (British Basketball) London Lions (Romanian Basketball Federation) U-BT Cluj-Napoca

The fixtures were decided after the draw, using a computer draw not shown to public, with the following match sequence:

Note: Positions for scheduling do not use the seeding pots, e.g., Team 1 is not necessarily the team from Pot 1 in the draw.

Round	Matches
Round 1	10 v 5, 6 v 4, 7 v 3, 8 v 2, 9 v 1
Round 2	1 v 10, 2 v 9, 3 v 8, 4 v 7, 5 v 6
Round 3	10 v 6, 7 v 5, 8 v 4, 9 v 3, 1 v 2
Round 4	2 v 10, 3 v 1, 4 v 9, 5 v 8, 6 v 7
Round 5	10 v 7, 8 v 6, 9 v 5, 1 v 4, 2 v 3
Round 6	3 v 10, 4 v 2, 5 v 1, 6 v 9, 7 v 8
Round 7	10 v 8, 9 v 7, 1 v 6, 2 v 5, 3 v 4
Round 8	10 v 4, 5 v 3, 6 v 2, 7 v 1, 8 v 9
Round 9	9 v 10, 1 v 8, 2 v 7, 3 v 6, 4 v 5

Round	Matches
Round 10	5 v 10, 4 v 6, 3 v 7, 2 v 8, 1 v 9
Round 11	10 v 1, 9 v 2, 8 v 3, 7 v 4, 6 v 5
Round 12	6 v 10, 5 v 7, 4 v 8, 3 v 9, 2 v 1
Round 13	10 v 2, 1 v 3, 9 v 4, 8 v 5, 7 v 6
Round 14	7 v 10, 6 v 8, 5 v 9, 4 v 1, 3 v 2
Round 15	10 v 3, 2 v 4, 1 v 5, 9 v 6, 8 v 7
Round 16	8 v 10, 7 v 9, 6 v 1, 5 v 2, 4 v 3
Round 17	4 v 10, 3 v 5, 2 v 6, 1 v 7, 9 v 8
Round 18	10 v 9, 8 v 1, 7 v 2, 6 v 3, 5 v 4

There were scheduling restrictions: for example, teams from the same city in general were not scheduled to play at home on the same round (to avoid them playing at home on the same day or on consecutive days, due to logistics and crowd control).

== Regular season ==
Location of teams of the 2023–24 EuroCup regular season.
Red: Group A; Green: Group B.

The regular season started on 3 October 2023 and ended on 7 February 2024. In each group, teams played against each other home-and-away in a round-robin format where only six teams advanced to the playoffs. Moreover, the top two teams in each regular season group received first round playoff byes, skipping the eighthfinals to be placed directly into the quarterfinals. At the tail end of the standings, four teams from each group were eliminated after the regular season. Alongside 17 returning teams from last season, Wolves made its debut appearance, and Aris Midea and Beşiktaş Emlakjet welcomed back to the EuroCup eight years later.

=== Group A ===
==== Standings ====
Pos	Team	Pld	W	L	PF	PA	PD	Qualification
1	(French Federation of Basketball) Paris Basketball	18	17	1	1754	1401	+353	Advance to quarterfinals
2	(Israeli Basketball Association) Hapoel Shlomo Tel Aviv	18	13	5	1729	1600	+129	Advance to quarterfinals
3	(British Basketball) London Lions	18	12	6	1608	1546	+62	Advance to eighthfinals
4	(Basketball Federation of Ukraine) Prometey	18	10	8	1598	1574	+24	Advance to eighthfinals
5	(Spanish Basketball Federation) Joventut Badalona	18	10	8	1517	1503	+14	Advance to eighthfinals
6	(Turkish Basketball Federation) Beşiktaş Emlakjet	18	9	9	1400	1428	−28	Advance to eighthfinals
7	(Lithuanian Basketball Federation) Wolves	18	8	10	1462	1550	−88	
8	(Italian Basketball Federation) Umana Reyer Venezia	18	8	10	1507	1538	−31	
9	(German Basketball Federation) Veolia Towers Hamburg	18	2	16	1478	1762	−284	
10	(Basketball Federation of Slovenia) Cedevita Olimpija	18	1	17	1509	1660	−151	

Source: EuroCup
Rules for classification: All points scored in extra period(s) were not counted in the standings, nor for any tie-break situation.

==== Results ====
Home \ Away	BJK	COL	HTA	CJB	LDN	PBB	PRM	URV	HAM	WLV
Beşiktaş Emlakjet (Turkish Basketball Federation)	—	73–66	73–94	81–85	80–83	72–95	92–70	74–68	90–78	72–59
Cedevita Olimpija (Basketball Federation of Slovenia)	83–88	—	80–95	87–88	85–92	77–93	83–90	93–104	83–86	78–86
Hapoel Shlomo Tel Aviv (Israeli Basketball Association)	81–75	100–73	—	103–99	96–100	86–104	105–113	100–81	118–101	89–80
Joventut Badalona (Spanish Basketball Federation)	62–63	83–81	85–91	—	76–87	94–101	79–76	89–81	108–76	107–98
London Lions (British Basketball)	93–72	101–95	90–98	80–82	—	102–106	89–88	76–69	81–83	80–85
Paris Basketball (French Federation of Basketball)	63–68	119–66	114–87	89–82	94–77	—	93–72	100–70	120–91	105–78
Prometey (Basketball Federation of Ukraine)	89–70	105–100	98–89	94–80	87–99	79–96	—	89–82	97–77	91–64
Umana Reyer Venezia (Italian Basketball Federation)	106–96	95–87	81–97	79–64	91–95	75–81	108–92	—	94–77	57–75
Veolia Towers Hamburg (German Basketball Federation)	83–94	83–114	72–111	90–96	94–100	69–105	83–97	83–90	—	71–84
Wolves (Lithuanian Basketball Federation)	90–88	91–89	81–89	79–94	87–101	79–110	85–71	77–93	94–84	—

Source: EuroCup
Legend: Blue = home team win; Red = away team win.
Matches with lighter background shading were decided after overtime.

=== Group B ===
==== Standings ====
Pos	Team	Pld	W	L	PF	PA	PD	Qualification
1	(French Federation of Basketball) Mincidelice JL Bourg	18	14	4	1486	1368	+118	Advance to quarterfinals
2	(Romanian Basketball Federation) U-BT Cluj-Napoca	18	13	5	1519	1461	+58	Advance to quarterfinals
3	(Spanish Basketball Federation) Dreamland Gran Canaria	18	12	6	1567	1408	+159	Advance to eighthfinals
4	(German Basketball Federation) ratiopharm Ulm	18	10	8	1502	1522	−20	Advance to eighthfinals
5	(Hellenic Basketball Federation) Aris Midea	18	9	9	1335	1334	+1	Advance to eighthfinals
6	(Turkish Basketball Federation) Türk Telekom	18	8	10	1433	1421	+12	Advance to eighthfinals
7	(Basketball Federation of Montenegro) Budućnost VOLI	18	8	10	1413	1443	−30	
8	(Italian Basketball Federation) Dolomiti Energia Trento	18	7	11	1409	1485	−76	
9	(Lithuanian Basketball Federation) 7bet-Lietkabelis	18	7	11	1466	1544	−78	
10	(Polish Basketball Federation) Śląsk Wrocław	18	2	16	1371	1515	−144	

Source: EuroCup
Rules for classification: All points scored in extra period(s) were not counted in the standings, nor for any tie-break situation.

==== Results ====
Home \ Away	LIE	ARI	BUD	TRE	DGC	JLB	ULM	WKS	TTA	UBT
7bet-Lietkabelis (Lithuanian Basketball Federation)	—	84–74	81–83	92–93	84–92	100–96	94–90	91–75	93–86	92–87
Aris Midea (Hellenic Basketball Federation)	69–60	—	76–75	84–77	66–82	68–76	88–99	93–71	68–66	59–61
Budućnost VOLI (Basketball Federation of Montenegro)	76–65	63–65	—	98–96	90–77	78–74	80–84	103–89	73–96	77–79
Dolomiti Energia Trento (Italian Basketball Federation)	76–70	69–67	78–97	—	73–87	72–79	83–85	85–79	101–96	60–98
Dreamland Gran Canaria (Spanish Basketball Federation)	88–77	93–65	97–70	76–98	—	84–76	111–82	81–77	73–83	111–113
Mincidelice JL Bourg (French Federation of Basketball)	104–71	72–65	78–73	79–67	92–84	—	81–85	90–74	86–67	92–88
ratiopharm Ulm (German Basketball Federation)	99–74	66–86	84–67	80–70	103–99	84–89	—	108–103	79–85	81–85
Śląsk Wrocław (Polish Basketball Federation)	71–75	63–80	79–80	75–84	68–92	63–72	100–88	—	70–86	67–70
Türk Telekom (Turkish Basketball Federation)	88–73	85–95	79–77	78–70	69–82	64–68	78–91	71–80	—	95–84
U-BT Cluj-Napoca (Romanian Basketball Federation)	120–111	90–74	89–74	88–83	70–92	89–98	86–75	80–76	80–71	—

Source: EuroCup
Legend: Blue = home team win; Red = away team win.
Matches with lighter background shading were decided after overtime.

== Playoffs ==
In the playoffs, teams played against each other in a knockout tournament into four rounds from eighthfinals to finals. At the end of the regular season, the six teams from each group with the most wins qualified for the playoffs. The two top teams from each regular season group received a bye and qualified directly to the quarterfinals. The remaining eight qualified teams entered the eighthfinals to compete in a single-game format in which the third-placed teams of each group faced off against the sixth-placed teams of the opposite groups and the fourth-placed teams of each group faced off against the fifth-placed teams of the opposite groups. The four winning teams from eighthfinals entered the quarterfinals to faced off in a single-game format in the home of the two top teams from each regular season group. The higher-placed regular season team in each matchup enjoyed home court advantage in eighthfinals and quarterfinals. From semifinals onwards, teams played in best-of-three series with the first leg and third leg, if necessary, in the home court of the higher-placed regular season team to crown the EuroCup champion.

=== Bracket ===
Eighthfinals
(German Basketball Federation) ratiopharm Ulm	79
(Spanish Basketball Federation) Joventut Badalona	88
(British Basketball) London Lions	100
(Turkish Basketball Federation) Türk Telekom	77
(Basketball Federation of Ukraine) Prometey	95
(Hellenic Basketball Federation) Aris Midea	67
(Spanish Basketball Federation) Dreamland Gran Canaria	78
(Turkish Basketball Federation) Beşiktaş Emlakjet	80

Quarterfinals
(French Federation of Basketball) Paris Basketball	86
(Spanish Basketball Federation) Joventut Badalona	70
(Romanian Basketball Federation) U-BT Cluj-Napoca	79
(British Basketball) London Lions	91
(French Federation of Basketball) Mincidelice JL Bourg	95
(Basketball Federation of Ukraine) Prometey	82
(Israeli Basketball Association) Hapoel Shlomo Tel Aviv	89
(Turkish Basketball Federation) Beşiktaş Emlakjet	94

Semifinals
(French Federation of Basketball) Paris Basketball	99	93	2
(British Basketball) London Lions	86	85	0
(French Federation of Basketball) Mincidelice JL Bourg	86	71	89	2
(Turkish Basketball Federation) Beşiktaş Emlakjet	74	82	63	1

Finals
(French Federation of Basketball) Paris Basketball	77	89	2
(French Federation of Basketball) Mincidelice JL Bourg	64	81	0

=== Eighthfinals ===
The eighthfinals were played on 5 and 6 March 2024.

Home team	Score	Away team
London Lions (British Basketball)	100–77	(Turkish Basketball Federation) Türk Telekom
ratiopharm Ulm (German Basketball Federation)	79–88	(Spanish Basketball Federation) Joventut Badalona
Dreamland Gran Canaria (Spanish Basketball Federation)	78–80	(Turkish Basketball Federation) Beşiktaş Emlakjet
Prometey (Basketball Federation of Ukraine)	95–67	(Hellenic Basketball Federation) Aris Midea

=== Quarterfinals ===
The quarterfinals were played on 12–14 March 2024.

Home team	Score	Away team
Paris Basketball (French Federation of Basketball)	86–70	(Spanish Basketball Federation) Joventut Badalona
U-BT Cluj-Napoca (Romanian Basketball Federation)	79–91	(British Basketball) London Lions
Mincidelice JL Bourg (French Federation of Basketball)	95–82	(Basketball Federation of Ukraine) Prometey
Hapoel Shlomo Tel Aviv (Israeli Basketball Association)	89–94	(Turkish Basketball Federation) Beşiktaş Emlakjet

=== Semifinals ===
The first legs were played on 26 March, the second legs on 29 March and the third legs on 3 April 2024, if necessary.

Team 1	Series	Team 2	1st leg	2nd leg	3rd leg
Paris Basketball (French Federation of Basketball)	2–0	(British Basketball) London Lions	99–86	93–85	—
Mincidelice JL Bourg (French Federation of Basketball)	2–1	(Turkish Basketball Federation) Beşiktaş Emlakjet	86–74	71–82	89–63

=== Finals ===
The first legs were played on 9 April, the second legs on 12 April and the third legs on 15 April 2024, if necessary.

Team 1	Series	Team 2	1st leg	2nd leg	3rd leg
Paris Basketball (French Federation of Basketball)	2–0	(French Federation of Basketball) Mincidelice JL Bourg	77–64	89–81	—

== Awards ==
=== EuroCup MVP ===
Player	Team	Ref.
(North Macedonia) T. J. Shorts	(French Federation of Basketball) Paris Basketball	

=== EuroCup Final MVP ===
Player	Team	Ref.
(North Macedonia) T. J. Shorts	(French Federation of Basketball) Paris Basketball	

=== BKT All–EuroCup Teams ===
BKT All–EuroCup First Team		BKT All–EuroCup Second Team		Ref
Player	Team	Player	Team	Ref
(North Macedonia) T. J. Shorts	(French Federation of Basketball) Paris Basketball	(Dominican Republic) Andrés Feliz	(Spanish Basketball Federation) Joventut Badalona	
(United States) Trevion Williams	(German Basketball Federation) Ratiopharm Ulm	(United States) Patrick Richard	(Romanian Basketball Federation) U-BT Cluj-Napoca	
(United Kingdom) Gabriel Olaseni	(British Basketball) London Lions	(France) Nadir Hifi	(French Federation of Basketball) Paris Basketball	
(Canada) Isiaha Mike	(French Federation of Basketball) Mincidelice JL Bourg	(Lithuania) Deividas Sirvydis	(Lithuanian Basketball Federation) Lietkabelis	
(United States) Matt Morgan	(British Basketball) London Lions	(Romania) Emanuel Cățe	(Romanian Basketball Federation) U-BT Cluj-Napoca	

=== Coach of the Year ===
Coach	Team	Ref.
(Finland) Tuomas Iisalo	(France) Paris Basketball	

=== Rising Star ===
Player	Team	Ref.
(France) Zaccharie Risacher	(French Federation of Basketball) JL Bourg	

=== MVP of the round ===
==== Regular season ====
Round	Player	Team	PIR	Ref.
1	(North Macedonia) T. J. Shorts	(French Federation of Basketball) Paris Basketball	30	
2	(United States) Matt Morgan	(British Basketball) London Lions	30	
3	(Slovakia) Vladimír Brodziansky	(Spanish Basketball Federation) Joventut Badalona	31	
3	(United States) Trevion Williams	(Germany) ratiopharm Ulm	31	
4	(United States) Tre'Shawn Thurman	(Lithuanian Basketball Federation) Wolves	37	
5	(United States) Andrew Andrews	(Spanish Basketball Federation) Joventut Badalona	42	
6	(Nigeria) Rasheed Sulaimon	(Lithuanian Basketball Federation) Wolves	36	
7	(Cuba) Karel Guzmán	(Romanian Basketball Federation) U-BT Cluj-Napoca	34	
8	(United States) Xavier Munford	(Israeli Basketball Association) Hapoel Tel Aviv	35	
9	(Canada) Conor Morgan	(British Basketball) London Lions	36	
10	(United States) Matt Morgan (x2)	(British Basketball) London Lions	32	
10	(North Macedonia) T. J. Shorts (x2)	(France) Paris Basketball	32	
11	(Czech Republic) Ondřej Balvín	(Basketball Federation of Ukraine) Prometey Slobozhanske	28	
12	(North Macedonia) T. J. Shorts (x3)	(French Federation of Basketball) Paris Basketball	37	
13	(United States) Tyrone Wallace	(Turkish Basketball Federation) Türk Telekom	39	
14	(Canada) Kyle Wiltjer	(Italian Basketball Federation) Umana Reyer Venezia	39	
15	(Dominican Republic) Ángel Delgado	(Turkish Basketball Federation) Beşiktaş Emlakjet	36	
16	(United States) Tyrone Wallace (x2)	(Turkish Basketball Federation) Türk Telekom	39	
17	(Romania) Emanuel Cățe	(Romanian Basketball Federation) U-BT Cluj-Napoca	38	
18	(Italy) Marco Spissu	(Italian Basketball Federation) Umana Reyer Venezia	29	

==== Playoffs ====
Round	Player	Team	PIR	Ref.
Eighthfinals	(Dominican Republic) Andrés Feliz	(Spanish Basketball Federation) Joventut Badalona	36	
Quarterfinals	(North Macedonia) T. J. Shorts (x4)	(French Federation of Basketball) Paris Basketball	28	
Semifinals	(North Macedonia) T. J. Shorts (x5)	(French Federation of Basketball) Paris Basketball	28.5	

== Average attendances ==
Pos	Team	Total	High	Low	Average
1	(Romanian Basketball Federation) U-BT Cluj-Napoca	75,032	10,000	4,474	7,503
2	(Lithuanian Basketball Federation) Wolves	39,949	8,257	2,617	4,439
3	(Turkish Basketball Federation) Türk Telekom	38,178	5,378	3,382	4,242
4	(Spanish Basketball Federation) Dreamland Gran Canaria	38,445	6,407	2,278	3,845
5	(French Federation of Basketball) Mincidelice JL Bourg	42,616	3,574	2,383	3,278
6	(Turkish Basketball Federation) Beşiktaş Emlakjet	32,116	15,644	252	3,212
7	(Spanish Basketball Federation) Joventut Badalona	28,551	4,596	2,333	3,172
8	(Hellenic Basketball Federation) Aris Midea	27,569	4,304	2,143	3,063
9	(British Basketball) London Lions	33,148	6,152	85	3,013
10	(French Federation of Basketball) Paris Basketball	32,103	7,998	835	2,675
11	(Lithuanian Basketball Federation) 7bet-Lietkabelis	22,922	3,389	1,839	2,547
12	(Italian Basketball Federation) Umana Reyer Venezia	22,645	3,056	1,683	2,516
13	(Basketball Federation of Montenegro) Budućnost VOLI	21,465	5,074	1,062	2,385
14	(German Basketball Federation) ratiopharm Ulm	23,754	3,762	1,593	2,375
15	(Italian Basketball Federation) Dolomiti Energia Trento	19,614	3,501	1,658	2,179
16	(Basketball Federation of Ukraine) Prometey	19,185	3,343	1,081	1,919
17	(Basketball Federation of Slovenia) Cedevita Olimpija	16,244	2,799	1,091	1,805
18	(Polish Basketball Federation) Śląsk Wrocław	14,513	2,389	1,013	1,613
19	(German Basketball Federation) Veolia Towers Hamburg	12,129	2,694	708	1,348
20	(Israeli Basketball Association) Hapoel Shlomo Tel Aviv	4,182	3,362	0	2,091
	League total	560,178	15,644	85	3,028

Source: EuroCup

1. Due to the Russian invasion of Ukraine, Prometey played all their home games in Arena Riga in Riga, Latvia.
2. Beşiktaş Emlakjet game against Hapoel Shlomo Tel Aviv was relocated at Arena Stozice at Ljubljana, Slovenia due to security concerns.
3. Due to the Gaza war, Hapoel Shlomo Tel Aviv played all their home games at Aleksandar Nikolić Hall in Belgrade, Serbia behind closed doors.
4. Hapoel Shlomo Tel Aviv games are not included in league total.

== See also ==
- 2023–24 EuroLeague
- 2023–24 Basketball Champions League
- 2023–24 FIBA Europe Cup
- 2023–24 EuroLeague Women
- 2023–24 EuroCup Women
- 2023–24 EuroCup Women Qualification Round
